= Battle of Nasielsk =

Coordinates: 52°36′00″N 20°48′00″E

- Part of Polish–Bolshevik War
Date	14–16 August 1920
Location	near Warsaw, Poland
Result	Polish victory

Belligerents
Poland	Russian SFSR

Commanders and leaders
Józef Pilsudski; Władysław Sikorski	Tukhachevsky; August Kork; Vladimir Lazarevich; Aleksandr Shuvayev

The Battle of Nasielsk was fought on August 14 and August 15 of 1920 between Polish and Soviet forces. The Polish launched a counterattack against Soviet forces who were besieging Warsaw.

Polish General Władysław Sikorski, commanding the Fifth Army, consisting of three infantry and two cavalry divisions, was given the task of containing the Soviet right wing formed by the Soviet 4th, 15th, and 3rd Armies, consisting of twelve infantry and two cavalry divisions. The Poles took the offensive on the morning of 14 Aug., crossing the Wkra and Vistula Rivers. Gen. Karnicki raided Ciechanów and captured the Soviet IV Army's plans and cyphers. On 16 Aug., Sikorski entered Nasielsk, using tanks, armoured cars, and two armoured trains. On 18 Aug. he neared his objectives on the Orzyc and Narew Rivers.

Sikorski's attacks allowed Pilsudski to launch his strike force on 16 Aug. Sikorski "had ensured the clearance of the Vistula bridgehead and the success of the counter-offensive from the Wieprz. The Soviets withdrew their 15th and 3rd armies, and abandoned the 4th Army to its fate.
