= Battle of the Niemen River =

Battle of the Polish–Soviet War

Battle of the Niemen
- Part of the Polish–Soviet War
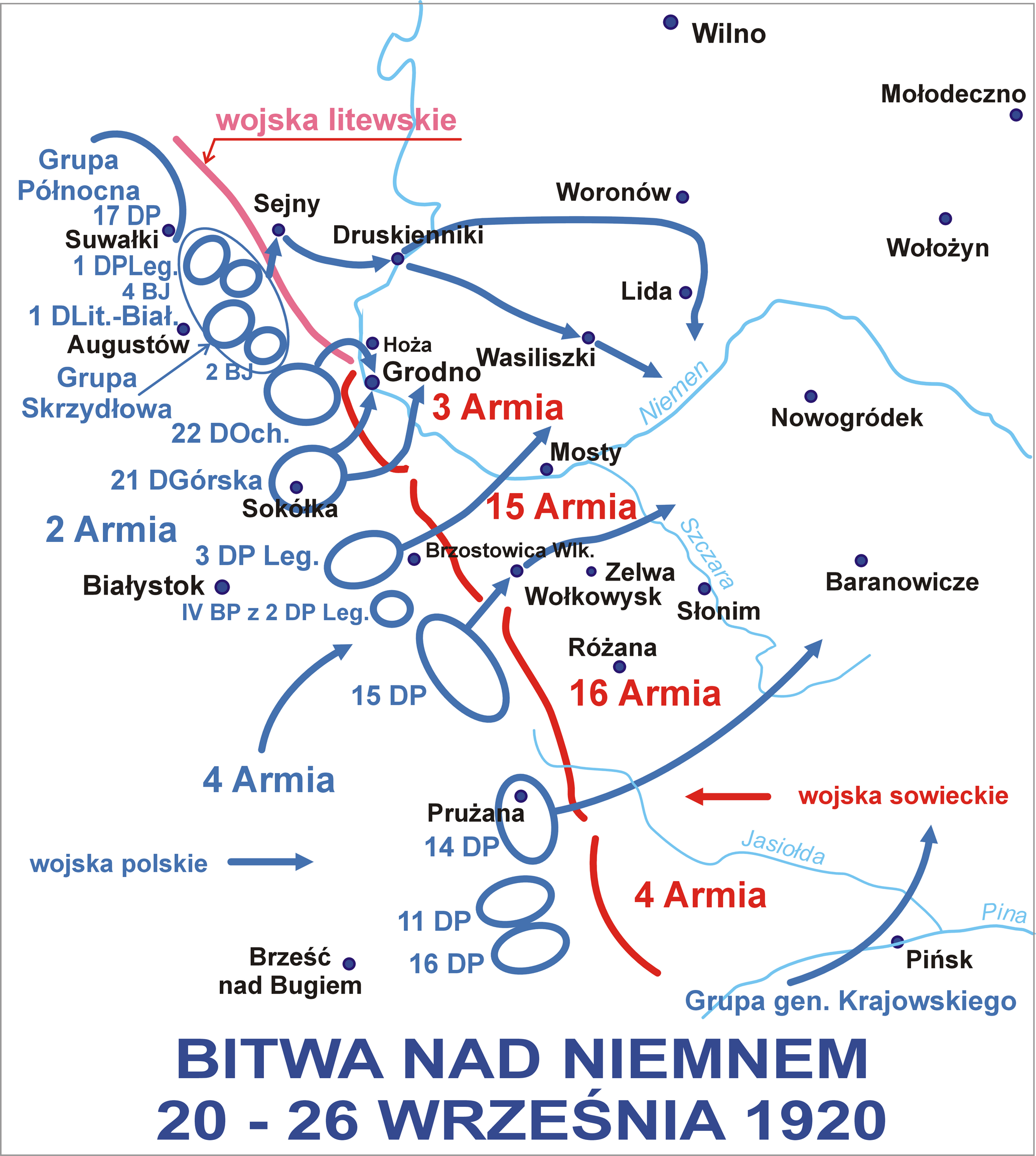
- Polish and Bolshevik forces at the start of the battle.
Date	15–25 September 1920
Location	near Hrodna, along the Neman River 53°30′N 24°00′E
Result	Polish victory

Belligerents
Russian SFSR	Poland

Commanders and leaders
Mikhail Tukhachevsky	Józef Piłsudski

Strength
c. 100,000	96,300

Casualties and losses
c. 40,000	7,000
- Location within Belarus Battle of the Niemen River (Europe)

The Battle of the Niemen River was the second-largest battle of the Polish–Soviet War. It took place near the middle Neman River between the cities of Suwałki, Grodno, and Białystok. After suffering almost complete defeat in the Battle of Warsaw (August 1920), Mikhail Tukhachevsky's Red Army forces tried to establish a defensive line, against Józef Piłsudski's counter-attacking Polish Army, running northward from the Polish-Lithuanian border to Polesie, and centering on Grodno. Between 15 September and 25 September 1920, the Poles outflanked the Soviets, once again defeating them. After the mid-October Battle of the Szczara River, the Polish Army had reached the Tarnopol-Dubno-Minsk-Drissa line.

Although this part of the conflict is usually referred to as a battle both in Polish and Russian historiography, some historians argue that it was more of a military operation with a series of battles fought often several hundred kilometres apart.

== Prelude ==
Following the Battle of Warsaw in mid-August, the armies in the centre of the Russian front fell into chaos. Mikhail Tukhachevsky ordered a general retreat toward the Bug River, but by then he had lost contact with most of his forces near Warsaw, and all the Bolshevik plans had been thrown into disarray by communication failures. Russian armies retreated in a disorganised fashion, with entire divisions panicking and disintegrating. The Red Army's defeat was so great and unexpected that, at the instigation of Piłsudski's detractors, the Battle of Warsaw is often referred to in Poland as the "Miracle at the Vistula". Previously unknown documents from Polish Central Military Archive found in 2004 proved that the successful breaking of Red Army radio communications ciphers by Polish cryptographers played a great role in the victory.

Although successful, the Polish counter-attack in the battle of Warsaw created an awkward situation for Polish commander in chief Józef Piłsudski. Most of his forces were facing north while Russian heartland was located east of the front rather than north. Because of that, the Polish Army needed some time to reorganise and regroup before a new offensive could be mounted. The Russian commanding officer Mikhail Tukhachevsky took this as an opportunity to establish a new defensive line along the Niemen River, initially safe from Polish forces. The new Soviet line ran from the Russian-Lithuanian demarcation line in the north, to the dense forests and swamps of Polesie, with the city of Grodno (modern Hrodna, Belarus) as a pivot.

== Opposing forces ==
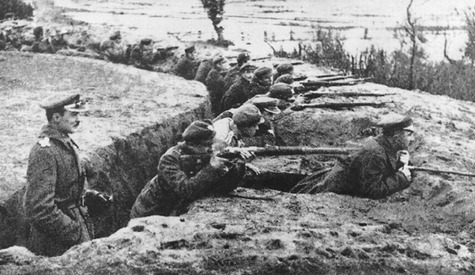
Photo of the battle. Polish soldiers in trenches.

Both the Polish Army and the opposing Red Army suffered heavy casualties in the course of war, and especially during the Russian summer offensive of 1920. Moreover, both opposing armies were still in the phase of organisation. By August, the Poles mobilised almost 1 million men, which allowed them to reinforce most front-line units to approximately 50-60% of their nominal strength. Out of that number, almost 350,000 were in active service on the eastern front, while the rest served in other units or were still training. The Polish brigades and divisions were usually ill-equipped, but were commanded by experienced officers, veterans of the Great War and the subsequent Polish–Ukrainian War. Moreover, with fresh forces arriving to the front almost every week the reserves of the Polish C-i-C were sufficient for waging an offensive war.

The Red Army suffered heavy casualties in the Battle of Warsaw in August and lacked organisation. Although the reserves of fresh, untrained recruits were almost unlimited, the Russian units lacked experienced officers. Also, in the course of the war the Soviet forces lost large parts of their artillery, which was usually used on the battlefield as a last stand against the assaulting enemy. This tactic allowed the Poles to outgun their enemies. Also, the Russian air forces were almost non-existent while the Polish Army could use its few aeroplanes to successfully disrupt enemy moves and conduct intelligence operations.

The Red Army was organised in several fronts. The Western Front facing the Poles had more than 700,000 soldiers in August. However, a large part of its forces were either taken prisoner of war by the Poles, interned in East Prussia or routed. After the arrival of 68,000 reinforcements in August and additional 20,500 in September, the forces of Tukhachevsky reached approximately 20 to 40% of their nominal strength. However, both the morale and the reinforcement abilities of the Russian troops were seriously degraded.

=== Polish Army ===
The order of battle of the Polish Army as after the reorganisation of 11 September. The position of units as of 15 September 1920. The armies and divisions are listed north to south.

Polish Army	Army	Operational Group	Unit	Remarks
Józef Piłsudski HQ in Białystok	2nd Army; Edward Rydz	Shielding group Left flank, facing Lithuania	Siberian Brigade; Rumsza	
Józef Piłsudski HQ in Białystok	2nd Army; Edward Rydz	Shielding group Left flank, facing Lithuania	17th Greater Polish Division; Osiński	
Józef Piłsudski HQ in Białystok	2nd Army; Edward Rydz	Wing Group / Assault Group west of Grodno and in Suwałki area	1st Polish Legions Infantry Division; Dąb-Biernacki	
Józef Piłsudski HQ in Białystok	2nd Army; Edward Rydz	Wing Group / Assault Group west of Grodno and in Suwałki area	1st Lithuanian-Belarusian Division; Rządkowski	
Józef Piłsudski HQ in Białystok	2nd Army; Edward Rydz	Wing Group / Assault Group west of Grodno and in Suwałki area	II Cavalry Brigade	
Józef Piłsudski HQ in Białystok	2nd Army; Edward Rydz	Wing Group / Assault Group west of Grodno and in Suwałki area	IV Cavalry Brigade; Nieniewski	
Józef Piłsudski HQ in Białystok	2nd Army; Edward Rydz	Front Group west of Grodno, ordered to hold out the enemy	22nd Volunteer Infantry Division; Koc	
Józef Piłsudski HQ in Białystok	2nd Army; Edward Rydz	Front Group west of Grodno, ordered to hold out the enemy	21st Mountain Infantry Division; Galica	
Józef Piłsudski HQ in Białystok	2nd Army; Edward Rydz	Right Flank; Niemen river crossing in Mosty Zaniemeńskie	3rd Polish Legions Infantry Division; Berbecki	
Józef Piłsudski HQ in Białystok	4th Army; Leonard Skierski	Main Forces	15th Greater Polish Division; Jung	Upper Rosia river
Józef Piłsudski HQ in Białystok	4th Army; Leonard Skierski	Main Forces	14th Greater Polish Division; Konarzewski	to the NE of Prużana
Józef Piłsudski HQ in Białystok	4th Army; Leonard Skierski	Main Forces	11th Infantry Division; Małachowski	to the NE of Kobryń
Józef Piłsudski HQ in Białystok	4th Army; Leonard Skierski	Main Forces	16th Pomeranian Division; Ładoś	Kobryń-Pińsk railroad and highway
Józef Piłsudski HQ in Białystok	4th Army; Leonard Skierski	Garrison of Brześć Fortress	"Brześć" Fortified Area ?	ca. 1200 men
Józef Piłsudski HQ in Białystok	3rd Army; Władysław Sikorski	Left wing Wołyń area	Bułak-Bałachowicz's Group; Bułak-Bałachowicz	ca. 1500 men, formed of deserters from the Red Army and other Russian and Belarusian volunteers
Józef Piłsudski HQ in Białystok	3rd Army; Władysław Sikorski	Left wing Wołyń area	18th Infantry Division; Krajowski	
Józef Piłsudski HQ in Białystok	3rd Army; Władysław Sikorski	Main forces between Wołyń and Lwów	2nd Polish Legions Division; Żymierski	
Józef Piłsudski HQ in Białystok	3rd Army; Władysław Sikorski	Main forces between Wołyń and Lwów	7th Infantry Division; Schubert	
Józef Piłsudski HQ in Białystok	3rd Army; Władysław Sikorski	Main forces between Wołyń and Lwów	9th Infantry Division; Narbut-Łuczyński	
Józef Piłsudski HQ in Białystok	3rd Army; Władysław Sikorski	Main forces between Wołyń and Lwów	10th Infantry Division; Żeligowski	
Józef Piłsudski HQ in Białystok	3rd Army; Władysław Sikorski	Main forces between Wołyń and Lwów	Dreszer's Cavalry group Dreszer	3rd and 9th cavalry brigades, later renamed to 2nd Cavalry Division
Józef Piłsudski HQ in Białystok	3rd Army; Władysław Sikorski	Haller's Operational Group; Haller von Hallenburg	1st Cavalry Division; Rómmel	temporarily attached
Józef Piłsudski HQ in Białystok	3rd Army; Władysław Sikorski	Haller's Operational Group; Haller von Hallenburg	13th Infantry Division; Haller de Hallenburg	temporarily attached
Józef Piłsudski HQ in Białystok	3rd Army; Władysław Sikorski	Allied troops	Don Cossacks' Brigade col. Salnikov	Only 251 soldiers and officers
Józef Piłsudski HQ in Białystok	3rd Army; Władysław Sikorski	Allied troops	Kuban Cossacks' Brigade mjr. Yakovlev	Only 614 soldiers and officers
Józef Piłsudski HQ in Białystok	3rd Army; Władysław Sikorski	Garrison of Zamość	6th Ukrainian Division; Bezruchko	token forces left in the city after the Battle of Komarów
Józef Piłsudski HQ in Białystok	6th Army; Wacław Iwaszkiewicz	Januszajtis' Group towards Płoskirów	12th Infantry Division; Żegota-Januszajtis	
Józef Piłsudski HQ in Białystok	6th Army; Wacław Iwaszkiewicz	Latinik's Group around Lwów	5th Infantry Division; Szymański?	
Józef Piłsudski HQ in Białystok	6th Army; Wacław Iwaszkiewicz	Latinik's Group around Lwów	8th Infantry Division; Burhardt-Bukacki	
Józef Piłsudski HQ in Białystok	6th Army; Wacław Iwaszkiewicz	Latinik's Group around Lwów	I Cavalry Brigade	Narajówka river, Złota Lipa - east of Lwów
Józef Piłsudski HQ in Białystok	6th Army; Wacław Iwaszkiewicz	Jędrzejowski's Group around Lwów	7th Infantry Division; K. Szubert?	
Józef Piłsudski HQ in Białystok	6th Army; Wacław Iwaszkiewicz	Jędrzejowski's Group around Lwów	13th Infantry Division; Pawlik	
Józef Piłsudski HQ in Białystok	6th Army; Wacław Iwaszkiewicz	Jędrzejowski's Group around Lwów	Organic cavalry	
Józef Piłsudski HQ in Białystok	Ukrainian Army; Mykhailo Omelianovych-Pavlenko		1st to 5th Infantry Divisions and 1st Cavalry	Only nominally, en cadre and had 8189 officers and 8202 soldiers (mostly cavalrymen). Reserve of the 6th Army south of Lwów.

== Plans of both sides ==
Russian headquarters seriously overestimated its own forces. Sergey Kamenev ordered Tukhachevsky to mount an all-out counter-offensive as soon as the reorganisation of Russian forces was complete. By 26 August, the Russians manned the Neman-Shchara-Svislach line with rump forces to escape the disaster at Warsaw. However, fresh reinforcements from mainland Russia were arriving on a daily basis and by mid-September Tukhachevski managed to recreate most divisions lost in mid-August. His forces quickly rose to over 73,000 soldiers and 220 pieces of artillery.

Following Kamenev's orders, Tukhachevsky planned an offensive of three armies: the 3rd (six divisions under Vladimir Lazarevich), 15th (four divisions under Avgust Ivanovich Kork), and 16th (four divisions under Nikolai Sollogub). The Russian forces were to sweep southwards, retaking the Brest Fortress and Białystok, with the final objective being the city of Lublin. There the Russians could expect reinforcements from other Russian units operating south of the Pinsk Marshes in Ukraine, as well as experienced troops that could be pulled back from other fronts of the Russian Civil War.

At the same time Józef Piłsudski's main objective was to reorganise his forces and break through the enemy lines along the Neman before Russian defences stiffened, thus disrupting any enemy counter-attack attempts. On 10 September, during a staff meeting with his generals, Piłsudski proposed a plan of a major operation near Neman and Shchara rivers. Two Polish armies (2nd under General Edward Rydz and 4th under General Leonard Skierski) were to tie down main Russian forces by a frontal attack aimed at Grodno and Wołkowysk (modern Vaŭkavysk, Belarus). Simultaneously, a strong force detached from the 2nd Army was to outflank the Russians from the north, through a strip of land between Sejny and Druskienniki (modern Druskininkai) controlled by Lithuanian forces and attack the Russian army from behind, in the vicinity of Lida. In the south, the 4th Army was to assault Wołkowysk and prepare to close the encirclement.

== Battle ==
The first action took place on 20 September, with the 21st (Alpine) Division attacking Grodno, supported by the Volunteer Division and the 3rd Legionary Division on either flank. Between 23 and 25 September, the battle was evenly balanced. However, the flanking attack by General Osinski's Suwalki Group, the 1st Legionary Division, and the 1st Lithuanian-Byelorussian Division from Sejny, took Druskienniki on 23 September and cut the Soviet 3rd Army's supply line at the Grodno-Wilno railway. The Polish cavalry reached Radun and then Lida. On 26 September, General Krajowski's cavalry took Pinsk, cutting the Soviet 4th Army's supply line. Tukhachevsky ordered a retreat.
