= Western Front (RSFSR) =

Red Army group during the Russian Civil War and the Polish-Soviet War

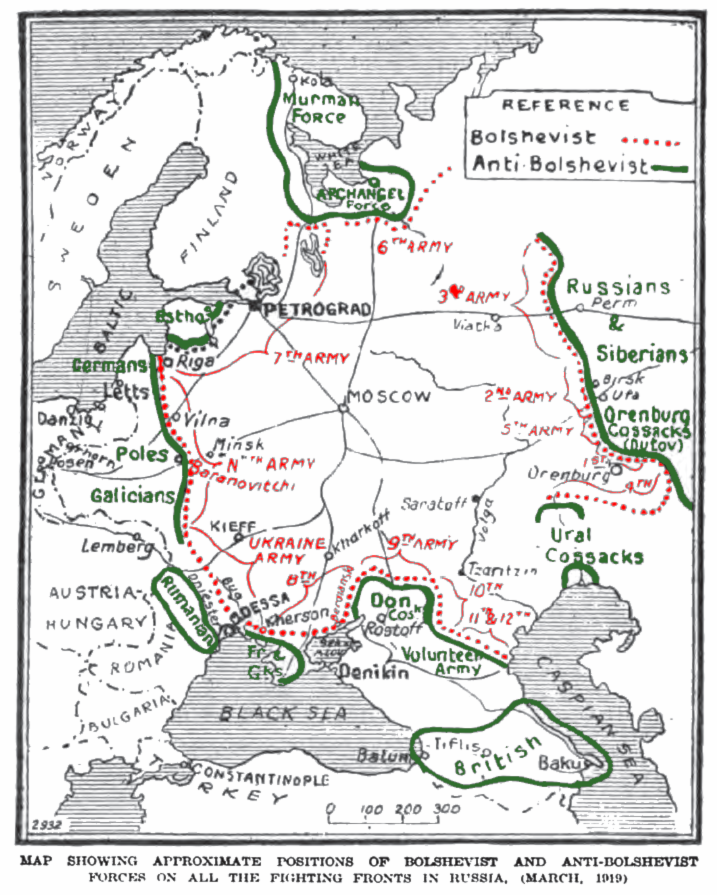
Russian Civil War—Military positions in March 1919

The Western Front (Russian: Западный фронт) was a front of the Red Army during the Russian Civil War and Polish–Soviet War, which existed between 12 February 1919 and 8 April 1924. The Western Front was first established on the basis of the administration of the disbanded Northern Front. The Front headquarters were located consequently in Staraya Russa, Molodechno, Daugavpils, Smolensk and Minsk.

== Operations ==
At the time of the formation of the Western Front, Soviet troops were fighting on a front some 2,000 km long, stretching from Murmansk (against the White Northern Army and the North Russia intervention), over the Karelian Isthmus (against Finland), and the Baltics to the Belorussian Front (against Estonian, Latvian, Lithuanian formations and Russian White Guards, supported by German and Polish troops).

By July 1919, the Soviet Armies of the Western Front had retreated from the Baltic area under the onslaught of the enemy. In Belarus, the Polish offensive was stopped in August on the Berezina River. In August 1919 the Front forces were on the line of the Gulf of Finland-Pskov-Polotsk-Berezina river.

In June–August and October–November 1919, the 7th and 15th Armies, supported by the ships of the Baltic Fleet, repelled two offensives of the White Northwestern Army under Nikolai Yudenich against Petrograd and defeated it, which allowed the concentration of the main efforts of the Red Army in the fight against the armies of Denikin and Kolchak.

In 1920, the Western Front became the main front of the Soviet Republic and it participated in repelling the offensive of the Polish Army during the Polish–Soviet War. The May operation (1920) of the Western Front, although it did not achieve its goals, created favorable conditions for a successful counteroffensive of the troops of the South-Western Front in Ukraine.

As a result of the July operation (1920) of the Western Front, Belarus and parts of Lithuania were occupied, and in August 1920 the troops of the Western Front approached Warsaw. However, the reassessment by the Soviet command of its forces and the underestimation of the enemy's forces, as well as bad coordination between the Western and South-Western Fronts, led to the defeat of the Soviet troops of the Western Front in the Battle of Warsaw (1920) and their withdrawal.

Despite the defeat of the Red Army, Poland didn't continue the war and a truce was signed on 12 October, which enabled the Red Army to concentrate its main forces against Wrangel's troops around the Crimean Peninsula.

The Western Front and its administration continued to exist after the end of hostilities, until it was transformed into the Western Military District on April 8, 1924.

== Composition ==
- 7th Army (19 February 1919 – 10 May 1921),
- 16th Army (a.k.a. Western Army and Belarusian-Lithuanian Army) (19 February 1919 – 7 May 1921),
- 15th Army (a.k.a. Soviet Latvian Army) (19 February 1919 – 4 October 1920),
- Estonian Army (19 February 1919 – 30 May 1919),
- 12th Army (16 June 1919 – 27 July 1919; 7 September 1919 – 17 October 1919; 14 August 1920 – 27 September 1920),
- 3rd Army (11 June 1920 – 31 December 1920),
- 4th Army (11 June 1920 – 18 October 1920),
- 1st Cavalry Army (14 August 1920 – 27 September 1920),
- Reserve Army (April 1920 – November 1920)
- Mozyr group (18 May 1920 – September 1920)
- Dnieper Flotilla (1919)

=== Composition of the Western Front in August 1920 ===
- 3rd Army (Komandarm Vladimir Lazarevich)
  - 5th Rifle Division (Karl Grunstein)
  - 6th RD (Aleksey Storozhenko)
  - 21st RD (Georgy Ovchinnikov)
  - 56th RD (K. N. Annenkov)
- 4th Army (Komandarm Yevgeniy Sergeyev, replaced by Aleksandr Shuvayev from 31 July 1920)
  - 12th RD (Andrey Reva)
  - 18th RD (I. F. Kuprianov)
  - 53rd RD (K. P. Shcherbakov)
  - 54th RD (V. N. Shubin)
  - 143rd Brigade (48th RD)
  - 164th Brigade (55th RD) (M. I. Rozen)
- 3rd Cavalry Corps (Komkor Gaia Gai)
  - 10th Cavalry Division (N. D. Tomin)
  - 15th Cavalry Division (V. I. Matuzenko)
- 15th Army (Komandarm August Kork)
  - 4th RD (V. I. Solodukhin)
  - 11th RD (M. K. Simonov)
  - 16th RD (S. P. Medvedovskiy)
  - 33rd RD (O. A. Stigga)
- 16th Army (Komandarm Nikolai Sollogub)
  - 2nd RD (R. V. Longva)
  - 8th RD (V. M. Smirnov)
  - 10th RD (A. E. Dauman)
  - 17th RD (K. P. Nevezhin)
  - 27th RD (Vitovt Putna)
- Mozyr Group (Komdiv Tikhon Khvesin)
  - 57th RD (N. Z. Mikita-Kolyada)
  - 139th Brigade (47th RD)

== Commanders ==
Commander :

- Dmitry Nikolayevich Nadyozhny (19.02.1919 - 22.07.1919)
- Vladimir Gittis (22.07.1919 - 29.04.1920)
- Mikhail Tukhachevsky (29.04.1920 - 04.03.1921)
- Ivan Zakharov (04.03.1921 - 20.09.1921)
- Alexander Yegorov (20.09.1921 - 24.01.1922)
- Mikhail Tukhachevsky (24.01.1922 - 26.03.1924)
- August Kork (26.03.1924 - 05.04.1924)
- Alexander Kuk (05.04.1924 - 08.04.1924)

Chief of Staff :

- Nokolai Domogyrov (19.02.1919 — 26.05.1919),
- Nikolai Petin (26.05.1919 — 17.10.1919),
- Alaksei Peremytov (17.10.1919 — 13.11.1919),
- Vladimir Lazarevich (13.11.1919 — 09.02.1920),
- Nikolai Schwartz (25.02.1920 - 30.09.1920)
- Nikolai Sollogub (01.10.1920 - 06.12.1920)
- Pavel Ermolin (06.12.1920 - 07.06.1921)
- Mikhail Batorsky (07.06.1921 - 23.11.1921)
- Sergei Mezheninov (23.11.1921 - 06.07.1923)
- Ivan Gludin (06.07.1923 - 30.09.1923)
- Alexander Kuk (30.09.1923 - 08.04.1924)

Members of the Revolutionary Military Council include :

- Boris Pozern
- Reingold Berzin
- Joseph Stalin
- Konstantin Yurenev
- Józef Unszlicht
- Arkady Rosengolts
- Ivar Smilga
- Felix Dzerzhinsky
- Romuald Muklevich

== Sources ==
- Zaloga, Steven J. (2020). Cowper, Marcus (ed.). Warsaw 1920: The War for the Eastern Borderlands. Osprey Publishing. ISBN 9781472837295.
