= Battle of Kobryń (1920) =

- Part of the Polish–Soviet War
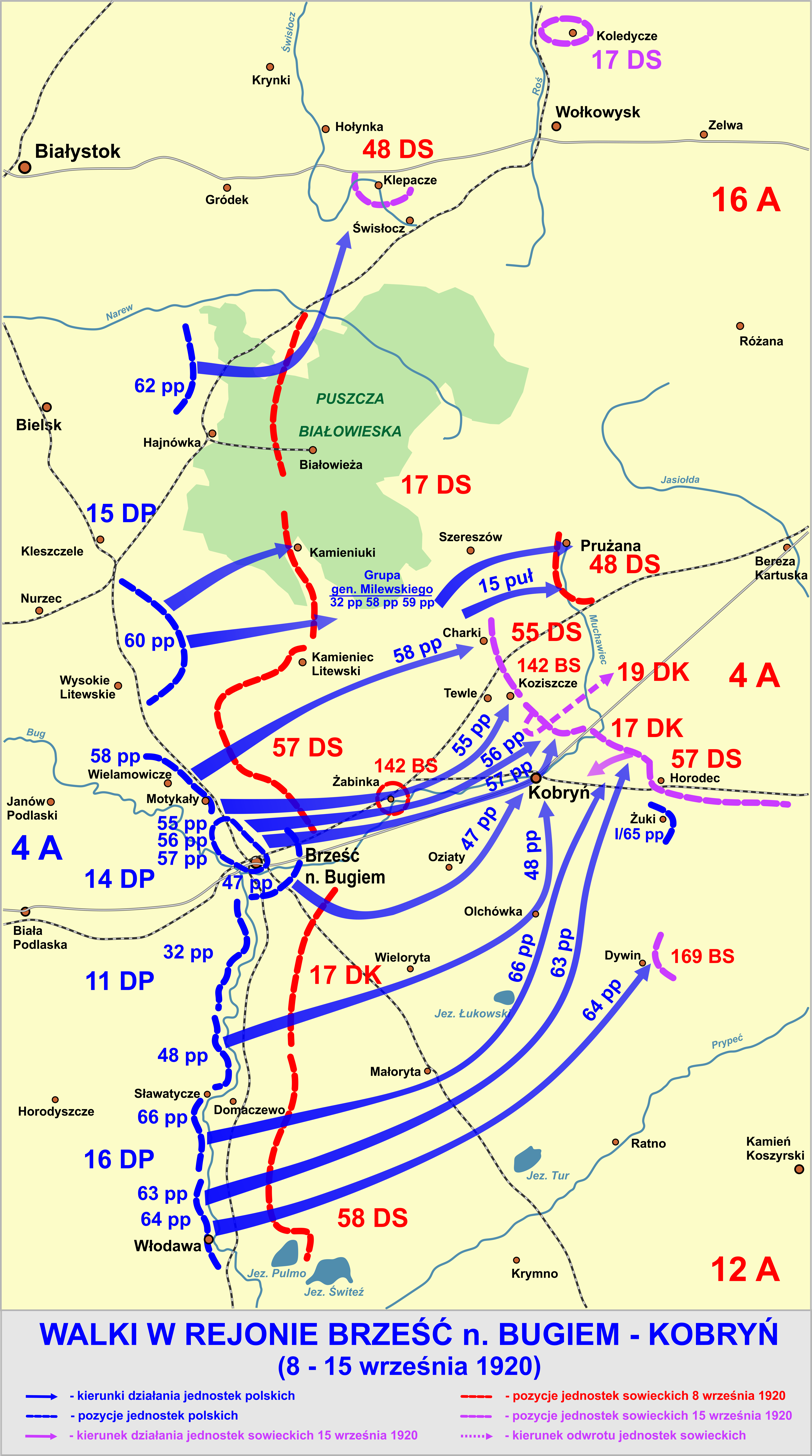
- map of Kobryn
Date	11–23 September 1920
Location	near Kobryn (present-day Belarus)
Result	Polish-Belarusian victory

Belligerents
Russian SFSR	Poland; Belarusian People's Republic

Commanders and leaders
Aleksandr Shuvayev	Leonard Skierski; Stanisław Bułak-Bałachowicz

The Battle of Kobryn took place on between 11 and 23 September 1920, during the Polish–Soviet War. Polish Fourth Army, commanded by General Leonard Skierski defeated Soviet forces in the area of Kobryn (present-day Belarus).

After the Battle of Warsaw, the Fourth Army was in early September 1920 transported eastwards, to guard the front along the rail line Białystok – Brześć nad Bugiem – Włodawa. The Army consisted of the following units: 15th Infantry Division, 14th Infantry Division, 11th Infantry Division, and 16th Infantry Division.

Facing them was newly created Soviet Fourth Army, consisting of two rifle divisions (48th and 57th), and 17th Cavalry Division. These units were supported by 19th and 55th Rifle Divisions, which had completed their concentration in the first half of September. After additional reinforcements brought from Russia, the Soviets had a numerical advantage along the frontline.

General Skierski, aware of the Soviet plans, decided to forestall their advance, and ordered the 14th I.D. to capture Zhabinka 8 on September. On the night of 11 September, the Polish 11th I.D. destroyed the Soviet forces near Malaryta, and after this victory, Skierski ordered an assault on Kobryn, which was defended by the Soviet 57th Rifle Division. The Poles entered the town on the morning of 12 September, but the Soviets concentrated three divisions (55th, 57th and 19th) and on the night of 15–16 September attacked a gap between the Polish 14th and 16th I.D. The enemy captured a bridge over the Mukhavets River, and then attacked the Polish 57th Infantry Regiment. Heavy fighting ensued, but despite Soviet superiority, the Poles kept their ground.

On 16 September regiments of Polish 16th I.D. were forced to retreat, but on the next day, after reinforcements had been brought, Polish soldiers recaptured the lost territory. In two days of fighting (16 and 17 September) the Poles lost 500 soldiers dead and wounded, and to draw the Soviets away from Kobryn General Skierski created the Operational Group of General Michal Milewski to carry out a raid on Pruzhany. The town was captured on the night of 18–19 September but fighting there continued until 22 September.

Fighting over Kobryn and Pruzana tied down the whole Soviet Fourth Army, which removed the threat of the capture of Brest Fortress, and allowed the Polish Army headquarters to prepare an operational plan for the Battle of the Niemen River. Furthermore, the Soviet 12th Army, fighting in Volhynia, had to retreat, as its wing came under Polish pressure.

The battle is commemorated on the Tomb of the Unknown Soldier, Warsaw, with the inscription "KOBRYN 14 – 15 IX 1920".

== Sources ==
- Odziemkowski, J. (2004). Leksykon wojny polsko–rosyjskiej 1919–1920. Warsaw: RYTM.
