= 16th Army (RSFSR) =

- Flag of the Red Army
- Active: November 1918–May 1921
- Country: Russian Soviet Federative Socialist Republic
- Branch: Red Army
- Part of: Western Front
- Engagements: Russian Civil War; Polish-Soviet War

Commanders
- Notable commanders: Nikolai Sollogub

The 16th Army (Russian: 16-я армия, romanized: 16-ya armiya) was a field army of the Red Army during the Russian Civil War era. It was originally formed as the Western Army (Russian: Западная Армия, romanized: Zapadnaya Armiya) on November 15, 1918, by the Russian SFSR for the purpose of recovering territories lost by the Russian Empire during the First World War and establishing Soviet republics in those territories. The Western Army engaged various local forces from the Baltic States, Belarus, Poland and Ukraine, and its actions contributed to starting the Polish–Soviet War of 1919–1920. The army fought in the Polish–Soviet War under the command of Nikolai Sollogub and advanced westwards into Poland in July 1920 before being thrown back during the Battle of Warsaw in August. The army retreated east into Belarus and was disbanded in May 1921.

== History ==
=== Formation ===
After the Treaty of Brest-Litovsk, the newly established Russo-German border was controlled on the Russian side, by the so-called Western Section of Curtain Troops (Западный участок отрядов завесы), or simply the Western Curtain. The curtain was a sparse and heterogeneous set of detachments. Its commander was Vladimir Egoryev. (His official rank was "military leader" (военный руководитель), since he was a former Tsarist general) The Western Curtain covered over 800 kilometres along the line Nevel–Polotsk–Senno–Orsha–Mogilev–Zhlobin–Gomel–Novy Oskol. Eventually the Western Curtain was arranged into seven detachments with over 20,000 troops. This number was actually very small in relation to the area it covered, and insufficient in case of any larger battle. Moreover, part of its manpower was moved to other bottlenecks of the Russian Civil War.

Eventually, further recruiting by the Red Army allowed a reorganization of the detachments of the Curtain into regular divisions, and the Western Curtain was further reorganized into the Western Defense Region (Западный район обороны). It was created by the Revolutionary Military Council order #3/2 on September 11, 1918, headquartered at Kaluga. The Region extended from Petrograd to the Western edge of the Southern Front, and was commanded by Andrei Snesarev.

After the Treaty of Brest-Litovsk was annulled by the Soviets on November 13, 1918 the Western Defense Region was transformed into the Western Army (November 15, 1918), garrisoned in Smolensk. It was composed of the:

- Pskov Rifle Division (after the Soviet invasion of Lithuania, renamed to the Lithuanian Rifle Division),
- 17th Vitebsk Rifle Division,
- Western Rifle Division,
- units of the 2nd Area of Front Defense.

By the end of 1918, the strength of the Western (16th) Army was around 19,000 men, but had little artillery or cavalry (8 guns and 261 horses total). Over the next few months the strength of the Army grew to 46,000 men due to conscription and the mobilization of Communist Party members. It was considered by the Soviet High Command to be one of the least important armies in that period.

=== Westward advance ===
Immediately after its formation, on November 17, 1918, the Western Army started aggresively moving, following the retreat of the German forces, in the direction of Belarus and Ukraine. The purpose of the Soviet westward offensive of 1918–1919 was to take control over the territory abandoned by the German Army retreating from the Ober-Ost theater of operations. Later the Soviet Western Army engaged various self-defence and militia groups from Belarus, Lithuania, Poland and Ukraine. Among scores of battles, the Battle of Bereza Kartuska on February 14, 1919 sparked the Polish–Soviet War.

The army became part of the Western Front on February 19, and was renamed the Lithuanian-Belorussian Army on March 13. With this redesignation, the army officially became the army of the Lithuanian-Belorussian Soviet Socialist Republic, a Soviet puppet state covering the territory of Lithuania and Belorussia.

According to Polish intelligence, the Western Army, then in Lithuania and Belarus, had the following forces:

Strength of the Western Army in Feb. 1919 (according to Polish intelligence)
Rifle Division	Soldiers	Cavalry	Machine guns	Field guns	Heavy guns	Aircraft	Armored trains	Armored cars
Pskov	2,470	65	78	9	_	8	_	_
17th	7,045	165	157	20	4	_	3	4
Western	5,067	_	15	_	_	_	_	_
8th (joined in Dec.)	4,300	_	_	_	_	_	_	_
Total	~19,000	230	250	29	4	8	3	4

On June 9, it became the 16th Army after it was pushed out of Lithuania after retreating from Panevėžys in the Lithuanian War of Independence. Around the same time, the army headquarters was moved forward to Mogilev. The army continued to retreat until August, ceding Molodechno and Minsk to Polish troops, and in August took up defensive positions on the line of the Berezina River. From August 14, it was commanded by Nikolai Sollogub. In September, the army headquarters was relocated back to Smolensk, but moved to Novozybkov from March and May 1920. Between March and April 1920, the army fought to capture Mozyr. In May, the headquarters moved back to Mogilev.

=== Polish-Soviet War ===
==== May Offensive ====
From May 14 to June 8, 1920, the army fought in the Western Front counterattack against the Polish Kiev offensive, the May Offensive. In the counterattack, planned by front commander Mikhail Tukhachevsky, the 16th Army was to frontally attack the Polish 4th Army at Borisov and Igumen and keep it from moving to reinforce threatened Polish units, while the 15th Army, the main force, would advance southwest towards Molodechno, then wheel around and push the 1st Polish Army into the rear of the 4th, driving them into the Pripet marshes and destroying them there. The attack began on May 14, but failed when the Soviet advance was unable to build momentum and the 15th Army was counterattacked and forced into a disorderly retreat at the beginning of June. The 16th Army crossed the Berezina and created a bridgehead, but was itself counterattacked and forced to retreat back across the Berezina.

==== July Offensive and Battle of Warsaw ====
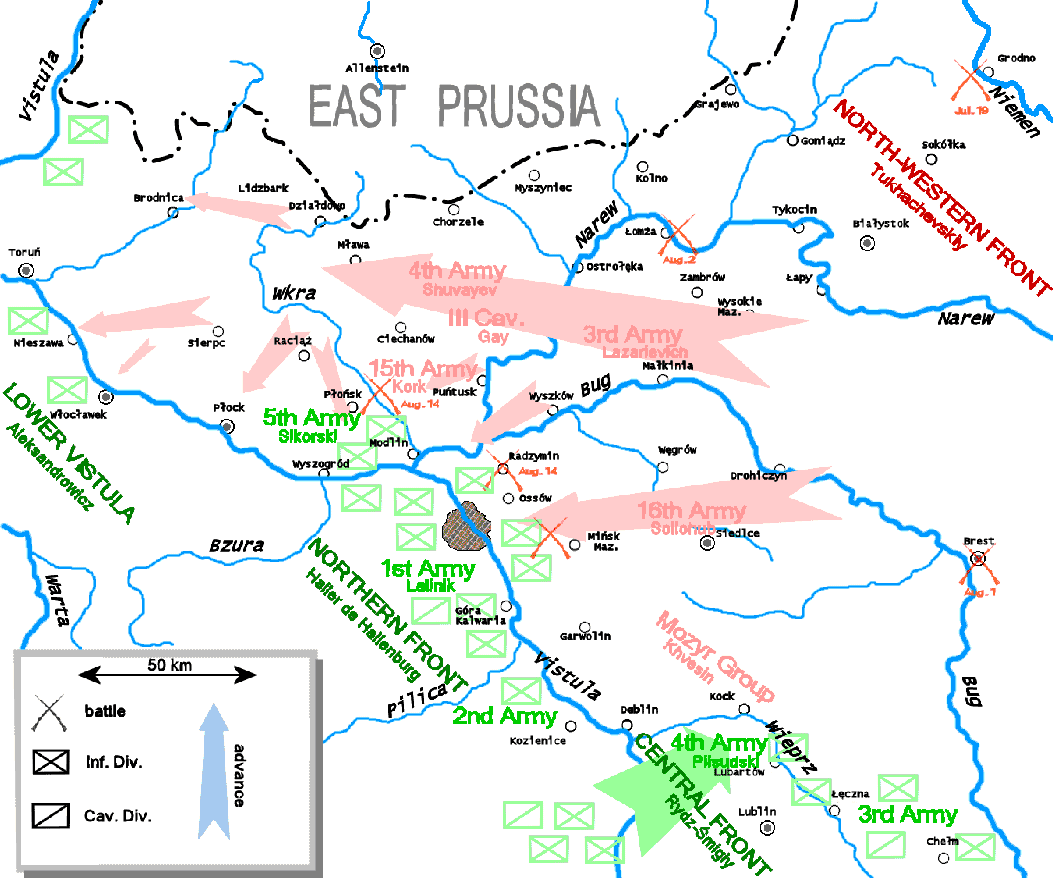
The Battle of Warsaw before the Polish counterattack, 16th Army positions are east of the city

Between July 4 and 23, the army fought in the July Offensive, the renewed Soviet offensive in the war. During the offensive, the army rapidly advanced through Belarus, capturing Igumen, Bobruisk, Minsk, Baranovichi, Slonim, and Vawkavysk. On July 25, the Soviet attack on Warsaw began, culminating in the Battle of Warsaw. The 16th Army continued to advance westward, and on the night of August 1, the army attacked Polish general Wladyslaw Sikorski's Polesie Group at Brest-Litovsk after crossing the Western Bug, and captured the town, breaching the fourth and final Polish defensive line in front of Warsaw. The army was unable to exploit its success by quickly advancing on Warsaw, however, because a counterattack by Sikorski in the first week of August threw it back across the Western Bug.

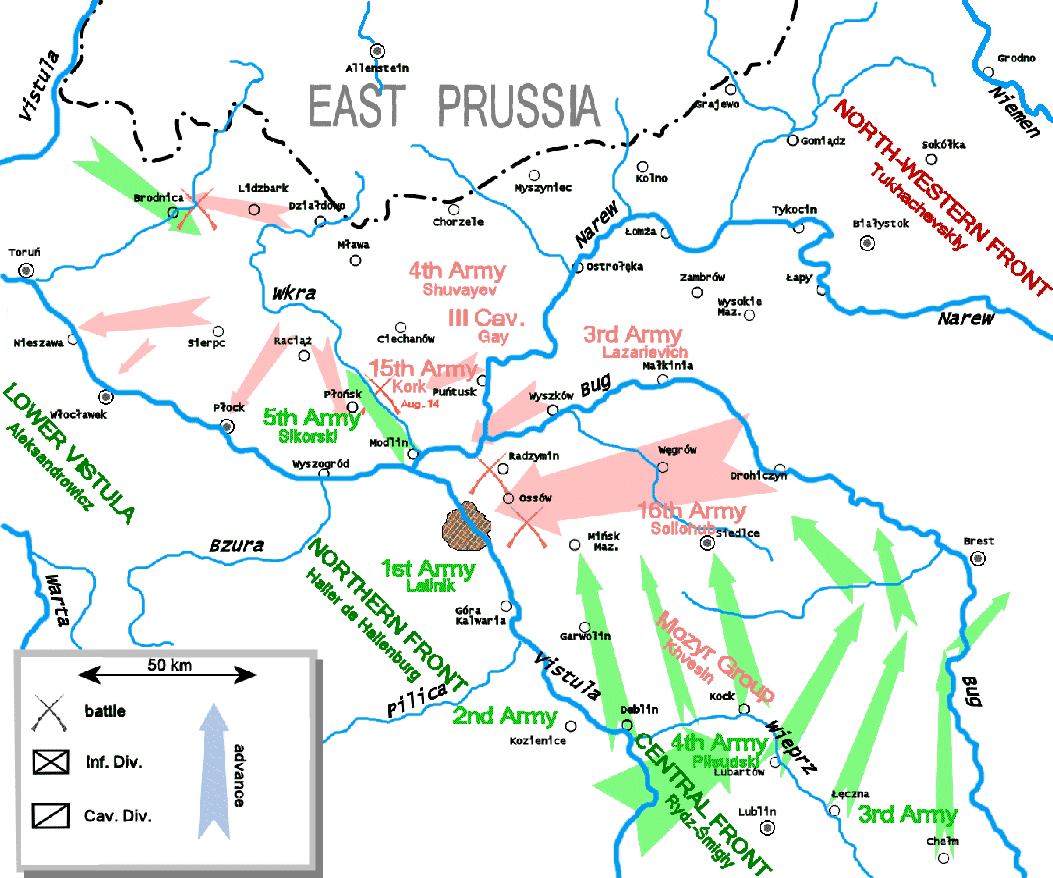
The Polish counterattack during the Battle of Warsaw

On August 8, Tukhachevsky issued his order for the capture of Warsaw, in which the 16th Army was to attack the city from the east, covered on its flank by the Mozyr Group of Forces. During the Battle of Radzymin between August 13 and 16, the army's 27th Omsk Rifle Division, commanded by Vitovt Putna, fought to capture Radzymin, which changed hands more than five times during the fighting. At the same time, Polish leader Józef Piłsudski's Assault Group began the counteroffensive. They quickly broke through the understrength Mozyr Group on 16th Army's flank, and on 18 August the army came under attack from both the three divisions of the Assault Group's 4th Army on its flank and the 10th and 15th Divisions advancing from Warsaw on its front. Under pressure, the three southernmost divisions of the 16th Army began a precipitate retreat to the east, but then were attacked in turn by troops from the Assault Group. As a result of these actions, the 8th and 10th Rifle Divisions were destroyed, while the 2nd Rifle Division suffered heavy losses. The 17th Rifle Division lost communication with the rest of the army in the chaos, leaving the Putna's 27th as the only intact unit in the army.

Out of touch with the situation at the front due to Polish radio jamming, Tukhachevsky ordered Sollogub to create a defensive line between Radzymin and Brest-Litovsk with his southern divisions to prevent Polish troops from attacking the Soviet rear. For this purpose, the army's commander was given permission to draw on the 60,000 replacements near Grodno. Sollogub issued the orders on August 19, when army headquarters had lost contact with all of its units, so they were not received. Early on the next day, he was almost captured by Feliks Jaworski's Polish cavalry brigade at his headquarters in Ostrożany. By this time, most of the army had fled across the Bug towards Białystok, with only the 27th Division holding a couple of crossings to allow stragglers to pass through.

By August 21, the army's remnants were hurriedly retreating eastwards in small groups, mostly avoiding roads and towns, with the 27th Division, down to 25% strength, guarding the rear and covering the retreat of both the 16th Army and the Mozyr Group. On August 22, Białystok was captured by the Polish 1st Legions Infantry Division, cutting off stragglers from the army and the Mozyr Group. The 27th Division launched a counterattack and briefly opened the road, but Putna left the area after a Polish counterattack retook the gains, leaving the stragglers to capture. Three days later, the division crossed the Niemen, moving towards Vawkavysk, away from the Polish forces. After withdrawing east of the Niemen back into Belarus, Tukhachevsky began preparations for renewing the offensive. As part of the resulting reorganization of the Red Army units of the front, the two best units of the 16th Army, the 2nd and 27th Divisions, were transferred to the 15th Army. In exchange, the army received the 48th and 56th Rifle Divisions, bringing it back up to its strength before the Battle of Warsaw, and its headquarters was located at Slonim.

==== Battle of the Niemen River and operations in Belarus ====
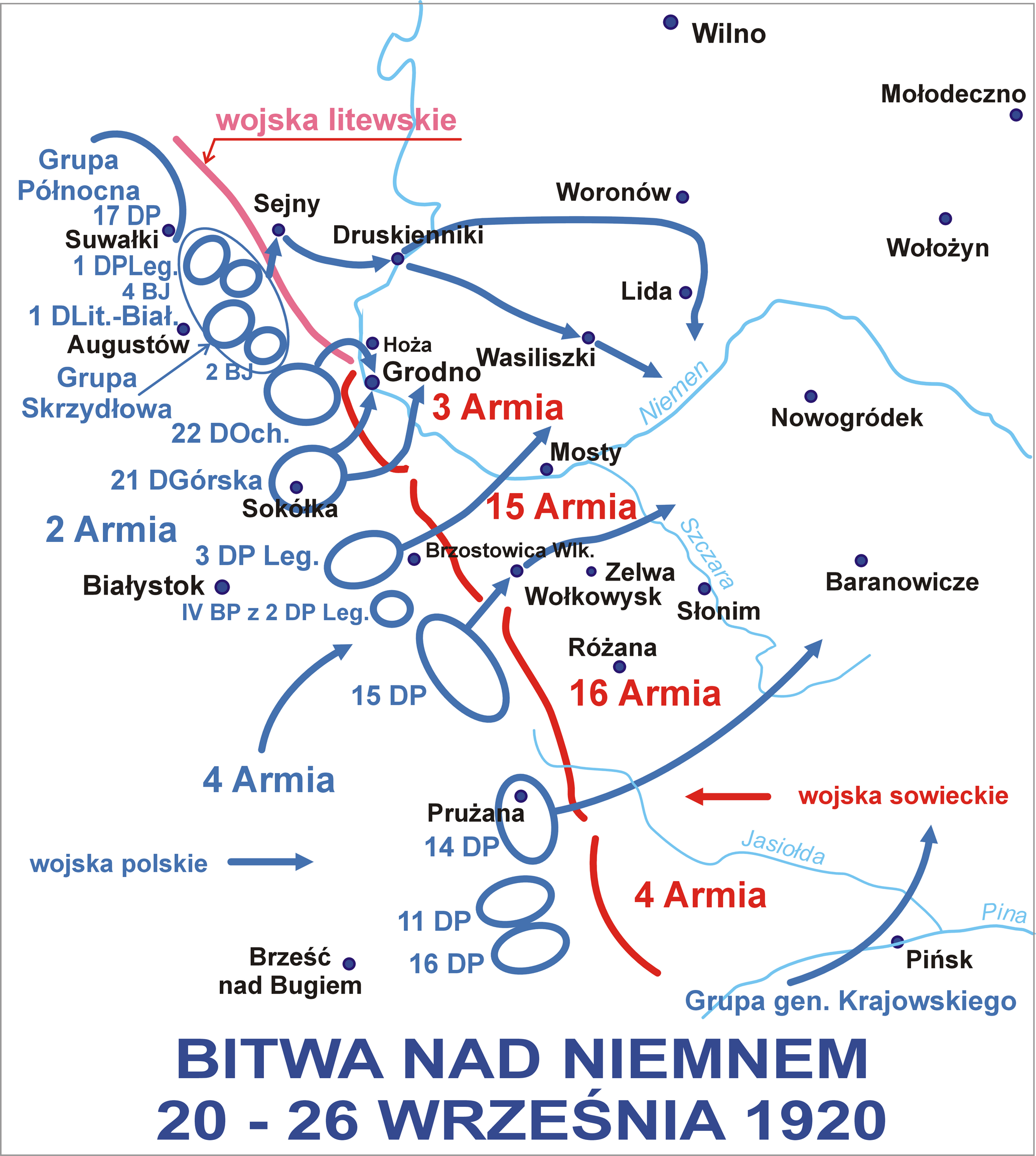
Positions at the beginning of the Battle of the Niemen River

However, Pilsudski launched his attack, known as the Battle of the Niemen River, on September 21. Although the Soviet line initially held, Polish forces moved through Lithuania, then swept south into the rear of the Soviet northern flank, which began a disorganized retreat. In the center, the 15th and 16th Armies retreated in an orderly fashion thanks to the actions of the 27th Division, the southernmost of the 15th Army units. By October 1, the units of the two armies were holding positions in a line of old Russian World War I trenches, opposite the former Polish positions from before the July Offensive. The defense line was quickly broken through by the Polish advance, and by the time the Polish troops captured Minsk and reached the Berezina on October 15, the 16th Army had been reduced to a skeleton of its original size. The war ended on the next day when the cease-fire between Poland and the RSFSR took effect. On October 17, the army was reinforced with troops from the disbanded 4th Army. From October, it was headquartered at Mogilev. Between November and December, the 16th Army fought against Stanisław Bułak-Bałachowicz's troops. On December 7, the army received the troops of the disbanded 3rd Army. In March, the Gomel Fortified Region became part of the 16th Army. The army was disbanded on May 7, 1921, and its troops distributed to other Western Front units.

== Commanders ==
The army was commanded by the following officers:

- Andrei Snesarev (November 15, 1918–May 31, 1919)
- Filipp Mironov (acting, May 31–14, 1919)
- Alexander Novikov (June 14–July 22, 1919)
- Vasily Glagolev (July 22–August 14, 1919)
- Nikolai Sollogub (August 14, 1919–September 21, 1920)
- Alexander Kuk (September 26, 1920–April 24, 1921)
- Yevgeny Shilovskiy (April 24–May 7, 1921)

== See also ==
- Western Rifle Division
- Nikolai Sollogub
