= Aleksandr Shuvayev =

Soviet military commander

Aleksandr Dmitriyevich Shuvayev (Russian: Александр Дмитриевич Шуваев; 8 December 1886, Novocherkassk - December 1943) was a Soviet military commander, who commanded the 4th Red Army in the Battle of Warsaw (1920), during the Polish-Soviet War and fought in the Russian Civil War.

== Biography ==
He was the son of Dmitry Shuvayev, Minister of War of the Russian Empire in 1916. Aleksandr became an officer in the Tsarist Russian Army. He served in several staff functions during World War I, which he ended as a Lieutenant Colonel. After the October Revolution, on 5 December 1918, he was drafted into the Red Army and was appointed Chief of Staff of the Petrograd division. Later he was Chief of Staff of the Northern group of the Western Front.

During the Polish-Soviet War, he was the Chief of Staff of the 4th Army in the period 18 June - 31 July 1920. When the Commander Evgeni Sergeyev was injured, Shuvayev became the acting Commander of the 4th Army from 31 July to 17 October 1920. His Army took Łomża and Ostrołęka, and by August 16, 1920, the Polish Army had been thrown back behind the Wkra river. But in the Battle of Warsaw (1920), his army was struck by a powerful Polish counteroffensive. The 4th Army suffered enormous losses, most of the survivors crossed the border into Eastern Prussia where they were interned.

Shuvayev remained in command of the reconstituted 4th Army, which was replenished with fresh divisions, but was again defeated after heavy fighting in Belarus, including the Battle of Kobryń (1920). His army retreated to the Slutsk area, where it was disbanded on 18 October 1920 after the truce with Poland.

From 1 to 18 November 1920, he was again Chief of Staff of the 4th Army, now under command of Vladimir Lazarevich. Later he became second assistant Chief of Staff of the Armed forces of Ukraine and the Crimea (February 191 - June 1922), Chief of Staff of the Army of the Far Eastern Republic (4 July - 21 August 1922) and Chief of Staff of the Turkestan Front (October 1923 - April 1924).

On 29 September 1937 he was arrested for so-called "anti-Soviet agitation", tried and sentenced to 8 years of imprisonment. He was held prisoner in a Gulag in the Komi Autonomous Soviet Socialist Republic. He was released from the Gulag on 21 October 1943 due to fatal illness, and died two months later. He was rehabilitated on 20 October 1956.

== Sources ==
- This is a translation of an article in the Polish Wikipedia, Aleksandr Szuwajew.
