= Aardla =

Village in Estonia

- Village
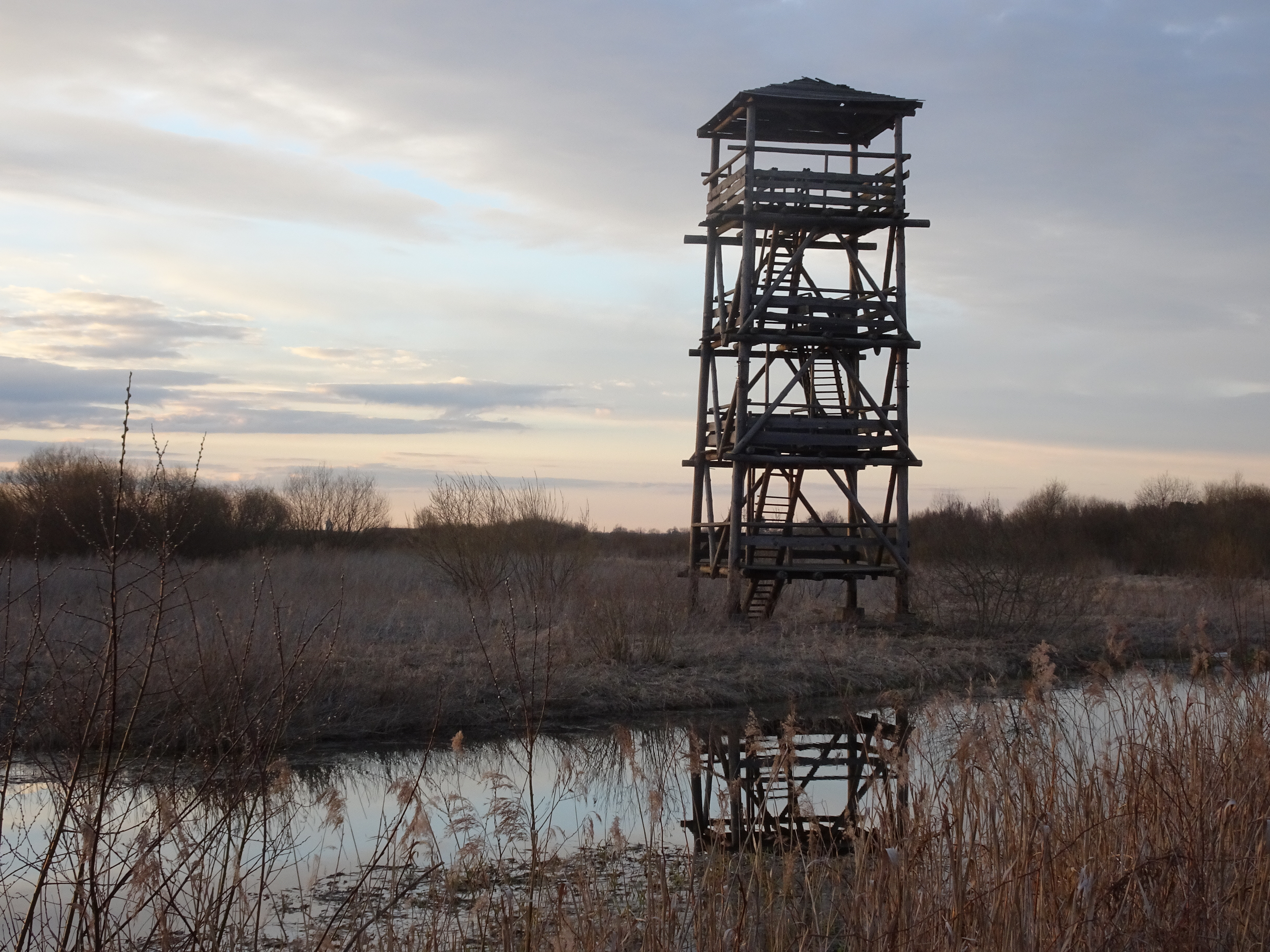
- Birdwatching tower at the Lake Aardla Nature Reserve

- Location in Estonia
- Coordinates: 58°19′N 26°47′E
- Country: Estonia
- County: Tartu County
- Parish: Kastre Parish
- Time zone: UTC+2 (EET)
  - Summer (DST): UTC+3 (EEST)

Aardla is a village in Kastre Parish, Tartu County in eastern Estonia.

The military commander August Kork (1887–1937) was born in Aardla.
