= Vladimir Lyubimov =

Soviet military leader

- Born: February 24, 1879; Gubinka, Samara province, Russian Empire
- Died: December 10, 1937 (aged 58); Kommunarka, Soviet Union
- Military career
- Allegiance: Russian Empire; Soviet Union
- Branch: Imperial Russian Army; Soviet Red Army
- Rank: Podpolkovnik (Russian Empire); Kombrig (Soviet Union)
- Units: 13th Infantry Division (Russian Empire); 5th Siberian Army Corps
- Commands: 8th Army (RSFSR); 5th Army (RSFSR)
- Conflicts: World War I Russian Civil War

Vladimir Vissarionovich Lyubimov (Russian: Владимир Виссарионович Любимов; February 24, 1879 – December 10, 1937) was a Soviet military leader.

== Early life and education ==
Lyubimov was born into an upper-class family. He graduated from the Samara men's gymnasium, and then the Kazan Junker School. In 1904, he participated in the Russian-Japanese war. After the war, he served in the 211th infantry reserve Evpatoria regiment, and then in the Lithuanian 51st infantry regiment. In 1914, he graduated from two courses of the Nikolaev Military Academy.

== Participation in World War I ==
Lyubimov was Captain of the 51st Lithuanian Regiment. After that, he was the senior adjutant of the headquarters of the 13th Infantry Division, and then the 5th Siberian Army Corps. He rose to the rank of Podpolkovnik (Lieutenant colonel).

== Participation in the civil war ==
Voluntarily joined the Red Army. In 1918–1920, he successively held the post of chief of the operational department of the headquarters of the 8th Army, chief of the 12th Infantry Division, chief of staff of the 8th army, commander of the 8th army, chief of staff of the 3rd army, chief of the 55th infantry division, chief of staff Caucasian Front, the commander of the Caucasian Labor Army, chief of staff of the 2nd Special Army, chief of staff of the 5th army.

== After the civil war ==
In 1920–22, Lyubimov was the chief of staff of the East Siberian District, in 1923–24, the chief of staff of the 12th Rifle Corps, and then the Chief of Staff of the 5th Army. In 1929, he graduated from KUVNAS at the Frunze Academy. In 1931, he was transferred to the reserve (in connection with the activities of the OGPU in the operation "Spring"). Starting in 1932, he was the military leader of the Rostov Road Institute.

== Arrest and death ==
In June 1937, due to political distrust, he was transferred to the reserve. In July 1937, he was arrested for allegedly participating in an anti-Soviet terrorist spy organization. On December 10, 1937, Lyubimov was sentenced to death and shot the same day.

Military offices
Preceded by Tikhon Khvesin	Commander of the 8th Army RSFSR; May 8 - July 2, 1919	Succeeded by Vladimir Selivachev
Preceded by Ieronim Uborevich	Commander of the 5th Army RSFSR; August 14–24, 1922	Succeeded by Kasyan Chaykovsky
