= Wacław Iwaszkiewicz-Rudoszański =

Polish general (1871–1922)

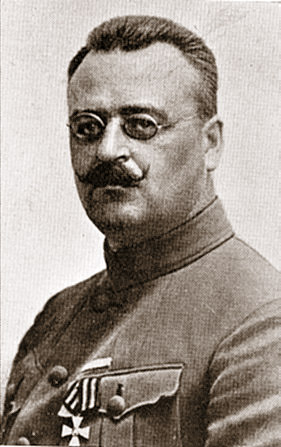
- Born: 26 August 1871; Omsk, Russian Empire
- Died: 25 November 1922 (aged 51); Warsaw, Second Polish Republic
- Military career
- Allegiance: Russian Empire (1891–1917); Second Polish Republic (1918–1921)
- Branch: Imperial Russian Army; Polish Army
- Service years: 1891–1921
- Rank: Generał dywizji (Major general)
- Conflicts: Russo-Japanese War; First World War; Polish–Ukrainian War; Polish–Soviet War
- Awards

Wacław Iwaszkiewicz-Rudoszański (26 August 1871 – 25 November 1922) was a Polish general.

== Biography ==
He was born in Omsk, then the capital of Akmola Oblast, part of the West Siberian General Government. His father was Witalis Iwaszkiewicz, a Pole exiled to Siberia for his participation in the January Uprising. His mother was Leokadia née Karafa-Korbut. After graduating from military schools in St. Petersburg in 1891, he began his service in the Russian Imperial Army. From 1892 he was an officer of the Russian infantry. In 1900 he took part in the intervention in China against the Boxer Rebellion.

During the Russo-Japanese War he took part in the defense of Port Arthur. During World War I, with the rank of colonel he commanded the 54th Siberian Rifle Regiment then an infantry division. For his participation in the Battle of Łódź in 1914 he was promoted to the rank of major general and awarded the golden saber. He took part in the defense of Warsaw against the German army in 1915. He was wounded near Riga. After the February Revolution and the overthrow of the tsar, he was active in the Military Union of Poles in Russia, becoming a member of Naczpol. From October 21, 1917, he commanded the 3rd Polish Rifle Division as part of the 1st Polish Corps of General Józef Dowbor-Muśnicki. As the commander of the division, he fought his way from Yelnya to Bobruisk and surrendered there on May 21, 1918 to the Imperial German Army.

As a general of the former 1st Polish Corps and the Russian army he was reassigned to Polish Army with the approval of his rank as a Major general. On November 16, 1918, he was appointed commander of the General District "Kielce". He commanded the units suppressing the anti-Jewish riots in Kielce on 11 and 12 November 1918.

On November 26, 1918, he became commander of the 1st Lithuanian-Belarusian Division, which he formed from Self-Defence of Lithuania and Belarus. From February 1919, he commanded operational groups in the Wołkowysk area, and from March 14, 1919, the Polish Army offensive against the units of the Ukrainian Galician Army surrounding Lviv. After breaking through to Lviv, he replaced General Tadeusz Rozwadowski as commander of the "East" Army. During the battles in Eastern Galicia and Volhynia, he pushed the Ukrainians back beyond the Zbruch River. During the Polish-Bolshevik War, he commanded the Galician-Volhynian, Galician, and Podolia Fronts.

On March 9, 1920, he asked the Commander-in-Chief to transfer him to the reserve or grant him a three-month leave. He justified his request with his poor health. The attached medical certificate shows that the front's medical chief, Lieutenant Colonel Bolesław Korolewicz, diagnosed him with atherosclerosis and subsequent weakening of the heart muscle. In the opinion of Dr. Korolewicz, his health condition at that time required him to refrain from performing any activities for a period of three months and to be referred for spa treatment.

In April 1920, during the Kiev offensive, he was the commander of the 6th Army. In August, during the Battle of Warsaw, he commanded the Southern Front. On October 1, 1921, he was retired, with the rank of lieutenant general, with the right to wear a uniform. He settled in Warsaw. From May 20, 1922, he was admitted to the Ujazdów Hospital.

He died on Saturday, November 25, 1922, at the Ujazdów Hospital, after a long, serious and incurable illness. Five days later in the Holy Cross Church in Warsaw, Cardinal Aleksander Kakowski held a funeral service. After the service the coffin with the general's remains was transported on a flatbed, with an honorary escort consisting of an infantry battalion and two cavalry squadrons, to the railway station. Coffin was transported to Lviv, where the funeral ceremony took place on Saturday, December 2. The funeral procession marched from the Lviv Cathedral to the Cemetery of the Defenders of Lwów, where the deceased was buried in the commanders' quarters.

After the occupation of Lviv in 1939 by the Red Army and its incorporation into the Ukrainian Soviet Socialist Republic, the Cemetery of the Defenders of Lwów was destroyed and desecrated. Maria Tereszczakówna, a Polish social activist, together with a group of several other people, in order to save the remains of Polish heroes buried in this cemetery, moved several bodies of distinguished Poles, including the body of General Iwaszkiewicz-Rudoszański, to another burial place. However, due to the deaths of direct witnesses and the previous lack of interest from Polish institutions, these places remain unknown to this day.

== Awards and decorations ==
- Polish:
  - Commander's Cross of Virtuti Militari (1922)
  - Silver Cross of Virtuti Militari (1920)
  - Commander's Cross of the Order of Polonia Restituta (29 December 1921)
  - Cross of Valour (1921)
- Russian:
  - Order of St. George, 4th Class
  - Order of Saint Vladimir, 3rd, 4th Class
  - Order of Saint Anna, 2nd, 3rd, 4th Class
  - Order of Saint Stanislaus, 2nd Class
  - Golden Weapon for Bravery
- From other countries:
  - Commander of the Legion of Honour (France, 1921)
  - Cross of Liberty, 1st Division, 2nd Class (Estonia, 1922)

== Bibliography ==
- Dziennik Personalny Ministerstwa Spraw Wojskowych.
- Tadeusz Kryska-Karski, Stanisław Żurakowski: Generałowie Polski niepodległej. Warszawa: Editions Spotkania, 1991.
- Andrzej Suchcitz: Generałowie wojny polsko-sowieckiej 1919-1920. Mały słownik biograficzny. Białystok: Ośrodek Badań Historii Wojskowej Muzeum Wojska w Białymstoku, 1993.
- Piotr Stawecki: Słownik biograficzny generałów Wojska Polskiego 1918-1939. Warszawa: Wydawnictwo Bellona, 1994. ISBN 83-11-08262-6.
- Bogusław Polak (red.): Kawalerowie Virtuti Militari 1792 – 1945. T. 2/1. Koszalin: Wydawnictwo Uczelniane Wyższej Szkoły Inżynierskiej w Koszalinie, 1991. ISBN 83-900510-0-1.
