= 3rd Army (RSFSR) =

Field army of the Red Army

The 3rd Army was a field army of the Red Army during the Russian Civil War. The 3rd Army was formed three times.

== History ==
=== First formation ===
The 3rd Army was created in February 1918 to fight against the Romanian military intervention in Bessarabia. It was formed in Odessa and other places in the Odessa Soviet Republic. It consisted of separate revolutionary squads, mainly Bolshevik, Leftist and Anarchist, as well as small parts of the old Russian army, which had fought in World War I on the Romanian Front. In the middle of February the Army was reinforced by 3,000 men of the Krasnogvardeysky detachment under command of Mikhail Muravjev, which arrived from Kiev. Until March 1918 the Army was named the Special Revolutionary Army of the Odessa District, or Special Odessa Army.

The Army took up positions on the left bank of the Dniester with headquarters in Tiraspol and as commander P. S. Lazarov. Grigory Kotovsky was commander of the Cavalry. The army was part of the armed forces of the Odessa Soviet Republic under command of Mikhail Muravjev. The task of the Special Odessa Army was not only to prevent the Romanian troops to advance in Transnistria towards Odessa, but also to bring Bessarabia back under the control of Soviet Russia.

The army repulsed attempts of the Romanians to get a bridgehead on the left bank of the Dniester River and on February 20 launched a counteroffensive. By March 2, Muravjev's troops had defeated the Romanians near Rîbnița and Slobozei. The Romanian Army command, still at war with the Central Powers, proposed a truce. The peace talks were held in Odessa and Iasi. On March 5–9, a joint protocol was signed on the cessation of the Soviet-Romanian armed conflict, under which Romania undertook to withdraw its troops from Bessarabia within two months and not to take any military or hostile action against the RSFSR. On March 8, The Soviet troops received an order to stop their military actions against the Romanian troops. However, the Romanian authorities observed that the Austro-German troops, which had started to occupy the territory of Ukraine on February 18 and which already had taken Kiev and Vinnitsa, would also soon occupy Odessa. Therefore, on March 9, Romania captured Akkerman, violating the reached agreement and completing the seizure of South Bessarabia. A few days later the armistice was annulled.

On March 3, Austro-Hungarian troops took Balta, thus threatening the rear of the southern Soviet forces. Komdarm Mikhail Muravjev ordered the Special Odessa Army to stop the advance of the Austro-Hungarian troops along the south-western railroad. Fighting broke out near the railway stations of Sloboda and Birzula on March 5–7, 1918 between Red troops and the 3rd infantry and 2nd Cavalry Divisions of the 12th Corps of the Austrian Army. In this battle, the Austrians lost more than 500 soldiers and officers killed. The defense of Birzula was led by the sailor-anarchist Anatoli Zhelezniakov. But the small and poorly organized Odessa Army could not withstand the regular Austro-Hungarian army and was forced to retreat to defensive positions 10 km north of Odessa. The Odessa Council, by an overwhelming majority, offered to surrender the city without a fight. Rumcherod also recognized that the defense of Odessa was useless. On March 12, the City Duma took over the power in Odessa and agreed with the Austrian command on the unimpeded evacuation of the Red Army. Mikhail Muravjev was forced to retreat with his Odessa Army to the East.

In the middle of March 1918, by decision of the Second All-Ukrainian Congress of Soviets, the Special Odessa Army received the name of 3rd Army. After leaving Odessa, one part of the army headed towards the Dnieper, and another part crossed into the Crimea. The right-wing units became part of the 1st Army, while other units joined the 5th Army of Kliment Voroshilov. The Tiraspol detachment became part of the 2nd Army.

In April 1918, the 3rd Army was situated around Lozova and had some 5,000 soldiers under command of E.I. Chikvanaia. It tried in vain to restrain the offensive of the German troops towards the Donbass. In late April, the shattered remains of the 3rd Army withdrew to the territory of RSFSR (Voronezh Province) and joined the 1st Special Army in the region of Liski.

=== Second formation ===
On July 20, 1918, the 3rd Army was created a second time from the detachments of the so-called north-Ural-Siberian front. It was part of the Eastern Front.
It operated in the region of Perm, Yekaterinburg and Ishim against parts of the rebellious Czechoslovak Legion and White Guards units. It participated in the Zlatoust-Chelyabinsk (July 1918), Yekaterinburg (Aug.-Sept. 1918) and Perm operations. After a hard battle, in which it suffered great losses, the 3rd Army was forced to abandon Perm on December 24, 1918.

After restoring its fighting capabilities, the 3rd Army conquered a number of settlements in February 1919 and stopped the enemy's offensive on the Vyatka River. In May–July 1919, it participated in the Counteroffensive of the Eastern front and retook Perm on July 1, 1919. Later in the year it also participated in the Petropavlovsk and Omsk offensive operations.

On January 15, 1920, the 3rd Army was temporarily transferred to the labour force and renamed the 1st Revolutionary Labour Army, within the framework of the economic policy of military communism.

=== Third formation ===
A new 3rd Army was created on June 11, 1920, by the command of the Western front from the troops of the southern group of the 15th Army, during the Soviet-Polish war.

The 3rd Army fought against the Poles around Dokshytsy and Parafyanovo (June–July), and participated in the July operation 1920. During the Battle of Warsaw (1920), if fought on the Central Front between Kock and Brody. In September, it was fought in the area of Druskininkai and Ashmyany, and was defeated in the Battle of the Niemen River. In November–December, it acted against the Bulak-Balakhovich detachments in Belarus.

On December 31, 1920, the 3rd Army was disbanded and merged with the 16 th Army.

== Commanders ==
=== Commanders ===
- Reingold Berzin (July 20 – November 29, 1918)
- Mikhail Lashevich (November 30, 1918 – March 5, 1919)
- Sergei Mezheninov (March 5 – August 26, 1919)
- Mikhail Alafusov (Acting, 26 August-6 October 1919)
- Mikhail Matiyasevich (October 7, 1919 – January 15, 1920).
- Vladimir Lazarevich (June 12 – October 18, 1920)
- Aleksander Belaya (Acting, 18–24 October 1920)
- Nikolai Kakurin (October 24-December 31, 1920).

=== Members of the Revolutionary Military Council include ===
- Ivar Smilga
- Mikhail Lashevich
- Valentin Trifonov
- Nikolay Muralov
- Nikolai Kuzmin
