= Tikhon Khvesin =

- Born: September 21, 1894 (September 9 O.S.); Orenburg, Russian Empire
- Died: February 10, 1938 Moscow, RSFSR, Soviet Union
- Allegiance: Russian Empire; Soviet Union
- Branch: Imperial Russian Army; Soviet Red Army
- Commands: 8th Army (RSFSR); 4th Army (RSFSR)
- Conflicts: World War I; Russian Civil War; Vyoshenskaya Uprising

Tikhon Serafimovich Khvesin (Russian: Тихон Серафимович Хвесин; September 21, 1894 – February 10, 1938) was a Soviet military officer and statesman, as well as chairman of the Saratov Regional Executive Committee (1935–1936).

== Biography ==
Khvesin was born in a working-class family. In 1911 he joined the RSDLP. During World War I he rose to the rank of non-commissioned officer. In 1918 he became a military commissar of the Saratov province.

During the Civil War, he commanded many military units: in September–November 1918 - the 4th Army of the Eastern Front, in March–May 1919 - the 8th Army of the Southern Front, in May–June 1919 he led the Expeditionary Group, which suppressed Cossack uprisings on the Don, then was an assistant commander of the Orenburg group of forces and the 1st Army, in 1920 - an assistant commander of the Special Group of Forces of the Turkestan Front, then was transferred to the Polish Front, where he became commander of the Mozyr Group.

In 1921-1923 he was an assistant commander of the Ural Military District, in 1922-1923 he was the head of the Main Directorate of Police, from 1924 he worked in civilian institutions, was chairman of the USSR State Planning Commission.

Since 1934 he is the chairman of the organizing committee of the All-Russian Central Executive Committee for the Saratov Territory, and in January 1935 - January 1936 - chairman of the executive committee of the Saratov Regional Council.

Then - until September 1937 he was the first deputy commissar of communal services of the RSFSR.

On September 23, 1937, he was arrested and charged with participation in a counter-revolutionary terrorist organization. The military collegium of the Supreme Court of the USSR on February 8, 1938, sentenced him to death. The verdict was executed on February 10, 1938. On October 5, 1955, T. S. Khvesin was posthumously rehabilitated.

== Works ==
- How industry is organized and operates during the war. M. - L., 1928.

== Memory ==
A street in Saratov was named in honor of Khvesin in 1976.

Military offices
Preceded by	Commander of the 4th Army RSFSR; September 10 - November 5, 1918	Succeeded by
Preceded by Mikhail Tukhachevsky	Commander of the 8th Army RSFSR; March 15 - May 8, 1919	Succeeded by Vladimir Lyubimov
