= Vladimir Lazarevich =

Soviet military commander (1882–1938)

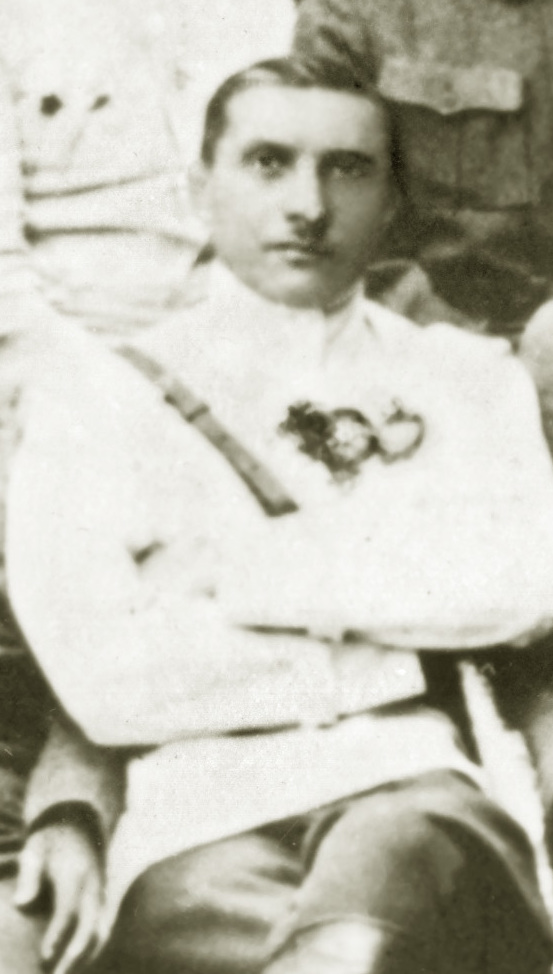
Lazarevich in 1921

Vladimir Salamanovich Lazarevich (Russian: Владимир Саламанович Лазаревич; also Uladzimir Salamonavič Lazarevič, Belarusian: Уладзімір Саламонавіч Лазарэвіч; 15 September 1882 – 20 June 1938) was a Soviet military commander, who commanded several military units of the Red Army during the Russian Civil War.

== Biography ==
Lazarevich was born into a Belarusian noble family. He entered the Vilnius Military School in 1903 and studied at the General Staff Academy in Saint Petersburg between 1909 and 1912.

He participated in the First World War, first as senior adjutant at the headquarters of the 2nd Army Corps and ending the war as Lieutenant Colonel in 1917. After the October Revolution of 1917, he was elected chief of staff of the 18th Army Corps.

In 1918 he voluntarily joined the Red Army. He fought in the Russian Civil War of 1918–1920 first in the East, as chief of staff of the 4th Army (November 1918 – March 1919), of the Southern Group of the Eastern Front Forces (March–May 1919), and as commander of the 4th Army (May – November 1919), in which capacity he participated in the successful Counteroffensive of the Eastern Front against the forces of Admiral Kolchak.

From November 1919 to March 1920, he became Chief of Staff of the Western Front, and then commander of the 3rd Army (June – October 1920), with which he fought in the Polish–Bolshevik War of 1920. He fought in the Battle of Warsaw (1920), where he managed to pull back his divisions over the Vistula. But he did not meet expectations in the Battle of the Niemen River, where his Army was attacked from the rear and suffered heavy casualties.

He was moved to command the 4th Army again on the Southern Front (October 1920 – February 1921). From February 1921 to January 1922, he became commander of the Turkestan Front, where he was in charge of suppressing the Counter-revolutionary Basmachi movement.

In the twenties and thirties, he held various command positions and was a lecturer, also at the Zhukovsky Air Force Engineering Academy of which he was the director in 1925–1927. On November 23, 1935, he received the rank of Komdiv.

He was arrested on February 4, 1938, and on June 20, he was sentenced to be shot by the Military Collegium of the Supreme Court of the Soviet Union, on charges of belonging to a military conspiracy. The verdict was executed on the same day and he was buried at the Kommunarka shooting ground.

He was rehabilitated in 1956.

== Sources ==
- GRWAR.RU
- The Great Soviet Encyclopedia (1979)
