= Franciszek Krajowski =

Polish general (1861–1932)

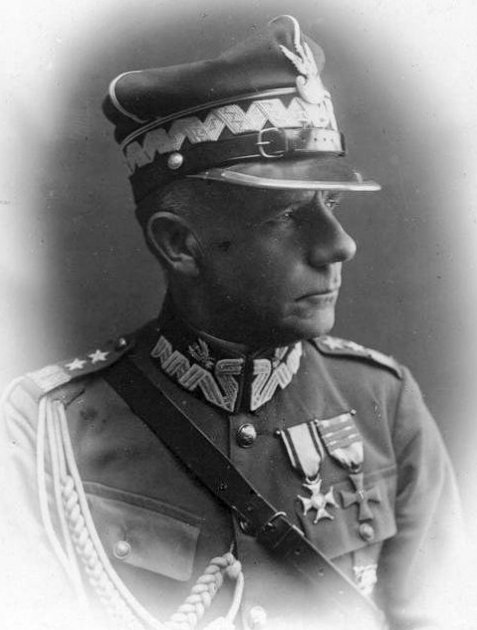
Krajowski circa 1928

Franciszek Krajowski (Czech: František Králíček; 30 September 1861 in Velešín – 22 November 1932 in Brest) was a Czech-Polish military officer and a General of the Polish Army.
