= 4th Army (RSFSR) =

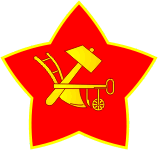

The 4th Army was a field army of the Red Army during the Russian Civil War, which was formed four times between the beginning of March 1918 and March 1921.

== History ==
=== First formation ===
On March 17, 1918, the Second All-Ukrainian Congress of Soviets decided to create armed forces to counter foreign and contra-revolutionary forces. Five armies of approximately 3,000 -3,500 men were created. In fact, these armies were only brigades with limited combat capabilities. The 4th Army was created near the city of Poltava under command of Vassili Kikvidze. The army counted 3,000 infantry, 200 cavalry, one armored train, and four guns. The 4th Army, now under command of Yuriy Sablin, tried in vain to defend Kharkiv against the advancing German Army. After its defeat, one part joined the Voronezh Detachment and the other part was added to the 1st Don Army operating in Ukraine in the area of the Donets river.

=== Second formation ===
On June 20, 1918, the 4th Army was created a second time as part of the Eastern Front.
In June 1918, the 4th Army fought against the White Guards troops in the Transvolga Region. In August, it was located around Volsk, and then defended the Khvalynsk area. In November 1918, it participated in the offensive of the Eastern Front and took Samara. In January 1919, it took Oral. In March, it took part in the suppression of rebellions in the Stavropol, Melekessk and Syzransk counties, and then moved to Lbichensk, Slymhinskaya, Oral and Guriev to fight against the Spring Offensive of the Russian Army (1919). Between August 15, 1919 and April 18, 1920, it was part of Southern group of Armies of the Eastern Front and of the Turkestan Front. It was disbanded on April 23, 1920 and the Army administration was transferred to the Transvolga Military District and the 2nd revolutionary Labor Army.

=== Third formation ===
The 4th Army was created a third time on June 11, 1920 from the northern group of the 15th Army, as part of the Western Front to fight in the Soviet-Polish War.

The offensive of the 4th Army of the Western Front began on July 2, 1920, near the Latvian border in the city of Dzisna. In five weeks time, the Army advanced more than 800 kilometers, occupying a significant part of the territories of Belarus and Poland, including: Święcany, Vilnius, Grodno, Mława, Ciechanów, etc. By August 16, 1920, the Polish Army had been thrown back behind the Wkra river.

On August 17, 1920, the day before the planned beginning of the decisive Soviet offensive on the Vistula, Pilsudski's army undertook a powerful counteroffensive. The Polish cavalry struck at the junction of the 4th and 15th Armies. As a result, the 4th Army was utterly defeated. The 4th Army and the 3rd Cavalry Corps almost ceased to exist as fighting units as many soldiers were forced to flee into German territory, where they were interned.

By 26 August 1920, the Western Front line had been stabilized. From September 14, 1920, replenished with fresh divisions, the 4th Army again participated in heavy fighting in Belarus, including the Battle of Kobryń (1920), after which it retreated to the Slutsk area. The fighting only ended after the signing of the Armistice in October 1920. On October 18, 1920 the 4th Army was disbanded and the remaining troops were transferred to the 16th Army.

=== Fourth formation ===
On November 12, 1920 the 4th Army was created a fourth time on the Southern Front, also from troops of the former 13th Army.
The Army fought in the Siege of Perekop (1920) against the Army of Wrangel and participated in the conquest of the Kerch Peninsula.
On March 25, 1921, the 4th Army was disbanded and the military units were handed over to the Caucasian front and the Kharkiv Military district. In April, the field administration of the 4th Army was disbanded.

== Commanders ==
=== Commanders ===
- A. A. Rzhevsky (20.06 1918 – 01.09 1918)
- Tikhon Hvesin (10.09 1918 - 05.11 1918)
- Aleksandr Baltiysky (05.11 1918 – 31.01 1919)
- Mikhail Frunze (31.01 1919 − 04.05 1919)
- Leonty Ugryumov (acting, 04.05 1919 – 08.05 1919)
- Konstantin Avksentevsky (08.05 1919 – 06.08 1919)
- Vladimir Lazarevich (06.08 1919 – 08.10 1919)
- Gaspar Voskanyan (08.10 1919 – 23.04 1920).
- Evgeni Sergeyev (18.06 1920 – 28.07 1920)
- Vladimir Melikov (acting, 28.07 1920 – 06.08 1920)
- Aleksandr Shuvayev (acting, 06.08 1920 – 17.10 1920)
- Nikolai Kakurin (acting, 17.10.1920 – 22.10, 1920).
- Vladimir Lazarevich (22.10 1920 – 10.02 1921)
- Aleksandr Beloi (11.02 1921 – 25.03 1921).
