= August Kork =

Estonian Soviet general (1887–1937)

- August Kork
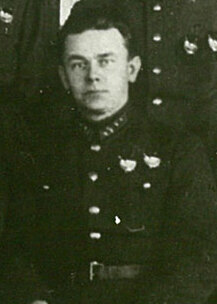
- Born: 2 August [O.S. 22 July] 1887; Aardla, Kreis Dorpat, Governorate of Livonia, Russian Empire
- Died: 12 June 1937 (aged 49); Kommunarka shooting ground, Moscow, Soviet Union
- Burial place: Donskoye Cemetery
- Spouse: Yekaterina Mikhailovna
- Military career
- Allegiance: Russian Empire; RSFSR; Soviet Union
- Branch: Imperial Russian Army; Red Army
- Service years: 1908–1917; 1918–1937
- Rank: Komandarm, 2nd rank
- Commands: 15th Army; 6th Army; Kharkov Military District; Turkestan Front; Western Military District; Red Banner Caucasus Army; Belorussian Military District; Leningrad Military District; Moscow Military District; Frunze Military Academy
- Conflicts: World War I; Russian Civil War; Western Front; Soviet westward offensive of 1918–1919; Estonian War; Battle of Petrograd; Pskov Opeartion; Final Operations againts Wrangelshchina; Northern Taurida Operation; Siege of Perekop (1920); Polish–Soviet War; July Operation (1920); Battle of the Bug; Battle of Warsaw (1920)
- Awards: Order of the Red Banner (2); Honorary Revolutionary Weapon; Order of Saint Anna (2nd, 3rd, and 4th classes); Order of Saint Stanislaus, 2nd and 3rd classes

August Ivanovich Kork (Russian: Август Иванович Корк, also Аугуст Яанович Корк; 2 August [O.S. 22 July] 1887 – 12 June 1937) was an Estonian Soviet Red Army commander (Komandarm 2nd rank) who was tried and executed during the Great Purge in 1937.

Kork became an officer of the Imperial Russian Army and graduated from the General Staff Academy. He served as a staff officer during World War I and in February 1917 was at the Western Front headquarters. Kork became a Bolshevik and joined the Red Army. He fought in the Russian Civil War, initially as chief of staff of the Bolshevik-sponsored Estonian Red Army and then as assistant commander of the 7th Army. In July 1919 Kork became commander of the 15th Army, defeating Nikolai Yudenich's Northwestern Army and defending Petrograd. He led the army in the Polish–Soviet War and in October 1920 became commander of the 6th Army, which defeated the last White Army in Crimea, led by Pyotr Nikolayevich Wrangel.

After the end of the campaign, Kork took command of the Kharkov Military District and later became the assistant commander of the Armed Forces of Ukraine and the Crimea. In October 1922 he took command of the Turkestan Front, fighting against Basmachi rebels. During the late 1920s, Kork commanded the Caucasus Army, several military districts, and was the Soviet military attaché in Germany between 1928 and 1929. Returning from Germany, Kork became commander of the Moscow Military District. In 1935 he became head of the Frunze Military Academy with the rank of Komandarm 2nd rank. At this time he was the highest-ranking Estonian Red Army officer. During the Great Purge, Kork was arrested and shot as part of the Case of Trotskyist Anti-Soviet Military Organization. He was acquitted twenty years later.

== Early life and career ==
Kork was born on 2 August 1887 in the village of Aardla in the Governorate of Livonia to a peasant family. After graduating from four years of college in Tartu in 1905, Kork entered the Vilna Cadet School on 31 August. In 1907, he transferred to the Chuguyev Military School after the educational system was reorganized. Kork graduated on 15 June 1908 as a Podporuchik and served in the 98th Yuryevsky Infantry Regiment in Dvinsk. On 14 June 1911, he was promoted to Poruchik. In 1911, he entered the General Staff Academy, from which he graduated in 1914 in the first class. For his academic achievements, Kork received the Order of Saint Stanislaus 3rd class on 8 May. He was seconded to the Vilno Military District headquarters.

Kork fought in World War I on the Northwestern Front and the Western Front. In October 1914, he was awarded the Order of Saint Anna 3rd class with Swords. On 1 April 1915, he was awarded the Order of Saint Stanislaus 2nd class with Swords. Kork became an adjutant on the staff of the 3rd Siberian Army Corps and was promoted to Staff captain on 14 June. On 16 November, Kork received the Order of Saint Anna 4th class. At the same time, he became an adjutant at the headquarters of the 8th Siberian Rifle Division. On 25 or 30 December he was transferred to the 10th Army headquarters. He also served with the 20th Army Corps and the Office of the Quartermaster General on the Staff of the Western Front. On 15 August 1916, he was promoted to captain. In 1917, he graduated from the Observer-Pilot Military School. On 25 February, Kork became an officer for Aircraft Orders on the Staff of the Western Front. He was promoted to lieutenant colonel. On 31 March, Kork was awarded the Order of Saint Anna 2nd class with Swords. Between August 1917 and February 1918 he was chairman of the Soldiers' Committee of the Western Front.

== Russian Civil War ==
In June 1918, Kork joined the Red Army. He worked at the Vseroglavshtab (All-Russian Main Staff) and from October headed the Operations section and the 9th Army's Operational-Surveillance Department. In December, Kork became an advisor to the People's Commissariat for Military Affairs of the Bolshevik-sponsored Estonian Workers' Commune. Between February and May 1919, he was chief of staff of the Estonian Red Army. In June, he became the assistant commander of the 7th Army. Between 31 July and 15 October 1919 and 22 October, 1919 and 16 October 1920 Kork led the 15th Army. The army fought against the White Northwest Army led by Nikolai Yudenich. Mikhail Tukhachevsky repeatedly noted Kork's ability to manage troops in combat and Sergey Kamenev considered him the best of the Western Front army commanders. On 26 October 1919 Kork began an attack on Luga, capturing it on 31 October. The army advanced north towards Volosovo, forcing the Northwest Army to retreat. On 6 November the army linked up with the 5th Latvian Regiment and captured Volosovo. For operations around Gdov in October 1919 he was awarded the Order of the Red Banner.

Kork led the 15th Army in the Polish–Soviet War. On 17 May 1920, the army attacked Minsk. By 23 May, the army had crossed the Berezina River, advancing 70 miles (110 km). Polish resistance stiffened the next day, stopping the army's advance. After Polish counterattacks had pushed back the 15th Army and other Red Army units, Mikhail Tukhachevsky launched a second Soviet offensive in July 1920. By 22 July the army had crossed the Neman. Kork was considered of the best commanders of the Western Front and his army won a major victory at the Battle of the Bug. After the Polish counteroffensive, two of the army's divisions were interned in East Prussia. For actions in the Polish-Soviet War in July 1920 Kork was awarded a second Order of the Red Banner.

He became commander of the 6th Army on 26 October 1920, fighting against the last White Army led by Pyotr Nikolayevich Wrangel in Crimea. The 6th Army's attack began two days later. On 29 October it had captured Perekop in an attempt to encircle White forces north of the isthmus, but the Soviet cavalry units that were to complete the encirclement failed and many of Wrangel's troops escaped. On 8 November the 6th Army captured the Turkish Wall and began its advance south. Wrangel issued evacuation orders and by 16 November most of the White troops had evacuated. Kork was awarded an Honorary Revolutionary Weapon on 30 December 1920 for the capture of Perekop and Yushunskaya positions and the occupation of Crimea.

== Interwar ==
On 16 May 1921 Kork became commander of the Kharkov Military District. Between 30 June and 4 October, 1922 Kork was the assistant commander of the Armed Forces of Ukraine and the Crimea. On 4 October 1922 he took command of the Turkestan Front, fighting against the Basmachi. From July to December 1923 Kork was the First Assistant Chief of the Air Fleet of the Soviet Union. He became assistant commander and then commander of the Western Military District. Between February and November 1925, Kork led the Red Banner Caucasus Army. In November 1925, he became commander of the Western Military District again. In 1927, he joined the Communist Party of the Soviet Union. Between May 1927 and May 1928, he led the Leningrad Military District. In June 1928, Kork was sent to Berlin as the Soviet military attaché there. After his return to the Soviet Union in May 1929, Kork became head of the Red Army's supply. In November of that year, he was appointed commander of the Moscow Military District. Kork became a member of the Central Executive Committee of the Soviet Union. He commanded the Frunze Military Academy and was a Komandarm 2nd rank from November 1935. Kork lived in an apartment in the House on the Embankment.

Kork was arrested on 12 May (16 May according to Robert Conquest) 1937. Kork initially denied the charges but signed a confession on 18 May. The confession stated that Avel Enukidze had involved him in a "rightist conspiracy" connected to Vitovt Putna and Vitaly Primakov's "Trotskyite group". Four days later, Robert Eideman was arrested for signing Kork's party recommendation. After the arrest of Ieronim Uborevich on 29 May, Kork had a confrontation session with him. At the secret trial on 11 June, known as the Case of Trotskyist Anti-Soviet Military Organization, Kork did not answer when asked if he had conducted spying. He was convicted of "involvement in a military conspiracy in the Red Army and in preparing to overthrow Soviet power through an armed uprising and the defeat of the Soviet Union in a future war." He was shot in Moscow the next day and buried in the Donskoye Cemetery. The Frunze Military Academy was purged. On 31 January 1957 Kork was "rehabilitated" (acquitted) for "lack of evidence."

== Personal life ==
Kork married Yekaterina Mikhailovna (born 1894). In June 1937, after Kork's arrest, Yekaterina was exiled to Astrakhan, where she was arrested on 5 September. She and other wives of executed military leaders were moved back to Moscow and subjected to torture and interrogation. On 13 July 1941 she was sentenced to death and was shot at the Kommunarka shooting ground on 28 July.
