= 15th Army (RSFSR) =

The 15th Army was a field army of the Red Army during the Russian Civil War and Polish-Soviet War, which existed between 7 June 1919 and 26 December 1920.

== History ==
The 15th Army was formed on 7 June 1919 by transformation of the Army of Soviet Latvia which existed since 4 January 1919. The Army of Soviet Latvia was operationally subordinated to the command of the Northern Front, and on 19 February 1919, became part of the newly formed Western Front. The army headquarters was stationed in Daugavpils.

The 15th Army conducted in July 1919 defensive battles against Estonian troops and withdrew under the onslaught of enemy forces from the territory of Latvia, except Latgale. In August 1919 the 15th Army conducted the Pskov operation and liberated Pskov. In September–October 1919, she defended Petrograd against the forces of Nikolai Yudenich, and led in October–November a counter-offensive towards Luga, Volosovo, Gdov and Yamburg, thus participating in the defeat of Yudenich's Northwestern Army.

Since July 1919 the left flank of the Army had been fighting defensive battles against the advancing Polish troops in Belorussia. After the final defeat of Yudenich, the 15th Army was able to concentrate all its forces against the Polish Army.

In the spring and summer of 1920, the 15th Army was part of the attack group of the Western Front and acted against the First Polish Army. In May 1920, she attacked near Švenčionys, Maladzyechna and Zembin, but was stopped by the enemy's attack in the rear. In July 1920, she conquered Molodechno and Lida. During the Battle of Warsaw (1920) she forced the Niemen and Narew rivers and advanced towards the Wkra River north of Warsaw, but was then forced to retreat to the East. In September–October 1920 she defended the approaches to Minsk.

In early October the 15th Army was put into reserve. On 26 December 1920, the administration of the 15th Army was disbanded, and the troops transferred to the 3rd Army.

== Commanders ==
=== Commanders ===
- Jukums Vācietis (06.01.1919 — 10.03.1919),
- Pēteris Slavens (10.03.1919 — 07.06.1919).
- Pēteris Slavens (07.06.1919 — 25.06.1919)
- Sergei Kharlamov (25.06.1919 — 31.07.1919)
- August Kork (31.07.1919 — 15.10.1919)
- Aleksander Kukk (15.10.1919 — 22.10.1919)
- August Kork (22.10.1919 — 16.10.1920)
- B.L. Nеgrodov (16.10.1920 — 25.10.1920)
- Sergei Mezheninov (25.10.1920 — 26.12.1920)

=== Chief of Staff ===
- Parfeniy Maigur (06.01.1919 — 07.06.1919),
- Aleksander Kukk (26.09.1919 — 24.09.1920)

Members of the Revolutionary Military Council include

- Arkady Rosengolts (9.06.1920 — 26.09.1920)
- Mikhail Lashevich (29.08.1920 — 26.12.1920)
