= Kombat (military rank) =

1918–1935 rank within the Red Army

Battalion commander Командир батальона
- Jacket collar patch and gymnastyorka
- Country: Soviet Union
- Service branch: Red Army; Ukrainian Soviet Army
- Abbreviation: Kombat
- Formation: 1918
- Abolished: 1935
- Equivalent ranks: Ship commander, 2nd class

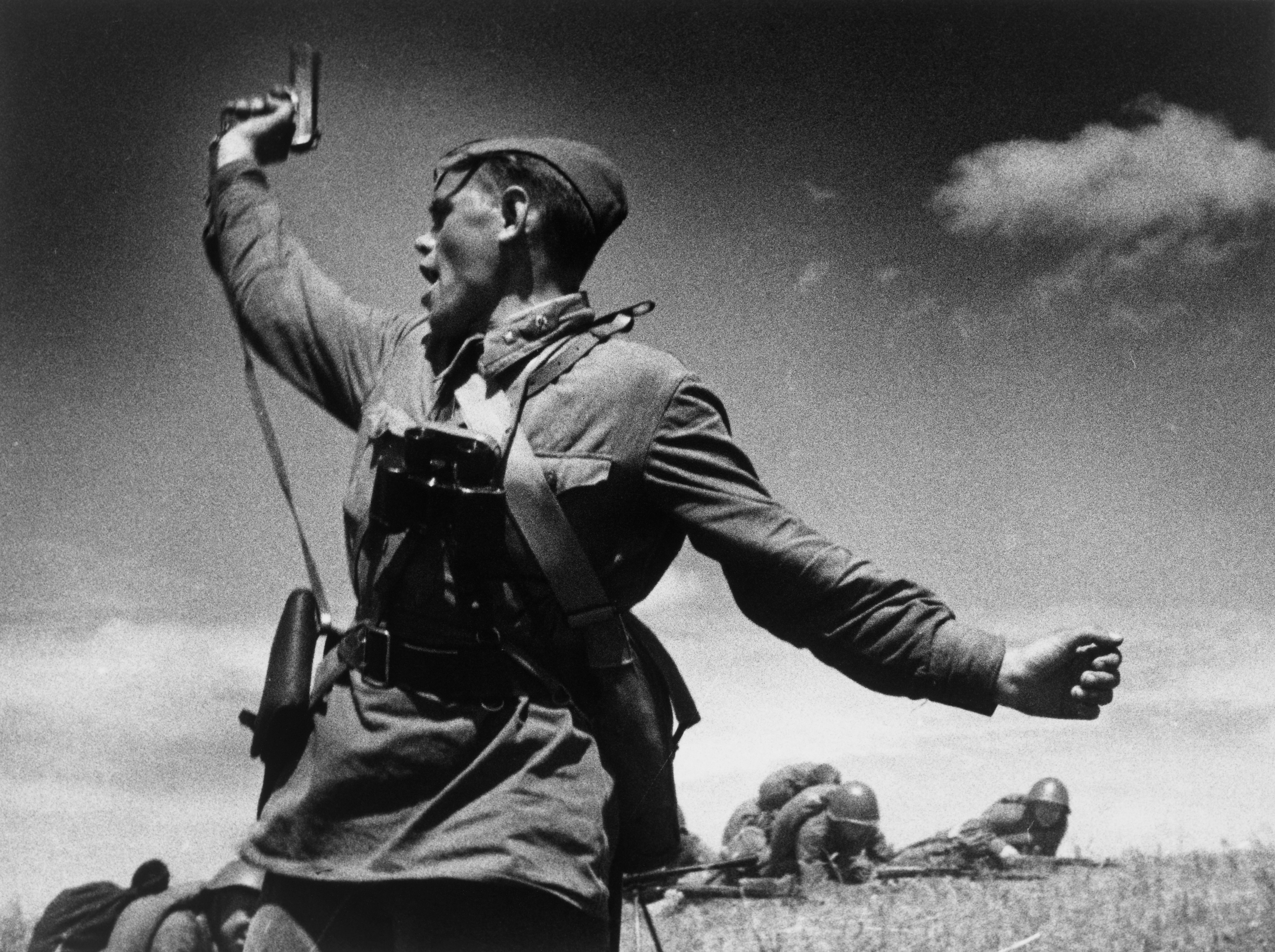
Kombat, a famous World War II photo by Max Alpert, depicting battalion commander A. Yeremenko leading his soldiers to the assault.

Kombat (Russian: комбат) is the abbreviation from Battalion commander (Russian: Командир батальона, romanized: Komandir bataljona). It was a military rank in the Red Army from 1918 to 1935. At that time it was roughly equivalent to the rank of captain.

Etymologically, the word Komandir (Commander) is sandwiched with the word Batalyona ([of the] Battalion) to make Kombat, similar to compound words in the English language. Combined words like Kombat were commonly used by the Soviet government during the Stalin era such as Komdiv (Division Commander), Komkor (Corps Commander), Kombrig (Brigade Commander), and Komandarm (Army Commander).

In popular culture, as for the 50th anniversary of Victory Day, folk rock band Lyube made the World War II song "Kombat" in 1995, which won cultural significance and many awards, leading even Vladimir Putin to commend the band.

It is also an informal Russian language abbreviation for the military commander's position for an officer in command of a battalion or an artillery battery.

== See also ==
- Ranks and insignia of the Red Army and Navy 1918–1935
