= Military ranks of the Soviet Union =

The military ranks of the Soviet Union were those introduced after the October Revolution of 1917. At that time the Imperial Russian Table of Ranks was abolished, as were the privileges of the pre-Soviet Russian nobility.

Immediately after the Revolution, personal military ranks were abandoned in favour of a system of positional ranks, which were acronyms of the full position names. For example, KomKor was an acronym of Corps Commander, KomDiv was an acronym of Division Commander, KomBrig stood for Brigade Commander, KomBat stood for Battalion Commander, and so forth. These acronyms have survived as informal position names to the present day.

Personal ranks were reintroduced in 1935, and general officer ranks were restored in May 1940. Although they underwent some modifications, the ranks were based on those of the Russian Empire. Modified Imperial-style rank insignia were reintroduced in 1943.

The Soviet ranks ceased to be used after the 1991 dissolution of the Soviet Union, although the military ranks and insignia of the modern Russian Federation and Ukraine have been largely adopted from the Soviet system.

== History ==
=== 1918–1935 ===
The early Red Army abandoned the institution of a professional officer corps as a "heritage of tsarism" in the course of the Revolution. In particular, the Bolsheviks condemned the use of the word "officer" and used the word "commander" instead. The Red Army abandoned epaulettes and ranks, using purely functional titles such as "Division Commander", "Corps Commander", and similar titles. In 1924 it supplemented this system with "service categories", from K-1 (lowest) to K-14 (highest). The service categories essentially operated as ranks in disguise: they indicated the experience and qualifications of a commander. The insignia now denoted the category, not the position of a commander. However, one still had to use functional titles to address commanders, which could become as awkward as "comrade deputy head-of-staff of corps". If one did not know a commander's position, one used one of the possible positions - for example: "Regiment Commander" for K-9. This rank system stayed on for a decade.

=== 1935–1940 ===
On September 22, 1935, the Red Army abandoned service categories and introduced personal ranks. These ranks, however, used a unique mix of functional titles and traditional ranks. For example, the ranks included "Lieutenant" and "Comdiv" (Комдив, Division Commander). Further complications ensued from the functional and categorical ranks for political officers (e.g., "Brigade Commissar", "Army Commissar 2nd Rank"), for technical corps (e.g., "Engineer 3rd Rank", "Division Engineer"), for administrative, medical and other non-combatant branches. Rank insignia then used both upside-down chevrons on the sleeve and collar marks. The rank of Marshal of the Soviet Union was also introduced.

=== 1940–1943 ===
On May 7, 1940, further modifications to the system took place. The ranks of "General" or "Admiral" replaced the senior functional ranks of Combrig, Comdiv, Comcor, Comandarm; the other senior functional ranks ("Division Commissar", "Division Engineer", etc.) remained unaffected. The Arm or Service distinctions remained (e.g. General of Cavalry, Marshal of Armoured Troops). On November 2, 1940, the system underwent further modification with the abolition of functional ranks for NCOs and the reintroduction of the Podpolkovnik (sub-colonel) rank. For the most part the new system restored that used by the Imperial Russian Army after its participation in World War I.

In early 1942 all the functional ranks in technical and administrative corps became regularized ranks (e.g., "Engineer Major", "Engineer Colonel", "Captain Intendant Service", etc.). On October 9, 1942, the authorities abolished the system of military commissars, together with the commissar ranks, and they were completely integrated into the regular officer corps. The functional ranks remained only in the medical, veterinary, and legislative corps, and Private became the basic rank for the enlisted and NCOs.

=== 1943–1955 ===
In early 1943 a unification of the system saw the abolition of all the remaining functional ranks. The word "officer" became officially endorsed, together with the epaulettes that superseded the previous rank insignia, styled like the Imperial Russian Army before, and Marshal and Chief Marshal ranks created for the various arms and branch commands of the Red Army and the Red Army Air Forces save for the infantry (even through the Artillery branch was the first to have one in 1942) with Marshal ranks being equal to General of the Army and Chief Marshal ranks being equal to Marshal of the Soviet Union.

The ranks and insignia of 1943 did not change much until the last days of the USSR; the contemporary Russian Ground Forces uses largely the same system. The old functional ranks of Combat (Battalion or Battery Commander), Combrig (Brigade Commander) and Comdiv (Division Commander) continue in informal use.

After the war, the rank of Generalissimo of the Soviet Union was proposed to Joseph Stalin in his role as the Supreme Commander of the Armed Forces, however, he refused the proposal of the rank several times. The rank insignia featured the USSR arms above a large Marshal's Star surrounded by a wreath.

=== 1955–1991 ===
1963 saw all Starshina insignia in the Army and Air Force change to their final design.

In 1970 all Starshinas became full-time senior non-commissioned officers and enlisted personnel and the new NCO rank of Praporshchik became a Warrant Officer rank, with a new rank of Senior Praporshchik created for senior rank holders later in 1981. And in 1974, Generals of the Army had one star on their shoulder epaulets rather than four with surrounding wreaths. The final rank structure from these reforms stayed well until the Union's dissolution and is the basis for the current ranks of the Russian Ground Forces.

These ranks also became the basic ranks for the Soviet Air Forces in 1918 and the Soviet Air Defense Forces (from 1932 to 1949 part of the Soviet Air Force and the Red Army, 1949 independent branch, and from 1954 a full-service arm of the Soviet Armed Forces), and from 1991 onward became the basis for the present ranks of the Russian Air Force (including the Air Defense Forces from 1998 onward) and from 2001, the Russian Aerospace Defence Forces (Formerly the Space Forces). The only exceptions were the use of the ranks of Marshal of Aviation and Chief Marshal of Aviation, which replaced the rank of General of the Army and the rank of Marshal of the Soviet Union until the latter became the highest officer rank in 1993.

=== Naval ranks and rates ===
In 1918, the Soviet Navy was raised from the pro-Bolshevik sailors and officers of the Imperial Russian Navy as the Workers' and Peasants' Red Fleet by a decree by the Soviet Council of People's Commissars. The ranks and rates were, just like in their counterparts in the Army, personal positions for officers, Petty Officers, and seaman rates. The former officers of the IRN who joined the ranks of this new navy retained their ranks with the abbreviation "b." meaning "former" while the new officers were addressed by their positional ranks. They stayed that way until 1925 when new ranks and rates were created. The rank insignia for the 1918–25 ranks were on the sleeve and cuff.

Most of the officer ranks were revived in 1935, save for the high-ranking officers, and the new PO rank of Squad Commander. The PO rank of Starshina was retained, however.

In 1939 all flag officer ranks were reinstated and Midshipman became the highest enlisted rating in the Navy, and in the course of the Great Patriotic War, all Redfleetmen became Seamen in another rank change. In 1943 all naval rank insignia became uniform in the fleet and ground forces. Uniquely, the ranks of the Soviet Naval Infantry, Soviet Naval Aviation, and the other ground services remained army-styled similar to their Red Army counterparts but the rank insignia became uniform. The Admiral of the Fleet rank was also created by then. The rank insignia was now also seen on epaulettes: black on-duty dresses and dark blue and gold on all full and ceremonial dresses for the fleet forces, with air force blue borders for the aviation branch and red borders for the coastal defense and naval infantry branch. In 1952 the senior enlisted rating's insignia (until 1972, Midshipman and from then on, Chief Ship Petty Officer) changed to its final design.

1955 saw the renaming of the Admiral of the Fleet rank into that of Admiral of the Fleet of the Soviet Union and was now equivalent to that of a Marshal of the Soviet Union. The shoulder insignia for fleet admirals and all officers' sleeve insignia changed in the following decade as the Admiral of the Fleet rank was revived, now between Admirals and Admirals of the Fleet of the Soviet Union.

1972 saw Midshipmen's status raised to warrant officers with Chief Ship Petty Officers replacing their former roles as the highest enlisted ratings.

== Rank comparisons ==
The Red Army abolished all personal officer and general ranks, retaining only personal positions. Thus, a komvzvoda (platoon commander) was a position for an officer who would typically hold a junior lieutenant or lieutenant rank, komroty (company commander) was equivalent of captain, kombat (battalion commander) was an equivalent of major, and kompolka was an equivalent of lieutenant colonel or colonel.

Even though traditional personal ranks for Red Army officers were re-established in 1935, general ranks were not introduced until 1940, probably because they were associated with the White Army movement. So, in 1935–1940 the personal rank system in the Red Army consisted of the following General-grade ranks:

- kombrig (brigade commander), a brigadier general equivalent
- komdiv (division commander), a major general equivalent
- komkor (corps commander), a lieutenant general equivalent
- komandarm 2-go ranga (army commander 2nd rank), a lieutenant general equivalent, and a colonel general equivalent
- komandarm 1-go ranga (army commander 1st rank), a front commander or supreme commander position, and an equivalent to colonel general, general of the army, or field marshal in other nations

When the Marshal of the Soviet Union was introduced later in 1935, it became the highest rank in the Red Army, extending an already complex rank system.

However, when personal General ranks were introduced in 1940, the updated rank system did not feature a Brigadier-grade rank, mirroring a situation in the Russian Imperial Russian army where the Brigadier rank ceased to exist in the early 19th century. Most of the officers holding the kombrig rank were demoted to Colonels, and only a few were promoted to major general.

Another peculiarity of this new system was the absence of a full General rank, which until the 19th century was called General-en-Chef in the Russian Imperial army, and then was renamed General of the Infantry, Cavalry and Artillery. Curiously, the initial draft of the new rank system submitted by People's Commissar of Defence Marshal Voroshilov was more in line with Russian military tradition. In a memorandum submitted on 17 March 1940 to the Politburo and Sovnarkom, Voroshilov made the following proposal:

After discussing this question with my deputies, we conclude that our army needs to have the same number of General ranks as it was in the Tsarist army and as it exists in other European armies such as German, French and British. At present we have five General-grade ranks (kombrig, komdiv, komcor, komandarm 2nd rank, and komandarm 1st rank). We find it necessary to join the military ranks of komdiv and komcor into a single Lieutenant General rank, and to similarly join the military ranks of komandarm 2nd rank and komandarm 1st rank into a single rank of General of the Infantry (artillery, cavalry, aviation, armored troops, etc.). To follow [them] is the highest military rank in the Red Army, the Marshal of the Soviet Union, which corresponds to similar ranks in foreign capitalist armies. We believe there is no need for additional military ranks above Marshal.

However, in the final document, the two komandarm ranks were replaced with Colonel General and General of the Army, with the rank of Marshal of the Soviet Union on top of them. In the end, the number of General-grade ranks did not reduce at all even with the abolition of the Brigadier-grade kombrig rank, contrary to the initial proposal by Voroshilov.

After the introduction of this new system, most existing kombrigs were ranked as colonel, although some were ranked as general; existing komdivs were mostly ranked as major general, komcors and Army Commanders 2nd rank was mostly ranked Lieutenant General, and Army Commanders 1st rank were ranked as Colonel General or General of the Army (a notable exception is Georgy Zhukov who was promoted to General of the Army directly from komcor rank). Later in 1943, the ranks of Chief Marshal of the branch and Marshal of the branch were introduced in aviation, artillery, communications troops, and armored troops; Chief Marshal equivalents to Marshal of the Soviet Union, Marshal equivalents to General of the Army.

The final personal rank structure (for the Army and the Air Force) was thus as follows:

- Colonel – brigade or division level
- Major general – corps, division, or (rarely) brigade level
- Lieutenant general – corps or army level
- Colonel general – army or front level
- General of the Army or Marshal (in 1943) – army and front level, or service branch and Army level
- Marshal of the Soviet Union or Chief Marshal (in 1943) – front and supreme command level reserved for most honored field commanders or service branch and Army level
- Generalissimo of the Soviet Union - Reserved for Joseph Stalin

Eventually, the Soviet system of general ranks included commonplace colonel, major general, lieutenant general, but the rank between lieutenant general (equivalent of two-star major general) and General of the Army (equivalent of four-star full general) was occupied by colonel general, which in the Soviet system is the equivalent of three-star lieutenant general in other nations. Marshal of the Soviet Union is the equivalent of five-star field marshal or General of the Army.

This unusual rank structure makes rank comparisons difficult; Marshal of the Soviet Union is arguably not the equivalent to NATO five-star general ranks such as British field marshal or American General of the Army, but is instead an honorary rank analogous to the Marshal of France, although without associated state functions.

In the Soviet Navy before 1935 the ranks were personal positions. Since that year the general officer rank structure became as follows:

- Flag officer 2nd rank (rear admiral lower half)
- Flag officer 1st rank (rear admiral upper half)
- Fleet flag officer 2nd rank (vice admiral)
- Fleet flag officer 1st rank (full admiral)

From 1940, the rank structure for high officers of the Navy became:

- Captain 1st rank (captain)
- Counter admiral (rear admiral lower half)
- Vice admiral (rear admiral upper half)
- Admiral (vice admiral)
- Admiral of the fleet (full admiral)

In 1943, the rank structure slightly changed into the final rank formation which remained until the dissolution of the Navy in 1991 with more changes in 1955 and 1962:

- Captain 1st rank (captain)
- Counter admiral (rear admiral lower half)
- Vice admiral (rear admiral upper half)
- Admiral (vice admiral)
- Admiral of the fleet (full admiral) (became Admiral of the Fleet of the Soviet Union in 1955, an equivalent rank to a marshal of the Soviet Union, but reinstated in 1962 as the junior rank of admiral of the fleet, equivalent to full admiral and full general too)

Ranks in the shore services mirrored the changes in the Red Army save that colonel-general became the highest rank for troops in those services.

The Russian Navy still uses this, except that Marshal of the Russian Federation is the highest rank of precedence, and the rank below that, Admiral of the Fleet, is the highest deck rank for officers.

== Corps color ==
From 1919 to 1922, colour of collar patch indicating the corps:

- Crimson: infantry
- Blue: cavalry
- Orange: artillery
- Black: engineers
- Light blue: air force
- Green: border guard

From 1922 to 1923, the rank insignia have four colours:

- Colour of collar patch
- Colour of collar patch's edge
- Colour of numbers and letters on collar patch
- Colour of trouser stripes indicating the corps.
- Crimson collar patch with black edge gold numbers and letters and crimson trouser stripe: infantry and all troops services.
- Blue collar patch with black edge gold numbers and letters and blue trouser stripe: cavalry.
- Black collar patch with red edge gold numbers and letters and red trouser stripe: artillery.
- Light blue collar patch with black edge gold numbers and letters and light blue trouser stripe: air force.
- Red collar patch with black edge yellow letters and red trouser stripe: armoured troops.
- Black collar patch with red edge silver numbers and letters and red trouser stripe: engineers.
- Black collar patch with yellow edge silver numbers and letters and yellow trouser stripe: signals.

From 1924 to 1934, the rank insignia have two colours. The colour of collar patch and the colour of collar patch's edge indicating the corps:

- Crimson with black edge: infantry and all troops services
- Blue with black edge: cavalry
- Black with bright red edge: artillery, armoured troops
- Light blue with black edge: air force
- Black with blue edge: technical corps (radio communications, engineers, chemicals, technical military schools, road construction, pipeline units, building and airbase construction, military topography service)
- Dark green with bright red edge: medical and veterinary services, administrative service, judge advocates

From 1935 to 1942, the rank insignia have two colours. The colour of collar patch and colour of collar patch's edge indicating the corps:

- Crimson with black edge: infantry and all troops services
- Blue with black edge: cavalry
- Black with bright red edge: artillery
- Velvet black with bright red edge: armored troops
- Light blue with black edge: air force
- Black with blue edge: technical corps
- Black with black edge: chemicals corps
- Dark green with bright red edge: medical and veterinary services, administrative service

From 1943 to 1955, the rank insignia have two colours. Colour of shoulder board and edge colour indicating the corps:

- Crimson with black edge: infantry, mechanized and motorized infantry
- Blue with black edge: cavalry
- Black with bright red edge: artillery, armored troops
- Light blue with black edge: air force, airborne troops, air technical services
- Black with black edge: technical corps
- Dark green with bright red edge: medical and veterinary services

From December 1955 to 1970, the colours were changed to:

- Crimson: infantry, mechanized and motorized infantry, airborne troops
- Black: artillery, armoured troops, technical corps
- Light blue: air force
- Dark green: medical and veterinary services
- Red: high officers (all branches)

From 1970 to 1991(93):

- Red: infantry, military educational institutions
- Light blue: Air Force, airborne troops, air technical services
- Black: artillery, armoured troops, technical corps and navy

In March 1956, general officers' stars were changed to gold.

=== Letter codes ===
The shoulder insignia of a private in the Soviet Army. The abbreviation CA identifies the Soviet Army and was present on the shoulders of most enlisted personnel. The crimson background represents regular land armed forces.

The letters worn on the shoulders since 1972 stand for:

- ВВ (Внутренние войска, Vnutrennie voiska) – Interior Ministry's troops
- К (Курсант, Kursant) – Higher military college student taking military courses (hence kursant), equivalent to cadet
- ГБ (Государственная безопастность, Gosudarstven'naya bezopastnost' ) – State Security
- ПВ (Пограничные войска, Pogranichnye voiska) – Border Troops
- СА (Советская Армия, Sovietskaya Armiya) – Soviet Army
- ВС (Вооружённые Силы, Vooruzhennie Sily) – Armed Forces (Soviet Army, late USSR to modern Russia)
- СШ (специальная школа, spetsialnaya shkola) – Special school
- Ф (Флот, Flot) – Navy
  - СФ (Северный флот, Severnyi flot) – Northern Fleet
  - ЧФ (Черноморский флот, Chernomorskiy flot) – Black Sea Fleet
  - КФ (Каспийский флот, Kaspiyskiy flot) – Caspian Sea fleet
  - БФ (Балтийский флот, Baltiyskiy flot) – Baltic fleet
  - ТФ (Тихоокеанский флот, Tikhookeanskiy flot) – Pacific Fleet
- СВУ (Суворовец, Suvorovets) – Suvorov School student, an Army cadet
- ВМУ (Военно-музыкальное Училище Voyenno-muzikalnoye Uchilishche) – Military Music School student, a Marching Band cadet
- H (Нахимовец, Nakhimovets) – Nakhimov School student, a Navy cadet

== Unofficial grade system and military culture in the Soviet Army ==
Besides the official rank system in the armed forces, another system was developed and established within the military culture. The military culture of the Soviet Union was driven by a "seniors" (Russian: Дедовщина, Dedovshchina). The concept of "Dedovshchina" usually pertains to soldiers in their first two-year obligatory tour in the armed forces, particularly in the Army.

1. Ghost, Warrior (first year), other names are a goose, rabbit, small elephant, etc.
2. Elephant, Warrior (6 months to a year), other names are a grand goose, senior rabbit, etc.
3. Scull, Candidate (first year), other names are ladle, first year, pheasant, etc.
4. Grandfather (a year and a half)
5. Dembel, Grandfather on orders (at demobilization)

== Influence on rank systems in other countries ==
The Soviet ranks and insignia (post-1943) are based on the ranks of Imperial Russia, which influenced the rank systems in imperial Japan, Thailand, Greece, Serbia, and Bulgaria. While the first three later took their course of development, the Bulgarians remain under the influence of the Russian and the (post-)Soviet tradition until recently.

The rank systems in the pro-Soviet states of Mongolia and Tuva developed under the Soviet influence, following the pattern change in 1943.

The Soviet influence on the rank and insignia of other countries reached the apex after WW2 when most countries of Eastern Europe changed their traditional insignia to the Soviet design. Yugoslavia abandoned the Soviet-style insignia in 1951, following the breakaway from Stalin's block, adopting a unique rank insignia design; other countries quickly reverted to previous designs shortly after Stalin's death (1956–1958). Only Poland and East Germany kept the pre-war uniform and rank insignia and only modified it to fit with the Soviet rank structure. Albania kept the Soviet-based system until 1966 when ranks and insignia were abolished completely until 1991 where a new design was implemented. Bulgaria kept the Soviet-style ranks until 1991.

Outside the Warsaw Alliance, the Soviet system of ranks and insignia influenced those in the following countries: China (before 1958 and after 1988), East Turkestan (unrecognized, part of China), North Korea, Vietnam (with stripes horizontal rather than vertical), Laos (senior officers have a thick stripe instead of two thin stripes), Kampuchea (1979–1993), Afghanistan (senior officers have horizontal stripes instead of vertical), South Yemen (1985–1990), Mongolia, and Cuba (the latter two countries slightly changed designs in the post-Soviet times, but the Soviet patterns are still easy to recognize). In Africa, pro-Soviet regimes in Burkina Faso (under Thomas Sankara), Angola, and Mozambique (under Samora Machel) used Soviet-style insignia but abandoned them when political trends changed. Currently, Congo, Ethiopia, and Eritrea still retain the Soviet-based system of ranks with slightly changed designs (officers have horizontal stripes rather than vertical).

Post-Soviet countries mostly retained the Soviet-based system of ranks and insignia, except for the Baltic States (they restored their pre-Soviet rank systems), Azerbaijan (which wanted to make its uniforms and ranks prominently different from Armenian), Georgia, and Ukraine (Soviet-style designs were used before 2003 and 2016 in both Georgia and Ukraine respectively).

== See also ==
- Army ranks and insignia of the Russian Federation
- Air Force ranks and insignia of the Russian Federation
- Naval ranks and insignia of the Russian Federation
- History of Russian military ranks
- Military ranks of Ukraine
