= Komandarm =

Soviet military rank

Army commander командующий армией
- Insignia used 1918–1935
- Country: Soviet Union
- Service branch: Red Army
- Abbreviation: Komandarm
- Formation: 1918
- Abolished: 1940
- Next higher rank: Front commander (1918–1935); Marshal of the Soviet Union (1935–1940)
- Next lower rank: Corps commander

Komandarm is the abbreviation of the Russian: командующий армией, romanized: komanduyushtchi armiy, lit. 'commander of the army / army commander', and was a military rank used in the Soviet Union. Between 1918 and 1935, it was a rank in the Red Army, roughly equivalent to Flotilla commander in the Red Fleet. The rank insignia were three diamonds. The Komandarm rank name reflected Soviet practice of naming the rank after the unit commanded, rather than traditional officer ranks, which were thought to be out of line with revolutionary ideals. The use of such ranks was abolished and traditional rank names reintroduced in 1935. At the same time the komandarm rank was split into the first and second grade and the highest rank of Marshal of the Soviet Union was introduced. Second rank komandarms wore four diamonds and those of the first rank wore four diamonds and a star. In 1940, the rank was abolished and general rank titles, such as the equivalent ranks of army general and colonel general introduced.

== Split ==
In 1935, new ranks were introduced, splitting the Komandarm rank into two ranks.

Designation		Higher commanders
Rank insignia	Coat-collar
Rank insignia	Gymnastjorka
Rank insignia	Sleeve chevron
Russian		Командарм 1-го ранга Komandarm 1-go ranga	Командарм 2-го ранга Komandarm 2-go ranga
English		Army commander 1st class	Army commander 2nd class
Rank designation after 1940		Army general (Chief marshal of the branch & Marshal of the branch)

== See also ==
- Ranks and insignia of the Red Army and Navy 1918–1935
- Ranks and insignia of the Red Army and Navy 1935–1940
