= Military ranks and insignia of the Soviet Union (1918–1935) =

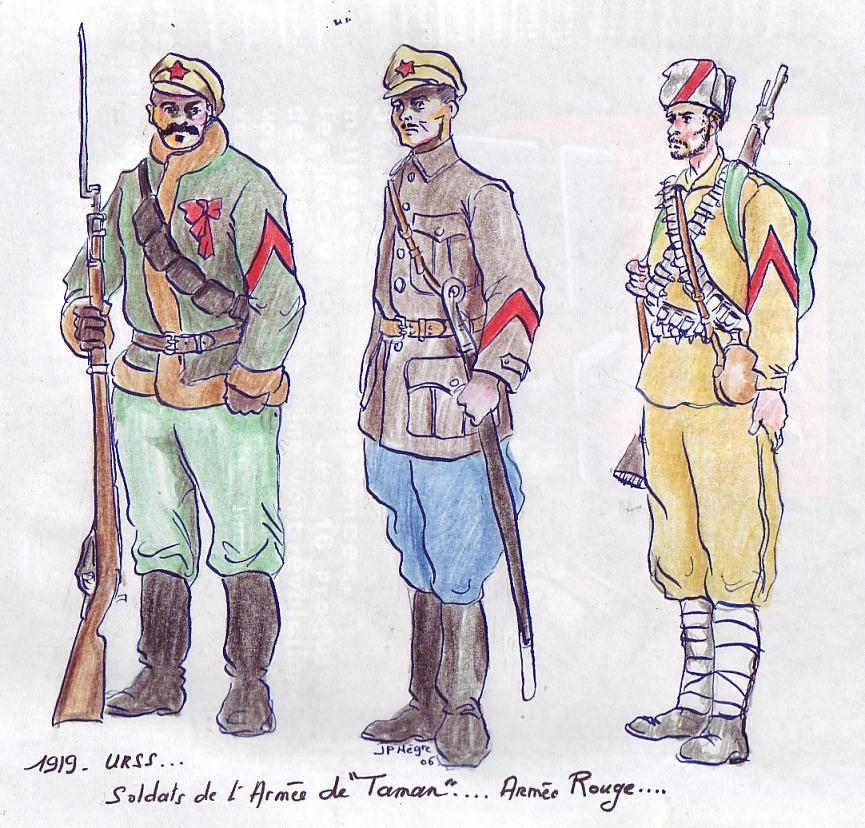
1. Soldiers of the Army of Taman, note the ribbon and red cap insignia that were typical of the Red Guards and early Red Army as well as the large red chevron that commemorated the unit's breakout through enemy lines.

In the period from 1918 to 1935 of the young Soviet Union any "bourgeois" military ideas were put under general suspicion by the communists, the new political establishment. Amongst other things, this led to the old tsarist ranks being replaced with a new tradition of rank designations and insignia for the new Red Army and the nascent Soviet Navy.

== Origins and the Red Guards ==
=== The Red Guards ===
The beginnings of the Red Army and its early departure from Tsarist tradition can be seen in the Red Guards that preceded it in 1917. These armed bands, primary composed of factory workers and other 'proletarians', were a wholly volunteer force where commanders were elected during militia meetings. After their creation following the February Revolution, they began to wear cloth red stars and diagonal (top right to bottom left) red strips on caps, and red ribbons alongside red cloth armbands however the extent to which any of these were worn varied. Some armbands would have writing displaying date of formation, locality or factory of origin of the unit, detachment number and/or simply the words Red Guard whilst others could have designs (an example being a depiction of Saint George from Moscow) or badges (such as the militia shield badge introduced after November).

=== The inception of the Red armed forces and its initial insignia ===
On 8 November, the day after the October Revolution, the Committee on Military and Naval Affairs (later renamed to the Soviet of People's Commissars on Military and Naval Affairs) was formed with the goal of creating the new "People's Army" where the revolutionary ideals of equality and liberty were to be implemented. The army was officially created on 15 January 1918. The shoulder boards of the old regime and all tsarist insignia were previously abolished by the Provisional Government but were now replaced by Red Guard stars and diagonal strips on caps in the Red Army whilst a "profusion of red distinctions: cockade, cap band, and collar among others" were worn in the Red Navy.

The symbols of the new army weren't the only thing passed down from the Red Guards. The Red Army in its first few months of life was a volunteer force of no more than 200,000 men (by 20 April) who also elected their commanders. The levelling of military grades and neglecting of rank designation were symptomatic of this new, yet temporary, order. The first common rank designation throughout the Red Army was Red Army man (Russian: kрасноармеец, romanized: krasnoarmeyets) or, in the Workers' and Peasants' Red Navy, Red Fleet man (Russian: kраснофлотец, romanized: krasnoflotets). Personnel designated to command a military unit of any size were named "red commander" (Russian: красный командир, krasnyi komandir abbreviated краском; kraskom); the same day the army was created, a red cloth star on the left sleeve was introduced to identify such leaders. The first Soviet cadets graduated with the title of "platoon commander" (Russian: командир взвода, komandir vzvoda, abbreviated komvzvoda) but this was later changed to "red commander" for the sake of equal chances for progression amongst soldiers. Officially there were no officers in the Red Army and the distinction indicated a different post rather than a different rank, this superficial distinction was replaced once again with a system of ranks in 1935.

=== The colour red in Russia ===
For centuries red (Krasnaia in Russian) had been the colour of defiance and revolution but within Russia, it had its own meanings. Red had been a favoured colour of the Tsars, using it prominently in their architecture such as in the Red Square for example. Iconic buildings in Russia already sporting a revolutionary hue alongside Krasnaia also meaning beautiful gave the colour additional propaganda usage to the Bolsheviks. Despite these positive traits, for centuries a red flag on tall town buildings had a more sinister meaning - a plague outbreak; in the early days of the Civil War this led to White units taking a wide berth around Soviet controlled settlements. The Bolsheviks did persevere in the face of this negative connotation however and red became the de facto symbol of their brand of revolution.

=== Origins of the red star ===
There are a few stories of how the red star came to be the symbol of the Red armed forces, some more reputable than others. One credible story says that in 1917, members of the Moscow garrison were ordered to wear white tin stars on their caps to differentiate themselves from the mass influx of troops returning from the front against the Central Powers. When a revolutionary air came over them, the garrison painted these stars red with the Bolsheviks approving so much of the idea that it would become the official symbol of the Soviet military. Another less reputable story claims that the star was introduced by the large section of Jews in the young government and military who saw the Revolution as the in-progress building of the Promised Land in Russia. Either way, the official line from the Bolsheviks was that the star represented world revolution on the five continents. (Note: Presumably Europe, Africa, Asia, and the Americas.)

== The Civil War (1918–1922) ==
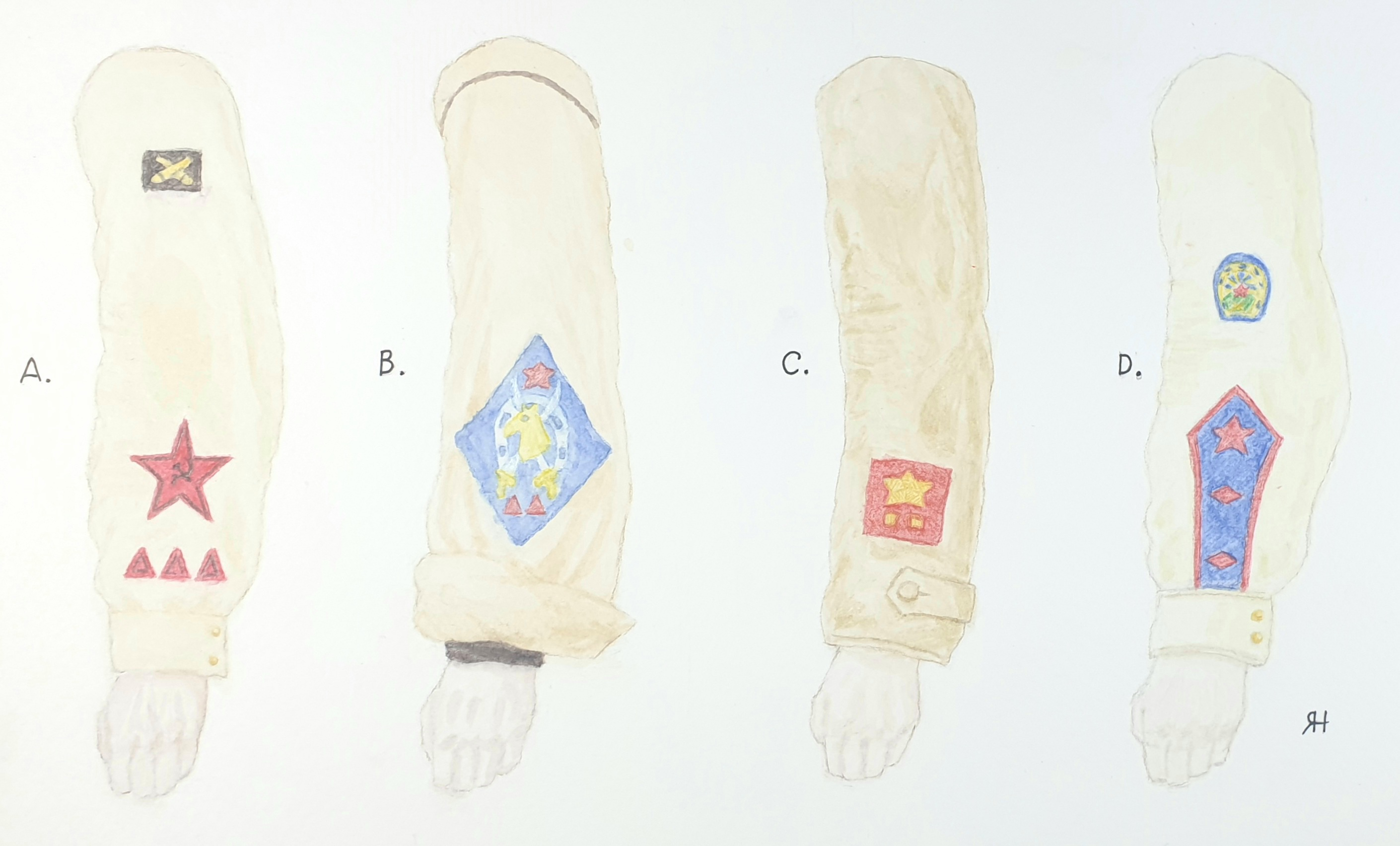
2. Examples of both official and unofficial Red Army rank and branch sleeve insignia 1919–1922.

In early 1918 it had become apparent that the new model of army was inadequate, both small in number and typically ineffectual in the face of the Germans and Anton Denikin's men. The election of commanders was abandoned and conscription for men ages 21 to 26 was introduced on 12 June. This new found professionalism along with the Soviets gradually growing control over administrative and manufacturing power lead to greater standardisation and the creation of new insignia in addition to a new rank structure in this period. (Note: The word professionalism is used loosely here as whilst the Red Army did strive to become a more regular and disciplined force, poor behaviour and appalling levels of desertion among other things were common.) One of the greatest weaknesses of the Reds during the Civil War were their ineffectual logistics: this meant that, combined with a lack of discipline surrounding uniform in many units, the introduction of new insignia would only be on paper for large portions of the army. Discipline around this was so absent in fact that it wasn't uncommon for commanders to wear their rank patches in varying designs and all kinds of imaginative arrangements before either the official arrangement was introduced or discipline improved.

=== 1918 ===
==== General Red Army Insignia ====
No longer content with Red Guard hand-me-downs, the Red Army adopted new insignia of their own. First the new emblem for the Red Army, the Revolutionary Military Symbol of the Red Army (a large enamel red star containing a brass hammer and plough device with an oak branch on the left side and a laurel on the right making a wreath surrounding the star), which was meant to be worn either as a cap badge or on the left breast (see table 1). Introduced in July 1918, it was initially meant to be worn only by commanders and military cadets but was soon adopted by all Red Army servicemen. Soon after, a dedicated cap badge (officially referred to as a cockade) was introduced bearing a semblance to the first but with wreath removed. At first two of the points were uppermost, before it was directed that a single point of the star should face the 12 o'clock position at the end of 1918. Besides the official badge designs, many unofficial variants of this cap badge were worn (more or less fitting the same description) with still others having to resort to the use of the gold stars from discarded officer's shoulder boards for their cap badges during the first years of the Civil War.

Chest badge & cap badges of the Red Army (1918–1922)

Revolutionary Military Symbol of the Red Army (in the centre of a silver wreath)

Red star cockade

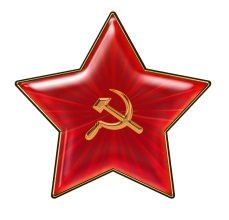
Cockade as of Order No. 953 (from April 13, 1922)

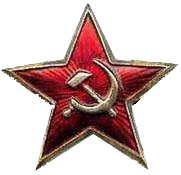
Cockade as of Order No. 1691 (from July 11, 1922)

==== Development of the future insignia of the Red Army ====
On 25 April 1918 by order of the Revolutionary Military Council of the Republic, a Commission on the Elaboration of Uniform was formed. A competition was to be prepared to find new designs for Red Army uniforms, rank insignia, and branch colours. The competition commenced on 7 May with many prominent designers and artists participating until at last on 18 December the Revolutionary Military Council had made its decision. On 29 November 1918, the All-Russian Central Executive Committee approved these proposals and agreed to these new rank designations being used by both the Red Guards and the Red Army.

Rank group	Red commanders (1919–1923)
Sleeve insignia
Russian	Командующий фронтом Komanduyushchiy frontom	Командующий армией Komanduyushchiy armiey	Командир корпуса Komandir korpusa	Начальник дивизии Nachal'nik divizii	Командир бригады Komandir brigady
English	Front commander	Army commander	Army corps commander	Division chief	Brigade commander

Rank group	Red commanders (1919–1923)
Sleeve insignia
Russian	Командир полка Komandir polka	Командир батальона Komandir batal'ona	Помощник командира батальона Pomoshchnik komadira batal'ona	Командир роты Komandir roty Командир эскадрона Komandir eskadrona	Помощник командира роты Pomoshchnik komandira roty Помощник командира эскадрона Pomoshchnik komandira eskadrona	Командир взвода Komandir vzvoda
English	Regiment commander	Battalion commander	Deputy battalion commander	Company commander Squadron commander	Deputy company commander Deputy squadron commander	Platoon leader

Rank group	Red Commanders (1919–1923)			Red Army Men
Sleeve Insignia
Russian	Старшина роты Starshina roty Старшина батареи Starshina batarei Старшина эскадрона Starshina eskadrona	Помощник командира взвода Pomoshchnik komandira vzvoda	Командир отделения Komandir otdeleniya	Красноармеец; Krasnoarmeyets
English	Company senior Battery senior Squadron senior (all equivalent to sergeant major)	Deputy platoon leader	Squad leader	Red Army man

=== 1919 ===
On 16 January 1919 the official adoption of the new uniforms and insignia was announced by the Revolutionary Military Council via Order No. 116.

Branch	Branch colour (1919–1923)
General Staff	Black piped crimson
Infantry	Crimson
Cavalry	Medium blue
Artillery	Orange (later black)
Engineers	Black
Armour (Engineers)	Black
Medical Service	Colour of branch
Air Service	Light blue
Border Guards	Dark green

== Naval ranks (1921–1924) ==
With the definite beginning of the rehabilitation of the Soviet Navy in 1923–24 came the introduction of rank appointments for ratings and officers of the Navy. These ranks, however, began to be used during the Civil War years and were sanctioned in 1921.

- Red Fleetman (original designation: Krasnoflotez)
- Boatswain/Starshina (Botsman/Starshina)
- Squad leader (Komandir otdeleniya – short: Komot/Otdeljonnyj komandir)
- Group commander (Komandir gruppy – short: Komgrup)
- Combatant Commander (Komandir boyevoy chast – Kombocha)
- Assistant Ship Commander (Pomoshchnik komandira korablya – Pomkomkor)
- Senior assistant ship commander (Starshy pomoshchnik komandira korablya – Stapomkomkor)
- Ship Commander (Komandir korablya – Komkor)
- Naval Battalion Commander (Komandir diviziona korabley – Komdivzkor)
- Naval Brigade commander (Komandir brigady korabley – Kombrikor)
- Naval Division chief (Nachalnik divisiy korabley – short: Nachdivkor)
- Chief of Naval Forces of the USSR (Nachalnik morskoi sily SSSR – Nachmorsi SSSR)

Uniform insignia followed the traditions of the Imperial Navy but with sleeve insignia for officers and all ratings, but the uniform itself remained the same as its Imperial Russian predecessors.

== Distinction insignia and ranks (1924–1935) ==
The following ranks were used by the Soviet military from 1924 to 1935. The new ranks came as a result of new People's Commisariat for Defense regulations concerning military ranks and appointments.

=== Army and air force ranks ===
==== High commanders ====
Rank group	High commanders and chiefs
Collar insignia
Service category	К-14	К-13	К-12	К-11	К-10
Russian	Командующий войсками фронта (округа); Komanduyushchiy voyskami fronta (okruga)	Командующий армией Komanduyushchiy armiyey	Командир корпуса Komandir korpusa	Командир дивизии Komandir divizii	Командир бригады Komandir brigady
English	Commander of the front (district) troops	Army commander	Corps commander	Divisional commander	Brigade commander

==== Senior and medium commanders ====
Rank group	Senior commanders and chefs			Medium commanders and chefs
Collar insignia
Service category	К-9	К-8	К-7	К-6	К-5	К-4	К-3
Russian	Командир полка Komandir polka	Помощник командира полка Pomoshchnik komandira polka	Командир батальона Komandir batal'ona	Помощник командира батальона Pomoshchnik komandira batal'ona	Командир роты Komandir roty	Помощник командира роты Pomoshchnik komandira roty	Командир взвода Komandir vzvoda
English	Regimental commander	Assistant regimental commander	Battalion commander	Assistant battalion commander	Company commander	Assistant company commander	Platoon commander

==== Junior commanders and enlisted men ====
Rank group	Junior commanders and chefs				Enlisted men
Collar insignia
Service category	К-2	К-2	К-1	К-1	-
Russian	Старшина роты (батареи); Starshina roty (batarei)	Помощник командира взвода Pomoshchnik komandira vzvoda	Командир отделения Komandir otdeleniya	Командир звена Komandir zvena / Помощник командира отделения Pomoshchnik komandira otdeleniya	Красноармеец; Krasnoarmeyets
English	Company (Battery) Senior (Equivalent to Sergeant Major)	Assistant platoon commander	Section commander	Squad leader / Assistant section commander	Red Army man

=== Navy ===
==== High commanders ====
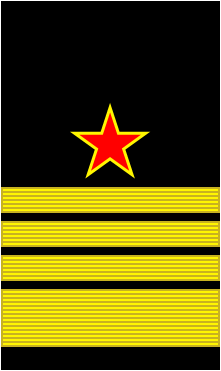
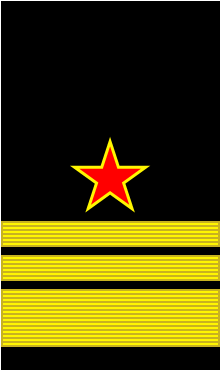
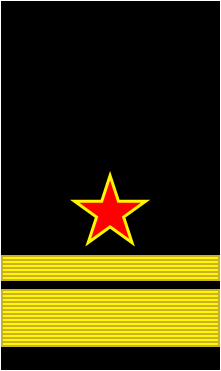
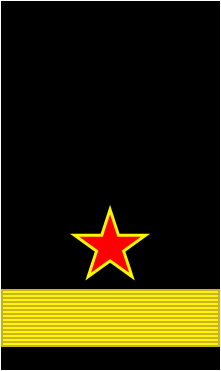
Rank group	High command level
Sleeve insignia
Service category	К-13	К-12	К-11	К-10
Russian	Командующий флотом Komanduyushchiy flotom	Командующий флотилией Komanduyushchiy flotiliyey	Командующий эскадрой Komanduyushchiy eskadroy	Командир бригады кораблей Komandir brigady korabley
English	Fleet commander	Flotilla commander	Squadron commander	Ship brigade commander

==== Senior and medium commanders ====
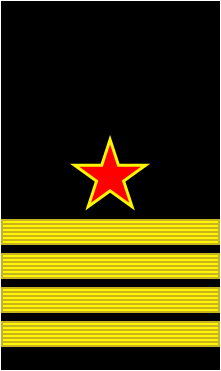
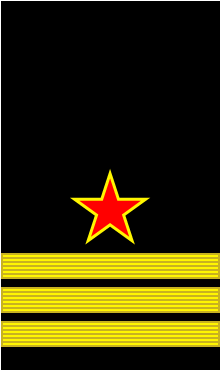
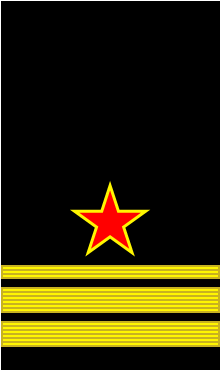
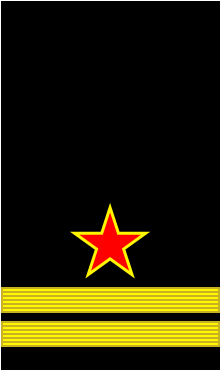
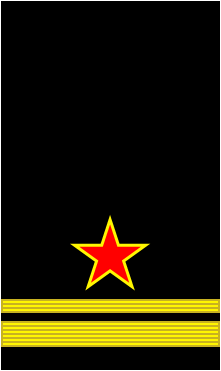
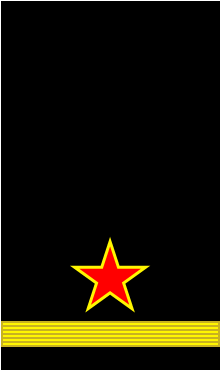
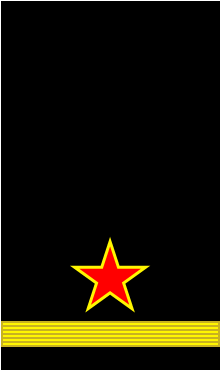
Rank group	Senior command level			Medium command level
Sleeve insignia
Service category	К-9	К-8	К-7	К-6	К-5	К-4	К-3
Russian	Командир корабля 1-го ранга Komandir korablya 1-go ranga	Старший помощник командира корабля 1-го ранга Starshiy pomoshchnik komandira korablya 1-go ranga	Командир корабля 2 ранга Komandir korablya 2 ranga	Командир корабля 3 ранга Komandir korablya 3 ranga / Старший помощник командира корабля 2 ранга Starshiy pomoshchnik komandira korablya 2 ranga	Командир корабля 4 ранга Komandir korablya 4 ranga / Старший помощник командира корабля 3 ранга Starshiy pomoshchnik komandira korablya 3 ranga	Старший помощник командира корабля 4 ранга Starshiy pomoshchnik komandira korablya 4 ranga	Командир боевой части Komandir boyevoy chasti
English	Ship commander 1st grade	Senior assistant ship commander 1st grade	Ship commander 2nd grade	Ship commander 3rd grade / Senior assistant ship commander 2st grade	Ship commander 4th grade / Senior assistant ship commander 3st grade	Senior assistant ship commander 4th grade	Combat section commander

==== Low commanders and enlisted men ====
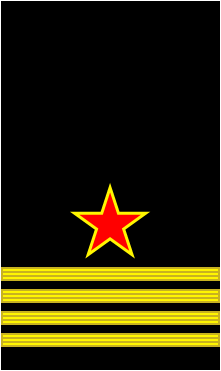
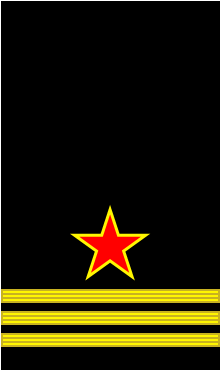
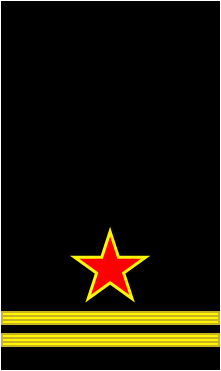
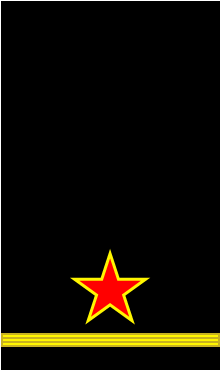
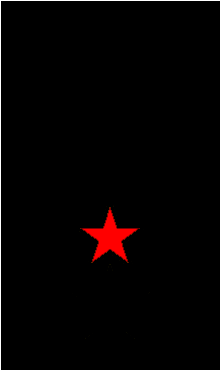
Rank group	Low command level				Enlisted men
Sleeve insignia
Service category	К-2	К-2	К-1	К-1	(0)
Russian	Старшина боевой части Starshina boyevoy chasti / Главный боцман Glavnyy botsman	Заместитель командира боевого поста Zamestitel' komandira boevogo posta / Старший боцман Starshiy botsman	Командир отделения Komandir otdeleniya / Боцман; Botsman	Командир группы Komandir gruppy / Помощник командира отделения Pomoshchnik komandira otdeleniya	Краснофлотец; Krasnoflotets
English	Chief of the combat section / Chief boatswain	Assistant combat station commander / Senior boatswain	Section commander / Boatswain	Group leader / Assistant section commander	Red Navy man

The rank of Marshal of the Soviet Union, created in September 1935, took first precedence over all ranks since then. With the new Marshal rank being introduced, the Council of People's Commissars began the process of phrasing out the 1924 rank system.

== See also ==
- History of Russian military ranks
- Ranks and insignia of the Imperial Russian Armed Forces
- Ranks and insignia of the White Movement
- Military ranks of the Soviet Union (1935–1940)
- Military ranks of the Soviet Union (1940–1943)
- Military ranks of the Soviet Union (1943–1955)
- Military ranks of the Soviet Union (1955–1991)
- Ranks and rank insignia of the Russian Federation's armed forces 1994–2010
- Army ranks and insignia of the Russian Federation
- Naval ranks and insignia of the Russian Federation
