= Komandarm 1st rank =

Red Army military rank

Army commander 1st class командующий армией 1-го ранга
- Coat-collar insignia
- Country: Soviet Union
- Service branch: Red Army
- Abbreviation: Komandarm 1st rank
- Formation: 1935
- Abolished: 1940
- Next higher rank: Marshal of the Soviet Union
- Next lower rank: Komandarm 2nd rank
- Equivalent ranks: Fleet flag officer 1st rank

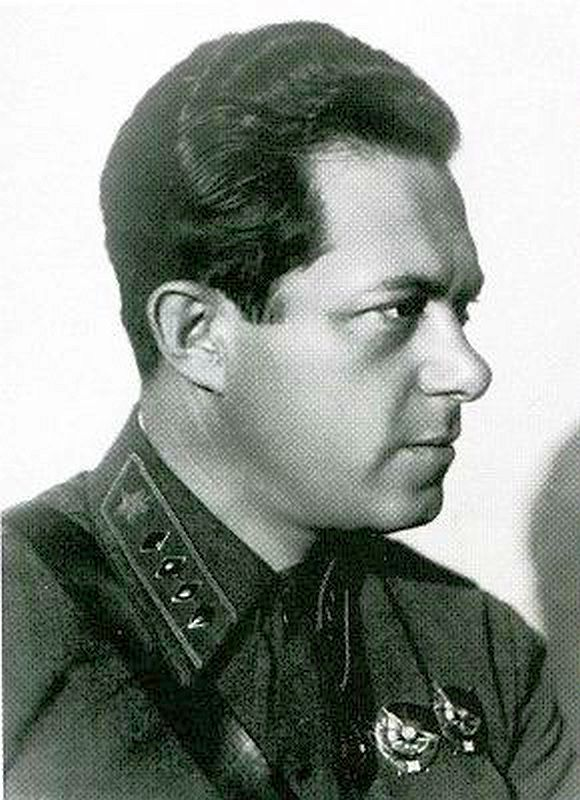
Komandarm 1st rank, collar insignia

Komandarm 1st rank (Russian: командарм 1-го ранга) is the abbreviation to commanding officer of the army 1st class (Russian: командующий армией 1-го ранга, romanized: komanduyushchiy armiyey 1-go ranga; lit. 'commander of the army / army commander 1st rank'), and was a military rank in the Soviet Armed Forces of the USSR in the period from 1935 to 1940. It was also the designation to military personnel appointed to command an army group or front sized formation (XXXXX).

Until 1940 it was the second highest military rank of the Red Army. It was equivalent to Komissar army 1st rank (ru: армейский комиссар 1-ого ранга) of the political staff in all military branches, Fleet Flag Officer 1st rank (ru: флагман флота 1-ого ранга) in the Soviet navy, or to Komissar of state security 1st rank (ru: комиссар государственной безопасности 1-ого ранга). With the reintroduction of regular general ranks, the designation Komandarm 1st rank was abolished, and replaced by General of the Army (OF-9).

== History ==
By foundation of the Soviet Union the rank designation and rank insignia of the Imperial Russian Army suppressed. However, an alternative rank structure was introduced by disposal of the Central Executive Committee of the Soviet Union and the Council of People's Commissars, from September 22, 1935.

The new rank structure was as follows:

- Command level Brigade X: Kombrig (Brigadier)
- Command level Division XX: Komdiv (Division commander)
- Command level Corps XXX: Komkor (Korps commander)
- Command level Field army XXXX: Komandarm 2nd rank (Army commander 2nd rank – Commander Army)
- Command level Army group, Front XXXXX: Komandarm 1st rank (Army commander 1st rank – Front commander)
- Marshal of the Soviet Union

By appointment of Kulik, Timoschenko and Schaposchnikov to Marshal of the Soviet Union (May 7, 1940) the above-mentioned individual ran structure was abolished and replaced by the new rank designation traditional Russian general's rank designations.

The rank Komandarm 1st rank was converted to General of the Army, the equivalent general's rank (OF-9).

However, the old distinction insignia had been worn until reintroduction of shoulder boards in 1943. Especially the collar insignia had to be worn out, and were finally replaced by the introduction of gorged embroidery for general officers.

== Rank insignia ==
Overcoat collar patch (big)

Jacket collar patch and Gymnastyorka

Chevron/ sleeve insignia

== Appointment ==
=== 1935 ===
Appointment to Komandarm 1st rank as to the disposal of the Central Executive Committee of the Soviet Union and the Council of People's Commissars (CPC) from November 11, 1935:

- Kamenev, Sergey Sergeyevich (1881–1936)
- Yakir, Iona Emmanuilovich (1896–1937)
- Uborevičius, Jeronimas (1896–1937)
- Belov, Ivan Panvilovich (1893–1938)
- Schaposchnikow, Boris Mikhailovitch (1882–1945)

=== 1938 ===
- Fedko, Ivan Fyodorovich (1897–1939); as to CPC disposal February 20, 1938
- Frinovsky, Mikhail Petrovich (1898–1940); as to CPC disposal September 14, 1938

=== 1939 ===
Appointments as to CPC disposal February 8, 1939:

- Kulik, Grigory Ivanovich (1890–1950)
- Timoshenko, Semyon Konstantinovich (1895–1970)

== See also ==
- Ranks and rank insignia of the Red Army 1935–1940, and ... 1940–1943
