= Military ranks of the Soviet Union (1935–1940) =

Individual rank insignia to the (Army) ground forces and (Navy) naval forces (1935–1940) were established by orders 2590 and 2591, effective from September 22, 1935.

This was mainly directed to supreme commanders, commanding officers, and personnel in charge to exert command and control in the Workers' and Peasants' Red Army, published by order number 176 of the USSR People's Commissariat of Defense, dated from December 3, 1935.

== Situation in 1935 ==
According to these new orders, new insignia of command personnel should indicate:

- Branch of service (e.g. Army, Air Force, or Navy), or special troops
- Qualification, professional responsibility, specific knowledge
- Rank insignia, operational/ tactical responsibility, e.g. level of military command, formation, unit, or sub-unit.

The top military rank of Marshal of the Soviet Union was created by order of the USSR Central Executive Committee and the “Council of People's Commissars” from September 22, 1935, onward, before the new ranks were issued.

== Military ranks ==
The military ranks created as a result of the joint decision of the “USSR Central Executive Committee” and the “Council of People's Commissars” from November 21, 1935, are contained in the table below. These replaced the ranks used from 1924.

Land forces Air Force	Naval forces	equivalent in GUGB/NKVD
Enlisted men & junior leading staff
Red Army Man	Red Fleet Man (from 1943: Matros)	No equivalent
Otdeljonnyi komandir		No equivalent
Junior commander	No equivalent	No equivalent
Starshina		No equivalent
Commanding staff
Lieutenant		Sergeant of the state security
Starshy leytenant		Mladshy leytenant of state security
Kapitan	Captain lieutenant	Lieutenant of state security
Major	Captain 3rd rank	Starshy leytenant of state security
Polkovnik	Kapitan 2nd rank	Kapitan of state security
Kombrig	Kapitan 1st rank	Mayor of state security
Komdiv	Flag officer 2nd rank	Starshy mayor of state security
Komkor	Flag Officer 1st rank	Commissioner of state security 3rd rank
Komandarm 2nd rank	Fleet Flag Officer 2nd rank	Commissioner of state security 2nd rank
Komandarm 1st rank	Fleet Flag Officer 1st rank	Commissioner of state security 1st rank
Marshal of the Soviet Union	No equivalent	State Security Commissioner general

=== Additional regulations ===
The same orders mentioned above provided for separate ranks for the Political commissars and military specialists, as in the table below.

Military-political staff all service branches	Military-technician staff		Military-administration and support all service branches	Military-medical service all service branches	Military-veterinarian all service branches	Military-legal service all service branches
Military-political staff all service branches	Land forces & Air Force	Naval forces	Military-administration and support all service branches	Military-medical service all service branches	Military-veterinarian all service branches	Military-legal service all service branches
No rank established	Military technician 2nd rank		Technical intendant 2nd rank	Army-surgeon	Veterinarian army-surgeon	Junior military jurist
Political leader	Military technician 1st rank		Technical-intendant 1st rank	Senior army-surgeon	Senior veterinarian army-surgeon	Military jurist
Senior political leader	Military engineer 3rd rank		Intendant 3rd rank	Military physician 3rd rank	Military veterinarian 3rd rank	Military jurist 3rd rank
Battalion commissar	Military engineer 2nd rank		Intendant 2nd rank	Mil-physician 2nd rank	Mil-vet-physician 2nd rank	Military jurist 2nd rank
Regimental commissar	Military engineer 1st rank		Intendant 1st rank	Military physician 1st rank	Mil-vet-physician 1st rank	Military jurist 1st rank
Brigade commissar	Brigade engineer	Engineer Flag officer 3rd rank	Brig-intendant	Brig-physician	Brig-vet-physician	Brig-mil-jurist
Division commissar	Division engineer	Engineer Flag officer 2nd rank	Div-intendant	Div-physician	Div-vet-physician	Div-mil-jurist
Corps commissar	Corps engineer	Engineer Flag officer 1st rank	Corps intendant	Corps physician	Corps vet-physician	Corps military-jurist
Army commissar 2nd rank	Army engineer	Fleet Engineer Flag officer	Army intendant	Army physician	Army veterinarian	Army military-jurist
Army commissar 1st rank	No equivalent ranks created					

== 1937 ==
More regulations were established in 1937, following general instructions of the Red Army. According to paragraph 10 of this instruction, the following subdivision of personnel was made:

- Leading staff: Military officers and heads of departments, military administration and commissariat, medical service, veterinarian service, military legal service
- Commanding staff: Personnel with the ranks commander in chief and commander
- Junior commanding staff
- Enlisted men/ratings

Paragraph 14 of this instruction contained the individual ranks and rank designations according to the order of September 22, 1935, and thus officially sanctioned the additional established OF-1c ranks (Junior lieutenant and Junior military technician), taking effect on August 5, 1937.

== 1939 ==
By decision of the extraordinary session of the Supreme Soviet of the USSR (end of August until early September 1939) the law on universal compulsory service took effect, and the new OF4-ranks of Podpolkovnik and Battalion commissar were introduced as a result of the amendments to the rank regulations of 1935. An equivalent OF4-rank for the Soviet navy was not established, however.

== Rank designations ==
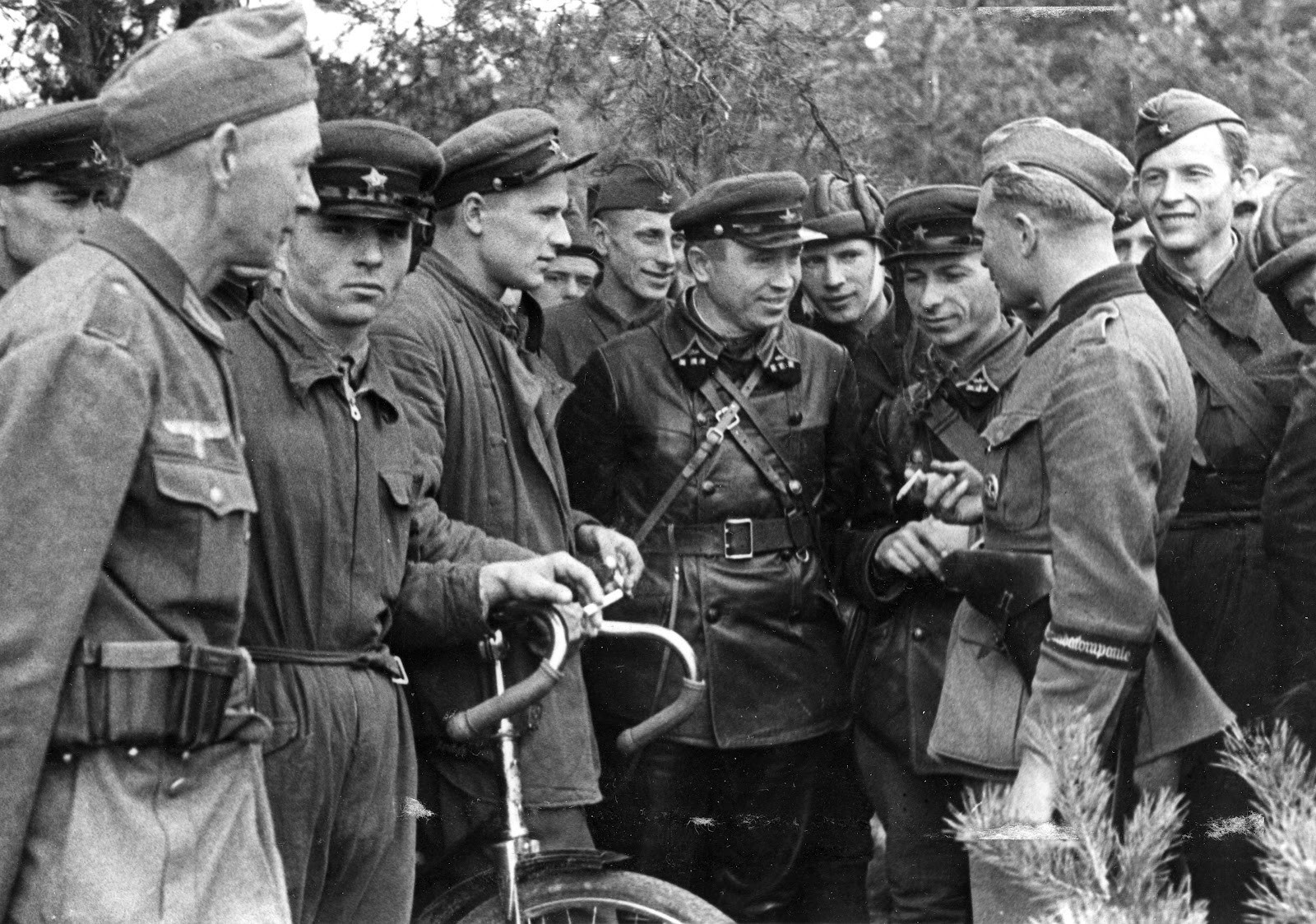
Soviet tankers with visible insignia of Starshy leytenant during the Nazi-Soviet joint military parade in Brest-Litovsk, Poland, on September 22, 1939.

In addition to individual ranks the establishment of defined rank insignia was made in December 1935 as well. From this time military staff, including political commissars, military administration, commissariat, medical service, veterinarian service, and military legal service of the Red Army wore rank insignia as follows:

- Rank insignia chevron: on both sleeves (short above the cuff)
- Rank insignia big: on both collar-edges of the uniform coat
- Rank insignia small: on both collar-edges of the battle jacket (Gymnastjorka)

However, naval military staff wore sleeve insignia (stripes and stars) on both sleeves of the uniform.

Commander in chief, higher commanding officers and top appointments OF10 to OF6

- Rank insignia, big (overcoat): on a rhombic padding, gold coloured border, one to four rhombic red enameled badges, gold coloured Soviet star small/ big
- Rank insignia, small (Gymnastjorka): on rectangle padding, gold coloured border, one to four rhombic red enameled badges
- Sleeve insignia (overcoat): one to four gold colored chevrons, Soviet star small/ big, one red coloured extra chevron OF10

Commanding officers and unit leaders OF5, OF3 and OF2

- Rank insignia big (over coat): on rhombic padding, gold coloured border, one to three red enameled rectangle badges
- Rank insignia small (Gymnastjorka): on rectangle padding, gold coloured border, one to four red enameled rectangle badges

Subunit leader OF1

- Rank insignia big (over coat): on rhombic padding, gold coloured border, one to four red enameled square badges
- Rank insignia small (Gymnastjorka): on rectangle padding, gold coloured border, one to four red enameled square badges

Sub-subunit leader and enlisted men OR8 to OR1

- Sub-subunit leader
  - Rank insignia big (over coat): on rhombic padding, gold coloured border, one to three red enameled triangular badges
  - Rank insignia small (Gymnastjorka): on rectangle padding, gold coloured border, one to four red enameled triangular badges
- Enlisted men: simple rank insignia big (over coat)/ simple rank insignia small (Gymnastjorka)

== Table of rank insignia land forces and Air Force 1935–1940 ==
=== Higher commanders ===
Designation		Higher commanders
Rank insignia	Coat-collar
Rank insignia	Gymnastjorka
Rank insignia	Sleeve chevron
Russian		Маршал советского союза Marshal sovetskogo soyuza	Командарм 1-го ранга Komandarm 1-go ranga	Командарм 2-го ранга Komandarm 2-go ranga	Комкор; Komkor	Комдив; Komdiv	Комбриг; Kombrig
English		Marshal of the Soviet Union	Army commander 1st class	Army commander 2nd class	Corps commander	Divisional commander	Brigade commander
Rank designation after 1940		Marshal of the Soviet Union (Chief marshal of the branch)	General of the Army (Marshal of the branch) and Marshal of the Soviet Union (Chief marshal of the branch)	Colonel general and General of the Army (Marshal of the branch)	Colonel general	Lieutenant general	Major General

=== Middle and senior commanders ===
Designation		Senior commanders			Middle-level commanders
Rank insignia	Coat-collar
Rank insignia	Gymnastjorka
Rank insignia	Sleeve chevron
Russian		Полковник; Polkovnik	Майор; Mayor	Капитан; Kapitan	Старший лейтенант Starshiy leytenant	Лейтенант; Leytenant	Младший лейтенант Mladshiy leytenant
English		Colonel	Major	Captain	Senior lieutenant	Lieutenant	Junior lieutenant (adopted 1937)

=== Junior commanders and enlisted men ===
Designation		Junior commanders			Enlisted men
Rank insignia	Coat-collar
Rank insignia	Gymastjorka
Russian		Старшина; Starshina	Младший комвзвод Mladshiy komvzvod	Отделенный командир Otdelennyy komandir	Красноармеец; Krasnoarmeyets
English		Starshina	Junior platoon commander	Section commander	Red Army man
Rank designation after 1940		No change	Senior sergeant	Sergeant	No change

== Table of rank insignia for the navy 1935–1940 ==
The following ranks and insignia were used by the Soviet Navy from 1935 to 1940.

=== Flag officers ===
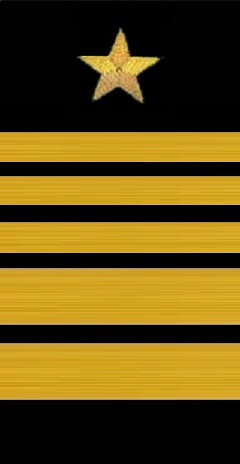
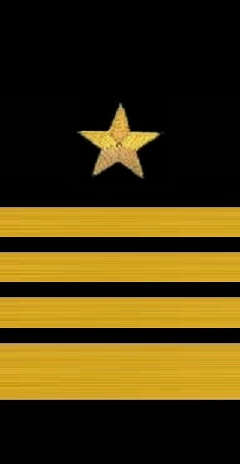
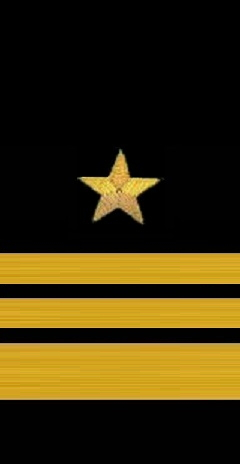
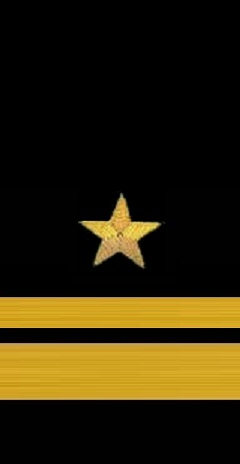
Designation	Commander in chief, higher commanders and top appointments
Sleeve insignia
Russian	Флагман флота 1-го ранга Flagman flota 1-go ranga	Флагман флота 2-го ранга Flagman flota 2-go ranga	Флагман 1-го ранга Flagman 1-go ranga	Флагман 2-го ранга Flagman 2-go ranga
English	Flag officer of the fleet 1st grade	Flag officer of the fleet 2nd grade	Flag officer 1st grade	Flag officer 2nd grade
Rank designation after 1940	Admiral of the Fleet	Admiral	Vice admiral	Counter admiral

=== Officers ===
Designation	Commanding officers and unit leaders
Sleeve insignia
Russian	Капитан 1-го ранга Kapitan 1-go ranga	Капитан 2-го ранга Kapitan 2-go ranga	Капитан 3-го ранга Kapitan 3-go ranga	Капитан-лейтенант; Kapitan-leytenant	Старший лейтенант Starshiy leytenant	Лейтенант; Leytenant	Младший лейтенант Mladshiy leytenant
English	Captain 1st grade	Captain 2nd grade	Captain 3rd grade	Captain lieutenant	Senior lieutenant	Lieutenant	Junior lieutenant (adopted 1937)

=== Sub-unit leader and enlisted men ===
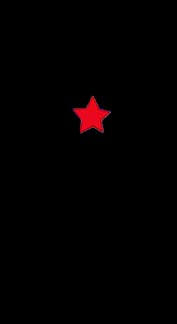
Designation	Sub-unit leaders, specialists & enlisted men
Sleeve insignia
Russian	Главный боцман Glavnyy botsman	Старшина; Starshina	Отделенный командир Otdelennyy komandir	Краснофлотец; Krasnoflotets
English	Chief Boatswain (adopted 1939)	Starshina	Squad commander	Red Navy man
Rank designation after 1940	Midshipman	Chief Petty Officer	Petty Officer 1st Class	No change

== See also ==
- History of Russian military ranks
- Ranks and insignia of the Imperial Russian Armed Forces
- Military ranks of the Soviet Union (1918–1935)
- Military ranks of the Soviet Union (1940–1943)
- Military ranks of the Soviet Union (1943–1955)
- Military ranks of the Soviet Union (1955–1991)
- Ranks and rank insignia of the Russian Federation's armed forces 1994–2010
