= Red Army man =

Soviet military rank

Red Army man красноармеец
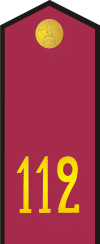
- Country: Soviet Union
- Service branch: Red Army
- Formation: 1918
- Abolished: July 1946
- Next higher rank: Section commander (1935–1940); Yefreytor (1940–1946)
- Equivalent ranks: Red Fleet man

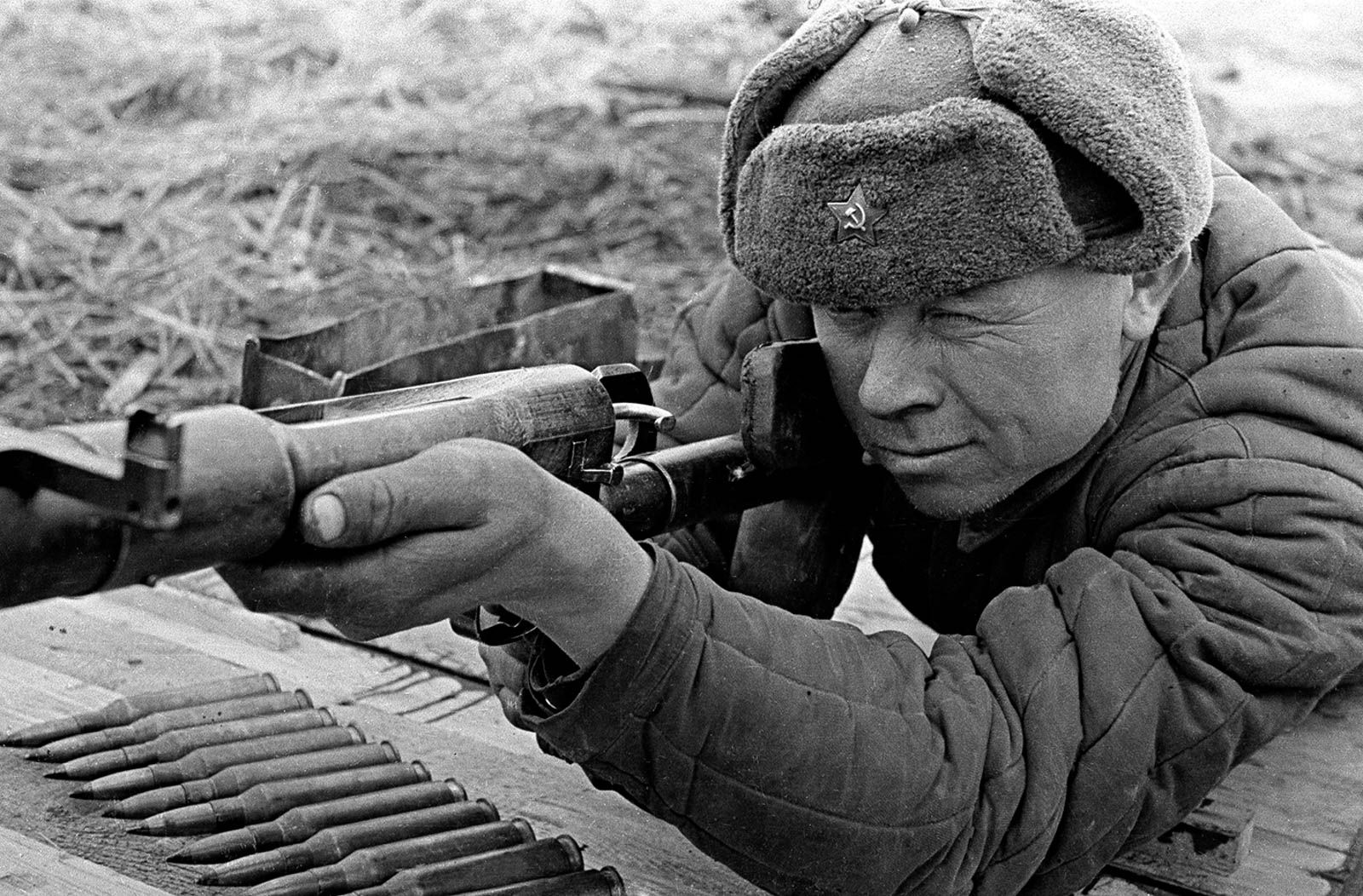
Krasnoarmeyets of the Kalinin Front with PTRD-41 anti-tank rifle, 1942.

Red Army man (Russian: Красноармеец, romanized: Krasnoarmeyets) was the lowest military rank in the Red Army of the Soviet Union from 1918 to 1946.

On 30 November 1917, after the October Revolution, the Military Revolutionary Committee cancelled all "officer and class ranks". Henceforth, the term Red Army man was used to refer to all ordinary soldiers.

It was replaced by the rank of Ryadovoy in July 1946.

Its naval equivalent was Red Fleet man.

== Additional insignia ==
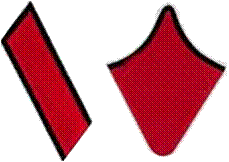
Infantry collar insignia

(1924–1935)

Cavalry collar insignia

(1924–1943)

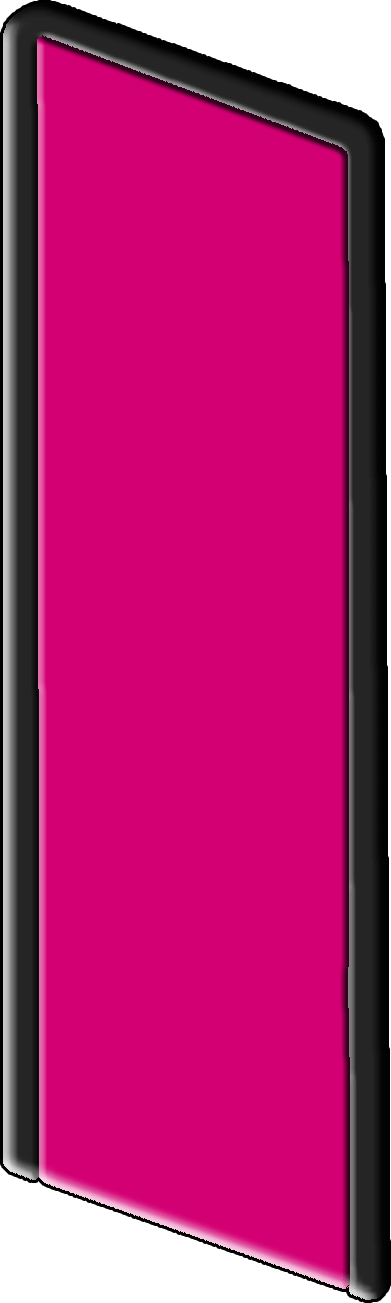
Infantry collar insignia

(1935–1940)

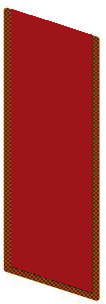
Infantry collar insignia

(1940–1943)

Air Force collar insignia

(1935–1940)

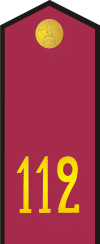
Infantry shoulder board

(1943–1946)

== See also ==
- Ranks and insignia of the Red Army and Navy 1918–1935
- Ranks and insignia of the Red Army and Navy 1935–1940
- Ranks and insignia of the Red Army and Navy 1940–1943
