= Kombrig =

Soviet Armed Forces military rank

Brigade commander командир бригады
- Coat-collar insignia
- Country: Soviet Union
- Service branch: Red Army
- Abbreviation: Kombrig
- Formation: 1935
- Abolished: 1940 (armed forces); 1943 (all branches)
- Next higher rank: Komdiv
- Next lower rank: Colonel
- Equivalent ranks: Captain 1st rank

Kombrig (Russian: комбриг) is an abbreviation of Commanding officer of the brigade (Russian: командир бригады, romanized: komandir brigady, lit. 'brigade commander'), and was a military rank in the Soviet Armed Forces of the USSR from 1935 to 1940. It was also the designation to military personnel appointed to command a brigade sized formation (X).

Until 1940 it was the fourth highest military rank of the Red Army. It was equivalent to Brigade commissar (Russian: бригадный комиссар, romanized: brigadny komissar) of the political staff in all military branches, Kapitan 1st rank (Russian: капита́н 1-го ранга, romanized: kapitan 1-go ranga) in the Soviet navy, or to Major of state security (Russian: майор государственной безопасности, romanized: mayor gosudarstvennoy bezolosnosti). With the reintroduction of regular general ranks, the designation Kombrig was abolished in the armed forces, however rank equivalents were still retained in some institutions like the Political staff, Engineering Corps, Judicial, Corps etc. Those rank equivalents were formally phased out with the introduction of the 1943 rank system. Contrary to popular belief, Kombrig didn't have any rank equivalent in the new soviet rank system. The new system only had 5 ranks instead of 6 due to the redirection of Brigade Command to Colonels. All members of the Supreme Command staff (Kombrig-Kamandarm 1st rank) had to go through a re certification, where individuals were given a rank based on their appointments, Only Komrbigs that held Command positions of a Division or higher were promoted to major generals while the rest were demoted to Colonels. Officially until 1943, People who held the rank equivalent of Kombrig in an auxiliary branch were placed between a Colonel and a Major General, acting as an eqvivalent to a british Brigadier.

== History ==
This particular rank was introduced by disposal of the Central Executive Committee of the Soviet Union and the Council of People's Commissars, from September 22, 1935. The new rank structure was as follows:

- Command level Brigade X: Kombrig (Brigadier)
- Command level Division XX: Komdiv (Division commander)
- Command level Corps XXX: Komkor (Korps commander)
- Command level Field army XXXX: Komandarm 2nd rank (Army commander 2nd rank – Commander Army)
- Command level Army group, Front XXXXX: Komandarm 1st rank (Army commander 1st rank – Front commander)
- Marshal of the Soviet Union

== Rank insignia ==
Overcoat collar patch (big)

Jacket collar patch and Gymnastyorka

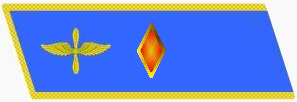
... Air Force

Chevron/ sleeve insignia

== See also ==
- Ranks and rank insignia of the Red Army 1935–1940, and ... 1940–1943
