= Nikolai Kashirin =

Soviet general (1888–1938)

Nikolai Dmitrievich Kashirin
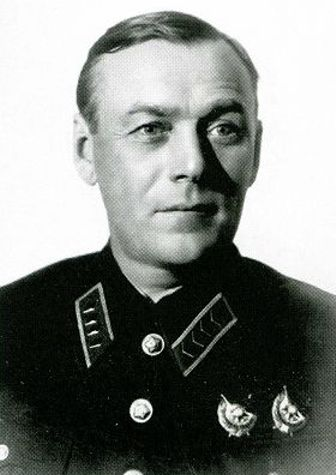
- Born: 16 February 1888; Verkhneuralsk, Orenburg Governorate, Russian Empire
- Died: 14 June 1938 (aged 50) Moscow, Soviet Union
- Allegiance: Russian Empire; Soviet Union
- Service years: 1906–1917 (Russian Empire); 1918–1937 (Soviet Union)
- Rank: Komandarm 2nd rank

Nikolai Dmitrievich Kashirin (Russian: Николай Дмитриевич Каширин; 16 February 1888 – 14 June 1938) was a Soviet Komandarm 2nd rank. He fought for the Imperial Russian Army in World War I, receiving the Order of Saint Vladimir and the Order of Saint Anna. He was a recipient of the Order of the Red Banner. He was one of the judges at the trial of Marshal of the Soviet Union Mikhail Tukhachevsky in the Case of Trotskyist Anti-Soviet Military Organization in June 1937. Kashirin was himself arrested on 19 August 1937 and later executed. His younger brother, Ivan, was arrested on 20/21 June 1937 and executed on 20 September 1937.

Preceded by Ivan Panfilovich Belov	Commander of the North Caucasus Military District; 1931–1937	Succeeded by Sergei Efimovich Gribov

== Bibliography ==
- Краснознамённый Киевский. Очерки истории Краснознамённого Киевского военного округа (1919–1979). Издание второе, исправленное и дополненное. Киев, издательство политической литературы Украины. 1979.
- Апрелков А.В. Командарм 2-го ранга Н.Д. Каширин//«Военно-исторический журнал», 1988, No. 2. - Стр.48-52.
