= Captain 1st rank =

Russian naval rank

Captain 1st rank (Russian: капитан 1-го ранга, romanized: kapitan pyervogo ranga, lit. 'captain of the 1st rank') is a rank used by the Russian Navy and a number of former communist states. The rank is the most senior rank in the staff officers' career group. The rank is equivalent to colonel in armies and air forces. Within NATO forces, the rank is rated as OF-5 and is equivalent to captain in English-speaking navies.

== Russia ==
Captain 1st rank Капитан 1-го ранга
- Uniform shoulder strap and sleeve (2013–present)
- Country: Russia
- Service branch: Russian Navy
- Rank group: Staff officer
- Formation: 1713
- Next higher rank: Counter admiral
- Next lower rank: Captain 2nd rank
- Equivalent ranks: Colonel

The rank was introduced in Russia by Peter the Great in 1713. By decision of the so-called Military Navy Commission (ru: Воинская морскaя комиссия) in 1732 the sequence of Kapitan ranks was abolished. However, until 1752 the grade rank Kapitan 1st rank was corresponding to Fleet kapitan (ru: флота капитан). Finally, the Kapitan ranks were reintroduced September 5 (16), 1751. The Red Army introduced the Kapitan 1st rank rank in 1935, together with a number of other former Russian ranks, and it continues to be used in many ex-USSR countries, including Russia.

The first OF-5 equivalent rank in the Soviet Navy (from 1918 to 1935) was Ship komandir 1st rank, also Ship commander 1st rank, (ru: командир корабля 1-ого ранга; literal: commander of the ship 1st rank).

This particular rank was introduced by disposal of the Central Executive Committee of the Soviet Union and the Council of People's Commissars, from September 22, 1935.

The equivalent rank designation in the Soviet Navy for warship engineers was Kapitan 1st rank-engineer. Other non-seagoing naval personnel of OF-5 rank, such as in medical service, chemical defence, marines, and naval aviation, have the rank of Polkovnik.

In the navy of the Russian Federation there are three ranks in the staff officer (until 1917: stab-ofizer, derived from German Stabsoffizier) career group:

- Captain 1st rank
- Captain 2nd rank
- Captain 3rd rank

Sequence of ranks in Russian Federation´s navy
junior rank: Captain 2nd rank	Captain 1st rank	senior rank: Kontr-admiral (OF-6)

=== Types of rank insignia Kapitan 1st rank and naval equivalents ===
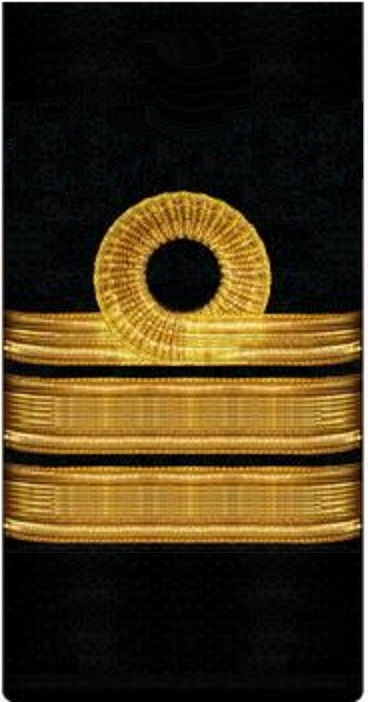
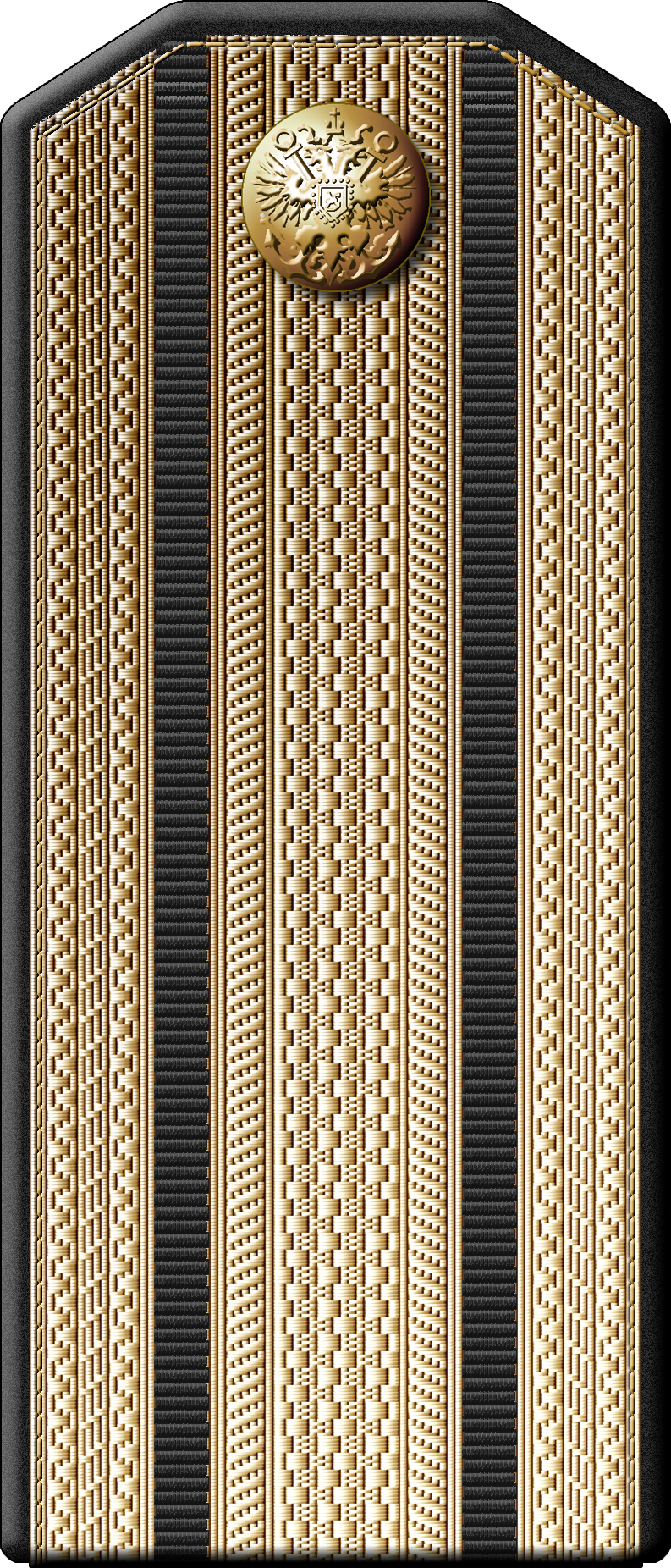
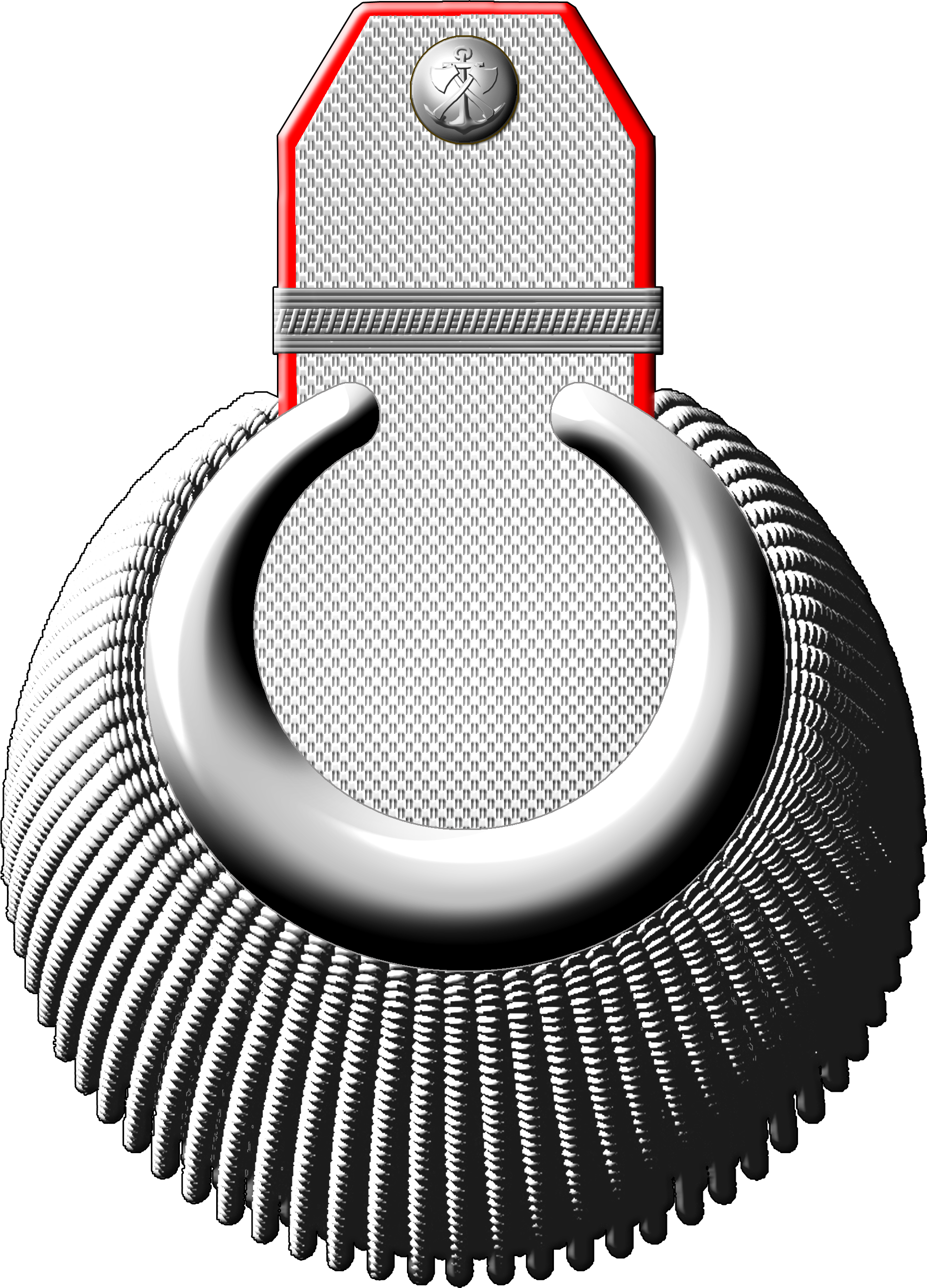
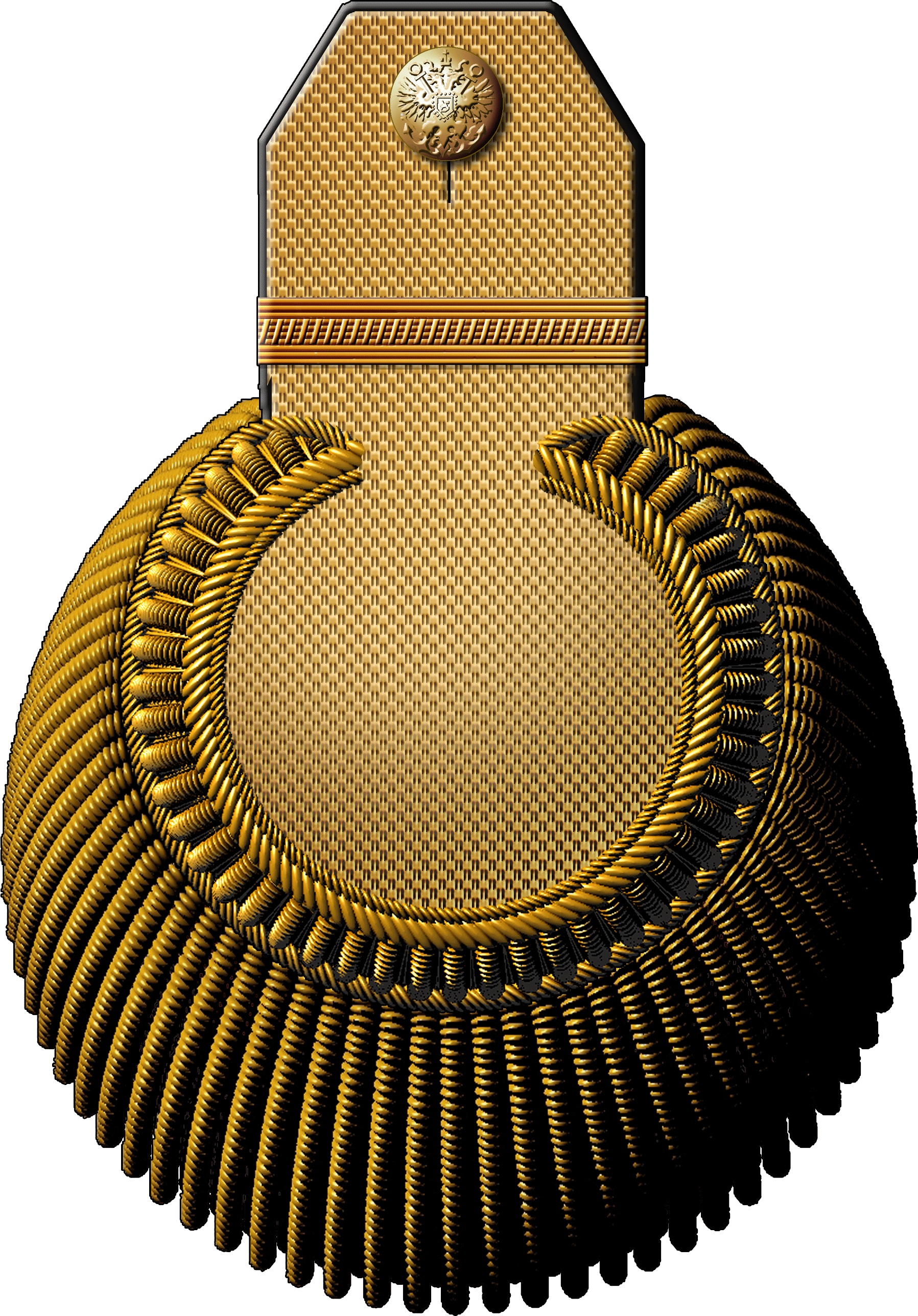
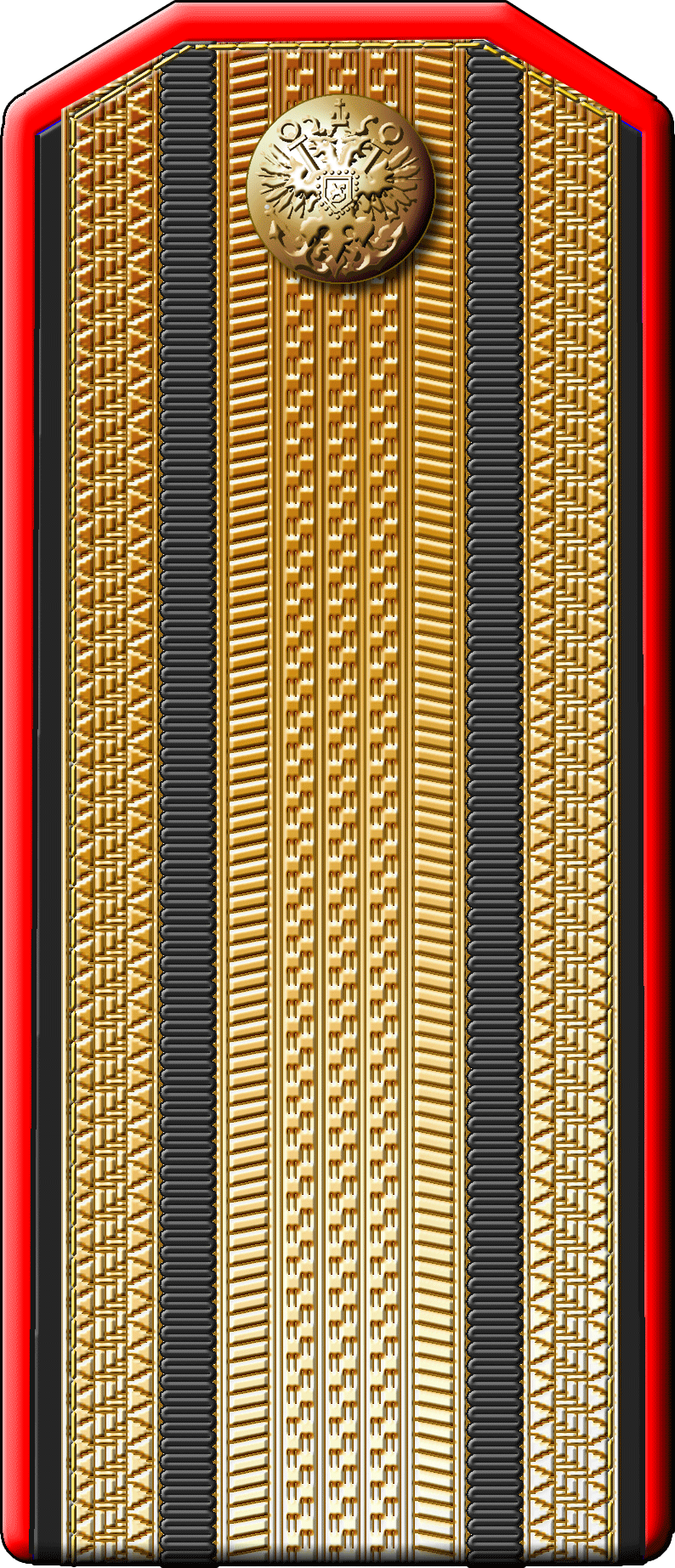
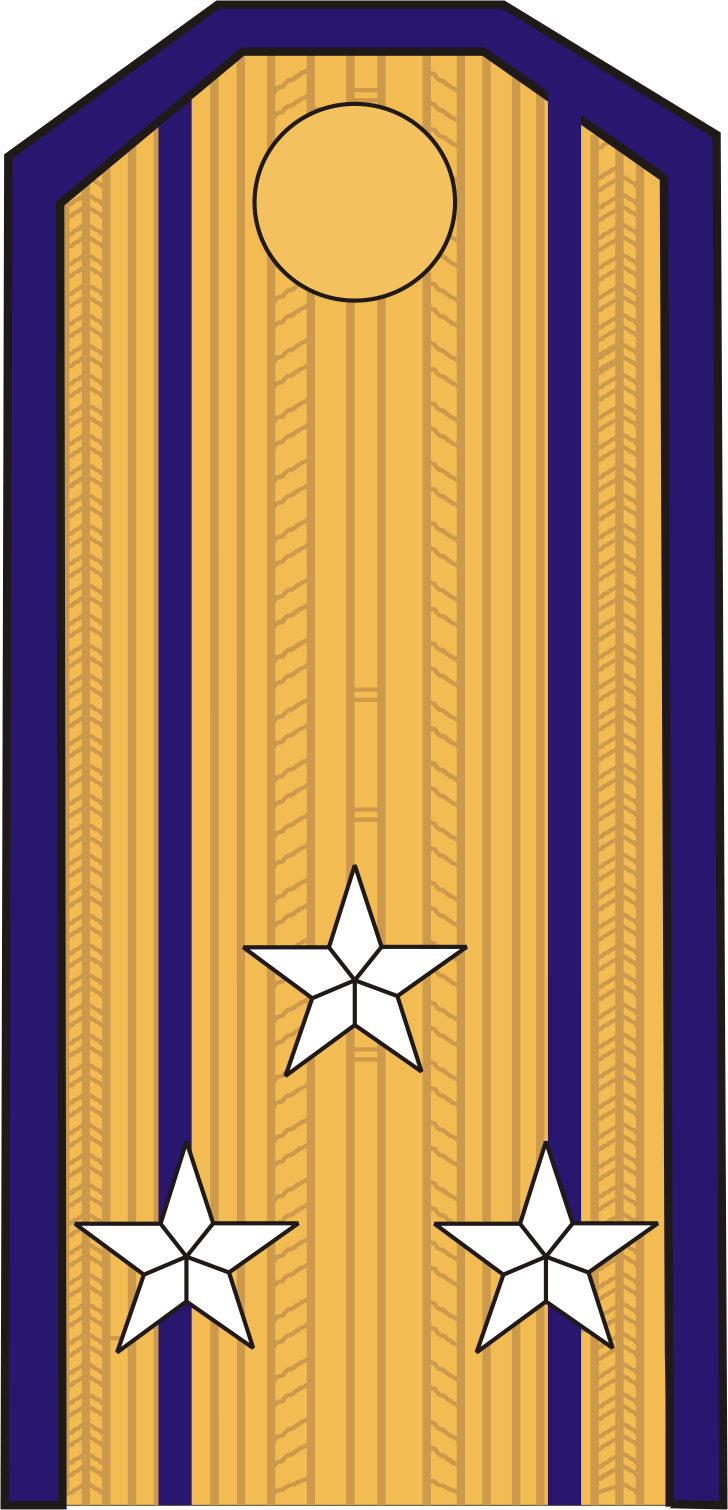
Rank	Imperial Russian Navy					Soviet Navy				Russian Navy
insignia shoulder sleeve
	Kapitan; 1st rank Polkovnik; Kollezhski sekretar (1904–1917)	Kapitan; 1st rank (1904–1917)	Commodore engineer mechanic (1896—1904)	Engineer mechanic 1st rang (1913—1917)	Polkovnik naval artillery (1913—1917)	Ship commander 1st rank (1918–1935)	Kapitan; 1st rank (1935–1991)	... service (1943–1955)	... parade (1955-1991)	... parade (1994–2010)	... parade to white shirt (1994–2010)	... everyday (1994–2010)	... parade (since 2010)

== Captain 1st rank insignia ==
Kapiten Rangut I
(Albanian Naval Force)

Birinci dərəcəli kapitan
(Azerbaijani Navy)

Капитан I ранг
Kapitan I rang
(Bulgarian Navy)

Бірінші дәрежелі капитан
Birinşi därejeli kapïtan
(Kazakh Naval Forces)

Капитан 1-го ранга
Kapitan 1-go ranga
(Russian Navy)

1-nji derejeli kapitan
(Turkmen Naval Forces)

Капітан I рангу
Kapitan I ranhu
(Ukrainian Navy)

I rang kapitani
(Uzbek River Force)

== See also ==
- Ranks and rank insignia of the Russian armed forces until 1917
- Ranks and rank insignia of the Red Army 1918–1935, ... 1935–1940 and ... 1940–1943
- Ranks and rank insignia of the Soviet Army 1943–1955 and Ranks and rank insignia of the Soviet Army 1955–1991,
- Ranks and rank insignia of the Russian Federation´s armed forces 1994–2010
- Naval ranks and insignia of the Russian Federation
