= Komandarm 2nd rank =

Army commander 2nd class командующий армией 2-го ранга
- Coat-collar insignia
- Country: Soviet Union
- Service branch: Red Army
- Abbreviation: Komandarm 2nd rank
- Formation: 1935
- Abolished: 1940
- Next higher rank: Komandarm 1st rank
- Next lower rank: Komkor
- Equivalent ranks: Fleet flag officer 2nd rank

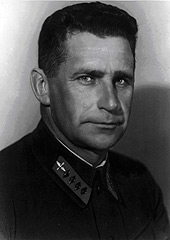
Komandarm 2nd rank, collar insignia

Komandarm 2nd rank (Russian: командарм 2-го ранга) is the abbreviation to commanding officer of the army 2nd class (Russian: командующий армией 2-го ранга, romanized: komanduyushchiy armiyey 2-go ranga; lit. 'Commander of the Army / Army commander 2nd rank'), and was a military rank in the Soviet Armed Forces of the USSR in the period from 1935 to 1940. It was also the designation to military personnel appointed to command a field army sized formation (XXXX).

Until 1940 it was the third highest military rank of the Red Army. It was equivalent to Komissar army 2nd rank (ru: армейский комиссар 2-ого ранга) of the political staff in all military branches, Fleet Flag Officer 2nd rank (ru: флагман флота 2-ого ранга) in the Soviet navy, or to Komissar of state security 2nd rank (ru: комиссар государственной безопасности 2-ого ранга). With the reintroduction of regular general ranks, the designation Komandarm 1st rank was abolished, and replaced by General of the Army or Colonel general.

== History ==
Following the foundation of the Soviet Union the rank designation and rank insignia of the Imperial Russian Army was suppressed. However, an alternative rank structure was introduced by disposal of the Central Executive Committee of the Soviet Union and the Council of People's Commissars, from September 22, 1935.

The new rank structure was as follows:

- Command level Brigade X: Kombrig (Brigadier)
- Command level Division XX: Komdiv (Division commander)
- Command level Corps XXX: Komkor (Korps commander)
- Command level Field army XXXX: Komandarm 2nd rank (Army commander 2nd rank – Commander Army)
- Command level Army group, Front XXXXX: Komandarm 1st rank (Army commander 1st rank – Front commander)
- Marshal of the Soviet Union

These ranks were abolished by the introduction of general ranks by disposal of the Supreme Soviet of the Soviet Union in May 1940. For example, military staff with the individual rank Komandarm 2nd rank were converted to the equivalent general's rank.

In 1935, a total number of ten military people graduated to Komandarm 2nd rank. However, by the end of the year all ten had been executed. At the end of the 1930s the number of staff, promoted Komandarm 2nd rank, had grown to 21 people. With the introduction of the general ranks in 1940, 12 Komandarm 2nd rank were converted to Lieutenant general (here OF-7), seven to Colonel general (OF-8), and two to General of the Army (OF-9).

Komkor. However, reprisals were made on 59 Komkor in the period 1937–1938. In line to the reintroduction of the regular military rank system in 1940, one Komkor was promoted to General of the Army (Georgy Zhukov), 51 to Lieutenant general (OF-7), and six to Major general (OF-6). Finally, Komkor Leonid Grigorevich Petrovsky was promoted to Lieutenant general in 1941.

== Rank insignia ==
Overcoat collar patch (big)

Jacket collar patch and Gymnastyorka

Chevron/ sleeve insignia

== Appointment ==
=== 1935 ===
On occasion of the introduction of the particular rank 10 military leader were promoted to Komandarm 2nd rank. In a period of three years all 10 were executed. However, with the increase of the Red Army's personnel strength the number of Komandarm 2nd rank grew as well. With the reintroduction of general's rank in 1940, twelve of them were converted to Lieutenant general (OF-7), seven to Colonel general (OF-8), and two to General of the Army (OF-9).

Appointment to Komandarm 2nd rank as to the disposal of the Central Executive Committee of the Soviet Union and the Council of People's Commissars (CPC) from November 11, 1935:

1. Yakov Alksnis (1897–1938) — executed 1938, rehabilitated 1956
2. Jukums Vācietis (1873–1938) — executed 1938, rehabilitated 1957
3. August Kork (1887—1937) — head of the Frunze Military Academy, executed 1937
4. Pavel Dybenko (1889—1938) — Commander of the Volga Military District, executed 1938
5. Mikhail Lewandowski (1890—1938) — Commander of the Transcaucasian Military District, executed 1938
6. Ivan Fedko (1897—1939) — Commander of the Maritime Group of Forces, promoted to Komandarm 1st rank in 1938, executed 1939
7. Nikolai Kashirin (1888—1938) — Commander of the North Caucasus Military District, executed 1938
8. Alexander Sedyakin (1893—1938) — Deputy Head of the headquarters of the General staff of the RED ARMY, executed 1938.
9. Innokenty Khalepsky (1893—1938) — the head of the main Directorate of the Ministry of Defense, executed 1938.
10. Ivan Dubovoy (1896—1938) — Commander of the Kharkov military district, executed 1938

=== 1937 ===
- Mikhail Velikanov (1893—1938) — executed 1938, rehabilitated 1956
- Grigory Kulik (1890–1950)) — promoted to Komandarm 1st rank, Marshal of the Soviet Union, executed 24.08.1950
- Semyon Timoshenko (1895—1970), promoted to Marshal of the Soviet Union

=== 1938 ===
- Aleksandr Loktionov (1893—1941), converted to Colonel general, executed 1941

=== 1939 ===
- Iosif Apanasenko (1890—1943), converted to General of the Army; killed in action
- Oka Gorodovikov (1879—1960), converted to Colonel general;
- Grigory Shtern (1900—1941), converted to Colonel general, executed 1941
- Ivan Zakharkin (1889—1944), converted to lieutenant general, later promoted to colonel general, killed in automobile accident
- Vladimir Kurdyumov (1895—1970), converted to lieutenant general
- Mikhail Grigoryevich Yefremov (1897—1942), converted to lieutenant general, killed in action
- Ivan Boldin (1892—1965), converted to lieutenant general, later promoted to colonel general
- Mikhail Kovalyov (1897—1967), converted to lieutenant general, later promoted to colonel general
- Ivan Konev (1897—1973), converted to lieutenant general, later promoted to Marshal of the Soviet Union
- Kirill Meretskov (1897—1968), converted to general of the army, later promoted to Marshal of the Soviet Union
- Mikhail Khozin (1896—1979), converted to lieutenant general, later promoted to colonel general
- Ivan Tyulenev (1892—1978), converted to general of the army
- Vladimir Kachalov (1890—1941), converted to Lieutenant General, was killed at the front, posthumously convicted of treason, family repressed, rehabilitated in 1953
- Stepan Kalinin (1890—1975), converted to Lieutenant General, arrested in 1944, released and rehabilitated in 1953

=== 1940 ===
- Vladimir Grendal (ru) (1884—1940), converted to Colonel general; died of natural causes 1940
- Nikolai Voronov (1899—1968), converted to Colonel general, Marshal of artillery, Chief Marshal of artillery;
- Dmitry Pavlov (1897—1941), converted to Lieutenant general, General of the Army, executed 1941;
- Yakov Smushkevich (1900—1941), converted to Lieutenant general of aviation, executed 1941.

== See also ==
- Ranks and rank insignia of the Red Army 1935–1940, and ... 1940–1943
