= Komdiv =

USSR abbreviation to commanding officer of the division

Divisional commander командир дивизии
- Coat-collar insignia
- Country: Soviet Union
- Service branch: Red Army
- Abbreviation: Komdiv
- Formation: 1935; 90 years ago
- Abolished: 1940; 85 years ago
- Next higher rank: Komkor
- Next lower rank: Kombrig
- Equivalent ranks: Flag Officer 2nd rank

Komdiv (Russian: комдив) is the syllabic abbreviation of commanding officer of the division (Russian: командир дивизии, romanized: komandir divizii; lit. 'commander of the division / division commander'), and was a military rank in the Soviet Armed Forces of the USSR in the period from 1935 to 1940. It was also the designation to military personnel appointed to command a division sized formation (XX).

Until 1940, it was the fourth highest military rank of the Red Army, and was equivalent to Division commissar (дивизионный комиссар) of the political staff in all military branches, Flag Officer 2nd rank (Russian: флагман 2-го ранга, romanized: flagman 2-go ranga) in the Soviet navy, or to 'senior major of state security' (старший майор государственной безопасности). With the reintroduction of regular general ranks in 1940, the designation komdiv was abolished, and replaced by Lieutenant general.

== History ==
This particular rank was introduced by disposal of the Central Executive Committee of the Soviet Union and the Council of People's Commissars, from September 22, 1935. The new rank structure was as follows:

- Command level Brigade X: Kombrig (Brigadier)
- Command level Division XX: Komdiv (Division commander)
- Command level Corps XXX: Komkor (Korps commander)
- Command level Field army XXXX: Komandarm 2nd rank (Army commander 2nd rank – Commander Army)
- Command level Army group, Front XXXXX: Komandarm 1st rank (Army commander 1st rank – Front commander)
- Marshal of the Soviet Union

== Rank insignia ==
Overcoat collar patch (big)

Jacket collar patch and Gymnastyorka

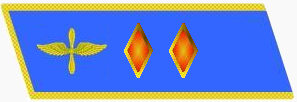
... Air Force

Chevron/ sleeve insignia

== See also ==
- Ranks and rank insignia of the Red Army 1935–1940, and ... 1940–1943
