= Gymnastyorka =

Russian military smock

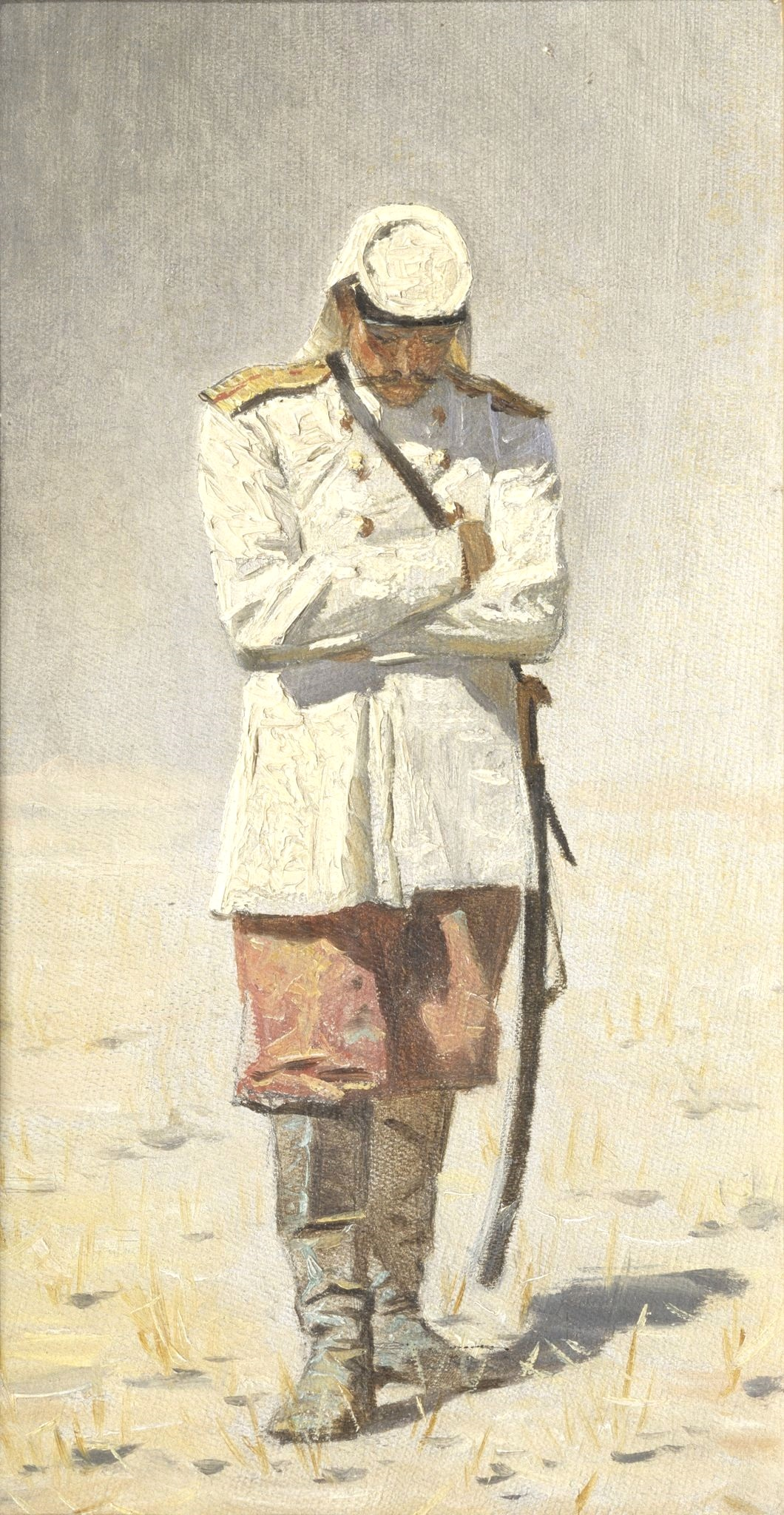
Double-breasted officers' model Gimnasterka (kitel) around 1873

Gymnastyorka (usually transliterated in English as gimnasterka; also spelled gymnastiorka; Russian: гимнастёрка, IPA: [gʲɪmnɐˈsʲtʲɵrkə]) was a Russian military smock comprising a pullover-style garment with a standing collar having double button closure. Additionally, one or two upper chest pockets, with or without flaps, may have been worn. It had provision for shoulder boards (epaulettes or shoulder straps) and sometimes reinforced elbows and cuffs. The Tsarist version had the standing collar while the M35 version had a stand-and-fall collar which was replaced with the standing collar in the M43 version. The Soviet military M35 version usually had hidden buttons. A double-breasted version (kitel) for officers of all ranks existed during the Tsarist period.

== Materials ==
While the originals were made of white linen, the M43 "gymnasterka" is made of cotton. The wartime and 1950s gymnasterka were made of a cotton drill, often in a variety of colors, which all faded into hues of yellow, orange, and others. This heavy fading is characteristic of pure cotton, which does not hold dye well.

Some are made of a strange "double diagonal" cotton fabric. Some are made by "lend lease" materials. Some examples during World War II appear to be made of wool, and they lack the diagonal weave of drill, twill, or gaberdine.

== Origins ==
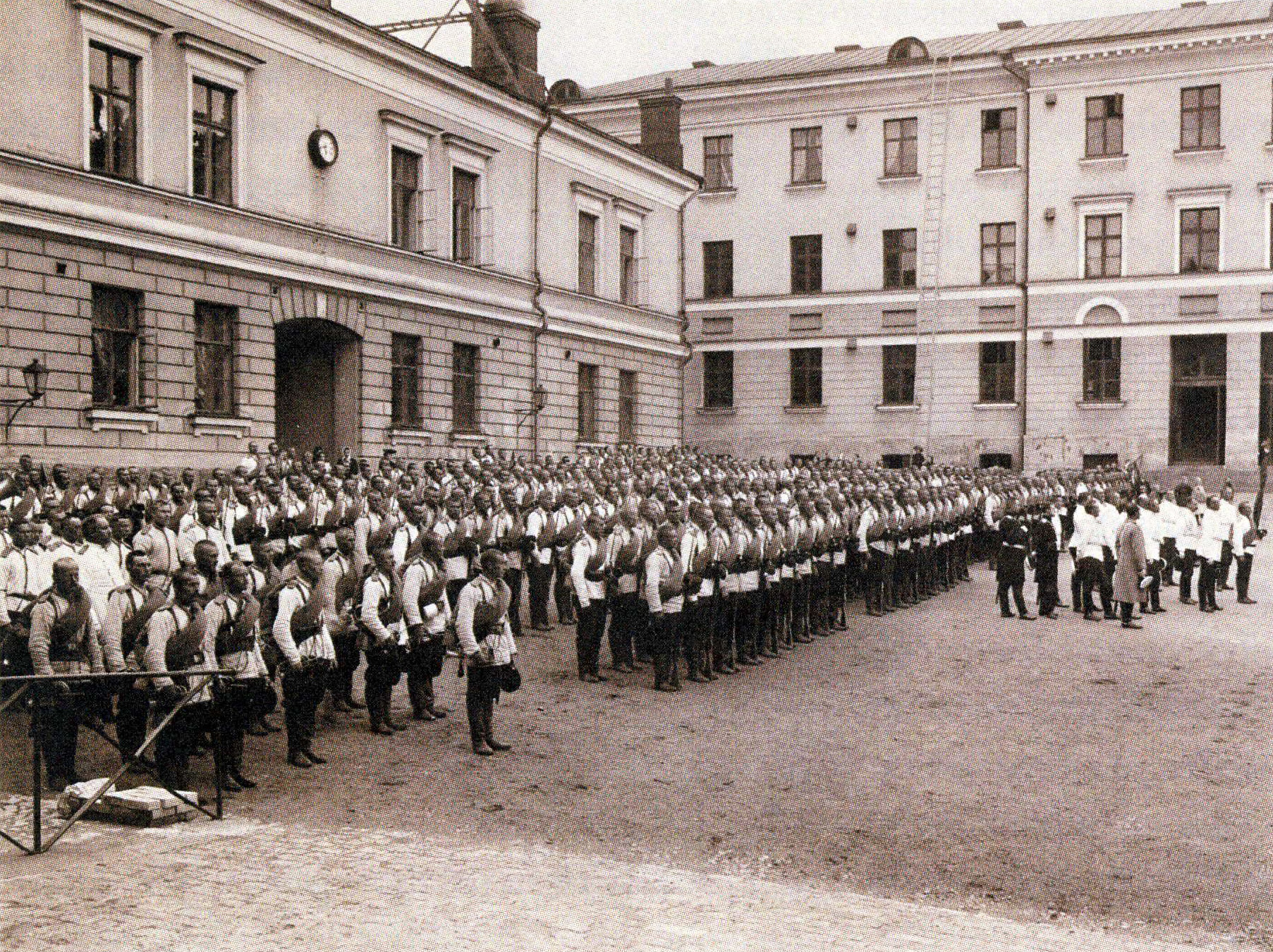
Finnish Guards' Rifle Battalion on parade in white gymnastyorka shirt-tunics April 1905. Officers at right are wearing the kitel tunic.

The gymnastyorka (till 1917 officially named "gymnastic tunic", гимнастическая рубаха) was originally introduced into the Imperial Russian Army in about 1870 for wear by regiments stationed in Turkestan during the hot summers. It took the form of a loose fitting white linen "shirt-tunic" and included the coloured shoulder-boards of the dark green tunic worn during the remainder of the year. The gymnastyorka was taken into use by all branches of the Imperial Russian Army at the time of the Russo-Turkish War of 1877–1878. Originally intended as a working dress during peacetime and patterned on the traditional Russian peasant smock, the gymnastyorka was subsequently adopted for ordinary duties and active service wear. It was worn as such by non-commissioned ranks in summer during the 1890s and early 1900s. The officers' equivalent was a white double-breasted tunic or kitel. During the Russo-Japanese War of 1904–1905 the white gymnastyorka with its red or blue shoulder-boards proved too conspicuous against modern weaponry and the garments were often dyed various shades of khaki. The smartness and comfort of the white gymnastyorka enabled it to survive for a few more years of peacetime wear until a light khaki version was adopted in 1907–1909 and worn during World War I.

== Post-Revolution ==
After the Russian Revolution of 1917, a new version of the gymnastyorka with a stand-and-fall collar was issued to the Bolshevik forces, with three razgovory straps sown across the chest in branch colours. During the Russian Civil War, both the counter-revolutionary White Army and the Bolshevik Red Army wore gymnastyorkas, White Army troops were issued with new black gymnastyorkas of the original Imperial pattern, some of them wore old khaki-green or white ones, but all of them had shoulder-boards. The Bolshevik Red Army wore both original Imperial pattern shirt-tunics and ones of a new model, with or without the coloured stripes, but some added with two breast pockets. The wide variety of uniforms worn by both sides during the Civil War arose from supply and production difficulties in the chaotic conditions of the time.

In 1924, the shoulder straps were abolished, and in 1935 the gymnastyorka was modified to accommodate the reintroduction of personal ranks in the Red Army. The M35 version was slightly modified on 1 August 1941 after the experience of the Winter War, replacing the colorful rank collar tabs, with duller and subdued ones. In 1943, the traditional Tsarist version with stand collar and shoulder-boards was reintroduced, replacing the M35 gymnastyorka. The M43 remained in service until the gymnastyorka was finally abolished in 1969.

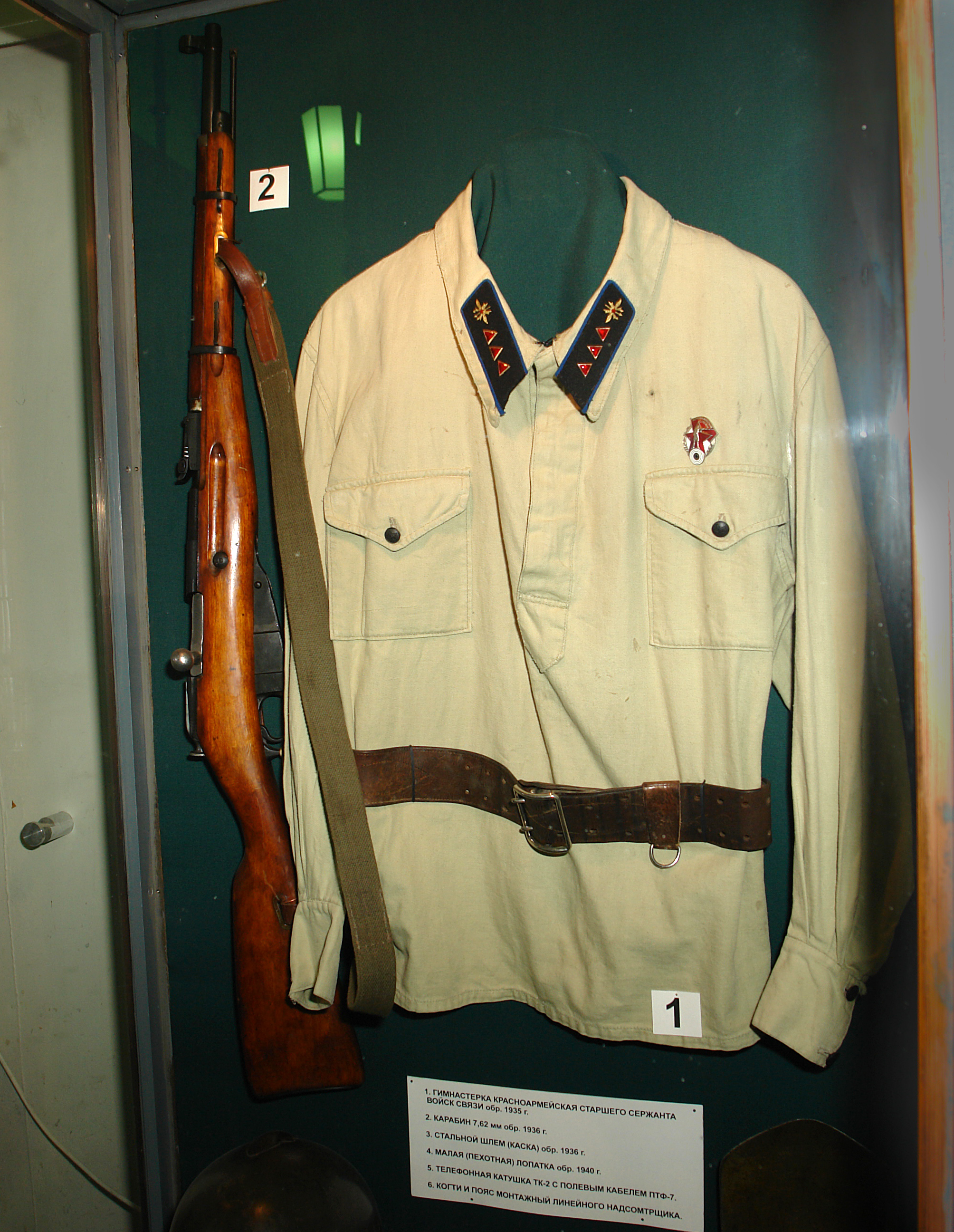
Gymnastyorka of a senior sergeant of the Red Army (1935)

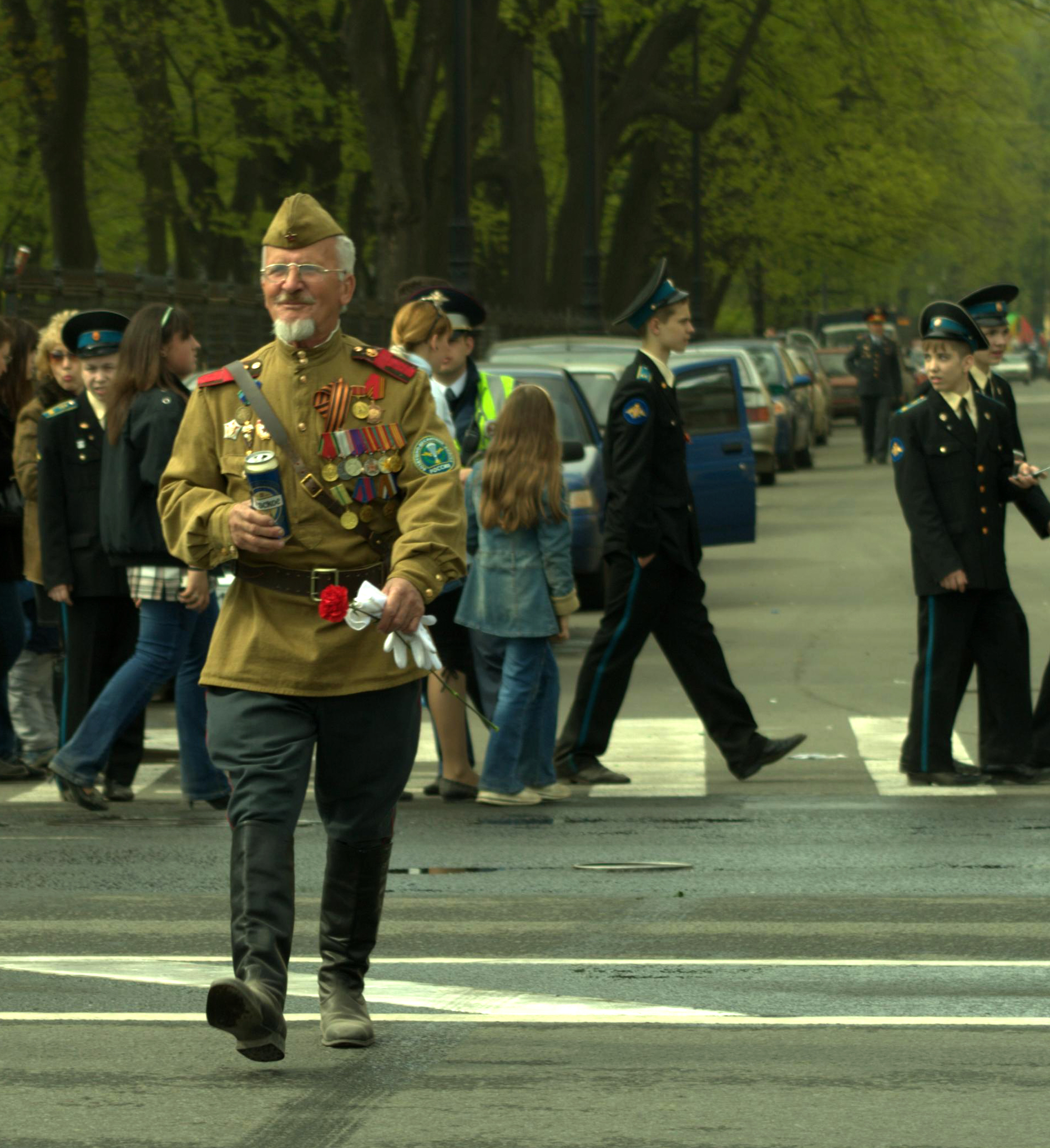
1943 version

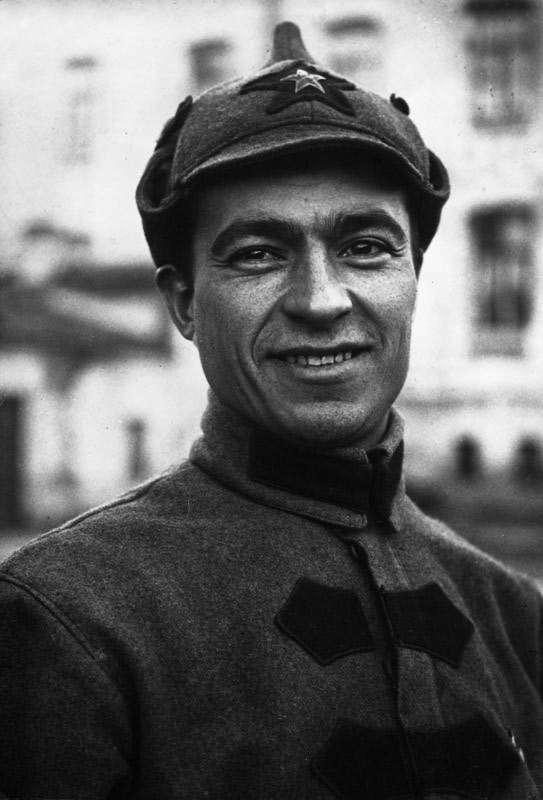
Red Army soldier wearing a budenovka and a Russian Civil War-era pattern gymnastyorka with three razgovory straps sewn across the chest.

== Other users ==
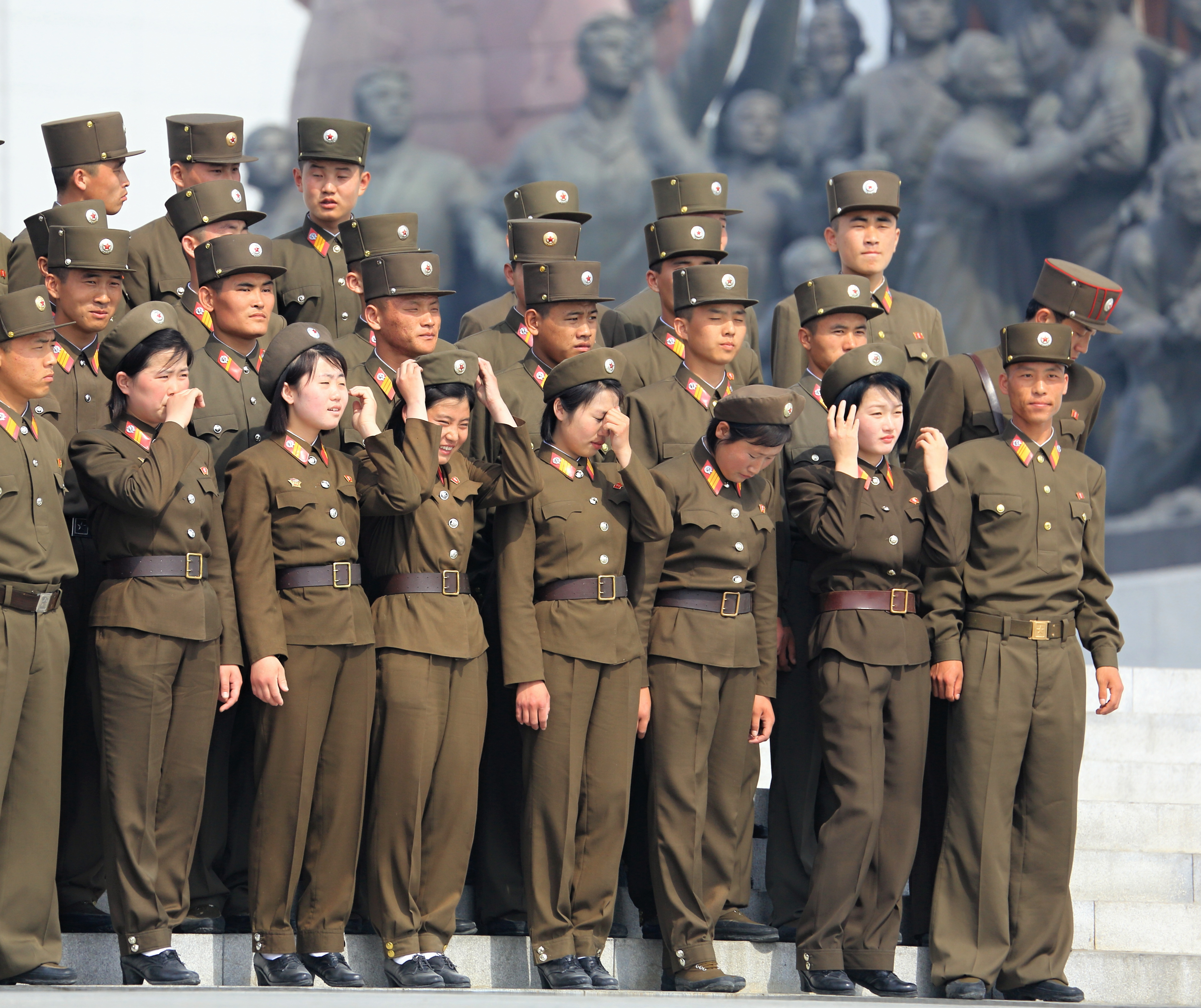
Enlisted soldiers of the Korean People's Army posing for a group photo on Mansu Hill Grand Monument. The men wear gymnastyorkas tucked into their trousers.

The gymnastyorka was also adopted by several Soviet satellite states such as Bulgaria, Mongolia, Albania, and North Korea. Enlisted soldiers in the North Korean Army continue to wear the gymnastyorka as part of their field uniform.

The Tsarist police also wore the white gymnastyorka as a summer garment until 1917. Their successors, the Soviet Militsiya, continued to wear this traditional garment until the 1950s.

== See also ==
- Kosovorotka
- List of Russian inventions
- Military uniform
- Pilotka
