= 6th Rifle Division (Soviet Union) =

Division of the Red Army

- Active: 1918–1939 (1st formation); 1939–1945 (2nd formation); 1955–1957 (3rd formation)
- Country: Soviet Union
- Branch: Soviet Army
- Type: Infantry
- Size: Division
- Engagements: Russian Civil War; Soviet Westward Offensive; Estonian War of Independence; Polish-Soviet War; Battle of Warsaw; World War II; Invasion of Poland; Eastern Front; Operation Barbarossa; First Battle of Voronezh; Third Battle of Kharkov; Battle of Korsun–Cherkassy; Uman–Botoșani Offensive; Battle of Debrecen; Budapest offensive; Bratislava-Brno Offensive; Western Carpathian offensive; Prague offensive; Invasion of Manchuria; Khingan–Mukden Operation
- Decorations: Order of the Red Banner (2nd formation); Order of Suvorov, 2nd class (2nd formation)
- Battle honours: Orel (1st formation); Khingan (2nd formation)

Commanders
- Notable commanders: Dmitri Parsky

The 6th Rifle Division was an infantry division of the Soviet Union's Red Army. Formed multiple times, it participated in several battles, most notably the Soviet westward offensive of 1918–1919, the Estonian War of Independence and the Polish–Soviet War.The division's first formation was awarded the Order of the Red Banner twice and the Order of Suvorov 2nd class for its valor in combat. In November 1945, the division was disbanded. It was briefly reformed in 1955 but disbanded again in 1957.

== First formation ==
=== 1918 ===
The 6th Rifle Division was formed as the Gatchina Infantry Division on 23 May 1918 in Gdov by order of the Chief of Staff of the Petrograd Defense District and the Northern Section of the Screen Detachments. It was made up of Red Guard detachments from Petrograd, soldiers of Pavel Dybenko's volunteer detachment, and workers from Narva. From May to November 1918, the division was deployed in the vicinity of Ivangorod. On 31 May, by order of the Supreme Military Soviet, the division as renamed the 3rd Petrograd Infantry Division; on 11 September 1918, by order of the Revolutionary Military Soviet, the division was renamed the 6th Rifle Division.

Until November 1918, the division defended the approaches to Petrograd from Narva and Reval. From November 1918 to January 1919, it took part in the Soviet westward offensive, a campaign to conquer the Baltic states and Belarus. On 28 November 1918, the division occupied the city of Narva and further advanced to the Jägala river, reaching it in December.

=== 1919 ===
In January 1919, the division retreated from the offensive, fighting White and Estonian formations, seeing action near Koporye. In May 1919, the division was joined by troops of the Combined Baltic Division. From May to October, it fought Nikolai Yudenich's Northwestern Army during the defense of Petrograd. In 12 May, the division defended a wide front that passed through the villages of Ilkina, Fitinka, Korostel, and Keykino and further along the left bank of the Luga to the Lom estate. From the Lom estate to the village of Karlovo, the defensive front intercepted the line of the Baltic Railway and the Narva Highway. Then the front stretched from the village of Karlovo to the mouth of the Plyusa River, then along the railroad bed to the Gostisty station and further south to the junction with the Chudsk section of the Estonian Red Riflemen. At this point, the division numbered up to 4,600 soldiers and 23 guns. On the night of 13 May, the White army went on the offensive and broke through the division's defense on the left flank; as a result, the 53rd and 167th regiments were routed and forced to retreat to the village of Arinovka, and two of the division's armored trains were destroyed.

In autumn, the division defeated the Estonian 1st Division's Krasnaya Gorka offensive. In October, the division went on the offensive and captured Krasnoye Selo. In November and December, the division participated in the Narva offensive, which ended the Estonian War of Independence. The Estonian 1st Division and the White Northwestern Army were pushed beyond the Soviet-Estonian border. The unit was redesignated twice during this campaign.

=== 1920 ===
From January to May 1920, the division defended the Soviet-Estonian border. In May, the division was called to participate in the Polish–Soviet War, where it saw heavy action; from 14 May to 8 June, during the Battle of the Berezina, the division participated in the Maladzyechna offensive towards the Polotsk and Lyepel area; from 4 to 23 July, during the July Operation, it participated in battles in the Dokshytsy and Hlybokaye area, crossed the Sosha and Berezina rivers, and occupied Dolginovo and Lida; from 23 July to 25 August, it participated in the Battle of Warsaw, during which it crossed the Neman, occupied Vawkavysk, Bielsk, and Serock, advanced along the Bug towards Warsaw, and then retreated, waging rearguard battles. In September, the division had now moved to battle around Grodno. On 22 July 1920, the division took part in the crossing of the Neman during the First Battle of the Niemen River. The division pushed back the Polish-led 1st Lithuanian–Belarusian Division in the vicinity of Masty. Although ultimately stopped by the Polish 81st Grodno Rifles Infantry Regiment, the division forced the Polish troops to retreat and abandon their lines.

Following the Polish summer retreat towards the Vistula, the division pursued the Polish forces. On 9 August it captured Wyszków and then advanced north of Bug, Narew, and Vistula towards Łomża. The town fell to the Soviet forces, but a successful counter-attack on Łomża carried out by Polish 59th Greater Polish Infantry Regiment recaptured the town. The 6th Rifle Division lost many of their prisoners of war. Following the Battle of Warsaw, the 6th Rifle Division was defeated. Recreated as part of the Soviet defenses along the Niemen river, it took part in the Second Battle of the Niemen River. Defeated east of Vileyka by Polish cavalry, it was surrounded and eliminated. The Polish forces captured its headquarters, tabor, 13 field kitchens, and the remaining two pieces of artillery, as well as all commanding officers of the division's regiments.

=== Interwar period ===
The unit was later re-created behind the front. On 13 March 1921, by order of the 14th Army, the division was transferred to the Orel Military District; the division was stationed in the city of Oryol from March 1921 to September 1939. On 30 November 1921, it received the honorific "Oryol".

In June 1922, the division was reduced to the staff of a peacetime rifle division. In September 1925, it was reduced to the staff of a territorial division (1,862 men). On 2 January 1929, in honor of its tenth anniversary, the division was awarded the Honorary Red Banner of the Central Executive Committee of the USSR.

In May 1936, the division was again expanded into a regular rifle division with a strength of 6,000 men; In September 1936, it was again reduced to the staff of a territorial division with a strength of 4,000. In May 1938, it was expanded into a reduced regular rifle division of triple deployment with a strength of 5,090 men.

In late 1937, the division's command staff was under investigation and many were arrested, including division commander Ivan Shafransky and several brigade and regiment commanders. They were charged with participating in an "anti-Soviet military-fascist conspiracy". On 20 October 1938, the Military Collegium of the Supreme Court of the USSR sentenced 15 of those arrested, excluding Shafransky, to death; the sentence was carried out on the same day in Oryol. The burial site is not documented On 29 June 1957, the Military Collegium fully rehabilitated the executed servicemen due to lack of evidence of any crime committed and ruled that they were wrongfully convicted.

== Second formation ==
In 1939 each regiment of the division was expanded to form a new division, resulting in the creation of the new 6th, 122nd and 180th Rifle Divisions. From September of that year, it was brought up to the wartime staff of 14,000 men.

=== 1939 ===
The Second Formation of the 6th Rifle Division, probably formed from the 16th Rifle Regiment of the original division, took part in the Soviet invasion of Poland in September 1939. On 11 September, the division was ordered to prepare for deployment at Oryol station by 13 September, and transported to Belarus by rail within 3 days. On 17 September, it was a part of 11th Rifle Corps of 10th Army of the Belorussian Front (1939) and was concentrated in the Minsk area. On 19 September, the division crossed the Polish border and by the end of the day was concentrated in the Mir-Stolpce-Opechki area. By 1 October, the division completed a continuous 450-kilometer march, during which it disarmed small groups of Polish soldiers and officers. By the evening of 1 October, the division reached the Vishnitsy-Kuzovka-Mezhyles line. On 2 October, it was a part of 24th Rifle Corps of 4th Army of the Belorussian Front.

From 4 to 14 October 1939, the division retreated to the demarcation line along the eastern bank of the Bug to its permanent deployment sites and concentrated in the area of Brest-Litovsk and adjacent areas north of the Mukhavets, assuming garrison duty in Brest-Litovsk and guarding the Soviet border along the Bug. During the Winter War, two march battalions were formed from the division to be sent to the front.

After the end of the Soviet invasion of Poland in October 1939 the division became part of the Belorussian Special Military District's 6th Rifle Corps in the 4th Army. Almost the entire division (except for its howitzer regiment) was deployed within the Brest Fortress in the Western Special Military District.

=== 1941 ===
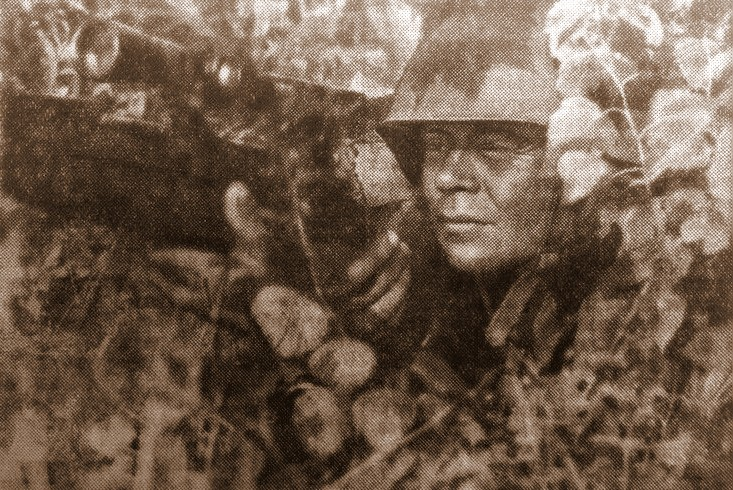
Chief of the sniper team of the 125th rifle regiment, Lieutenant G. L. Vezhnevets, July 1941

==== June ====
On the night of 14 June 1941, the division was put on combat alert. The division comprised the 84th, 125th, and 333rd Rifle Regiments, the 131st Artillery Regiment, and the 204th Howitzer Artillery Regiment. It began operations against the Germans with 13,700 personnel. However, Glantz writing in Colossus Reborn in 2005, says division strength on 22 June 1941, was 11,592.

The German attack, Operation Barbarossa, was launched on 22 June 1941. At that time many natives from Voronezh Oblast (from a draft in 1940 and spring 1941) served in the division's units. The division was stationed in and around the Brest Fortress and went into action as early as 4AM against the German offense and suffered heavy losses. The division was split into several groups and retreated to the east in disarray. By the end of 22 June, the main forces and the division headquarters was in the Khvedkovichi area. A second group, composed of the remainders of the 125th Rifle Regiment and 111th Engineer Battalion, was north of Zhabinka. A third group, composed of the 84th Rifle Regiment and 204th Howitzer Artillery Regiment, was fighting in the Radvanichi area. The remainder of the division was encircled within Brest fortress and was destroyed during the prolonged defense of the fortress, which later became a symbol of Soviet resistance.

On 23 June, the division retreated to Kobryn. The German 3rd Panzer Division's offensive cut the division into two groups during the day. The 204th Howitzer Regiment and other units led by the commander and chief of staff of the division retreated along the Pinsk road, while elements of the divisional staff, remnants of the artillery, rear units, and remnants of the 84th and 333rd Rifle Regiments retreated northeast along the Warsaw highway under command of the division commissar. By the end of the day, the main forces of the division retreated to the eastern bank of the Yaselda north and south of Byaroza. At about 6AM on 24 June, German air bombers attacked the units defending on the Yaselda and resumed the attack under a heavy artillery barrage. A group of German tanks managed to break through the defense and reach the Warsaw road south of the village of Bronnaya Gora.

On 25 June, the division's units continued to hold the defense on the Włodawa-Małorita line. After suffering heavy losses, the remnants of the division joined a combined unit under the command of General Popov and retreated beyond the Ptsich River and moved to Babruysk in the afternoon. The division defended the eastern bank of the Berezina River outside of the city. It demolished the bridge across the Berezina. By midday on 28 June, the Wehrmacht had broken through the weak defense near Babruysk, captured the city, and reached the Berezina. At sunset, the division's scattered units headed toward Rogachev. By 30 June, the division's remnants had gathered in the Dovsk area.

==== July ====
On 1 July, the units approached Pinsk. After heavy fighting, the detachments held back the advance of the German army corps on the approaches to Pinsk, then retreated to the Cherykaw area. By 5 July, only 340 men remained in the division. Near Cherikov, the main forces of the division were joined by a detachment under the command of the deputy division commander Ostashenko, numbering more than 1,000 men.

On 14 July, the division took part in a counterattack near Mstislaw, and the 335th Rifle Regiment was subordinated to the 55th Rifle Division, fighting near Propoisk. On 17 July, the division retreated beyond the Sozh, where units of the 132nd and 137th Rifle Divisions were breaking through the encirclement. Starting on 17 July, the 4th Airborne Corps attacked the German forces in the Mstislaw and Krychaw area almost daily; during this offensive, a combined detachment of the division, led by the division commander, was transferred to reinforce the corps. The paratroopers and the division units managed to drive the Wehrmacht out of Krychaw several times, inflicted heavy losses on the Wehrmacht's 3rd Panzer Division as it attempted to cross the Sozh, and eventually forced it to go on the defensive near Krychaw.

On 26 July, the Wehrmacht brought the 7th Infantry Division into battle to reinforce the 3rd and 4th Panzer Divisions. In order to localize the attack and prevent the Wehrmacht from breaking through to the rear of the Krychaw group, the division's forces remaining on the left flank of the 13th Army were redeployed to the right flank. During this regrouping, the Wehrmacht's 7th Infantry Division, which broke through east of Krychaw, encircled the division's 84th Rifle Regiment. To restore the situation, the Communist Battalion of Leningrad Volunteers was subordinated to the division and attempted to open a corridor to assist the 84th Regiment's breakout; during this maneuver, the division destroyed the Wehrmacht's 2nd Battalion of the 2nd Infantry Regiment and captured its headquarters.

==== August ====
On 1 August, the German XXIV Motorized Corps and VII Army Corps attacked the right flank of the 13th Army following mass aerial and artillery bombardments. The attacks struck the defensive positions held by the 148th Rifle Division north of Krychaw. The 4th Panzer Division advanced along the Krichev-Roslavl highway and units of the XLVI Panzer Corps advanced from Mstsislaw. Despite a counterattack by the 52nd Cavalry Division, the 6th Division was forced to retreat. On 2 August, the 4th Panzer Division, which was advancing at the spearhead of the main attack, broke into Roslavl. Units of the 6th Division on the right flank were encircled. The army commander ordered the division to strike in the southern direction and break out of the encirclement. On the night of 4 August, the division broke through the encirclement and rejoined forces with the 13th Army. On 12 August, the division fought on the Golichi-Kostyukovichi line; by this point, several battalion groups remained, but were undersupplied with weapons and ammunition. In fierce battles for the settlements of Zamość and Guta-Senska, the division inflicted significant losses German 258th Infantry Division.

In the fierce fights for settlements Zamoste, Гута-Сенска the division rendered sensitive losses to parts of the German 258th Infantry Division. The Germans left on the battlefield a hundred corpses, 30 motor vehicles, 45 motorcycles and large numbers of weapons.

==== September ====
By 1 September, the division was a part of 45th Rifle Corps of the Bryansk Front's 13th Army.

On the night of 2 September, the Wehrmacht's 29th Infantry Division of the 47th Motorized Corps crossed the Desna at the railway bridge south of Belaya Beryozka and captured a bridgehead northwest of Znob station. The command of the 13th Army took urgent measures to prevent the expansion of the German bridgehead. The division took part in the liquidation of the bridgehead together with the 50th Tank and 307th Rifle Divisions. By the morning of 7 September, Soviet troops completely drove out the Wehrmacht from the eastern bank of the Desna. On 30 September, the division fought fierce battles near Ochkine, Zhikhove, and Stara Huta, as a result of which it was encircled.

==== October and November ====
On 2 October, one of the division's regiments defended the line from the mouth of the Znobovka to Krenidovka, while the remaining units fought for Suzemka with the aim of capturing it. The battle for Suzemka continued until 8 October, which allowed the 13th Army to prepare to break through the encirclement. After the breakthrough of the main forces of the army through Negino on 9 October, the Wehrmacht captured it again and encircled the division's units.

The division commander, Colonel Mikhail Grishin, attempted to break out of the encirclement on the night of 10 October. With the onset of darkness, all of the division's remaining artillery moved to firing positions, the rifle regiments took up their initial positions, and all transport was formed into one column. At 2AM, the division units attacked the Wehrmacht forces in unison; fifteen minutes later, the transport moved forward. The noise raised by the vehicles was perceived by the Wehrmacht troops as an attack by tanks and caused them to panic; the division's fighters took advantage of this by rushing into the gap that had formed and successfully broke out of the encirclement. Soon, the Wehrmacht brought in reserves and reoccupied Negino, which prevented the army's rear and rearguard units from breaking out of the encirclement.

On the night of 14 October, the division distinguished itself by attacking Khomutovka. The division routed a Wehrmacht cavalry regiment that tried to block its path. When the division, along with the rest of the army units, approached the Rylsk-Dmitriev-Lgovsky highway, the Wehrmacht began an offensive from different directions, and the Soviet units were again surrounded, with a shortage of ammunition, food, and fuel. The decision was made to attack Skovorodnevo and Nizhnepesochnoye to the east on the night of 17 October. The breakthrough, like the previous time, was scheduled for 2AM. Taking cover in a dense pine forest, the division units concentrated at the front line of the enemy defense. When signalled, the division's troops attacked the Wehrmacht units; the offense was supported by the approaching 132nd and 143rd Rifle Divisions. The surprise and coordination of the attacks caused panic in units of the Wehrmacht's XXXXVIII Panzer Corps. Subsequently, continuously maneuvering and repelling attacks for nine days of fierce fighting, the 13th Army broke out of encirclement.

The units of the division took part in the defense of Kursk, confronting the XXXXVIII Panzer and XXXIV Army Corps and XXXV Army Corps. The 9th Panzer and 95th Infantry Divisions directly attacked the city. In the last days of October, fierce battles began on the distant approaches to Kursk. After five days, using their air and tank superiority, the Wehrmacht troops approached the city. Waging urban warfare, units of the division retreated to the Tim River by 7 November 1941. By this time, the evacuation of Kursk was complete. On 10 November, the Bryansk Front was disbanded. The division, as part of the 13th Army, was transferred to the Southwestern Front. After regrouping, the army was tasked with covering the Yelets direction and the routes connecting Moscow with the southern regions of the USSR. The division remained on the defensive at the Slepukha line (Yelets region) until the end of November.

=== 1942 ===
From 28 June to 24 July 1942, the division took part in the Battle of Voronezh. The division found itself in the direction of the main attack of the Wehrmacht, which began its offensive towards Voronezh. Holding back a superior German force, the division fought at intermediate lines. In eight days of fighting, from 28 June to 6 July, the division destroyed 53 tanks, 64 motor vehicles, 4 aircraft, and many other enemy vehicles, as well as many soldiers and officers. During this week, the division suffered heavy losses; the Wehrmacht scattered the 40th Army and cut the Kastornoye-Stary Oskol railway line, encircling the division and forcing into heavy fighting. The division managed to retreat across the Don, and, without rest or reinforcements, took up defensive positions on the left bank of Voronezh and repel the advancing Wehrmacht forces. The division successfully carried out an offensive operation on its own initiative and laid the foundation for the Chizhovsky bridgehead.

=== 1943-1945 ===
From 4 to 25 March 1943, the division participated in the Third Battle of Kharkov. On 25 October, it was awarded the Order of the Red Banner.

From 24 January to 17 February 1944, the division took part in the Battle of Korsun–Cherkassy, conducting defensive battles in the area from Vodyanoye to Kanizha in the Zvenyhorodka region. From 5 March to 17 April, the division took part in the Uman–Botoșani offensive. From 20 to 29 August, the division took part in the Second Jassy–Kishinev offensive. From 6 to 28 October, the division took part in the Battle of Debrecen. From 1 November to 31 December, the division took part in the Budapest offensive.

From 12 January to 18 February 1945, the division took part in the Western Carpathian offensive. From 25 March to 5 May, the division took part in the Bratislava–Brno offensive, during which it occupied Brno on 26 April. From 6 May to 11 May, the division took part in the Prague offensive. On 28 May, the division was awarded the Order of Suvorov, 2nd degree. By 1 August, it was transferred to the Far East, where it took part in the Khingan–Mukden Operation until 3 September. From 9 August, the division went on the offensive as part of the Transbaikal Front. Overcoming Imperial Japanese Army resistance, the division, having marched 150 kilometers, reached the spurs of the Greater Khingan. On 23 August, the division was awarded the honorific of Khingan. Beginning on 10 September, the division, as part of the 57th Rifle Corps, began disbanding, which it completed in November. The division's history is commemorated at the museum of Boarding School No.4 on Leninsky Prospekt in Voronezh.

== Third formation ==
The division was formed from the 90th Separate Rifle Brigade on 7 April 1948 with 4th Army at Lankaran. The 90th Separate Rifle Brigade had been formed in April 1943 as part of the Soviet troops in Iran. It was reorganized as the 60th Motor Rifle Division on 25 June 1957.

== Commanders ==
- Dmitri Parsky: (25/05/1918 — 27/05/1918)
- N. N. Ivanov (27/05/1918 — 14/04/1919)
- Boris Freiman (14/04/1919 — 24/05/1919)
- Pyotr Solodukhin: (24/05/1919 — 22/08/1919)
- interim Nikolay Rozanov (22/08/1919 — 03/09/1919)
- interim Larichkin (03/09/1919 — 05/10/1919)
- interim Vladimir Lyubimov (05/10/1919 — 13/11/1919)
- interim A.Kuznetsov (13/11/1919 — 24/11/1919)
- Alexey Storozhenko (24/11/1919 — 24/11/1920)
- interim Ivan Shirokiy (24/11/1920 — 05/01/1921)
- Alexey Storozhenko (05/01/1921 — 07/1923)
- Ivan Smolin (07/1923 — 06/1924)
- Pyotr Bryanskikh (1924–1927)
- Leonid Petrovsky (11/1928 — 12/1930)
- Vladimir Kachalov (01/1931 — 05/1936)
- Ivan Shafransky (05/1936 — 05/1937)
- Nikolay Zolotukhin (08/09/1937 — 14/03/1941)
- Mikhail Popsuy-Shapko (14/03/1941 — 29/07/1941)
- Fyodor Ostashenko (30/07/1941 — 13/08/1941)
- Mikhail Grishin (14/08/1941 — 30/11/1942)
- Yakov Shteiman (01/12/1942 — 09/02/1943)
- Leonid Goryashin (10/02/1943 — 30/06/1943)
- Kondraty Bilyutin (02/07/1943 — 16/08/1943)
- Efstafiy Grechany (17/08/1943 — 08/11/1943)
- Nikolai Dreier (09/11/1943 — 10/12/1943)
- Ivan Obushenko (11/12/1943 — 11/05/1945)
- Alexander Malchevsky (08/1945 — 11/1945)

== Sources ==
- http://samsv.narod.ru/Div/Sd/sd006/default.html
