= Northern Section of the Screen Detachments =

- Active: 5 March 1918 – 11 September 1918
- Country: Russian SFSR
- Branch: Red Army
- Type: Curtain forces
- Garrison/HQ: The northern section of the demarcation line with the Imperial German Army
- Engagements: World War I Russian Civil War

Commanders
- First commander: Alexey Schwartz (March 11 – May 26, 1918)
- Second commander: Dmitri Parsky (May 26 – August 8)
- Third commander: Vladimir Gittis (Aug. 8 – Sept. 11)

The Northern Section of the Screen Detachments (Russian: Северный участок отрядов завесы; NSCD) was a part of the Red Army's curtain forces created to protect Petrograd after the Treaty of Brest-Litovsk. It existed from March to September 1918.

== Formation ==
After the signing of the Treaty of Brest-Litovsk on the basis of the resolution of the Committee of Revolutionary Defense of Petrograd of March 3, 1918 and the directive of the Supreme Military Council of March 5, 1918, the curtain forces were created to cover the internal regions of Soviet Russia from a possible invasion by troops from the Imperial German Army.

The NSCD included detachments operating in the Ostrov-Staraya Russa and Polotsk-Velizh-Bely strips.

On March 14, 1918, the NSCD was merged with the Petrograd Defense District, and its management was entrusted to the headquarters of the Petrograd Defense District, which became known as the Headquarters of the Petrograd Defense District and the Northern Section of the Screen Detachments.

The troops were stationed in the following area:

- To the south was the Nevel-Velikiye Luki-Ostashkov-Bologoye railway line;
- To the west and northwest were Narva, the Narva River, Lake Peipus, Pskov, Staraya Russa, the Mezhduozerny and Karelian Isthmuses (the border with Finland), and the Gulf of Finland;
- To the east was Borovichi, the Mologa River, and Vologda.

== Composition of the NSCD ==
=== March–June ===
By order of the Military Council of the Petrograd Defense District and the Northern Section of the Screen Detachments (March 19, 1918), the formation of seven territorial military districts began within the district.

The first two districts created in March were:

- Gatchina (from the Narva Defensive Region);
- Luzhsky (from the Pskov detachments).

The next five districts were formed already in April:

- Karelsky (formerly Karelsky District);
- Yamburgsky (formerly Gatchina Military District);
- Novgorodsky (formerly Luga Military District);
- Starorussky (formerly Porkhov Defensive Region);
- Novorzhevsky.

In June, the Olonetsky section was added to them.

=== Plan ===
In April 1918, the district headquarters developed a plan to form 11 infantry divisions. In accordance with the plan, and following orders from the district Military Council, the following sections began to be reorganized:

- Karelsky — to the corps (Vologda and Olonetsk divisions);
- Yamburgsky — to the Gatchina division;
- Novgorodsky — to the corps (Pskov (Luga) and Novgorod divisions);
- Starorussky and Novorzhevsky — to the divisions of the same name. The Novorzhevsky Rifle Division later became the Pskov Rifle Division.

Additionally, corps were to be formed in Petrograd (1st and 2nd Petrograd divisions) and Bezhetsk (Bezhetsk and Mologa divisions).

The Supreme Military Council included this plan in its plan for the formation of regular units of the Red Army, abolishing the corps link.

On September 11, 1918, in connection with the creation of the Northern Front, the headquarters of the NSCD was disbanded, and the troops and commands were used to form the 6th and 7th armies of the Northern Front.

== Military Council ==
The NSCD was headed by a Military Council, which included a military commander and two commissars. The Military Council oversaw the formation of Red Army units and subunits from the local population, which were used in the NSCD or sent to other areas.

=== Military leaders ===
- Alexey Schwartz (March 11 – May 26, 1918);
- Dmitri Parsky (May 26 – August 8, 1918);
- Vladimir Gittis (August 8 – September 11, 1918).

=== Political commissars of the NSCD ===
- P. P. Torgushin (March 14 – April 15, 1918);
- A. I. Kovrigin (March 14 – April 15, 1918);
- Mikhail Lashevich (April 15 – September 11, 1918);
- Ivar Smilga (April 15 – May 30, 1918);
- L. M. Glezarova (May 30 – September 11, 1918).

== Sources ==
- Smele, Jonathan D. (2015). Historical Dictionary of the Russian Civil Wars, 1916–1926. London: Rowman & Littlefield.
- Центральный государственный архив Советской армии. В двух томах. Том 1. Путеводитель. 1991
- Портал «Война»
- «Гражданская война и военная интервенция в СССР», М., «Сов-я Энциклопедия», 1983.
