= Battle of Petrograd =

Russian Civil War 1919 battle

- Part of the Russian Civil War, Allied Intervention in the Russian Civil War, Estonian War of Independence and Heimosodat
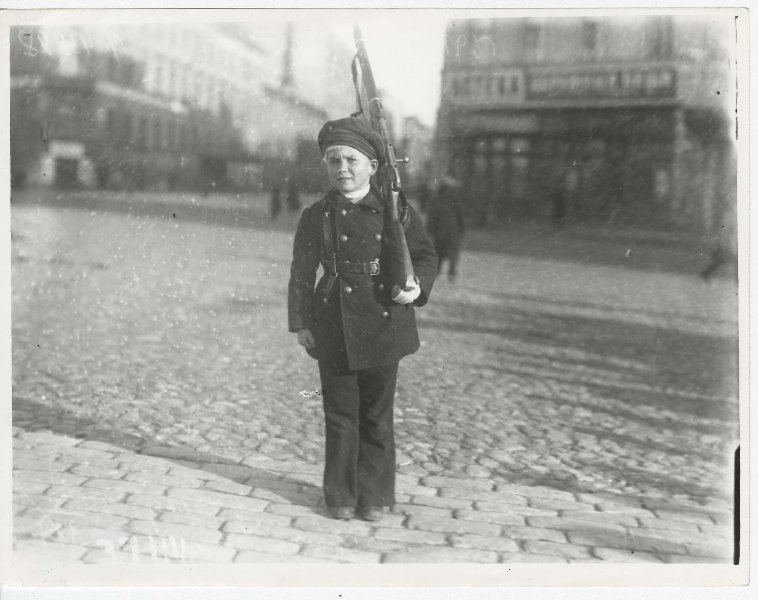
- A picture of a child soldier in Petrograd
Date	28 September – 14 November 1919 (1 month, 2 weeks and 3 days)
Location	Petrograd Governorate, Russian SFSR 60°03′0″N 31°45′0″E
Result	Soviet victory; Red Army defends Petrograd from the White Army; Dissolution of the Northwestern Army
Territorial changes	Soviets successfully defend Petrograd

Belligerents
Northwest Russia; Estonia; British Empire; North Ingria; Finland	Soviet Russia

Commanders and leaders
Nikolai Yudenich	Leon Trotsky

Units involved
Northwestern Army (Estonia) Estonian Defence Forces; Olonets Volunteer Army; British Baltic Fleet	Red Army; 7th Army; 15th Army

Strength
18,500; 6,000 around 2,000	40,000

The Battle of Petrograd was a campaign started in 1919 by the White movement to capture the city of Petrograd (present-day Saint Petersburg). The city held significant value for the Bolsheviks, as it was the same city in which the October Revolution had taken place. The battle coincided with the White Army's campaign to capture Moscow.

The newly formed Northwestern Army launched an attack from Narva, on the eastern edge of Estonian territory, and drove toward Petrograd. The White Army saw a string of victories on the road to Petrograd. After the White advance severed a railroad junction from Pskov to Petrograd, the Bolsheviks began to fear that the city would soon fall. Trotsky personally traveled to Petrograd to rally the city's defenses, and a rail line through Tosno brought in supplies and reinforcements from Moscow.

The advance was repelled, and soon the Whites were forced to retreat west towards Estonia. The Estonian government refused to allow the Northwestern Army to enter their territory, as they had recently reopened negotiations with the Soviet Russia on a peace treaty that would conclude the Estonian War of Independence. The army was interned by the Estonians and disbanded, and the new government of the Russian State collapsed. The dissolution of the Northwestern Army ended any chances of the Whites capturing Petrograd from the Bolsheviks.

== Background ==
On August 8, 1919, the Bolsheviks promised that they would recognize Estonian independence on the condition that the Estonian Army withdraw from Pskov. The leaders of the White Army began their own negotiations around recognizing Estonian independence, but they became increasingly concerned that the Estonian government would forcibly evacuate them to make peace with the Reds. After the Red Army captured Pskov, the Whites concluded that they needed to march on Petrograd in order to have a base of operations on the Baltic coast.

== Battle ==
=== White Army offensive ===
On September 28, 1919, the White Northwestern Army, commanded by Yudenich, launched the offensive. Within the week, they had taken Luga and cut the railroad connection from Pskov to Petrograd. By October 11th, the main force had captured Iamburg. An advance force took Pulkovo Heights on October 20, on the edge of the suburbs of Petrograd. The 3rd Infantry Division of the Army ignored orders to cut the Moscow-Petrograd railway at Tosno in an attempt to be the first to reach Petrograd.

=== Red Army counteroffensive ===
Trotsky traveled north to the city in an effort to rally a defense. The railway junction at Tosno, which the Red Army still held, allowed supplies to be sent to the defenders from Moscow. On October 21, the Red Army counter-attacked, pushing the Whites back from Pulkovo. The Red Army retook Tsarskoe Selo and Pavlovsk two days later. After the assault was repelled, the 7th Army attacked from the east while the 15th Army attacked from the south. Red forces recaptured Luga on October 31, and then the two armies connected southeast of Iamburg on November 7th.

== Aftermath ==
After the counterattacks by the 7th and 15th Red Armies, the Northwestern Army was severely weakened. Estonia, which did not want to jeopardize the ongoing peace negotiations, refused to take in the White Army as refugees, preventing them from taking shelter in Narva. After several pleas, the Estonian government agreed to take in small groups, provided that they would be unarmed and not wearing the uniform of the Northwestern Army. The Regional Government of Northwest Russia ceased to exist on December 5. With nowhere left to retreat, the remnants of the White Army disbanded or surrendered.

Trotsky was later awarded the Order of the Red Banner for his personal role in organizing the defense of Petrograd.

== See also ==
- Bibliography of the Russian Revolution and Civil War
- Outline of the Russian Revolution and Civil War
- Index of articles related to the Russian Revolution and Civil War
- The "Russian" Civil Wars, 1916–1926: Ten Years That Shook the World
- Russia in Flames: War, Revolution, Civil War, 1914–1921
- Russia in Revolution: An Empire in Crisis, 1890 to 1928
- Russia: Revolution and Civil War, 1917—1921
- The Russian Revolution: A New History
