= Diocese of Barnaul =

Diocese of the Russian Orthodox Church

Diocese of Barnaul Барнаульская епархия
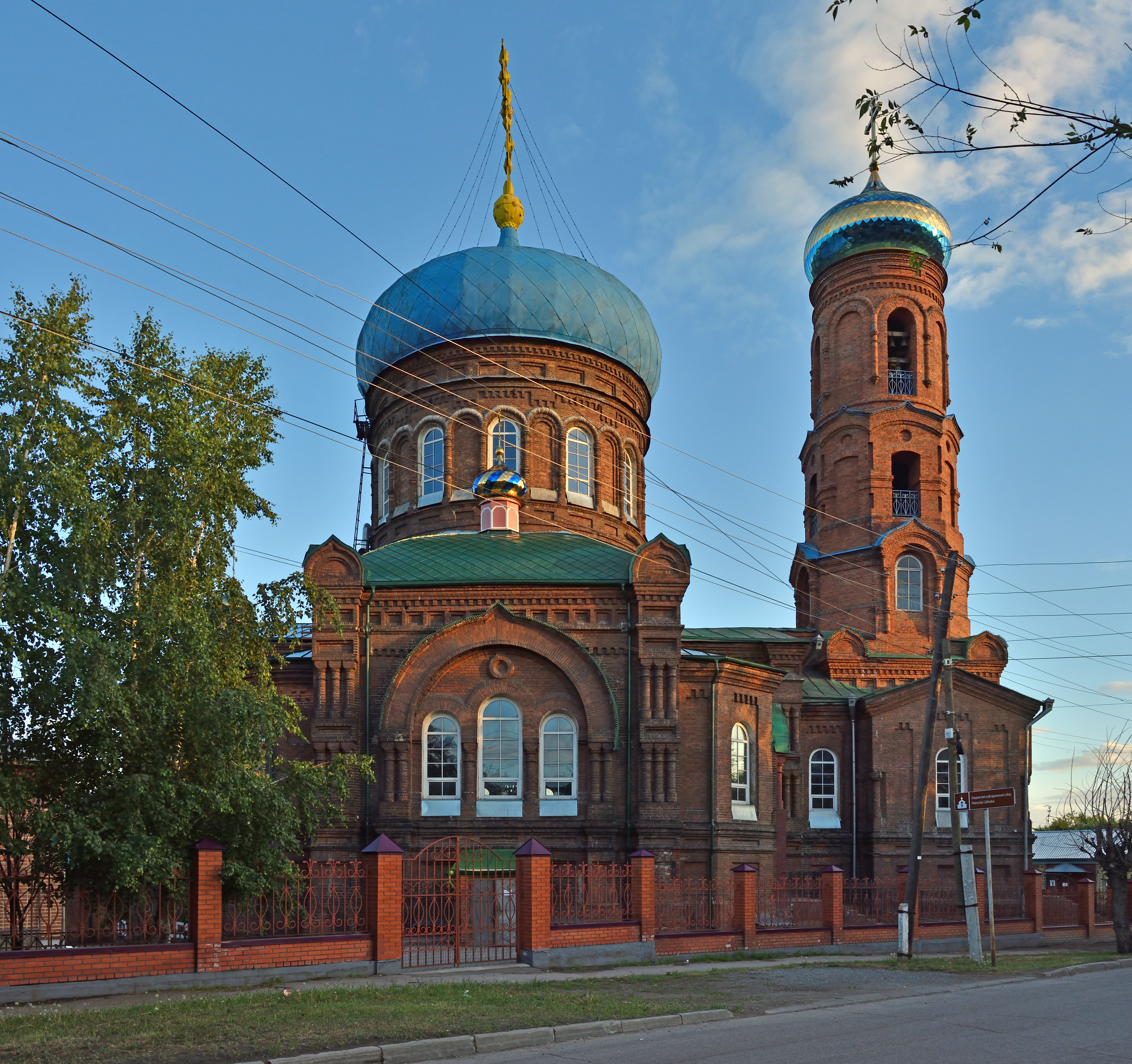

Location
- Deaneries: 6
- Headquarters: Barnaul

Information
- Denomination: Eastern Orthodox
- Sui iuris church: Russian Orthodox Church
- Established: 1930; 26 February 1994
- Cathedral: Saint Elijah Cathedral
- Language: Church Slavonic

Current leadership
- Governance: Eparchy
- Bishop: Sergey Ivannikov since 29 May 2013

Website
- altayskaya-mitropolia.ru

The Diocese of Barnaul (Russian: Барнаульская епархия) is a diocese (eparchy) of the Russian Orthodox Church, uniting parishes and monasteries in the northeastern part of the Altai Krai (within the borders of the cities of Barnaul and Novoaltaysk, as well as Zalesovsky, Zarinsky, Kosikhinsky, Kytmanovsky, Pervomaisky, Talmensky and Togulsky District districts). It is part of the Altai Metropolitanate.

== History ==
The first wooden churches - in the name of the apostles Peter and Paul in the Beloyarsk fortress and Barnaul, in honor of the Resurrection of Christ in the village of the Kolyvan stone-cutting factory appeared in the first half of the 18th century and were subordinate to the ruling bishop of the Tobolsk diocese.

On October 17, 1908, at the request of Archbishop Macarius (Nevsky) of Tomsk, the Barnaul Vicariate of the Tomsk Diocese was established. The residence of the bishop was the Tomsk Alekseevsky Monastery.

On August 19, 1920, the Holy Synod issued a determination to retired Metropolitan Macarius (Nevsky) to be Metropolitan of Altai for life, of which Patriarch Tikhon notified him in a personal letter

Metropolitan Macarius (Nevsky) ruled the Altai flock from the Nikolo-Ugreshsky Monastery near Moscow, where he lived until 1925. Saint Macarius (Nevsky), Metropolitan of Altai died on March 1, 1926.

After the revolution of 1917, the activities of the spiritual mission were discontinued, most parishes, schools, and libraries ceased to exist. In the 1920s and 1930s, all monasteries, missionary camps, and chapels were closed, the majority were ruined and destroyed.

In 1924–1929, the vicariate was part of the Novosibirsk and Barnaul diocese.

In 1930, an independent Barnaul diocese was formed, headed by Bishop Alexander (Bialozor), but in 1938 the diocese was abolished, and its parishes became part of the Novosibirsk diocese.

The second time the mass closure of churches on the territory of the Barnaul diocese occurred during the Khrushchev anti-religious campaign. If in 1958 there were 11 churches in the Altai Territory, then in 1962 there were only three left

On February 26, 1994, the independent Barnaul diocese was revived by the decision of the Holy Synod of the Russian Orthodox Church, which separated it from the Diocese of Novosibirsk On March 19, Anthony (Masendich) was consecrated Bishop of Barnaul and Altai.

From January 20, 2002, to May 29, 2013, the diocese was ruled by Bishop Maxim (Dmitriev).

On May 29, 2013, it became known that the Barnaul see would be headed by a new administrator: "The Synod determined that the Most Reverend Bishop of Kamensk and Alapaevsk Sergius would be the Most Reverend Bishop of Kamensk and Alapaevsk with his release from the management of the Kamensk diocese".

On July 16, 2013, by the decision of the Holy Synod, Abbot Roman (Kornev), abbot of the Kazan Monastery of the Barnaul Diocese, was elected vicar of the Barnaul Diocese with the title Rubtsovsky.

On October 2, 2013, by decision of the Holy Synod, the Gorno-Altai Diocese, formed within the administrative boundaries of the Altai Republic, was separated from the Barnaul diocese.

On May 5, 2015, the independent Biysk, Rubtsovsk and Slavgorod dioceses were separated from the diocese, after which the city districts of Barnaul, Novoaltaysk, as well as Zalesovsky, Zarinsky, Kosikhinsky, Kytmanovsky, Pervomaisky, Talmensky, Togulsky districts of the Altai Krai remained under the jurisdiction of the Barnaul Diocese. At the same time, the Barnaul diocese was determined to be the center of the newly established Altai Metropolis.

The Barnaul Orthodox Theological Seminary operates under the diocesan administration.

== Former bishops ==
=== Barnaul Vicariate ===
Bishop Melety (Zaborovsky) (November 21, 1908 - February 23, 1912) Bishop Euthymius (Lapin) (March 18, 1912 - January 26, 1916) Bishop Gabriel (Voevodin) (January 26, 1916 - 1919) Bishop Victor (Epiphany) (August 3, 1921 - 1924) Bishop Nikodim (Voskresensky) (December 4, 1924 - 1925) Bishop Vladimir (Yudenich) (April 2, 1927 - 1930)

=== Barnaul diocese ===
- Bishop Alexander (Bialozor) (1930 - April 1931)
- Bishop Herman (Kokkel) (September - December 1931)
- Bishop Tarasiy (Livanov) (December 1931 - November 1932)
- Bishop Jacob (Maskaev) (April 4, 1933 - February 11, 1937)
- Bishop Gregory (Kozyrev) (February 11 - September 2, 1937)
- 1943-1994 - the territory of the Barnaul diocese was part of the Novosibirsk Diocese.
- Bishop Anthony (Masendic) (March 19, 1994 - July 8, 2001)
- Bishop Maxim (Dmitriev) (January 20, 2002 - May 29, 2013)
- Bishop Sergius (Ivannikov) (since May 29, 2013)

== Deaneries ==
- Barnaul city deanery
- Barnaul suburban deanery
- Beloyarsk deanery
- Zarinsky deanery
- Talmen deanery
- Monastic deanery
