= Fyodor Ostashenko =

Belarusian Soviet lieutenant general (1896–1976)

Fyodor Afanasyevich Ostashenko
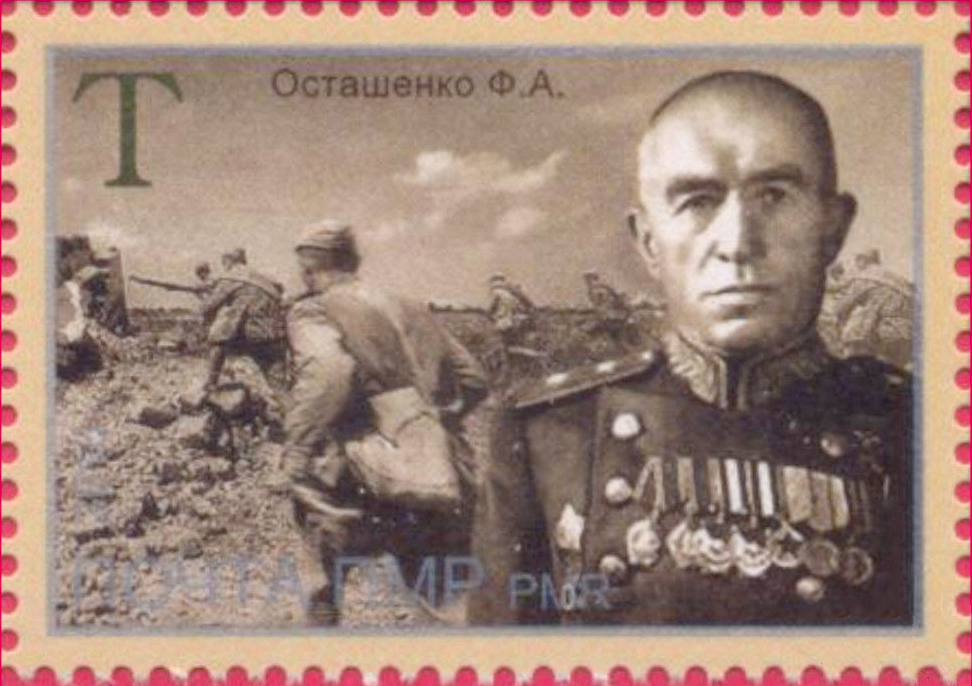
- Fyodor Ostashenko on a 2016 stamp of Transnistria
- Born: 19 June 1896; Bolshaya Lyubshchina, Yanovichskoy volost, Vitebsky Uyezd, Vitebsk Governorate, Russian Empire
- Died: 27 October 1976 (aged 80) Moscow, Soviet Union
- Buried: Vagankovo Cemetery
- Allegiance: Russian Empire; Russian SFSR; Soviet Union
- Branch: Imperial Russian Army; Red Army (later Soviet Army)
- Service years: 1915–1918; 1919–1923; 1923–1956
- Rank: Lieutenant general
- Commands: 6th Rifle Division (acting); 368th Rifle Division; 35th Guards Rifle Division; 47th Guards Rifle Division; 57th Rifle Corps; 25th Guards Rifle Corps
- Conflicts: World War I; Russian Civil War; Polish–Soviet War; World War II
- Awards: Hero of the Soviet Union; Order of Lenin (2); Order of the Red Banner (3); Order of Suvorov, 2nd class; Order of the Patriotic War, 1st class

Fyodor Afanasyevich Ostashenko (Russian: Фёдор Афанасьевич Осташенко; 19 June 1896 – 27 October 1976) was a Belarusian Soviet Army lieutenant general and a Hero of the Soviet Union.

Drafted into the Imperial Russian Army during World War I, Ostashenko served with the Southwestern Front between 1916 and 1917 and was demobilized in early 1918. Returning to his home area, he joined the Red Army, serving as a political worker and then as a junior commander during the Russian Civil War and Polish–Soviet War. After the end of the war, between 1922 and 1923, he was arrested on charges of aiding deserters, but after a suspended sentence was ultimately reinstated in the Red Army. Ostashenko served in command and staff positions during the interwar period and when Operation Barbarossa began in June 1941 was deputy commander of the 6th Rifle Division. After the division suffered heavy losses in the opening days of the war Ostashenko became acting commander before being transferred to command the 368th Rifle Division in September.

Having spent much of 1942 in a course at the Voroshilov Higher Military Academy, he briefly took command of the 35th Guards Rifle Division during the Battle of Stalingrad before transferring to lead the 47th Guards Rifle Division in 1943. Ostashenko commanded the 57th Rifle Corps from early 1944 and was made a Hero of the Soviet Union for his leadership of it in two crossings of the Tisza during the Budapest Offensive in October and November. In the final months of the war and early postwar period he commanded the 25th Guards Rifle Corps. After serving as an instructor at the Voroshilov Higher Military Academy from the late 1940s, Ostashenko was dismissed from service in 1956.

== Early life, World War I and Russian Civil War ==
Ostashenko was born on 19 June 1896 in the village of Bolshaya Lyubshchina, Yanovichskoy volost, Vitebsky Uyezd, Vitebsk Governorate to a peasant family. He graduated from four grades at a gymnasium. During World War I, he was mobilized for military service on 7 August 1915, being sent to the 4th Company of the Reserve Battalion of the Petrograd Lifeguard Regiment in Petrograd. With the battalion, he fought with the Southwestern Front between July 1916 and February 1917, then returned to Petrograd before being demobilized on 13 March 1918. In July, he volunteered for the Red Army, serving in the Vitebsky Uyezd military commissariat as a clerk and instructor organizer. From May 1919 Ostashenko served as a Red Army man and political soldier – a Communist mobilized to conduct political work in the army – in the march battalion of the Vitebsk Reserve Regiment. From July he served as an assistant platoon commander in the 84th Rifle Regiment of the 10th Rifle Division, which fought against the Northwestern Army near Petrograd as part of the 15th Army of the Western Front. He entered the Smolensk Commanders' Infantry Courses in November and upon graduation in June 1920 became a platoon commander in the Rzhev-based 2nd Reserve Regiment. This assignment proved to be brief and a month later, Ostashenko became adjutant of the 4th Landing Detachment for armored trains with the Western Front. He fought with the detachment, which provided landing parties for armored trains, in the Polish–Soviet War and was wounded twice.

== Interwar period ==
After the end of the war, from February 1921, Ostashenko served as a company commander and acting head of the regimental troops in the Vitebsk Territorial Regiment. He became adjutant to the commander of the Vitebsk Governorate CHON in November, but was arrested by the GPU in Vitebsk during April 1922 for "illegally issuing two vacation tickets, contributing to the desertion of two servicemen". Sentenced by a military tribunal in October to a one-year suspended sentence, Ostashenko was released in December and placed at the disposal of the Vitebsk Governorate military commissariat. Dismissed from the Red Army in May 1923, he was again drafted into the cadre of the Red Army in July and sent to the 79th Rifle Regiment in Vitebsk, with which he served as senior and assistant chief of economic troops, assistant chief of the regimental machine gun troops, assistant chief and acting chief of the regimental school, and as an assistant company commander. In July 1925 he became a company commander in the 190th Rifle Regiment in Smolensk. From September 1926 he was a company commander and student in the mid-level commanders' refresher courses at the Ashenbrenner Moscow Infantry School and upon graduation in August 1927 continued to serve as a company commander and head of the regimental school in the 190th Regiment. From April 1929, he was a battalion commander in the 15th Rifle Regiment in Polotsk. Ostashenko served as assistant chief of the 2rd and 2nd sectors of the 2nd staff department in the Belorussian Military District headquarters, and in March 1933 became chief of the 2nd staff department. He became chief of the 2nd division of the 4th staff department in February 1935. A colonel by December 1937, when he was sent to the Vystrel course, Ostashenko became assistant commander of the 52nd Rifle Division in Mozyr upon graduation in September 1938. A year later, he was appointed commandant of the Mozyr Fortified Region, and in September 1940 Ostashenko became deputy commander of the 6th Rifle Division of the Western Special Military District.

== World War II ==
Ostashenko still held this position when Operation Barbarossa, the German invasion of the Soviet Union, began in June 1941. As part of the 28th Rifle Corps of the 4th Army of the Western Front, the 6th fought in defensive battles on the Brest and Bobruisk directions. At the beginning of July with the corps its remnants were withdrawn to the front reserve, around which time he became temporary division commander. The division was rebuilt and subsequently fought in defensive battles on the left bank of the Sozh River near Propoysk. Appointed commander of the 368th Rifle Division, initially in the Siberian Military District and later with the 7th Separate Army in the Reserve of the Supreme High Command, on 23 September, Ostashenko entered the accelerated course at the Voroshilov Higher Military Academy around 10 June 1942. Upon graduation in November, he was appointed commander of the 35th Guards Rifle Division between 21 November and 6 December, but instead became commander of the 47th Guards Rifle Division of the 5th Tank Army (used to reform the 12th Army in April 1943) on 20 December; he was simultaneously promoted to major general. Under his command, the 47th Guards fought in the Battle of Stalingrad, during which they helped to encircle and destroy the German 6th Army west of Stalingrad. Subsequently, as part of the 12th Army, now part of the Southwestern Front, the division fought in the Donbass Strategic Offensive. For his leadership of the division in the latter, Ostashenko received the Order of the Red Banner.

From December, Ostashenko commanded the 57th Rifle Corps, which served with the 37th and 53rd Armies of the 2nd Ukrainian Front, participating in the attack towards Krivoy Rog. In January 1944, the corps, with the 37th Army, was transferred to the 3rd Ukrainian Front, fighting in offensives to recapture southwestern Ukraine. During the Nikopol–Krivoi Rog, Bereznegovatoye–Snigeryovka, and Odessa Offensives, Ostashenko led the corps in a 350-kilometer advance, crossing the Inhul, the Southern Bug, and the Dniester. After the corps returned to the 53rd Army, now with the 2nd Ukrainian Front, he led it in the October Budapest Offensive, the capture of Tiraspol, Eger, and settlements and fortified points in Ukraine, Czechoslovakia, and Hungary. During the Budapest Offensive, units of the corps crossed the Tisza and captured a bridgehead. The 7th Guards Army was sent into the bridgehead, and the 57th Rifle Corps itself was transferred to another sector, from which it recrossed the Tisza on 7 November, capturing a 30-kilometer deep bridgehead by 11 November. Ostashenko was transferred to command the 25th Guards Rifle Corps of the front's 7th Guards Army on 19 March 1945. He led it in the Bratislava–Brno Offensive, capturing Senec and Bratislava. By 15 April, the corps had captured several cities and completed the capture of Slovakia. For his "courage and determination" in the Budapest Offensive, Ostashenko was made a Hero of the Soviet Union and awarded the Order of Lenin on 28 April, eight days after a promotion to lieutenant general. In early May, the corps ended the war with the army in the Prague Offensive.

== Postwar ==
After the end of the war, Ostashenko continued to command the corps. He studied at the Higher Academic Courses at the Voroshilov Higher Military Academy from March 1947, graduating with honors in April 1948. After becoming a senior instructor at the academy in June, Ostashenko was granted the rights of a graduate of it in December 1951. Dismissed from service in October 1956, he died in Moscow on 27 October 1976 and was buried at the Vagankovo Cemetery.

== Awards and honors ==
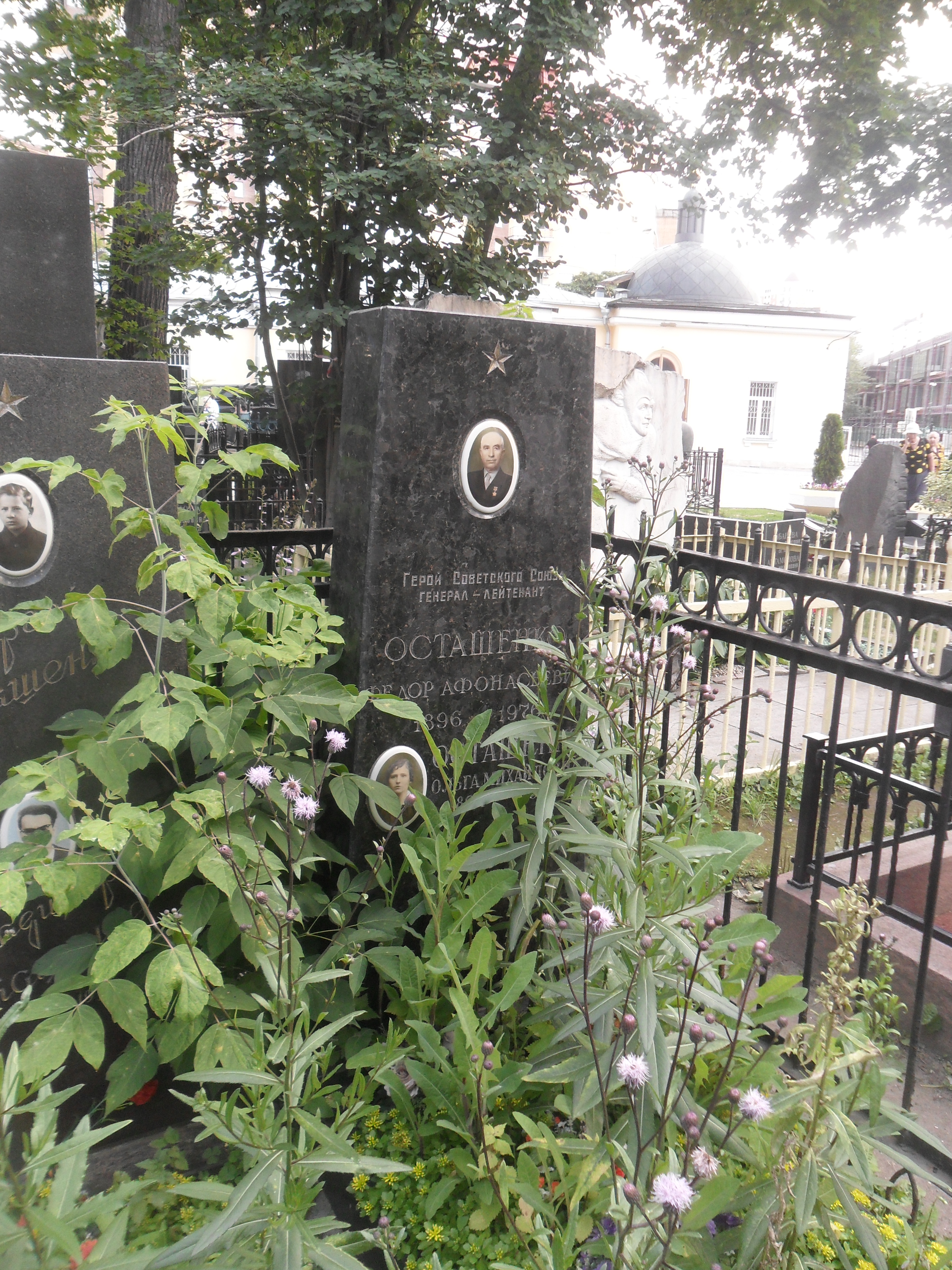
Grave of Ostashenko at the Vagankovo Cemetery

Ostashenko was a recipient of the following decorations:

- Hero of the Soviet Union
- Order of Lenin (2)
- Order of the Red Banner (3)
- Order of Suvorov, 2nd class
- Order of the Patriotic War, 1st class

Ostashenko was made an honorary citizen of Tiraspol in 1969 and one of its streets was named for him in 1976.
