= Dmitry Nadyozhny =

Russian general (1873–1945)

Dmitri Nikolayevitch Nadyozhny
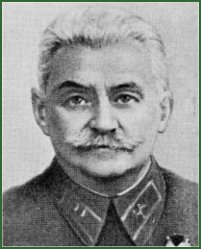
- Born: 5 November [O.S. 24 October] 1873; Nizhny Novgorod, Russian Empire
- Died: 22 February 1945 (aged 71); Moscow, USSR
- Burial place: Moscow
- Relatives: Nikolai Nadyozhny (father)
- Military career
- Allegiance: Russia (1892–1917); USSR (1918–1942)
- Branch: Imperial Russian Army; Red Army
- Service years: 1892–1942
- Rank: Lieutenant General
- Nickname: "Reliable"
- Commands: 10th Infantry Division (Russian Empire); Northern Front (RSFSR); 2nd Rifle Corps
- Conflicts: Russo-Japanese War; World War I Russian Civil War; World War II
- Awards: Order of St George; Order of the Red Banner
- Other work: Instructor at the SM Kirov academy

Dmitry Nikolayevich Nadyozhny (Russian: Дмитрий Николаевич Надёжный; 5 November [O.S. 24 October] 1873, Nizhny Novgorod – 22 February 1945, Moscow) was a commander in the Russian Imperial Army who later joined the Red Army. He rose to lieutenant general and fought in the First World War and Russian Civil War, commanding the Red Army's northern front in the latter.

== Early life ==
Nadyozhny was born into a noble family from Nizhny Novgorod and graduated from the 1st Military Pavolvsky School in 1892. He was commissioned as a Lieutenant in the 14th Georgian grenadier regiment, and later transferred to the 10th Siberian Rifles. During the Russo-Japanese War he served as a staff captain and was awarded the Order of St George. Shortly before the outbreak of World War I he was a military adviser in Mongolia.

== World War I ==
When the war began, Nadyozhny was assigned command of the 40th Kolyvan Infantry Regiment. In 1915 he was promoted to Major General, and by 1916 he was chief of staff to the 69th Infantry Regiment.

== Russian Civil War ==
Nadyozhny joined the Red Army in early 1918 and served as chief of defense for the Finland military district. As commander of the Northern Front, he led the Red Army to victory against the White Army and its Western allies at the Battle of Shenkursk. In 1919 he was awarded the Order of the Red Banner for the defense of Petrograd at the head of the 7th Army, against the forces of Yudenich. From 1921 to 1924 Nadyozhny was deputy chief inspector to the Red Army.

== Arrest ==
In January 1931 he was arrested during the 'Spring Case,' dismissed from the service, and sentenced to imprisonment in Sverdlovsk, Russia for five years. He was released in 1932 and reinstated in the Red Army.

== World War II ==
From 1933 to 1942, Nadyozhny taught at the Kirov Military Medical Academy. He was promoted to Lieutenant General in 1940, and was evacuated to Samarkand when the Germans threatened Moscow. He retired in 1942 and died in Moscow in 1945.

== Bibliography ==
- Biography of Nadyozhny
