= Curtain forces =

Soviet Russian defensive troops (1918)

Curtain forces (Russian: Отряды завесы, войска завесы, завеса) were military forces, created soon after the signing of the Treaty of Brest-Litovsk by Soviet Russia in 1918, to protect the inner regions of the state and initially served as border troops. They were created by the directive No.72 of Higher Military Council on March 5, 1918.

== History ==
The Curtain was a defense system created according to the March 5, 1918 directive of the Revolutionary Military Council to guard "the interior regions of the state against possible invasion of Germans" and for guarding the demarcation line established by the Brest Peace Treaty. It was composed of groups of military forces that were organized on a voluntary basis. The Russian Army officers developed the concept of the Curtain during its efforts to defend Petrograd against the February 1918 German offensive initiated by Erich Ludendorff. The Curtain was deployed during the period marked by the collapse of the former Imperial Russian Army and the Red Army was just being formed. After initial German successes, in early March a mixture of Red Guards, Red Army, volunteer and partisan forces stabilized the line along the Narva and Dnieper rivers; they formed the beginning of the Curtain. The Western and Northern curtains were established in places of the former Russian Empire's Western and Northern Fronts, respectively.

=== Western Curtain ===
The Western Curtain (official name: Western Region of Curtain Forces, Russian: Западный участок отрядов завесы (ЗУОЗ)) was established on March 29, 1918, according to the March 5 directive of the Supreme Military Council. It stretched from Nevel to Novy Oskol, to protect Moscow, under the command of V.N. Yegoryev.

=== Northern Curtain ===
The Northern Section of the Screen Detachments was created on March 5 and disbanded on September 11, 1918.

=== Northeastern Curtain ===
The Northeastern Region of Curtain Forces (Сев.-Вост. участок отрядов завесы) was created by the August 6, 1918 directive of the Supreme Military Council, to protect against Allied intervention and White Russian forces from the White Sea and Ural directions.

=== Southern Curtain ===
The Southern Region of Curtain Forces was created by the August 11, 1918 directive of the Supreme Military Council.

=== Disbanding ===
The Curtain was disbanded by a September 11, 1918 Decree of the Revolutionary Military Council, which established Fronts, as well as the Western Defense Region in place of it.
