= Yevgeni Iskritsky =

Russian and Soviet general (1874–1949)

Yevgeni Andreyevich Iskritsky
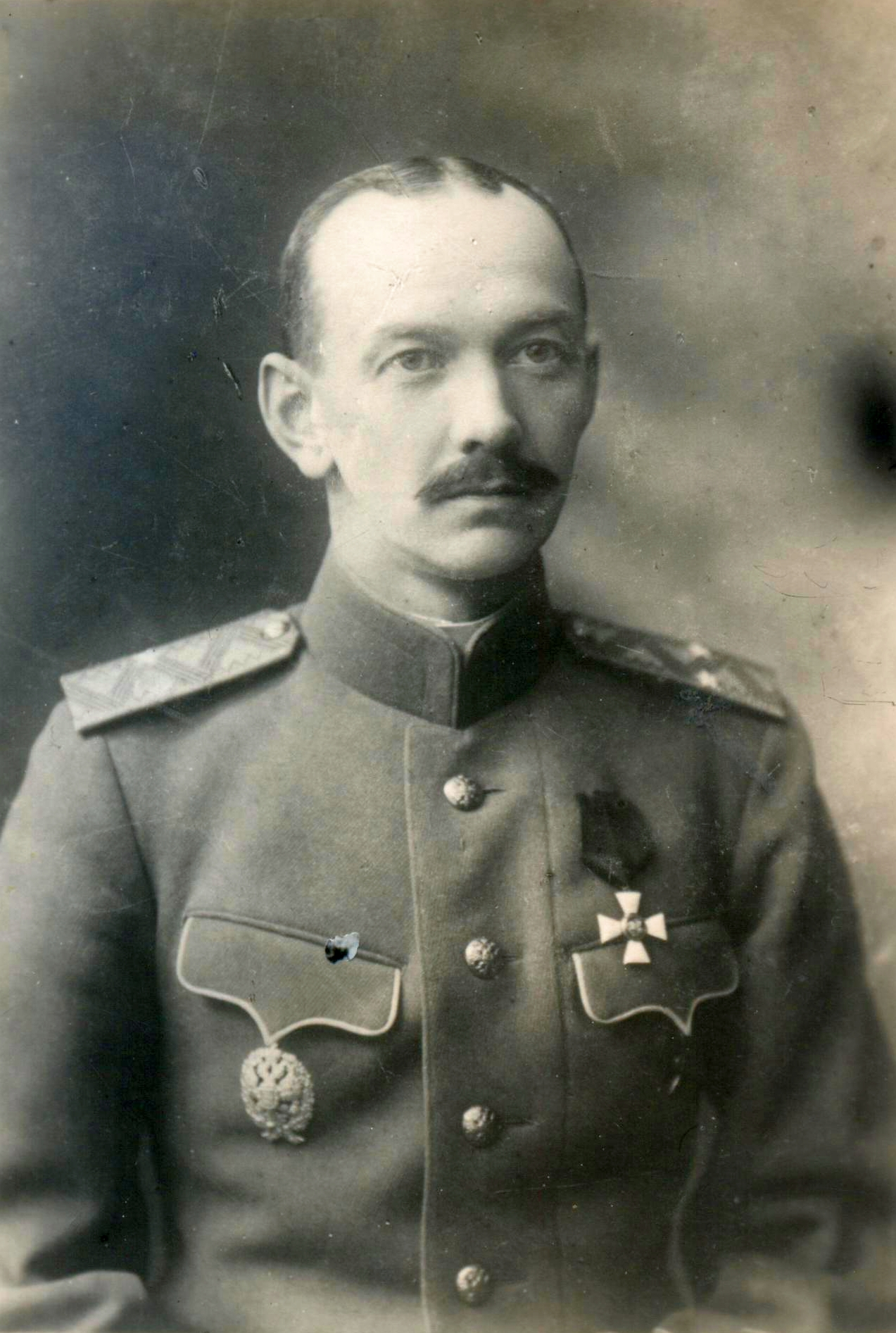
- Iskritsky in 1915
- Born: August 15, 1874; Starodub, Chernigov Governorate, Russian Empire
- Died: July 27, 1949 (aged 74) Shymkent, Kazakh SSR, Soviet Union
- Branch: Russian Imperial Army; Soviet Army
- Service years: Russian Empire 1890–1918; Soviet Union 1918–1929
- Rank: Lieutenant general
- Commands: Russian Imperial Army: 148th infantry Caspian regiment; Life Guards Pavlovsky regiment; Chief of Staff 9th army corps; 37th Infantry Division; 1st Siberian Army Corps; Red Army: 2nd Novgorod Infantry Division; 7th Army
- Conflicts: Second Balkan War; World War I Russian Civil War

Yevgeni Andreyevich Iskritsky (Russian: Евгений Андреевич Искрицкий; Ukrainian: Євгеній Андрійович Іскрицький; August 15, 1874 – July 27, 1949) was a Russian and Soviet military commander, author, teacher, a hero of the First World War, lieutenant general in the Imperial Russian army, who fell in with the winning side in the Russian Civil War yet was still a victim of Stalin's purges.

== Biography ==
Yevgeni Andreyevich Iskritsky was born in 1874 in Starodub, Chernigov province, Russian Empire. He graduated from First Cadet Corps and advanced to the 1st Pavlovsk military college. He received his commission in 1892 as a Lieutenant in the 11th. Lifeguards 3 Artillery Brigade and Artillery Guards Rifle Division. In 1899, he graduated from Nikolaev General Staff Academy at the top of his class. In 1900–1901 he was a teacher of tactics and military history in Alexeyev military school. He served in the Propertied Command Company in the 12th Astrakhan Grenadier Regiment, as a senior aide in the headquarters of the 3rd Grenadier Division, as an assistant adjutant for the Senior Staff of the Moscow Military District, as Assistant Clerk for the Quartermaster-General of the Chief of Staff, as the Chief Clerk of the General Staff, and as staff officer for special assignments for the commander of the Moscow Military District. His first command came as the head of the 50th Infantry Regiment Bialystok. On January 14, 1911, was appointed as a military adviser to Romania. The political situation in the Balkans was very intense and the First Balkan War began in 1912, during which the Ottoman Empire lost almost the entire European territory (Romania did not take part in it). Newly formed countries were unable to amicably divide the former Turkish lands and the Second Balkan War began in June 1913. Bulgaria attacked its former allies: Serbia, Greece and Montenegro. The Ottoman Empire and Romania were on their side against Bulgaria, which was quickly crushed. During the Second Balkan War Iskritsky remained with the Romanian army and in July to August 1913 participated in the campaign in Bulgaria, for which he was awarded the Order of St. Anna and two Romanian medals. After returning to Russia, August 19, 1913, he was appointed Chief of the Military Science Archive and General Staff library, but soon returned to a field position with the 148th Infantry regiment of the Caspian.

== First World War ==
At the beginning of First World War 148th Infantry Regiment was included in the 37th Infantry Division of the 18th army corps in the 9th army and was stationed on Southwestern front. As commander of a regiment in August–September 1914 Iskritsky participated in the Battle of Galicia. In late August, the regiment has not yet completed redeployment, so they joined the battle in Opole under Lublin, covering the concentration of forces being moved to the right flank of the front of the 18th Army Corps. On August 21 the Russian army began a general offensive, and the regiment crossed the river Hodel, knocked Austrian forces from their positions and captured Skakuv, and then began to give chase to a retreating enemy. In Zaleszany Iskritsky was wounded by a bullet in the nose, but continued to lead the fight. Iskritsky was awarded the Order of St. Vladimir 4th:

Because a number of fights, administered by a division 21, 23, 24, 25 and 26 August and on 1 and 2 September 1914 showed exceptional courage and energy to leading the attack height. 107.5, 21 August, the mastery of the ferry on the river. Hodel at the village. Budzyn, a night attack on the position of the Austrians Godowsky and defense positions near the village.

During the Battle of the Vistula River, in September 1914, part of the German 9th Army launched an attack on Warsaw and Ivanogorod. Iskritsky commanded the rear guard of the 37th Infantry Division as part of 148th Regiment Kaspiyskiyskogo, hundreds of Orenburg Cossacks, and an artillery brigade. The German attacks failed and began a general retreat, so the Russian army went on the offensive. The 148th regiment was advancing in the forefront with the Caspian 37th Division on the Sandomierz. On October 23, the 148th Regiment, under the cover of artillery, crossed the Vistula River and strengthened it on the left bank, in the meantime, Russian troops seized the Sandomierz. In contrast Sandomierz Austrians still hold beachhead on the right bank of the Vistula, you can create a threat to the flank of the 37th Division. To eliminate the bridgehead division commander Andrew Medardovich Zaionchkovskii formed the Sandomierz detachment under the command of Iskritsky, which consisted of 145th Novocherkassk Regiment, 148th Regiment of the Caspian and the four divisional artillery batteries, the vanguard detachment amounted to 2 battalion of the Caspian shelf, and a platoon of sappers. In late October, a detachment of the enemy beachhead eliminated. During the fighting on the Vistula, Iskritsky was awarded the Order of St. Vladimir 3rd. Iskritsky year was appointed commander of the Pavlovsky Regiment. The regiment was part of the 2nd Brigade 2nd Guards Infantry Division 1st Guards Corps 12th army North-Western front. During the Przasnysz operation at the beginning of February 1915, the Pavlovsky Regiment was transferred under the Łomża. The first battalion of the regiment in the bayonets took Kastanovo. On the morning of February 9 the Germans launched an offensive east of Jedwabne. Suffering heavy losses, up to several hundred people a day, the regiment held the position to delay the German offensive and wear down their counterattacks. During the fighting at Jedwabne, Iskritsky was awarded the Order of St. Stanislaus 1st Class with Swords and was promotion to major general with the statement in the post. At the end of June 1915, the North-Western Front conducted defensive operations in Prasnysha area. The Germans decided to strike, to encircle and destroy the Russian army in Poland. The commander of the North-Western Front Mikhail Alekseev saw the threat and though the environment was right to withdraw the Russian armies. In July 1915, Pavlovsky Regiment led continuous cover battles and suffered heavy losses, but the other Russian armies were able to withdraw without losses. Iskritsky was awarded the Order of St. George grade 4

Because commanded the vanguard, on July 22–23, 1915 at the village. Vereschina with a small force and in difficult terrain conditions, in spite of the heavy fire of the enemy, the constant attacks and the huge losses of the regiment, he kept defenses and made it possible to withdraw the troops and the many logistical institutions.

In August 1915, Nicholas II assumed the title of Supreme Commander, August 22, 1915, and he appointed Iskritsky Chief of Logistics for the General Staff. At command headquarters, Iskritsky participated in the development of operations and the organization of interaction of all fronts. Iskritsky was responsible for the inspection of parts, infantry reinforcements, horses, weapons, uniforms, baggage, engineering equipment, communications equipment, as well as for training, and other sanitary unit. In January 1916 Iskritsky was awarded the Order of St. Anna 1st Class with Swords. On February 29, 1916, Iskritsky was appointed chief of staff of the 9th Army Corps of the 4th Army Western front and led his troops in the Baranovichi Offensive. On July 3, 1917, Iskritsky was appointed commander of the 1st Siberian Army Corps of the 10th Army on the Southwestern Front. The previous commander Mikhail Mikhailovich Pleshkov was removed after a soldier's committee expressed distrust (amongst the soldiers were widespread Bolshevik agitators, they left their positions, refused to obey orders, and often fraternized with the Germans. Iskritsky got the troops in order and the joined the Kerensky Offensive driving back the Germans by 20 km order of the City Council award was awarded the Order of St. George grade 4 with laurel.

On December 15, 1917, an armistice between Soviet Russia and the Central Powers was concluded and fighting stopped, but Iskritsky's 1st Siberian Corps remained a part of the 10th Army to face-off against the Germans. Over Christmas of 1917, the Central Powers released a declaration stating that they were in favor of the separate peace with all the Allies without indemnities and without annexations, provided the peace was immediate and all belligerents took part in the negotiations. Lenin was in favor of signing the agreement immediately. He thought that only an immediate peace would allow the young Bolshevik government to consolidate power in Russia. However, he was virtually alone in this opinion among the Bolsheviks on the Central Committee, they wanted to continue the war while awaiting revolutions in Germany, Austria, Turkey, and Bulgaria.

Frustrated with continued German demands for cessions of territory, Trotsky on February 10 announced a new policy. Russia unilaterally declared an end of hostilities against the Central Powers, and Russia withdrew from peace negotiations with the Central Powers, a position summed up as "no war – no peace".

The consequences for the Bolsheviks were worse than what they had feared in December. The Central Powers repudiated the armistice on February 18, 1918, and in the next fortnight seized most of Ukraine, Belarus, and the Baltic countries in Operation Faustschlag. The 1st Red Guard Brigade of Siberian riflemen under Iskritsky's command attacked positions of German troops on February 23, 1918. Today this date is celebrated by us as Defender of the Fatherland Day. On March 3 Chicherin signed the treaty. Thus the new Soviet government agreed to terms worse than those they had previously rejected.

== Civil War ==
On February 28, 1918 the Council of People's Commissars announced the creation of the Red Army to replace the rapidly disintegrating Imperial Russian Army. Iskritsky voluntarily joined the Red Army, to continue to fight with the Germans. In July 1918 Iskritsky was appointed commander of the 2nd Novgorod Infantry Division. By November 1918, Iskritsky had recreated and led the 7th Russian army on the Northern Front and he commanded the St. Petersburg Military District. On November 22, 1918, in the Battle of Narva the Red Army tried to capture Narva, but were repulsed by the joint actions of the Estonian and German units. After Germany's surrender, and not wanting to take part in the civil war against the army of an independent Estonia and the Russian White Guard regiments caught in the Baltic, Iskritsky left the leadership of the troops and moved to a teaching job.

== Teaching work ==
On April 24, 1919, Iskritsky was appointed professor for 1st Soviet Artillery Command Courses. In 1924 he became a professor of military geography at the Military-Political Academy Tolmachev. He also taught at the Institute of Communications.

== Arrests ==
On October 29, 1929, Iskritsky was arrested during "Case Spring" (see also for Vesna Case), the first of Stalin's purges. During interrogations, he revealed:

During the October Revolution, I met no sympathy, because I did not understand it and thought it did not meet the interests of the Russian people. Strong reasons that prompted me to do so, were the famous order number 1, which I understood as a desire for irresponsible elements destroy the army during the war, and then a strong impression on me was the killing of my relatives and friends. However, for me it was obvious that the process of Bolshevization of Russia was inevitable and that we, the representatives of the old regime, will suffer for being on the wrong side, with all the ensuing consequences ... When I went to work in the Red Army, we had not yet liquidated the German front and, therefore, I considered it possible to continue the fight against the Germans, even in the Red Army. Only after the war took a civil character and plot I formed the army of my opponents with a white hand were people with whom I grew up, was educated and served under the old regime, and that I could consider their enemies, I realized that I did not want to be the commander driving the Red troops and preferred to leave active duty for academics.

Iskritsky was sentenced to 10 years in the Solovki prison camp. After serving two years, Iskritsky was released, and he again taught at a school in Orel. But in 1937, during the Great Purge Iskritsky was again arrested and sentenced to 10 more years. In 1947 Iskritsky was released and deported in Shymkent, Kazakhstan. He died in 1949, having earned 10 Tsarist Russia and Soviet Red Army awards.

== Books ==
- Iskritsky EA, Military statistical description of the Moscow Military District. Vol. 1. Department of Geography and climate review. Moscow. Printing of Staff of the Moscow Military District, (1908).
- Iskritsky EA, Military statistical description of the Moscow Military District. Vol. 2. Department of Highways and dirt roads. Moscow. Printing of Staff of the Moscow Military District, (1909).
- Iskritsky EA. Armed Forces of Romania (According to the data on January 1, 1912). St. Petersburg. Military Typography (1912).
- Bratskaya Pomosha magazine, published by Iskritsky together with other officers of the General Staff 1907
- Voenny Mir magazine, published by Iskritsky 1911–1914
