= Pēteris Slavens =

Latvian military officer

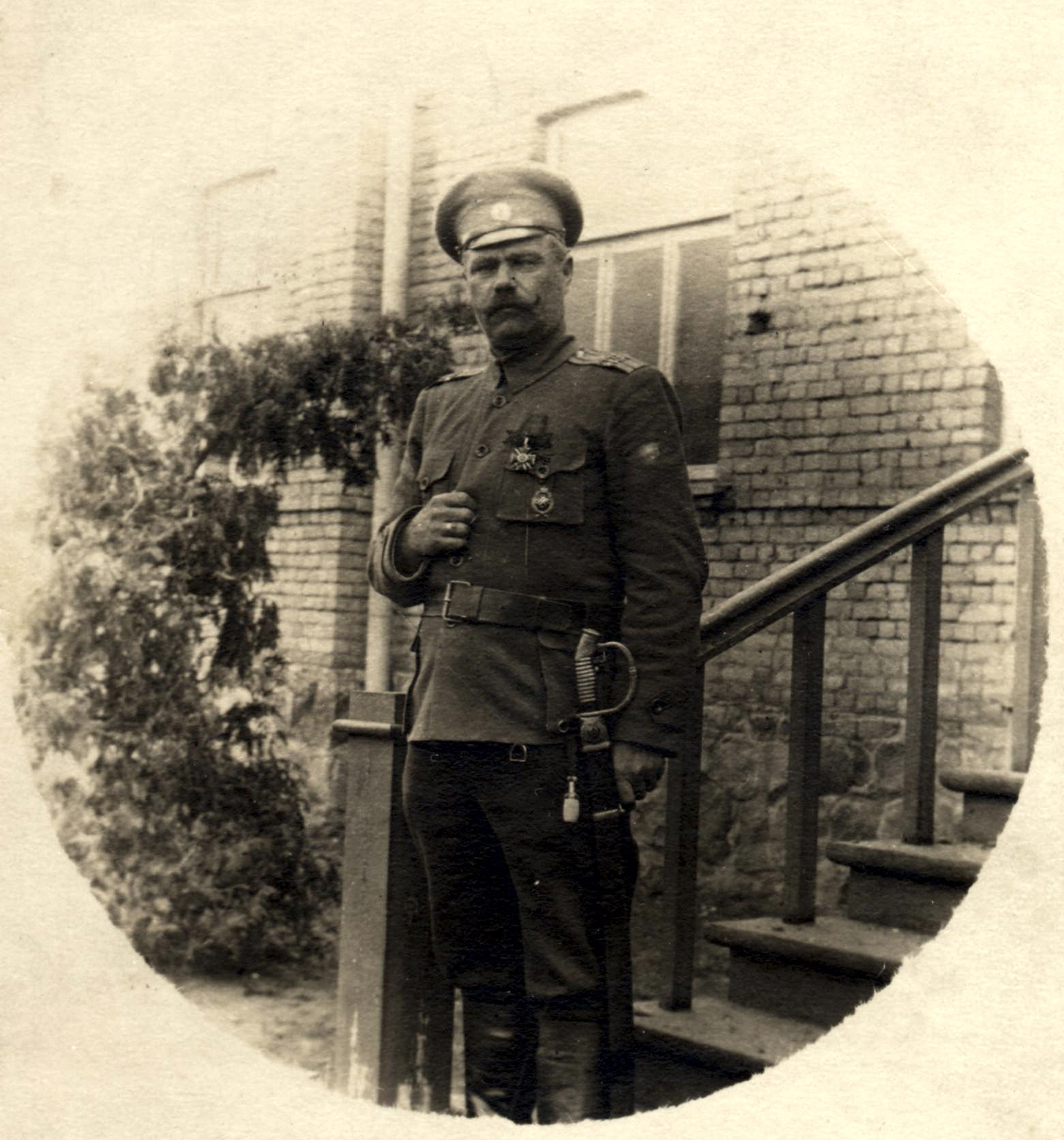
- Native name: Пётр Антонович Славен
- Born: 5 April 1874; Cēsis
- Died: 14 November 1919 (aged 45) Valmiera
- Cause of death: Pneumonia
- Service years: 1914–1917 (Russian Empire); 1918–1919 (Soviet Union
- Rank: Commander

Pēteris Slavens (Russian: Пётр Антонович Славен, romanized: Pyotr Antonovich Slaven; Cēsis, 5 April 1874 – Valmiera, 14 November 1919) was a Latvian Soviet military commander, who fought in the Russian Civil War.

== Military career ==
Slavens attended from 1893 a Junker-school and entered in the Tsarist Army.

In 1917, he retired as a regimental commander for health reasons and was in various hospitals for treatment.
After the October Revolution, he was forcibly re-activated by the Red Army in the summer of 1918, despite his poor health. He commanded first a division, then from August the 5th Army in the East, and until January 1919 the Southern Front in the Russian Civil War.

Because of illness, Slavens went to Riga, where from March he again had to take up the command of the Soviet Latvian Army. He was blamed by the Party leadership for the devastating defeat in May 1919, and court martial investigations were started against him. Slavens received his demobilization for health reasons and then illegally crossed the border into independent Latvia.

The local authorities detained Slavens in November 1919 and put him in a POW camp, where he died in hospital from pneumonia.

== Sources ==
- Inta Pētersone (Hrsg.): Latvijas Brīvības cīņas 1918 - 1920. Enciklopēdja. Preses nams, Riga 1999, ISBN 9984-00-395-7. Seite 399–400
