= 35th Guards Rifle Division =

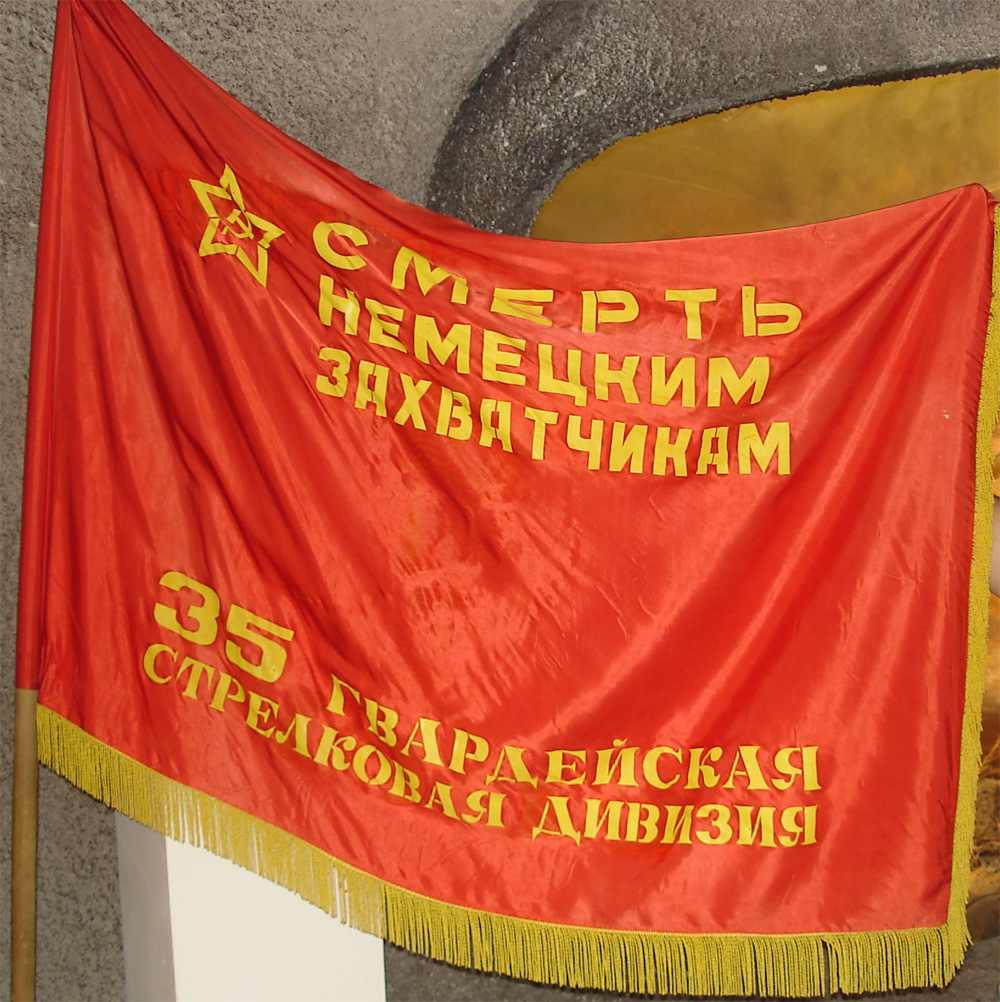
- Battle flag of the 35th Guards Rifle Division
- Active: 1942–1946
- Country: Soviet Union
- Branch: Red Army
- Type: Infantry
- Engagements: World War II; Battle of Stalingrad; Donbas Strategic Offensive; Battle of the Dnieper; Nikopol-Krivoy Rog Offensive; Odessa Offensive; Lublin-Brest Offensive; Vistula-Oder Offensive; Berlin Offensive
- Decorations: Order of the Red Banner; Order of Suvorov, 2nd class; Order of Bogdan Khmelnitsky, 2nd class
- Battle honours: Lozova

Commanders
- Notable commanders: Fyodor Ostashenko

The 35th Guards Rifle Division (Russian: 35-я гвардейская стрелковая дивизия) was a division of the Soviet Red Army in World War II.

Formed from an airborne corps in the summer of 1942, the division fought in the Battle of Stalingrad with the 62nd Army, then served through the war with the 8th Guards Army. It was briefly stationed in Germany postwar before its disbandment in mid-1946.

== World War II ==
In October 1941, in the city Ekgeym (currently Usatovo Krasnokutsky District, Saratov Oblast) Volga Military District was formed the 8th Airborne Corps (corps commander VA Glazkov). It included the 17th Airborne Brigade (brigade commander Makarenko), the 18th Airborne Brigade (commander Gerasimov) and 19th Airborne Brigade (commander Kotliarov). By January 1942 the 8th Airborne Corps was relocated to the Moscow Military District conducted combat training there. In winter and spring 1942 the corps did not participate in fighting.

On July 30, 1942, in connection with a serious complication of the situation on the Soviet-German front, the 8th Airborne Corps was transformed into the 35th Guards Rifle Division, at the same time on the basis of the 17th Airborne Brigade was formed the 100th Guards Rifle Regiment, 18th and 19th Brigade(s) became the 101st and 102nd Guards regiments respectively. In August, the division was assigned to the Stalingrad Front and fought on the approaches to Stalingrad, and then in the city as part of 62nd Army (later 8th Guards) Army. Guards divisions were one of the first defenders of the Stalingrad grain elevator.

On September 27, 1942, the division was withdrawn from the front line and sent to re-form in the Saratov region.

In January – February 1943, the division participated in the attack on the Donbass area. It freed Starobelsk. On February 11, 1943 released the station Lozova, Novomoskovsk, Sinelnikovo. During these battles was awarded the Order of the Red Banner, which was awarded the division on June 23, 1943 by the commander of the 6th Army, Lieutenant General Ivan Shlemin. Order of the Supreme Commander was awarded the honorary name "Lozovskaya."

After retrofitting again took part in the fighting. It freed Barvenkovo/Barvinkove. In September 1943, the division crossed the Dnieper and was fighting on the beachhead, involved in the Nikopol operation.

It fought at Stalingrad, in the Don Basin, at Pavlograd, Kharkiv, Kryvyi Rih, Nikopol, Odessa, the Magnuszew Bridgehead, Küstrin, and in the Battle of Berlin. It was with 4th Guards Rifle Corps of the 8th Guards Army of the 1st Belorussian Front May 1945.

== Postwar ==
The division was disbanded in August 1946, along with the 4th Guards Rifle Corps headquarters in the Group of Soviet Forces in Germany.
