= Regional Government of Northwest Russia =

Russian Civil War

Regional Government of Northwest Russia Региональное правительство Северо-Запада России
- 1918–1919
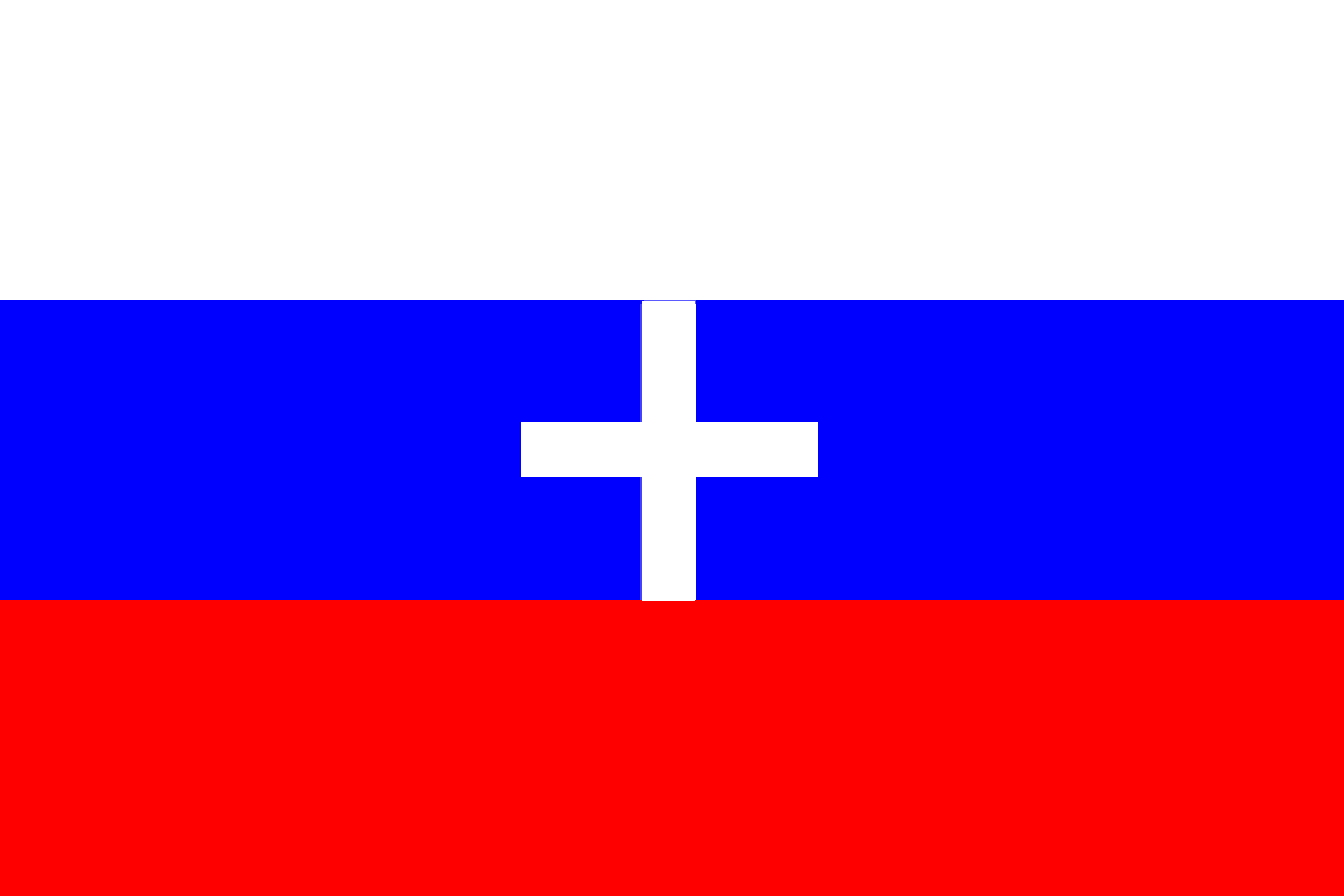
- Flag
- Common languages: Russian
- Historical era: World War I Russian Civil War
  - Pskov Independent Volunteers Corps of the Northern Army was established: 10 October 1918
  - Established: 10 November 1918
  - Government dissolved by the Republic of Estonia.: 5 November 1919
| Preceded by | Succeeded by |
| Russian Republic | Republic of Estonia; Russian SFSR |

The Regional (Oblast) Government of Northwest Russia was a short-lived White counter-revolutionary government formed on 10 November 1918, after the October Revolution. Politically, it was a weak, ill-supported, and highly-disorganized governing body, though it formally oversaw the development of the Northern Corps and the antibolshevik operations against Petrograd in the autumn of 1919.

== History ==
On 10 October 1918, a military force called the Pskov Independent Volunteers Corps of the Northern Army was established in the Pskov-Ostrov-Rēzekne region, which at the time had been occupied by Germany since 24 February 1918. In November, the Regional (Oblast) Council of Defence of Northwest Russia was formed. On August 11, 1919, the Council of Defence was reformed as the Regional (Oblast) Government of Northwest Russia under the encouragement of General Hubert Gough and the Allied Military Mission to the Baltic.

Much of the Regional Government of Northwest Russia's significance was tied to the Northern Corps. After December 1918, following an agreement with Estonia, the corps was put under Estonian control and fought in the Estonian War of Independence. In May 1919, the Northwestern Army was formed by general Nikolai Yudenich, one of the most successful Russian commanders of World War I. In October, under the command of Yudenich, he commanded the assault on Petrograd, capturing Tsarskoye Selo. However, Yudenich's forces were overexerted and were driven back to Estonia in the face of Red Army counterattacks. The retreat resulted in the collapse and eventual internment of the Northwestern Army at the Estonian border. Without an army to support itself, the government was dissolved in early January 1920.
