= 368th Rifle Division =

368th Rifle Division (August 10, 1941 – March 1946)
- Active: 1941 - 1946
- Country: Soviet Union
- Branch: Red Army
- Type: Division
- Role: Infantry
- Engagements: Continuation War; Svir–Petrozavodsk Offensive; Petsamo–Kirkenes Offensive
- Decorations: Order of the Red Banner
- Battle honours: Petsamo (Pechenga)

Commanders
- Notable commanders: Col. Fyodor Afanasevich Ostashenko; Maj. Gen. Vasilii Kalenikovich Sopenko

The 368th Rifle Division was raised in 1941 as a standard Red Army rifle division, and served for the duration of the Great Patriotic War in that role. It began forming in August 1941 in the Siberian Military District. After forming, it remained in the reserves of that district until March 1942, when it was assigned to the 7th Separate Army in Karelia, where it remained until mid-1944. The division had a mostly uneventful war on this defensive front, but then took part in the offensive that drove Finland out of the war in the summer of that year, being awarded the Order of the Red Banner for its services. It later saw action against the German forces trying to hold northern Finland. The division ended the war in the Belomorsky Military District on garrison duties in the Soviet Arctic.

== Formation ==
The division began forming on August 10, 1941 in the Siberian Military District at Tyumentsevo. Its basic order of battle was as follows:

- 1224th Rifle Regiment
- 1226th Rifle Regiment
- 1228th Rifle Regiment
- 939th Artillery Regiment

Col. Fyodor Afanasevich Ostashenko was not assigned to command of the division until September 23, and he would remain in command until June 10, 1942. In September the division was noted as being made up mostly of Siberians, and although formed from reservists, 57 percent of the personnel were under 35 years of age, indicating a better-than-average cadre of younger and fitter men. In November the division was assigned to the 58th Army, which was forming in the same District at that time, but it remained in the reserve of that Army until March 1942. It was then moved to join the 7th Separate Army in East Karelia, facing the Finnish Army along the Svir River between Lake Ladoga and Lake Onega. On June 11 the division's deputy commanding officer, Col. Vasilii Kalenikovich Sopenko, took over from Colonel Ostashenko; Sopenko would be promoted to Major General on October 16, 1943, and would remain in command for the duration of the war.

== Combat service ==
The 368th continued to serve on this relatively quiet front through 1943 and into 1944. Through most of this time it was subordinated to the 4th Rifle Corps. On February 1, 1944, 7th Army became part of Karelian Front, in preparation for the final reckoning with Finland. Leningrad Front began its offensive on the Isthmus of Karelia on June 10, making rapid progress towards Vyborg despite strong Finnish resistance. On June 16 the Finnish commander-in-chief, Marshal Mannerheim, issued orders to give up East Karelia, to free up forces for the main front on the Isthmus, so when Karelian Front launched its own offensive across the Svir on the 20th it faced a very fluid situation. The 368th distinguished itself in the fighting to breach the Svir River line and on July 2 was awarded the Order of the Red Banner.

From July to September the division was assigned to 32nd Army, operating from the Segezhsky District of the Karelo-Finnish SSR, in the latter month following up the German withdrawal from Finland. It was then assigned to the 99th Rifle Corps of 14th Army as the conflict moved even farther north, but was soon reassigned to 131st Rifle Corps in the same Army. When the Petsamo–Kirkenes Offensive began on October 7 the 368th was one of the assault divisions in the 131st Corps. The division's two attack regiments had the following strengths:

- 1226th Rifle Regiment - 1050 officers and men with 570 sub-machine guns, 70 light machine guns, 25 heavy machine guns and 3 mortars;
- 1228th Rifle Regiment - 1100 officers and men with 695 sub-machine guns, 71 light machine guns, 26 heavy machine guns and 3 mortars.

During the course of the offensive the German forces were driven back into German-held Norway, and on October 15 the division was awarded a battle honor:

"PETSAMO (PECHENGA)... 368th Rifle Division (Maj. Gen. Sopenko, Vasilii Kalenikovich)... The troops who participated in the liberation of Petsamo, by the order of the Supreme High Command of 15 October 1944, and a commendation in Moscow, are given a salute of 20 artillery salvos from 224 guns.

In January 1945, the division was moved to the Belomorsky Military District, and remained there on garrison duty for the remainder of the war. It ended the war with the full title 368th Rifle, Pechenga, Order of the Red Banner Division (Russian: 368-я стрелковая Печенгская Краснознамённая дивизия). General Sopenko remained in command until March 11, 1946.
