= Kolyvan =

Kolyvan (Russian: Колывань or Russian: Колыван) has various referents:

== Placenames ==
The name of several inhabited localities in Russia.

- Urban localities
  - Kolyvan, Novosibirsk Oblast, a work settlement in Kolyvansky District of Novosibirsk Oblast
- Rural localities
  - Kolyvan, Altai Krai, a selo in Kolyvansky Selsoviet of Kuryinsky District of Altai Krai
  - Kolyvan, Samara Oblast, a selo in Krasnoarmeysky District of Samara Oblast
- Historical places
  - Kolyvan, an ancient Russian name of the city of Tallinn in present-day Estonia

== Personal names ==
- Kolyvan (Russian: Колыван), a bogatyr who appears in various Russian byliny
