= Supreme Military Council (Soviet Russia) =

Council that had supreme military authority over Red Army

- Высший военный совет
- Supreme Military Council symbol, a red star with an image of a hammer and a plow

Agency overview
- Formed: 3 March 1918
- Dissolved: 2 September 1918
- Superseding agency: Revolutionary Military Council
- Jurisdiction: RSFSR
- Headquarters: Moscow, Russia
- Agency executive: Chairman
- Parent agency: Council of Ministers of the Soviet Union

The Supreme Military Council (Russian: Высший военный совет) was the first supreme military body of strategic leadership of the Armed Forces of the Soviet Republic.

== History ==
The Supreme Military Council was established on March 3, 1918, after the signing of the Brest Peace Treaty, to organize the defense of the state of workers and peasants, the country and the formation of the Red Army.

Initially, the Supreme Military Council included a military leader and two political commissars.

On March 19, by a resolution of the Council of People's Commissars of the RSFSR, the positions of chairman, members of the Supreme Military Council and their deputies were introduced, and the positions of political commissars were abolished. The chairman of the Supreme Military Council was People's Commissar for Military Affairs Lev Trotsky. The Council coordinated the activities of the military and naval departments, set them tasks for the defense of the state and the organization of the armed forces.

By the summer of 1918, the formation of the Supreme Military Council was complete. Three directorates were created within it - operational, organizational and military communications. The inspectors of artillery, engineers, military economic, military sanitary and others reported directly to the military leader. Almost all positions in the council were occupied by former career generals and officers of the Russian army.

On September 2, 1918, by decree of the All-Russian Central Executive Committee, the Supreme Military Council was abolished, with the functions transferred to the Revolutionary Military Council.
