= Revolutionary Military Council =

Council that had supreme military authority over Soviet Military

- Революционный Военный Совет
- Revolutionary Military Council symbol, a red star with an image of a hammer and a plow

Agency overview
- Formed: 2 September 1918
- Preceding agency: Supreme Military Council
- Dissolved: 20 June 1934
- Jurisdiction: Russian Soviet Federative Socialist Republic
- Headquarters: Petrograd, (later in Moscow), RSFSR

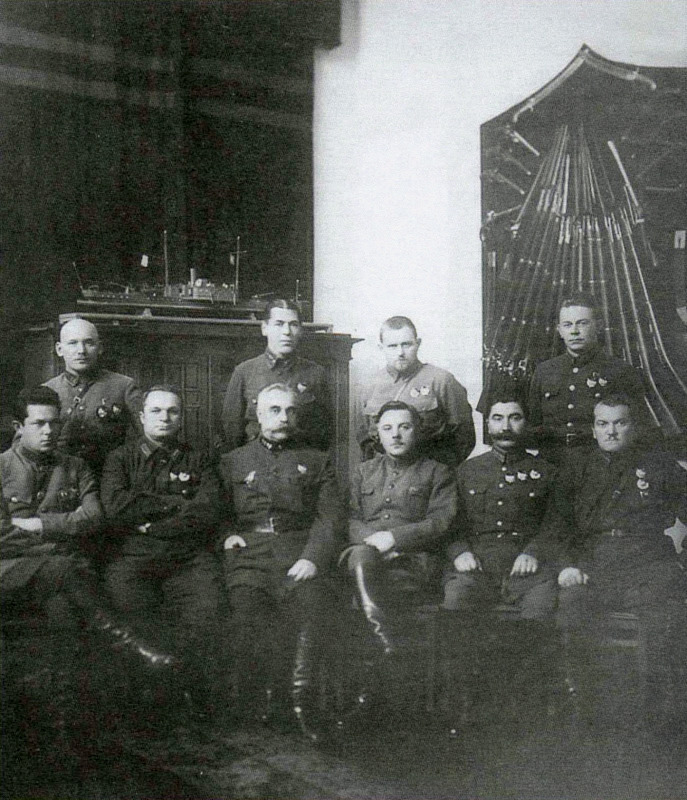
Revolutionary Military Council, December 1927. Seated from left to right: I Yakir, A. Egorov, S. Kamenev, K. Voroshilov, S. Budenny, M. Lavandovsky. Standing: K Abksentevsky, B. Shaposhnikov, I. Belov, I. Uborevich.

The Revolutionary Military Council (Russian: Революционный Военный Совет, romanized: Revolyutsionny Voyenny Sovyet), sometimes called the Revolutionary War Council or Revvoyensoviet (Реввоенсовет), was the supreme military authority of Soviet Russia and later the Soviet Union. It was instituted on September 2, 1918, by decree of the All-Russian Central Executive Committee (VTsIK), known as the "Decree Declaring the Soviet Republic Military Camp".

Prior to Revvoyensoviet, the two main military authorities had been the Supreme Military Council (Высший военный совет, Vysshy voyenny sovyet) and the operations division of the People's Commissariat on War and Navy Affairs.

The decree put all fronts and military organizations under the command of the chairman of Revvoyensoviet, with a commander-in-chief second-in-line to the chairman to lead strategic and military operations stateside. The chairman was appointed by VTsIK on to serve as People's Commissar (or narkom) of War and Navy Affairs.

The first chairman of Revvoyensoviet was Leon Trotsky, with former Latvian Rifleman officer Jukums Vācietis as his commander-in-chief. Vācietis was replaced in July 1919 by Sergei Kamenev who served until 1924.

On November 30, 1918, the Council of Labour and Defense was created with the goal of mobilizing the country's resources towards defense. Headed by Lenin, the council consisted of the premier (Lenin), the chairman of Revvoyensoviet (Trotsky), a representative of VTsIK (Joseph Stalin), and several narkoms.

Revvoyensoviet was dissolved under the Soviet Union in 1934.

== See also ==
- Military Revolutionary Committee
