= Alexander Rodzyanko =

Ukrainian general (1879–1970)

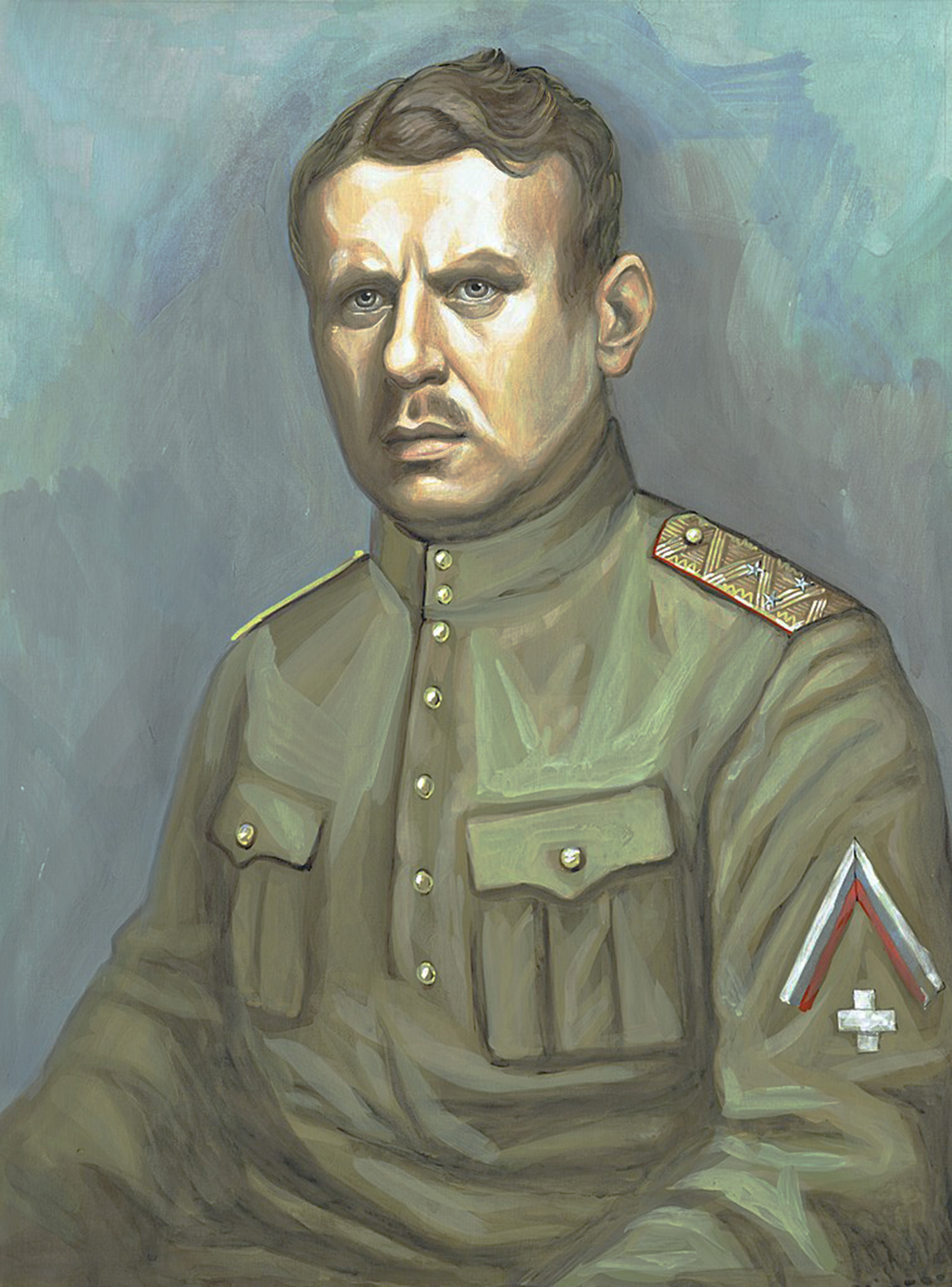
- Born: 26 August 1879; Russian Empire
- Died: 6 May 1970 (aged 90) New York City, United States
- Allegiance: Russian Empire
- Branch: Imperial Russian Army; White Movement (Northwestern Army)
- Service years: 1897–1920
- Rank: Lieutenant General
- Conflicts: World War I Russian Civil War; Estonian War of Independence
- Awards: Order of Saint Vladimir; Order of Saint Anna; Order of Saint Stanislaus; Cross «13 may 1919»

Alexander Pavlovich Rodzyanko (Russian: Александр Павлович Родзянко; 26 August 1879 – 6 May 1970) was an officer of the Imperial Russian Army during World War I and lieutenant-general and a corps commander of the White Army during the Russian Civil War. He also competed at the 1912 Summer Olympics.

== Biography ==
Rodzyanko came from an old Ukrainian aristocratic family: his father Pavel Rodzyanko was a major landowner and his uncle Mikhail Rodzianko chaired the State Duma from 1911 to 1917. Aleksandr received his education in the Russian Page Corps military academy and at the Cadre Noir cavalry-school in Saumur in France; he then joined the elite Russian Chevalier Guard regiment. An excellent equestrian sportsman, he also studied for a year at the cavalry school at Pinerolo in Italy under Captain Federico Caprilli, known as "the father of the modern forward seat". After successfully participating in London (1911), winning the King Eduard VII Cup, he competed in the 5th-placed jumping team for Russia at the 1912 Olympic Games in Stockholm. Most of the equestrian information about Rodzyanko was published by a Dutch horse magazine, called the 'Hoefslag' by the secretary of the FEI Max E. Amman.

Promoted to Colonel in 1912, he went on to take part in World War I. In 1914 he was sent to the frontline where he briefly served in the 2nd Kuban Regiment and the 1st Linear Cossack Regiment and headed the 16th Don Regiment. He later served at the 8th Army and Chevalier Guard Regiment. From May 1916 he headed the Cavalry Officers School. From June to July 1917 he headed the Garrison of Riga. In October 1917, in Pskov the 17th Cavalry Division that he headed was disbanded and he was interned by the Germans.

After the Russian Revolution of 1917 he accompanied Prince Lieven to solicit (unsuccessfully) British help for counter-revolutionaries active in Latvia. In 1918 he lived in Riga and received the German assistance in recruiting the volunteers into the anti-Bolshevik units. In 1919 General Nikolay Yudenich appointed Rodzyanko (then commander of the Whites' Northern Corps) as his aide, where he led the counter-offensive actions against the Reds and participated in the unsuccessful advance on Petrograd. Once the Northwestern Army had been pushed back to Narva, Estonia, on 23 November 1919, Yudenich sent him to England to seek financial support for the further anti-bolshevik combat. After his mission proved abortive, he chose not to return to Estonia but settled in the United Kingdom and later in the United States.

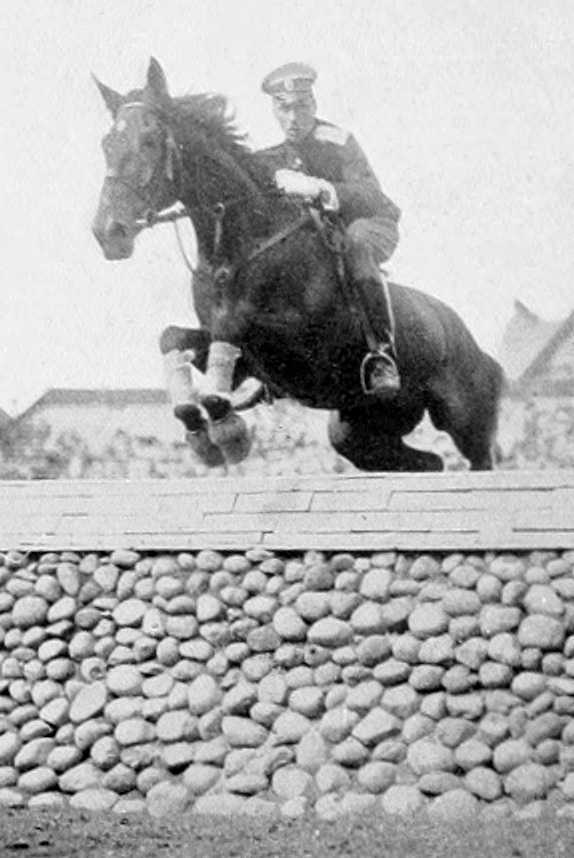
Rodzyanko at the 1912 Summer Olympics

His brother Pavel Rodzyanko became an instructor at the Irish cavalry school in Dublin and later emigrated to the United States. Aleksandr Pavlovich Rodzyanko became president of the Chevalier Guards association, wrote memoirs and died in New York City aged 90. He is buried at the Novo-Diveevo Cemetery in Nanuet, Rockland County, New York.

== Honours and awards ==
- Order of St. Vladimir, 4th class with Swords (1913)
- Order of St. Anna, 3rd class (1913)
- Order of Saint Stanislaus, 3rd class (1913)
- Order of St. Anna, 4th class (1915)

More than 7 medals
