= 7th Army (RSFSR) =

Former Soviet military unit

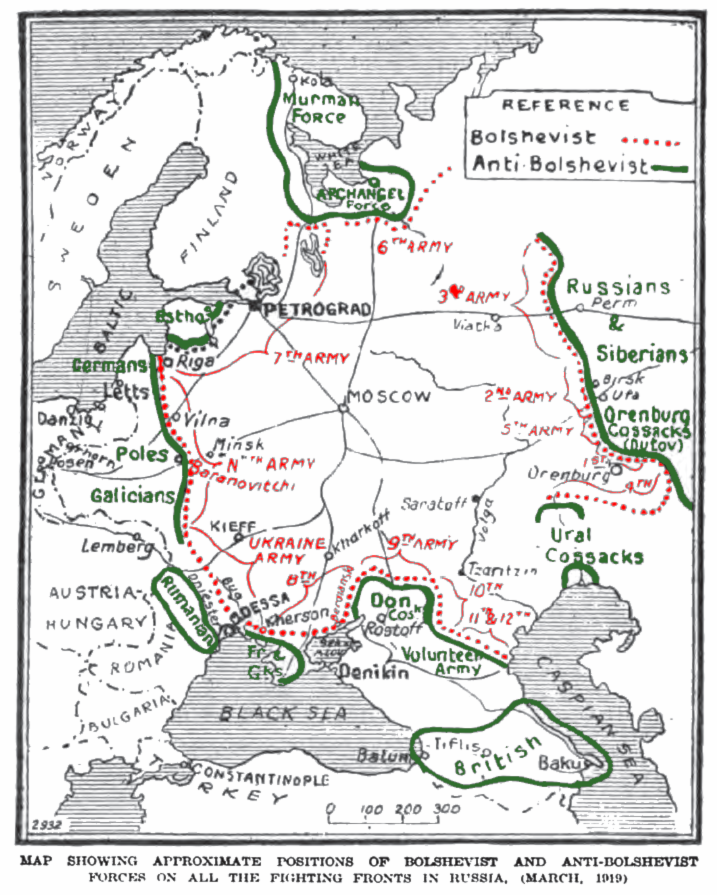
Military positions in March 1919

The 7th Army was a field army of the Red Army during the Russian Civil War, which existed between November 1918 and February 1920.

== History ==
The 7th Army was formed on November 1, 1918, from the units of the former Olonets group of troops, the 2nd Petrograd Infantry Division and the Pskov Rifle Division. It was part of the Northern Front which fought against Entente troops and the White Northern Army which were based in Arkhangelsk and Murmansk. After the disbandment of Northern Front the 7th Army was transferred to the Western Front.

The 7th Army also took part in the Soviet campaign against Estonia. On November 22, 1918, units of the 7th Army attacked Narva for the first time, but the assault was repulsed by the German troops still remaining in the city. A week later, the Soviet troops seized the city. Then the troops of the 7th Army began to advance westward, and by early January 1919 they were 35 kilometers from Tallinn. But on January 7, 1919, the Estonian 1st division launched a counter-offensive, and already on January 19 the Estonians and Finns took Narva and entered the territory of the Petrograd Governate.

In spring 1919 the 7th Army defended the approaches to Petrograd against Finnish troops on the Karelian and Onega-Ladoga Isthmus, the White Guard Northern Corps of Major-General Dzerozhinsky and Estonian troops south of the Gulf of Finland. On June 21 the 7th Army launched an offensive against the troops of the Northwestern Army (the former Northern Corps). On August 5, Yamburg was taken, after which they halted their advance.

In the autumn of 1919, the troops of the Northwestern Army under Major-General Alexander Rodzyanko and from October 2, General Nikolai Yudenich undertook a second attempt to conquer Petrograd. The outskirts of the city were reached but the reinforced 7th Army was able to halt their advance and launched a counteroffensive on October 21. The North-Western Army was pushed back in chaos and disintegrated. Its remains retreated into Estonia where they were interned. On December 31, an armistice agreement between the RSFSR and Estonia came into force, and on February 2, 1920, the Tartu Peace Treaty was concluded, which meant the end of the war in the Northwest of the RSFSR.

Immediately afterwards, the administration of the 7th Army was disbanded.

== Commanders ==
- Eugen Iskritsky : 01.11.1918 — 28.11.1918
- Evgeny Golubintsev : 28.11.1918 — 05.12.1918
- Nikolai Henrikson : 05.12.1918 — 27.01.1919
- Alexander Remezov : 27.01.1919 — 01.07.1919
- Mikhail Matiyasevich : 01.07.1919 — 26.09.1919
- Sergei Kharlamov :26.09.1919 — 17.10.1919
- Dmitry Nikolayevich Nadyozhny 17.10.1919 — 17.11.1919
- Sergei Odintsov : 17.11.1919 — 10.02.1920

Members of the Revolutionary Military Council include

- Boris Pozern (09.12.1918 — 05.05.1919)
- Ivan Mezhlauk (25.05.1919 — 28.06.1919)
- Arkady Rosengolts (28.06.1919 — 30.09.1919)
- Grigory Zinoviev (14.07.1919 — 26.11.1919)
- Nikolai Podvoisky (06.10.1919 — 17.12.1919)
- Mikhail Lashevich (23.10.1919 — 10.02.1920)
