= Dmitri Parsky =

Russian general (1866–1921)

Dmitri Pavlovich Parsky
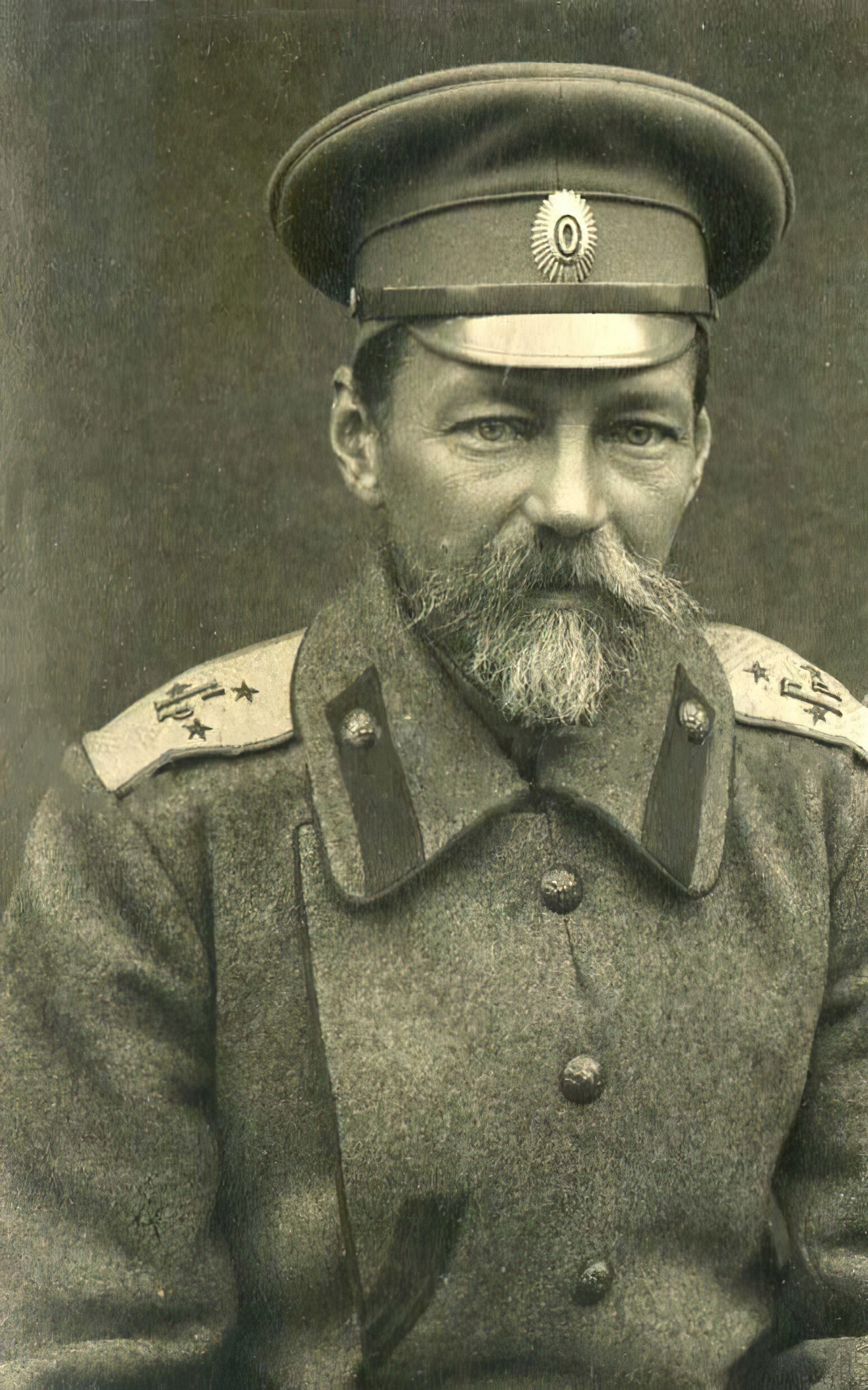
- Born: 29 October [O.S. 17 October] 1866; Tula Governorate, Russian Empire
- Died: 20 December 1921 (aged 55); Moscow, Russian SSR
- Military career
- Allegiance: Russian Empire; Russian SFSR
- Branch: Imperial Russian Army; Red Army
- Service years: 1884–1921
- Commands: 12th Army; 3rd Army; Northern Front
- Conflicts: Russo-Japanese War; World War I Russian Civil War

Dmitri Pavlovich Parsky (Russian: Дми́трий Па́влович Па́рский; 29 October [O.S. 17 October] 1866 – 20 December 1921) was an Imperial Russian Army general during World War I, who fought on the Eastern Front.

== Life ==
Parsky was born to the family of Pavel Parsky and Natalya Ladyzhenskaya, nobles from the Epifansky district of the Tula Governorate. In 1893 he attended the General Staff Academy.

He was among early generals advocating military reform following the disastrous Russo-Japanese War. He advocated for better education for officers, equal and fair pay, and better prospects for promotion. He advocated soldiers be treated as individuals and their rights under the law be enforced by unit commanders, and a promotion system based on merit.

During World War I, he commanded the 12th Army from 20 July to 9 September 1917 and the 3rd Army from 9 September 1917 to 8 November 1917.

He was the first battle-experienced Tsarist General to offer his services to the Red Army, explaining his viewpoint thus:

"I am far from this Bolshevism you preach. But I am ready to work honourably not only with them, but with anyone, even the Devil and his disciples, if only to save Russia from German slavery."

During the Russian Civil War, he first was commander of the Narva Front and later of the entire Northern Front.

He died of typhus in 1921 and is buried at the Vagankovo Cemetery.

== Honours and awards ==
- Order of St. Stanislaus, 3rd class (1896);
- Order of St. Anne 3rd class (1900);
- Order of St. Stanislaus, 2nd class (1903);
- Order of St. Anne, 2nd class with swords (1906);
- Order of St. Vladimir, 4th class with swords and bow (1906);
- Order of St. Vladimir, 3rd class (1909, 31 January 1910);
- Order of St. Stanislaus, 1st class (6 December 1913)
- Order of St. George, 4th class (2 June 1915)
- Gold Sword for Bravery (1916)
