= Kolyvan, Altai Krai =

Rural locality in Kuryinsky District, Russia

Coordinates: 51°18′50″N 82°34′13″E

Kolyvan (Russian: Колыва́нь) is a rural locality (a village) in Kuryinsky District of Altai Krai, Russia, located on the slopes of the Kolyvan Range.

Kolyvan was founded in the first half of the 18th century due to the construction of the Kolyvan-Voskresensky copper- and silver-melting plant, which would operate until 1799. Starting in 1786, the so-called "polishing mill" (polishing and lapidary factory since 1802) had been producing decorative articles for the royal court, such as vases, fireplaces, columns, etc. Often, they would use the drawings of Giacomo Quarenghi, Andrei Voronikhin, Carlo Rossi, and others to create their luxurious items. The very best works of the Kolyvan masters are currently displayed in the Hermitage Museum in St. Petersburg.

During the Soviet years, this factory's successor, namely the Polzunov Stonecutting Factory (Камнерезный завод имени И. И. Ползунова), was processing jasper, porphyry, quartzite, and marble for scientific and artistic purposes.
