= Northern Front (RSFSR) =

Frontlines in 1918-1919

The Northern Front (Russian: Северный фронт) was a front of the Red Army during the Russian Civil War which was formed on 15 September 1918 to fight the troops of the interventionists and White Guards in the Northwest, North and Northeast of the Soviet Republic. The Northern Front covered the area between Pskov and Vyatka. It bordered the Eastern Front of the Red Army along the Balakhna - Yarensk - Glazov - Cherdyn line. The Front headquarters were located in Yaroslavl.

The Northern Front was replaced by the Western Front on 19 February 1919.

== Operations ==
The North-eastern and Northern area of the Northern Front, had no continuous line of defense, as natural conditions made combat operations impossible in most areas. Operations were mainly conducted along main transport communication lines (rivers and roads).

The 6th Army conducted an active defense along the Vologda - Arkhangelsk - Kotlas - Northern Dvina line. The strategic task of the army was to prevent the joining of the armed forces of the White Movement in the North and the East of Russia.
The 7th Army conducted defensive battles on the outskirts of Petrograd in the Inter-District area, on the Karelian Isthmus and the Narva - Pskov line.

In January 1919, during the Battle of Shenkursk, the 6th Army stopped the advance of the enemy and created favorable conditions for a counter-offensive against Arkhangelsk.
In the winter of 1918 and 1919, the 7th Army conducted an offensive on the Narva - Pskov line, but as a result of counterattacks by the Estonian Army with the support of the Entente and the participation of Finnish and Swedish volunteers, they were forced to withdraw behind the Narva River.

In view of the increasing danger to Petrograd and the need for closer cooperation between the 7th Army, the Army of Soviet Latvia and the Western Army, on February 12, 1919, the Commander-in-Chief formed a new Western Front on the basis of the Northern Front Administration.

The Northern Front itself was abolished on February 19, 1919.

== Composition ==
- 6th Army
- 7th Army
- Army of Soviet Latvia
- Ladoga Military Flotilla
- Onega Military Flotilla
- North-Dvinskaya Military Flotilla
- Kronstadt Fortress (from 8 December)

== Commanders ==
Commanders :

- Dmitri Parsky (15 September 1918 - 26 November 1918)
- Dmitry Nikolayevich Nadyozhny (26 November 1918 - 19 February 1919)

Chiefs of Staff :

- Fyodor Kostyayev (20 September 1918 - 21 October 1918)
- Nikolai Domozhirov (21 October 1918 - 19 February 1919)
