= Northwestern Army (Russia) =

White army during the Russian Civil War

- Emblem and arm patch of the Northwestern Army
- Active: 10 October 1918 – 22 January 1920
- Country: Russian Republic
- Branch: White Army
- Type: Field Army
- Garrison/HQ: Pskov
- Engagements: Russian Civil War: Battle of Petrograd

Commanders
- Commander: Nikolai Yudenich

The Northwestern Army was a White Army that operated in the Pskov Governorate, Saint Petersburg Governorate, Estonia and Latvia during the Russian Civil War from 1919 to 1920.

== History ==
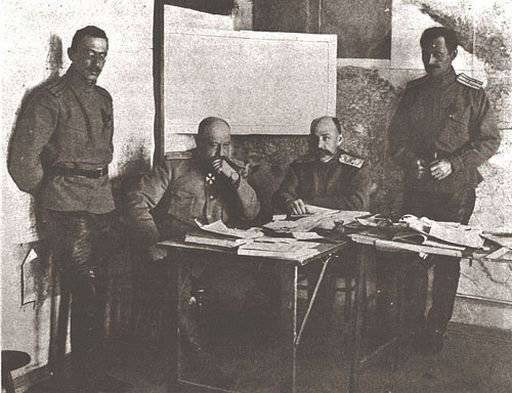
Gen. Yudenich of North-Western Army and the staff members

The origin of the Northwest Army was the plan to create an army by a group of reactionary Petrograd officers in the summer of 1918, in the territory controlled by Germany and with German support to confront the Bolsheviks. By October 10, 1918, a force of some 6,000 troops was created in the city of Pskov, which was called the Northern Corps. A quarter of them were officers of the former Tsarist army, and the rest was made up of local recruits, escaped Petrograd officers and prisoners of war released by the Germans.

The military supplies promised by the Germans didn't materialize and the Northern Corps had to retreat abruptly into Estonia at the end of November 1918. The Estonian Government, faced with a Bolshevik advance, accepted to take the White force into its territory and supply it, in exchange for passing under its control, and this despite the ideological difference between the independence fighters of Tallinn and the Russian White Movement. Under pressure from the British gen. Gough who promised to arrange for Estonian and British military assistance in advance on Petrograd, Nikolai N. Yudenich formed a Government of Northwestern Region of Russia encompassing Petrograd, Novgorod and Pskov governorates that officially recognised Estonian independence.

Together with the Finnish counterrevolutionary forces of Mannerheim, the Estonians and the Northern Corps were able to stop the advance of the Bolsheviks and to launch a counteroffensive in which they took Pskov and Yamburg in May 1919.

The White administration of the newly conquered territories was disastrous, as Rodzianko's subordinates unleashed a wave of terror against suspected Bolsheviks and against the Jewish population in general.

In June, the Northern Corps, now renamed the Northwestern Army, approached Luga, Ropcha and Gatchina, threatening Petrograd. But the Bolsheviks mobilized their reserves and aligned 40,000 men against the Northwestern Army supported by two Estonian divisions. On August 1, the Bolsheviks launched a counter-attack and drove back the Estonian troops, who were reluctant to fight outside their country. On August 5, Yamburg fell and Pskov was recaptured by the Reds on August 28.

== Petrograd Campaign ==
On October 12, 1919, the Northwestern Army, some 18,500 men strong against 25,000 on the Red side, forced the frontline at Yamburg and seized on October 16 Luga and Gatchina. On October 20 Tsarskoye Selo fell into the hands of the White troops, who were now at the gates of Petrograd. They captured the Pulkovo Heights, the left flank of the Army entered Ligovo and advanced units engaged the enemy in skirmishes as far as the Ijorski factories. But the lack of forces and means, Estonia's lack of support, the disobedience of Pavel Bermondt-Avalov and his West Russian Volunteer Army, the passivity of the British fleet, and the Red numerical superiority made it impossible to take Petrograd. After ten days of fierce fighting with the Reds, whose numbers had risen to 60,000, the North-West Army was pushed back by the 7th and 15th Red Army from November 2, 1919 and retreated fighting into Estonia in the Narva region East of Narova river. The last and unsuccessful attempt of the Reds to capture Narva from the Whites was undertaken on 17 December 1919.

== Internment and collapse ==
During April–December 1919 the Soviet Russian government and their Estonian counterpart were involved in the peace talks that ended with 1920 Tartu (Yuriev) Peace Treaty. Its Article 7 provisioned that the parties cease to support the forces hostile to each other, and undertake to disarm and neutralize these on their own territory.

Once the retreating North-Western Army, the Red prisoners of war and the refugees fleeing the Reds in total of about 40-50 thousand approached Narva, Estonians first refused to allow the train to pass through the bridge over Narova river motivating it with a fear of the typhus epidemic that hit the army. Its personnel was ordered to stay in cold carriages in Ivangorod (then Eastern part of Narva) on a narrow landstrip between the river and the newly-agreed Russian-Estonian border. An eyewitness of these events, writer Alexandr Kuprin, reported of numerous deaths from the cold and starvation in one single night, mostly women and children. Others recall hundreds dead bodies transported in the lorries and buried in the open graves in the suburbs of Narva. Typhus death toll in Narva is estimated at 4000. Some time thereafter trains were allowed to pass to Estonia proper, where 15,000 soldiers and officers of the Northwestern Army were disarmed, and 5,000 of them were interned in camps, partly on the open air. Around the same number of the former soldiers were under supervision employed in logging in the nearby forests, shale mines and in agricultural field works, as the government of Estonia claimed it could not feed such number of people for free. Those who were caught more than 2 versts away from the designated working places were subject to deportation to Soviet Russia. The former anti-Bolshevik allies, demobilized Russian soldiers and officers, were deemed as a "20-thousands large gang" that somehow had to be disposed of. For example, it was also suggested to divert the soldiers to the large Russian villages on the lake Peipus (Chudskoye) since "...should Typhus spread there, it will not be that painful to see the number of Russians there to diminish". According to the accounts of an officer Kuzmin, his Talabsky regiment was disarmed and then pushed back into Narova river where it was shot by the Reds. General Yudenich accused of an attempt to escape with the Army's funds was arrested by men of Bułak-Bałachowicz with the tacit consent of the Estonian authorities, before being released after the intervention of the commander of the English squadron anchored at Tallinn. This misconduct was addressed, yet to no avail, in a letter of protest from the former member of the Russian Provisional government, Guchkov, to Winston Churchill.

However, as the Estonian newspaper Sotsial-demokraat reported on 30 November 1919, the living conditions of about 4000 refugees then residing in Wesenberg county had been improved and the food was provided to them at the expense of American charity organizations. For the needs of medical treatment eleven Russian hospitals all across Estonia were established by the Estonian Army using the facilities of the Northwestern Army, and six more by the Estonian and American Red Cross. On January 22, 1920, by decree of Nikolai Yudenich, the Northwestern Army ceased to exist, the Army's funds were distributed as the final salary and its remaining property was requisitioned by the government. In total around 17 thousand died after internment, and survivors were mostly denied to permanently stay in Estonia and fled further to Central and Western Europe. Yudenich went into exile in France, where he died near Nice on October 5, 1933.

== Strength ==
- 17,500 (July 1919)
- 18,500 (October 1919)
- 15,000 (November 1919)

== Commanders ==
- Anton Dzerozhinsky (1918 – 19.06.1919)
- Alexander Rodzyanko (19.06.1919 – 02.10.1919)
- Nikolai Yudenich (02.10.1919 – 28.11.1919)
- Peter Vladimir von Glasenapp (28.11.1919 – 22.01.1920)

== Memory ==
In 2016 in Estonia the newspaper "Prinevskiy Kray" of the Northwestern Army was digitized by the enthusiasts.
