= Alexandrovsky, Russia =

Alexandrovsky (Russian: Алекса́ндровский; masculine), Alexandrovskaya (Алекса́ндровская; feminine), or Alexandrovskoye (Алекса́ндровское; neuter) is the name of several rural localities in Russia.

== Modern inhabited localities ==
=== Altai Krai ===
As of 2010, one rural locality in Altai Krai bears this name:

- Alexandrovsky, Altai Krai, a settlement in Alexandrovsky Selsoviet of Aleysky District

=== Arkhangelsk Oblast ===
As of 2010, two rural localities in Arkhangelsk Oblast bear this name:

- Alexandrovskaya, Kholmogorsky District, Arkhangelsk Oblast, a village in Koydokursky Selsoviet of Kholmogorsky District
- Alexandrovskaya, Velsky District, Arkhangelsk Oblast, a village in Shadrengsky Selsoviet of Velsky District

=== Republic of Bashkortostan ===
As of 2010, one rural locality in the Republic of Bashkortostan bears this name:

- Alexandrovsky, Republic of Bashkortostan, a khutor in Krivle-Ilyushkinsky Selsoviet of Kuyurgazinsky District

=== Belgorod Oblast ===
As of 2010, two rural localities in Belgorod Oblast bear this name:

- Alexandrovsky, Gubkinsky District, Belgorod Oblast, a khutor in Gubkinsky District
- Alexandrovsky, Shebekinsky District, Belgorod Oblast, a khutor in Shebekinsky District

=== Bryansk Oblast ===
As of 2010, four rural localities in Bryansk Oblast bear this name:

- Alexandrovsky, Sevsky District, Bryansk Oblast, a settlement in Nekislitsky Selsoviet of Sevsky District
- Alexandrovsky, Kamensky Selsoviet, Surazhsky District, Bryansk Oblast, a settlement in Kamensky Selsoviet of Surazhsky District
- Alexandrovsky, Novodrokovsky Selsoviet, Surazhsky District, Bryansk Oblast, a settlement in Novodrokovsky Selsoviet of Surazhsky District
- Alexandrovskoye, Bryansk Oblast, a selo in Dubrovsky Selsoviet of Brasovsky District

=== Chelyabinsk Oblast ===
As of 2010, two rural localities in Chelyabinsk Oblast bear this name:

- Alexandrovsky, Kizilsky District, Chelyabinsk Oblast, a settlement in Izmaylovsky Selsoviet of Kizilsky District
- Alexandrovsky, Verkhneuralsky District, Chelyabinsk Oblast, a settlement in Karagaysky Selsoviet of Verkhneuralsky District

=== Chuvash Republic ===
As of 2010, one rural locality in the Chuvash Republic bears this name:

- Alexandrovskoye, Chuvash Republic, a selo in Alexandrovskoye Rural Settlement of Morgaushsky District

=== Irkutsk Oblast ===
As of 2010, one rural locality in Irkutsk Oblast bears this name:

- Alexandrovskoye, Irkutsk Oblast, a selo in Bokhansky District

=== Kabardino-Balkar Republic ===
As of 2010, two rural localities in the Kabardino-Balkar Republic bear this name:

- Alexandrovsky, Kabardino-Balkar Republic, a khutor in Prokhladnensky District
- Alexandrovskaya, Kabardino-Balkar Republic, a stanitsa in Maysky District

=== Kirov Oblast ===
As of 2010, six rural localities in Kirov Oblast bear this name:

- Alexandrovsky, Nolinsky District, Kirov Oblast, a pochinok in Ryabinovsky Rural Okrug of Nolinsky District
- Alexandrovsky (pochinok), Sanchursky District, Kirov Oblast, a pochinok in Smetaninsky Rural Okrug of Sanchursky District
- Alexandrovsky (vyselok), Sanchursky District, Kirov Oblast, a vyselok in Smetaninsky Rural Okrug of Sanchursky District
- Alexandrovsky, Urzhumsky District, Kirov Oblast, a pochinok in Buysky Rural Okrug of Urzhumsky District
- Alexandrovskoye, Darovskoy District, Kirov Oblast, a selo in Verkhovondansky Rural Okrug of Darovskoy District
- Alexandrovskoye, Kotelnichsky District, Kirov Oblast, a selo in Alexandrovsky Rural Okrug of Kotelnichsky District

=== Kostroma Oblast ===
As of 2010, one rural locality in Kostroma Oblast bears this name:

- Alexandrovskoye, Kostroma Oblast, a settlement in Alexandrovskoye Settlement of Ostrovsky District

=== Krasnodar Krai ===
As of 2010, three rural localities in Krasnodar Krai bear this name:

- Alexandrovsky, Seversky District, Krasnodar Krai, a khutor in Mikhaylovsky Rural Okrug of Seversky District
- Alexandrovsky, Ust-Labinsky District, Krasnodar Krai, a khutor in Alexandrovsky Rural Okrug of Ust-Labinsky District
- Alexandrovskaya, Krasnodar Krai, a stanitsa in Krasnogvardeysky Rural Okrug of Kanevskoy District

=== Kursk Oblast ===
As of 2010, three rural localities in Kursk Oblast bear this name:

- Alexandrovsky, Fatezhsky District, Kursk Oblast, a khutor in Kolychevsky Selsoviet of Fatezhsky District
- Alexandrovsky, Kastorensky District, Kursk Oblast, a settlement in Alexeyevsky Selsoviet of Kastorensky District
- Alexandrovsky, Kurchatovsky District, Kursk Oblast, a khutor in Dronyayevsky Selsoviet of Kurchatovsky District

=== Mari El Republic ===
As of 2010, one rural locality in the Mari El Republic bears this name:

- Alexandrovsky, Mari El Republic, a village in Mari-Bilyamorsky Rural Okrug of Mari-Tureksky District

=== Moscow Oblast ===
As of 2010, one rural locality in Moscow Oblast bears this name:

- Alexandrovskoye, Moscow Oblast, a village in Yaropoletskoye Rural Settlement of Volokolamsky District

=== Nizhny Novgorod Oblast ===
As of 2010, one rural locality in Nizhny Novgorod Oblast bears this name:

- Alexandrovsky, Nizhny Novgorod Oblast, a settlement in Kerzhemoksky Selsoviet of Shatkovsky District

=== Novgorod Oblast ===
As of 2010, one rural locality in Novgorod Oblast bears this name:

- Alexandrovskoye, Novgorod Oblast, a village in Novoselitskoye Settlement of Novgorodsky District

=== Novosibirsk Oblast ===
As of 2010, four rural localities in Novosibirsk Oblast bear this name:

- Alexandrovsky, Chulymsky District, Novosibirsk Oblast, a settlement in Chulymsky District
- Alexandrovsky, Iskitimsky District, Novosibirsk Oblast, a settlement in Iskitimsky District
- Alexandrovsky, Karasuksky District, Novosibirsk Oblast, a settlement in Karasuksky District
- Alexandrovsky, Kochenyovsky District, Novosibirsk Oblast, a settlement in Kochenyovsky District

=== Omsk Oblast ===
As of 2010, one rural locality in Omsk Oblast bears this name:

- Alexandrovskoye, Omsk Oblast, a selo in Alexandrovsky Rural Okrug of Sherbakulsky District

=== Oryol Oblast ===
As of 2010, five rural localities in Oryol Oblast bear this name:

- Alexandrovsky, Druzhensky Selsoviet, Dmitrovsky District, Oryol Oblast, a settlement in Druzhensky Selsoviet of Dmitrovsky District
- Alexandrovsky, Solominsky Selsoviet, Dmitrovsky District, Oryol Oblast, a settlement in Solominsky Selsoviet of Dmitrovsky District
- Alexandrovsky, Kromskoy District, Oryol Oblast, a khutor in Krivchikovsky Selsoviet of Kromskoy District
- Alexandrovsky, Orlovsky District, Oryol Oblast, a settlement in Zhilyayevsky Selsoviet of Orlovsky District
- Alexandrovsky, Trosnyansky District, Oryol Oblast, a settlement in Muravlsky Selsoviet of Trosnyansky District

=== Rostov Oblast ===
As of 2010, three rural localities in Rostov Oblast bear this name:

- Alexandrovsky, Millerovsky District, Rostov Oblast, a khutor in Trenevskoye Rural Settlement of Millerovsky District
- Alexandrovsky, Oblivsky District, Rostov Oblast, a khutor in Alexandrovskoye Rural Settlement of Oblivsky District
- Alexandrovsky, Salsky District, Rostov Oblast, a khutor in Ivanovskoye Rural Settlement of Salsky District

=== Saint Petersburg ===
As of 2010, one urban locality in Saint Petersburg bears this name:

- Alexandrovskaya, Saint Petersburg, a municipal settlement in Pushkinsky District

=== Saratov Oblast ===
As of 2010, one rural locality in Saratov Oblast bears this name:

- Alexandrovsky, Saratov Oblast, a settlement in Balashovsky District

=== Smolensk Oblast ===
As of 2010, two rural localities in Smolensk Oblast bear this name:

- Alexandrovskoye, Monastyrshchinsky District, Smolensk Oblast, a village in Sobolevskoye Rural Settlement of Monastyrshchinsky District
- Alexandrovskoye, Novoduginsky District, Smolensk Oblast, a village in Izvekovskoye Rural Settlement of Novoduginsky District

=== Stavropol Krai ===
As of 2010, one rural locality in Stavropol Krai bears this name:

- Alexandrovskoye, Stavropol Krai, a selo in Alexandrovsky Selsoviet of Alexandrovsky District

=== Sverdlovsk Oblast ===
As of 2010, two rural localities in Sverdlovsk Oblast bear this name:

- Alexandrovskoye, Sverdlovsk Oblast, a selo in Krasnoufimsky District
- Alexandrovskaya, Sverdlovsk Oblast, a village in Taborinsky District

=== Republic of Tatarstan ===
As of 2010, one rural locality in the Republic of Tatarstan bears this name:

- Alexandrovsky, Republic of Tatarstan, a settlement in Laishevsky District

=== Tomsk Oblast ===
As of 2010, two rural localities in Tomsk Oblast bear this name:

- Alexandrovskoye, Alexandrovsky District, Tomsk Oblast, a selo in Alexandrovsky District
- Alexandrovskoye, Tomsky District, Tomsk Oblast, a selo in Tomsky District

=== Tver Oblast ===
As of 2010, three rural localities in Tver Oblast bear this name:

- Alexandrovsky, Tver Oblast, a khutor in Starosandovskoye Rural Settlement of Sandovsky District
- Alexandrovskoye, Sandovsky District, Tver Oblast, a village in Bolshemalinskoye Rural Settlement of Sandovsky District
- Alexandrovskoye, Zapadnodvinsky District, Tver Oblast, a village in Zapadnodvinskoye Rural Settlement of Zapadnodvinsky District

=== Vologda Oblast ===
As of 2010, five rural localities in Vologda Oblast bear this name:

- Alexandrovskoye, Vologodsky District, Vologda Oblast, a village in Raboche-Krestyansky Selsoviet of Vologodsky District
- Alexandrovskoye, Vytegorsky District, Vologda Oblast, a selo in Annensky Selsoviet of Vytegorsky District
- Alexandrovskaya, Borisovsky Selsoviet, Babayevsky District, Vologda Oblast, a village in Borisovsky Selsoviet of Babayevsky District
- Alexandrovskaya, Volkovsky Selsoviet, Babayevsky District, Vologda Oblast, a village in Volkovsky Selsoviet of Babayevsky District
- Alexandrovskaya, Tarnogsky District, Vologda Oblast, a village in Verkhnekokshengsky Selsoviet of Tarnogsky District

=== Yaroslavl Oblast ===
As of 2010, two rural localities in Yaroslavl Oblast bear this name:

- Alexandrovskoye, Poshekhonsky District, Yaroslavl Oblast, a village in Beloselsky Rural Okrug of Poshekhonsky District
- Alexandrovskoye, Tutayevsky District, Yaroslavl Oblast, a village in Rodionovsky Rural Okrug of Tutayevsky District

== Historical localities ==
- Alexandrovskoye, a village in what now is Amur Oblast, one of the predecessors of the town of Belogorsk

== Renamed localities ==
- Alexandrovsky, former name of Alexandrovsk-Sakhalinsky from 1881 to 1926
- Alexandrovskaya, former name of Alexandrovsk-Sakhalinsky from 1862 to 1881
