= Alexandrovsky =

Alexandrovsky (masculine), Alexandrovskaya (feminine), or Alexandrovskoye (neuter) may refer to:

Geography

- Alexandrovsky District, several districts in Russia
- Alexandrovskoye Urban Settlement, a municipal formation in Alexandrovsky Municipal District which a part of the town of krai significance of Alexandrovsk in Perm Krai, Russia is incorporated as
- Alexandrovsky, Russia (Alexandrovskaya, Alexandrovskoye), several inhabited localities in Russia
- Alexandrovsky Uyezd (disambiguation), several uyezds of the Russian Empire
- Alexandrovskaya Volost (1920–1927), a volost of Alexandrovsky Uyezd of Arkhangelsk Governorate and later of Murmansk Governorate
- Alexandrovskoye, former name of Şəhriyar, Sabirabad, a village in Azerbaijan
- Fort Alexandrovsky, former name of Fort-Shevchenko, Kazakhstan, from 1857 to 1939
- Alexandrovskaya railway station, a railway station in St. Petersburg, Russia
- Aleksandrovskaia, a settlement in Russian America founded in 1787 at present-day Seldovia, Alaska

People

- Ekaterina Alexandrovskaya (2000–2020), Russian-Australian pairs skater
- Stepan Alexandrovsky (1842–1906), Russian painter

Other

- Alexandrovsky (meteorite), a meteorite which fell in Chernihiv, Ukraine in 1900

== See also ==
- Alexandrovsky Sad (disambiguation)
