= Novoalexandrovsk (disambiguation) =

Novoalexandrovsk is a town in Stavropol Krai, Russia.

Novoalexandrovsk may also refer to:

- Novoalexandrovsk Urban Settlement, a municipal formation which the Town of Novoalexandrovsk in Novoalexandrovsky District of Stavropol Krai, Russia is incorporated as
- Novoalexandrovsk, name of Zarasai, a town in Lithuania, in 1836–1918

== See also ==
- Novoalexandrovka (disambiguation)
- Novoalexandrovsky (disambiguation)
- Alexandrovsk (disambiguation)
