= Novoalexandrovka =

Novoalexandrovka may refer to:

- Novoalexandrovka, previous name of Melitopol, Ukraine
- Novo-Alexandrovka, previous name of Serebryansk, East Kazakhstan

== See also ==
- Novoalexandrovsk (disambiguation)
- Novoalexandrovsky (disambiguation)
- Alexandrovka (disambiguation)
- Alexandrovsk (disambiguation)
