= Alexandrovsk =

Alexandrovsk may refer to:

== Russia ==
- Alexandrovsk, Murmansk Oblast, a closed administrative-territorial formation
  - Polyarny, Murmansk Oblast, called Alexandrovsk until 1931
- Alexandrovsk, Perm Krai
- Alexandrovsk-Sakhalinsky (town), in Sakhalin Oblast
- Belogorsk, Amur Oblast, called Alexandrovsk until 1931

== Ukraine ==
- Oleksandrivsk, Luhansk Oblast
- Zaporizhzhia, called Alexandrovsk until 1921

== United States ==
- Nanwalek, Alaska, site of the former Russian fortress of Alexandrovsk

== See also ==
- Alexandrovsky District
- Fort-Shevchenko founded as Fort Alexandrovsk, a military-base town on the Caspian Sea
- Alexandrovsk, the former name of Alexandrovskoye, Stavropol Krai
- Alexandrovsk-Grushevsky, name of the city of Shakhty, Rostov Oblast, Russia, in 1881–1921
- Alexandrovka, Russia
- Alexandrovsky, Russia
