= Alexandrovsky District =

Alexandrovsky District is the name of several administrative and municipal districts in Russia. The district names are generally derived from or related to the male first name Alexander.

== Modern districts ==
Location of Orenburg Oblast in Russia

Location of Perm Krai in Russia

Location of Stavropol Krai in Russia

Location of Tomsk Oblast in Russia

Location of Vladimir Oblast in Russia

- Alexandrovsky District, Orenburg Oblast, an administrative and municipal district of Orenburg Oblast
- Alexandrovsky District, a municipal district of Perm Krai, which Alexandrovsk, the town of krai significance, is incorporated as
- Alexandrovsky District, Stavropol Krai, an administrative and municipal district of Stavropol Krai
- Alexandrovsky District, Tomsk Oblast, an administrative and municipal district of Tomsk Oblast
- Alexandrovsky District, Vladimir Oblast, an administrative and municipal district of Vladimir Oblast

== Renamed districts ==
- Alexandrovsky District, in 1927–1931, name of Polyarny District (1927–1960) of Murmansk Okrug of Leningrad Oblast, Russian SFSR, Soviet Union

== See also ==
- Alexandrovsky Uyezd (disambiguation), similar administrative divisions of the Russian Empire and later of the Russian SFSR
