= Mikhail Tukhachevsky =

Russian and Soviet military leader (1893–1937)

Mikhail Tukhachevsky Михаил Тухачевский
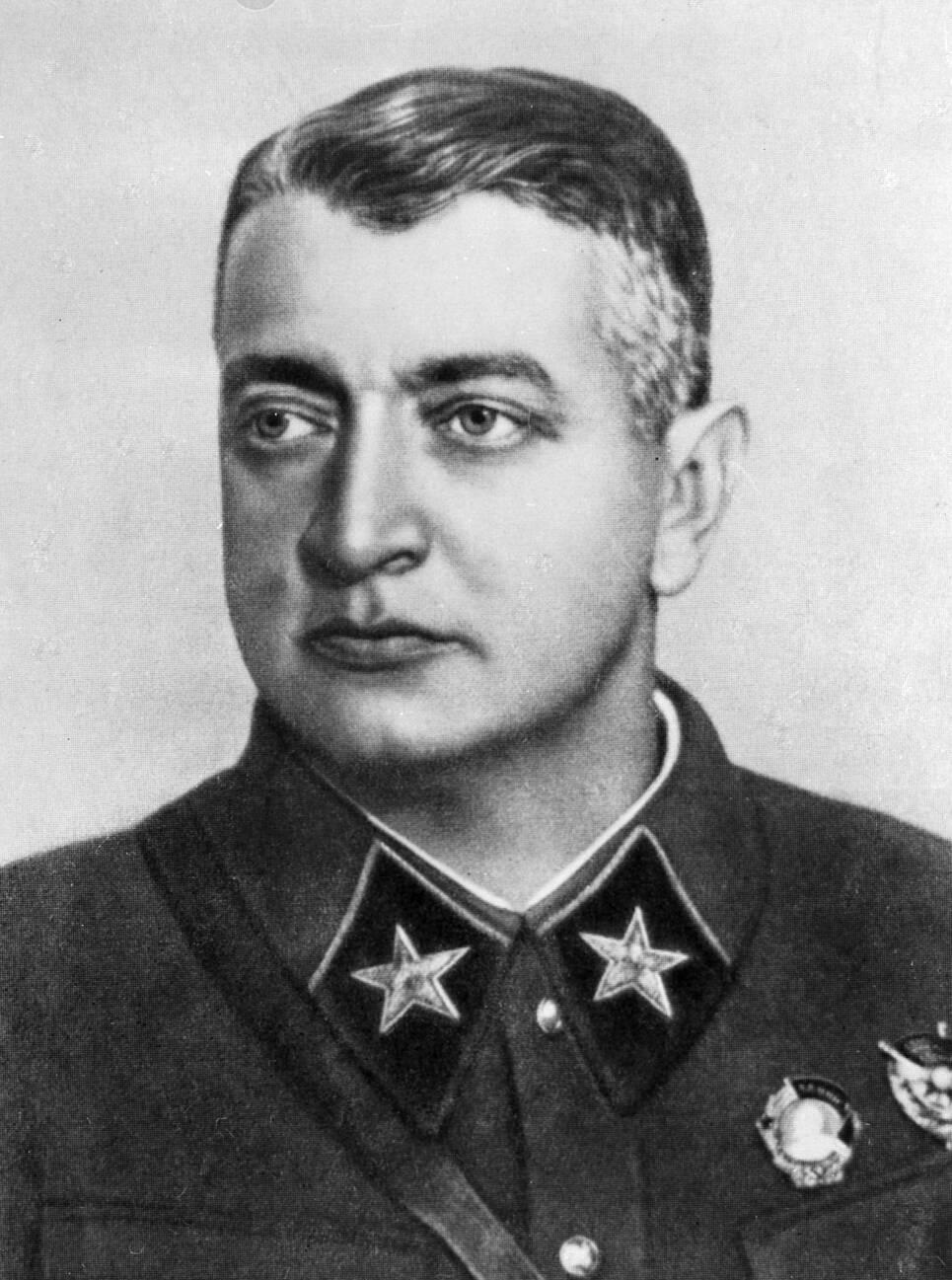
- Tukhachevsky, c. 1935
- Born: 16 February 1893; Aleksandrovskoye, Smolensk Governorate, Russian Empire
- Died: 12 June 1937 (aged 44); Moscow, Soviet Union
- Burial place: Donskoye Cemetery
- Military career
- Allegiance: Russian Empire (1914–1917); Russian SFSR (1918–1922); Soviet Union (1922–1937)
- Branch: Imperial Russian Army; Red Army
- Service years: 1914–1937
- Rank: Second Lieutenant (Imperial Russia); Marshal of the Soviet Union (Red Army)
- Nickname: Red Napoleon
- Commands: Chief of General Staff
- Conflicts: World War I Russian Civil War; Polish–Soviet War

Mikhail Nikolayevich Tukhachevsky (Russian: Михаил Николаевич Тухачевский; 16 February [O.S. 4 February] 1893 – 12 June 1937), nicknamed the Red Napoleon, was a Soviet general who was prominent between 1918 and 1937 as a military officer and theoretician. He was later executed during the Moscow trials of 1936–1938.

He served as an officer in World War I of 1914–1917 and in the Russian Civil War of 1917–1923, leading the defense of the Moscow district (1918), commanding forces on the Eastern Front (1918), commanding the Fifth Army in the recapture of Siberia from Alexander Kolchak, and heading Cossack forces against Anton Denikin (1920). From 1920 to 1921 he commanded the Soviet Western Front in the Polish–Soviet War. Soviet forces under his command successfully repelled the Polish forces from Western Ukraine, driving them back into Poland, but the Red Army suffered defeat outside of Warsaw, and the war ended in a Soviet defeat. Tukhachevsky blamed Joseph Stalin for his defeat at the Battle of Warsaw.

He later served as Chief of Staff of the Red Army from 1925 to 1928, as assistant in the People's Commissariat of Defense after 1934 and as commander of the Volga Military District in 1937. He achieved the rank of Marshal of the Soviet Union in 1935.

As a major proponent of modernisation of Soviet armament and army force structure in the 1920s and 1930s, he became instrumental in the development of Soviet aviation, and of mechanized and airborne forces. As a theoretician, he was a driving force behind the Soviet development of the theory of deep operations in the 1920s and 1930s. Soviet authorities accused Tukhachevsky of treason, and after he confessed during torture, he was executed in 1937 during the military purges of 1936–1938, led by Stalin and Nikolai Yezhov.

== Early life ==
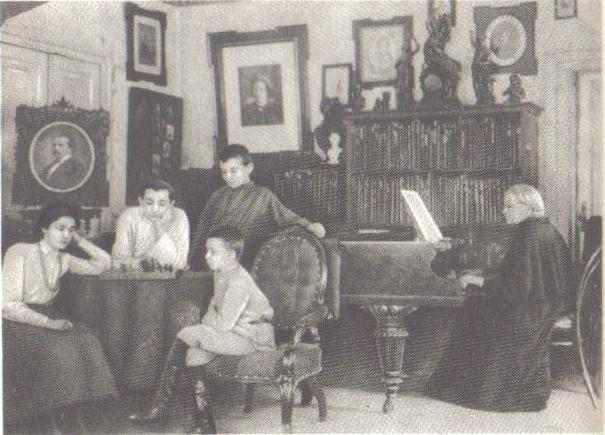
The Tukhachevsky family in 1904

Tukhachevsky was born at Alexandrovskoye, Safonovsky District (in the present-day Smolensk Oblast of Russia), into a family of impoverished hereditary nobles. Legend states that his family descended from a Flemish count who ended up stranded in the East during the Crusades and took a Turkish wife before settling in Russia. His great-grandfather Alexander Tukhachevsky (1793–1831) served as a colonel in the Imperial Russian Army. He was of Russian ethnicity. After attending the Cadet Corps in 1912, he moved on to the Aleksandrovskoye Military School, where he graduated in 1914.

== World War I ==
At the outset of the First World War, he joined the Semyenovsky Guards Regiment (July 1914) as a second lieutenant, declaring:

I am convinced that all that is needed in order to achieve what I want is bravery and self-confidence. I certainly have enough self-confidence.... I told myself that I shall either be a general at thirty, or that I shall not be alive by then.

Taken prisoner by the Imperial German Army in February 1915, Tukhachevsky escaped four times from prisoner-of-war camps and was finally held as an incorrigible escapee in Ingolstadt fortress in Bavaria.

=== Captivity in Ingolstadt ===
Fluent in French, there he met journalist Remy Roure and shared a cell with Captain Charles de Gaulle. Tukhachevsky played his violin, assailed nihilist beliefs and spoke against Christians and Jews, whom he called dogs who "spread their fleas throughout the world". Later in various works he made Russians familiar with De Gaulle's military thinking. Roure, under the pseudonym of Pierre Fervacque, wrote about his encounter with Tukhachevsky. He reported that Tukhachevsky highly praised Napoleon, and also in a certain conversation, Tukhachevsky said he hated Jews for bringing Christianity and the "morality of capital" to Russia. Roure then asked him if he was a socialist, and he replied:

Socialist? Certainly not! What a need for classification you have! Besides, the great socialists are Jews and the socialist doctrine is a branch of universal Christianity. I laugh at money, and whether the land is divided up or not is all one to me. The barbarians, my ancestors, lived in common, but they had chiefs. No, I detest socialists, Jews, and Christians.

According to Roure, Tukhachevsky said that he would follow Lenin only if he "de-europeanised and threw Russia into barbarism", but feared Lenin would not do that. After ranting about how he could use Marxism as a justification to secure the territorial aims of the tsars and cement Russia's position as a world power, he laughed and said he was only joking. Roure said the laugh had an ironic and despairing tone.

On another occasion, following the February Revolution, Roure observed Tukhachevsky carving a "scary idol from colored cardboard", with "burning eyes", a "gaping mouth", and a "bizarre and terrible nose". He inquired about its purpose, to which Tukhachevsky responded:

"This is Perun. A powerful person. This is the god of war and death." And Mikhail knelt down before him with comic seriousness. I burst out laughing. "Don't laugh," he said, getting up from his knees. – I told you that the Slavs need a new religion. They are given Marxism, but there is too much modernism and civilization in this theology. (...) There is Dazhbog – the god of the Sun, Stribog – the god of the Wind, Veles – the god of arts and poetry, and finally, Perun – the god of thunder and lightning. After some deliberation, I settled on Perun, since Marxism, having won in Russia, will unleash merciless wars between people. I will honor Perun every day."

— Remy Roure

Tukhachevsky's apparent neopaganism was also corroborated by another prisoner at Ingolstadt, Nikolay Alexandrovich Tsurikov, who recalled that he once saw a "scarecrow" in the corner of Tukhachevsky's cell, and upon asking him as to what it was, Tukhachevsky responded (to what Tsurikov interpreted as heavy sarcasm), that it was an effigy of Yarilo (the Slavic god of vegetation, fertility and springtime), which he had created during Shrovetide.

Tukhachevsky never denied and later even confirmed those stories about his imprisonment in Germany, but always said that he was politically immature in 1917 and greatly regretted his early views. In France 1936, when confronted with what Roure wrote about him, he said that he had read his book and stated the following:

I was still very young... a novice at politics, and all I knew about revolutions was the last phase of the citizens' revolution in France: the Bonapartism whose military triumphs filled me with boundless admiration. (...) I never think of my views at Ingolstadt without regretting them, since they could cause doubts about my devotion to the Soviet motherland. I'm taking advantage of our reunion to tell you my true feelings.

Whether or not Tukhachevsky really gave up on his old views, the assertion that he was a fully-fledged Bolshevik by the time he joined them is considered to be most likely not true.

Tukhachevsky's fifth escape met with success, and after crossing the Swiss-German border and carrying with him some small pagan idols, he returned to Russia in September 1917. After the October Revolution in 1917, Tukhachevsky joined the Bolsheviks and went on to play a key role in the Red Army despite his noble ancestry.

== Russian Civil War ==
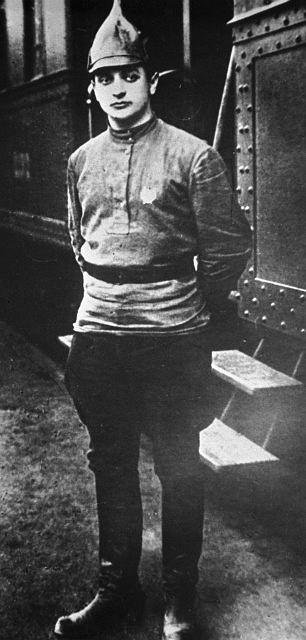
Tukhachevsky in 1920

Tukhachevsky became an officer in the newly-established Red Army and rapidly advanced in rank because of his great ability. During the Russian Civil War, he was given responsibility for defending Moscow. The Bolshevik Defence Commissar, Leon Trotsky, gave Tukhachevsky command of the 5th Army in 1919, and he led the campaign to capture Siberia from the anticommunist White forces of Aleksandr Kolchak. Tukhachevsky used concentrated attacks to exploit the enemy's open flanks and threaten them with envelopment.

According to Tukhachevsky's close confidant Leonid Sabaneyev, when Tukhachevsky was in the service of the Military Department of the All-Russian Central Executive Committee in 1918, in his last overt display of neopaganism, Tukhachevsky drew up a project for destruction of Christianity and restoration of Slavic paganism. To that end, Tukhachevsky submitted a memo on declaring paganism as the state religion of Soviet Russia, which although mocked, also received some serious discussion in the Small Council of People's Commissars, which commended Tukhachevsky for his "joke" and his commitment to atheism. Sabaneyev observed that Tukhachevsky seemed "as happy as a schoolboy who had just succeeded in a prank."

Tukhachevsky also helped defeat General Anton Denikin in the Crimea in 1920, conducting the final operations. In February 1920, he launched an offensive into the Kuban and used cavalry to disrupt the enemy's rear. In the retreat that followed, Denikin's force disintegrated, and Novorossiysk was evacuated hastily.

In the final stage of the Civil War, Tukhachevsky commanded the 7th Army during the suppression of the Kronstadt rebellion in March 1921. He also commanded the assault against the Tambov Republic between 1921 and 1922.

== Polish–Soviet War ==
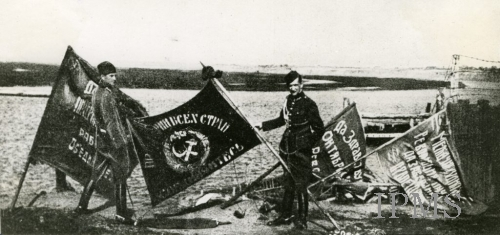
Polish soldiers displaying captured Soviet battle flags after the Battle of Warsaw in 1920

Tukhachevsky commanded the Soviet invasion of Poland during the Polish–Soviet War in 1920. In the lead-up to hostilities, he concentrated his troops near Vitebsk, which he theatrically dubbed, "The Gates of Smolensk". When he issued his troops orders to cross the border, Tukhachevsky said, "The fate of world revolution is being decided in the west: the way leads over the corpse of Poland to a universal conflagration.... On to Wilno, Minsk, and Warsaw – forward!"

According to Richard M. Watt, "The boldness of Tukhachevsky's drive westward was the key to his success. The Soviet High Command dispatched 60,000 men as reinforcements, but Tukhachevsky never stopped to let them catch up. His onrushing armies were leaving behind greater numbers of stragglers every day, but Tukhachevsky ignored these losses. His supply services were in chaos and his rear scarcely existed as an organized entity, but Tukhachevsky was unconcerned; his men would live off the land. On the day his troops captured Minsk, a new cry arose – 'Give us Warsaw!' Tukhachevsky was determined to give them what they wanted. All things considered, Tukhachevsky's performance was a virtuoso display of energy, determination, and, indeed, rashness."

In the summer of 1920, Tukhachevsky successfully pushed back the joint Polish-Ukrainian army of Piłsudski and Petliura that had conquered Kiev in May. However, his armies were defeated by Piłsudski in the Battle of Warsaw shortly after. It was during the Polish war that Tukhachevsky first came into conflict with Joseph Stalin. Both blamed each other for the Soviet failure to capture Warsaw. Tukhachevsky later lamented:

There can be no doubt that if we had been victorious on the Vistula, the revolutionary fires would have reached the entire continent.

His book about the war was translated into Polish and published, together with a book by Piłsudski.

== Reform of the Red Army ==
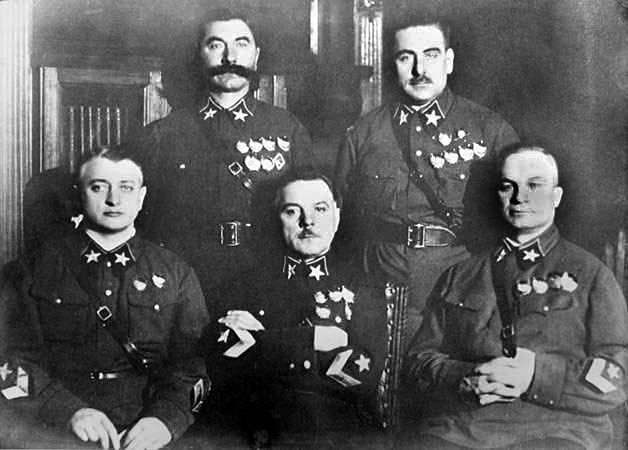
Tukhachevsky with the other first four Marshals of the Soviet Union in November 1935. (l–r): Tukhachevsky, Semyon Budyonny, Kliment Voroshilov, Vasily Blyukher, and Aleksandr Yegorov. Only Budyonny and Voroshilov survived the Great Purge.

Tukhachevsky fervently criticised the Red Army's performance during the 1926 Summer manoeuvres. He criticised the officers' inability to determine what course of action to take and communicate that with their troops especially harshly. Tukhachevsky noted that initiative among officers was lacking, that they responded slowly to changes in the situation and that communication was poor. That was not purely the officers' fault, as the only way of communication from local unit headquarters to the field positions was a single telephone line. In contrast, German divisions that mobilised shortly after during the interwar period had telephones, radio, horse, cycle and motorcycle messengers, signal lights and flags and pieces of cloth, and messages were conveyed mostly to aircraft.

Tukhachevsky reached the position of First Deputy Commissar for defence to Defence Commisar Kliment Voroshilov. Voroshilov disliked Tukhachevsky and would later be one of the initiators of the Great Purge in which Tukhachevsky was executed. According to Georgy Zhukov, it was Tukhachevsky, not Voroshilov, who ran the ministry in practice. Voroshilov disliked Tukhachevsky, but his perception of military doctrine was impacted significantly by Tukhachevsky's ideas.

According to Simon Sebag Montefiore, Stalin regarded Tukhachevsky as his most bitter rival and dubbed him Napoleonchik (little Napoleon). Upon Stalin's ascension to the party leadership in 1929, he began receiving denunciations from senior officers who disapproved of Tukhachevsky's tactical theories. In 1930, the Joint State Political Directorate forced two officers to testify that Tukhachevsky was plotting to overthrow the Politburo via a coup d'état.

According to Montefiore:

In 1930, this was perhaps too outrageous even for the Bolsheviks. Stalin, not yet dictator, probed his powerful ally Sergo Ordzhonikidze: "Only Molotov, myself, and now you are in the know.... Is it possible? What a business! Discuss it with Molotov...". However, Sergo would not go that far. There would be no arrest and trial of Tukhachevsky in 1930: the commander "turns out to be 100% clean," Stalin wrote disingenuously to Molotov in October, "That's very good." It is interesting that seven years before the Great Terror, Stalin was testing the same accusations against the same victims – a dress rehearsal for 1937 – but he could not get the support. The archives reveal a fascinating sequel: once he understood the ambitious modernity of Tukhachevsky's strategies, Stalin apologised to him: "Now the question has become clearer to me, I have to agree that my remark was too strong and my conclusions were not right at all."

Tukhachevsky later wrote several books on modern warfare, In 1931, after Stalin had accepted the need for an industrialized military, Tukhachevsky was given a leading role in reforming the army. Tukhachevsky held advanced ideas on military strategy, particularly on the use of tanks and aircraft in combined operations.

Tukhachevsky took a keen interest in the arts and became a political patron and close friend of the composer Dmitri Shostakovich; they met in 1925 and subsequently played music together at Tukhachevsky's home (Tukhachevsky played the violin). In 1936, Shostakovich's music was under attack after Pravda denounced his opera Lady Macbeth of Mtsensk. However, Tukhachevsky intervened with Stalin on his friend's behalf. After Tukhachevsky's arrest, pressure was put on Shostakovich to denounce him, but Shostakovich was saved from doing so by the fact that the investigator was himself arrested.

== Theory of deep operation ==
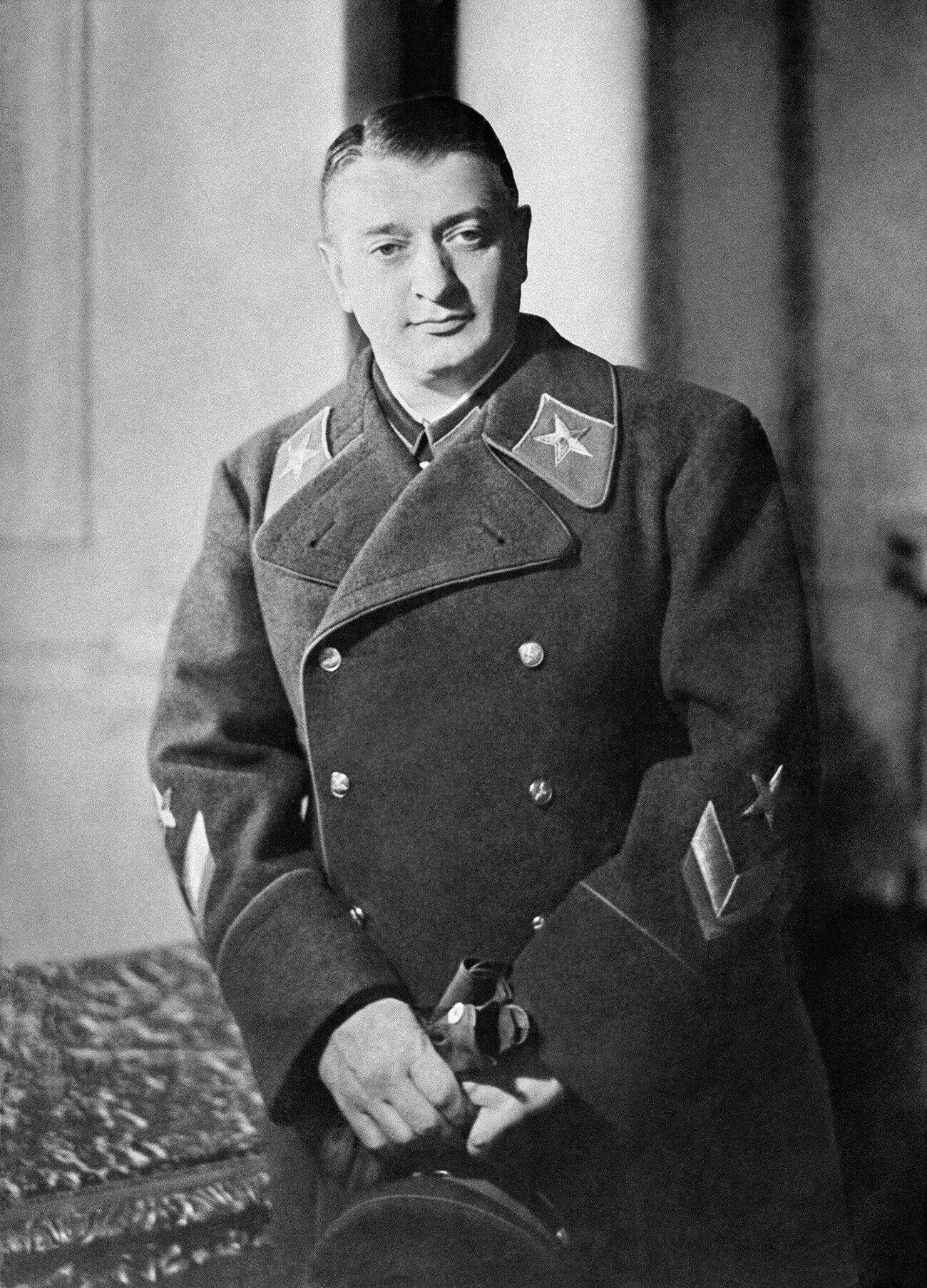
Tukhachevsky in 1936

Tukhachevsky is often credited with the theory of deep operation in which combined arms formations strike deep behind enemy lines to destroy the enemy's rear and logistics, but his exact role is unclear and disputed because of shortage of firsthand sources, and his published works containing only limited amounts of theory on the subject. The theories were opposed by some in the military establishment but were largely adopted by the Red Army in the mid-1930s. They were expressed as a concept in the Red Army's Field Regulations of 1929 and more fully developed in the 1935 Instructions on Deep Battle. The concept was finally codified into the army in 1936 in the Provisional Field Regulations of 1936. An early example of potential effectiveness of deep operations can be found in the Soviet victory over Japan at the Battle of Khalkhin Gol in which a Soviet Corps under the command of Zhukov defeated a substantial Japanese force in August and September 1939 in Nomonhan.

It is often stated that the widespread purges of the Red Army officer corps in 1937 to 1939 made "deep operation" briefly fall from favor. However, it was certainly a major part of Soviet doctrine after its efficacy was demonstrated by the Battle of Khalkhin Gol and the success of similar German operations in Poland and France. The doctrine was used with great success during World War II on the Eastern Front in such victories as the Battle of Stalingrad and Operation Bagration.

== Fall and death ==
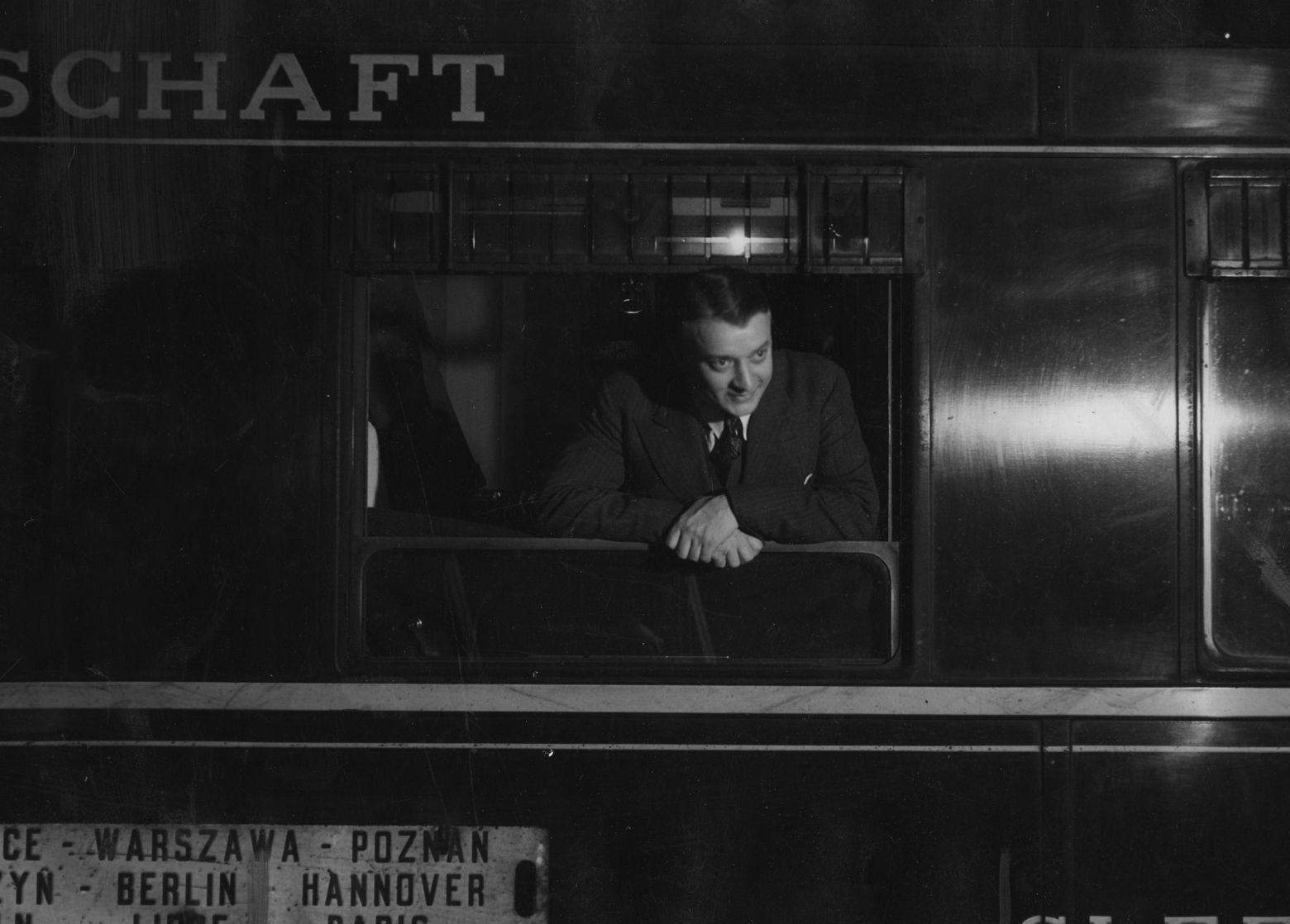
Tukhachevsky at the Warsaw Railway Station, en route to London, 1936

On November 20, 1935, Tukhachevsky was made a Marshal of the Soviet Union when he was 42. In January 1936, Tukhachevsky visited the United Kingdom, France and Germany.

Just before his arrest, Tukhachevsky was relieved of duty as assistant to Marshal Voroshilov and was appointed military commander of the Volga Military District. Shortly after departing to take up his new command, he was secretly arrested on May 22, 1937, and brought back to Moscow in a prison van.

Tukhachevsky's interrogation and torture were directly supervised by NKVD Chief Nikolai Yezhov. Stalin instructed Yezhov, "See for yourself, but Tukhachevsky should be forced to tell everything.... It's impossible he acted alone".

According to Montefiore, a few days later, as Yezhov buzzed in and out of Stalin's office, a broken Tukhachevsky confessed that Avel Yenukidze had recruited him in 1928 and that he was a German agent co-operating with Nikolai Bukharin to seize power. Tukhachevsky's confession, which survives in the archives, is dappled with a brown spray that was later found to be blood-spattered by a body in motion.

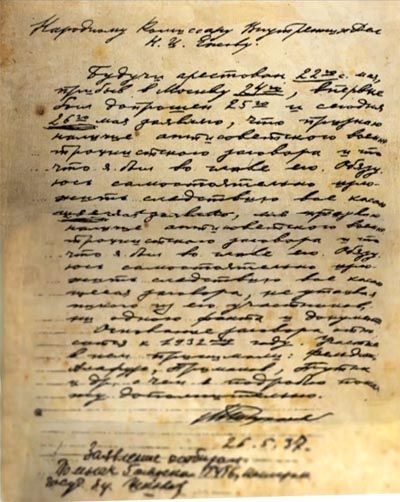
Tukhachevsky's bloodstained confession

Stalin commented, "It's incredible, but it's a fact, they admit it".

On June 11, 1937, the Supreme Court of the Soviet Union convened a special military tribunal to try Tukhachevsky and eight generals for treason. The trial was dubbed the Case of the Trotskyist Anti-Soviet Military Organization. Upon hearing the accusations, Tukhachevsky was heard to say, "I feel I'm dreaming". Most of the judges were also terrified. One was heard to comment, "Tomorrow I'll be put in the same place".

At 11:35 that night, all of the defendants were declared guilty and sentenced to death. Stalin, who was awaiting the verdict with Yezhov, Molotov and Lazar Kaganovich, did not even examine the transcripts. He simply said, "Agreed".

Within the hour, Tukhachevsky was summoned from his cell by NKVD Captain Vasily Blokhin. As Yezhov watched, the former Marshal was shot once in the back of the head.

Immediately afterward, Yezhov was summoned into Stalin's presence. Stalin asked, "What were Tukhachevsky's last words?" Yezhov responded, "The snake said he was dedicated to the Motherland and Comrade Stalin. He asked for clemency. But it was obvious that he was not being straight, he hadn't laid down his arms".

== Aftermath ==
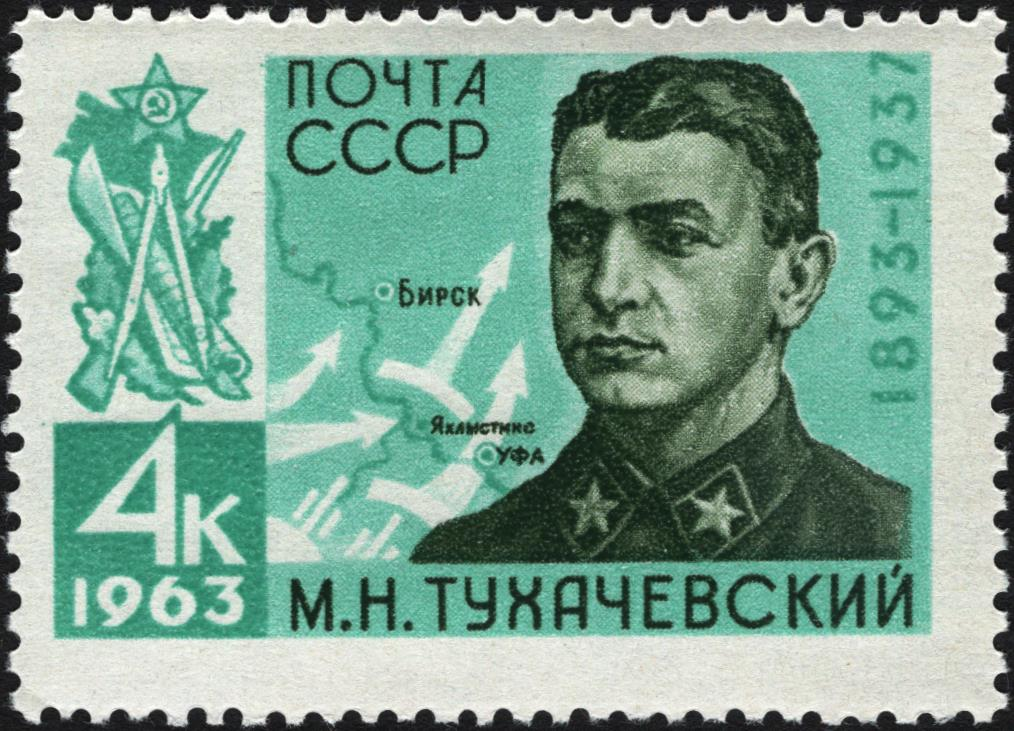
1963 Soviet stamp featuring Tukhachevsky

Tukhachevsky's family members all suffered after his execution. His wife, Nina Tukhachevskaya, and his brothers Alexandr and Nikolai, both of whom were instructors in a Soviet military academy, were shot. Three of his sisters were sent to the Gulag. His daughter Svetlana, aged 15 when he was executed, lived in the Nizhneisetsky orphanage in Sverdlovsk (now Yekaterinburg) and then the Gulag until the Khrushchev Thaw. She moved to Moscow afterwards and died in 1982.

"To the Red army, Stalin has dealt a fearful blow. As a result of the latest judicial frameup, it has fallen several cubits in stature. The interests of the Soviet defense have been sacrificed in the interests of the self-preservation of the ruling clique."

— Trotsky on the Red Army purges of 1937.

Leon Trotsky described Tukhachevsky posthumously as an "outstanding talent" for his strategic skills and viewed the purge of the Red Army by the Stalinist bureaucracy as a means of preserving its political position.

Before Nikita Khrushchev's Secret Speech in 1956, Tukhachevsky was officially considered a fascist and fifth columnist. Soviet diplomats and supporters in the West enthusiastically promulgated this opinion. Then, on January 31, 1957, Tukhachevsky and his codefendants were declared innocent of all charges and were rehabilitated.

Although Tukhachevsky's prosecution is almost universally regarded as a sham, Stalin's motivations continue to be debated. In his 1968 book The Great Terror, the British historian Robert Conquest accuses Nazi Party leaders Heinrich Himmler and Reinhard Heydrich of forging documents that implicated Tukhachevsky in an anti-Stalinist conspiracy with the Wehrmacht General Staff, to weaken the Soviets' defence capacity. The documents, Conquest said, were leaked to President Edvard Beneš of Czechoslovakia, who passed them to the Soviet Union through diplomatic channels. Conquest's thesis of an SS conspiracy to frame Tukhachevsky was based upon the memoirs of Walter Schellenberg and Beneš.

In 1989, the Politburo of the Communist Party of the Soviet Union announced that new evidence had been found in Stalin's archives indicating German intelligence's intentions to fabricate disinformation about Tukhachevsky with the goal of eliminating him. "Knowledge of personal characteristics of Stalin – like paranoia and extreme suspicion, had been possibly highest factor in it."

According to the opinion of Igor Lukes, who conducted a study on the matter, it was Stalin, Kaganovich and Yezhov who actually concocted Tukhachevsky's "treason" themselves. At Yezhov's order, the NKVD had instructed a known double agent, Nikolai Skoblin, to leak to Heydrich's Sicherheitsdienst (SD) concocted information suggesting a plot by Tukhachevsky and the other Soviet generals against Stalin.

Seeing an opportunity to strike a blow at the Soviet military, Heydrich immediately acted on the information and undertook to improve on it. Heydrich's forgeries were later leaked to the Soviets via Beneš and other neutral nations. While the SD believed that it had successfully fooled Stalin into executing his best generals, in reality, it had merely served as an unwitting pawn of the Soviet NKVD. Ironically, Heydrich's forgeries were never used at trial. Instead, Soviet prosecutors relied on signed "confessions" beaten out of the defendants.

In 1956, the NKVD defector Aleksandr Mikhailovich Orlov published an article in Life with "The Sensational Secret Behind the Damnation of Stalin" as title. The story held that NKVD agents had discovered papers in the tsarist Okhrana archives proving Stalin had once been an informer. From this knowledge, the NKVD agents had planned a coup d'état with Tukhachevsky and other senior officers in the Red Army. According to Orlov, Stalin uncovered the conspiracy and used Yezhov to execute those responsible. The article lists the Eremin letter as documentary evidence that Stalin was part of the Okhrana, but most historians agree that it is a forgery.

Simon Sebag Montefiore, who has conducted extensive research in Soviet archives, states:

Stalin needed neither Nazi disinformation nor mysterious Okhrana files to persuade him to destroy Tukhachevsky. After all, he had played with the idea as early as 1930, three years before Hitler took power. Furthermore, Stalin and his cronies were convinced that officers were to be distrusted and physically exterminated at the slightest suspicion. He reminisced to Voroshilov, in an undated note, about the officers arrested in the summer of 1918. "These officers," he said, "we wanted to shoot en masse." Nothing had changed.

It has been speculated that the reason that Stalin had Tukhachevsky and other high-ranking generals executed was to remove a potential threat to his political power. Ultimately, Stalin and Yezhov would orchestrate the arrest and execution of thousands of Soviet military officers as well as five of the eight generals who presided over Tukhachevsky's show trial.

While at the time of his death the Red Army was still firmly in the grip of the cavalry, Tukhachevsky had changed the Red Army's mentality quite significantly. While many machine-gunners were being arrested and Marshal Budyonny spoke in favour of cavalry, influential people, even including Marshal Voroshilov, under whom Tukhachevsky served and who took part in the arrests, began to question the cavalry's position inside the Red Army. The horse remained ingrained in the Red Army, however. In peacetime, cavalry made sense to the Red Army; it was effective in smaller actions and internal security actions, many horse riders were available without requiring significant training, and there were the memories of the effectiveness of cavalry during the Civil War, all of which helped the horse in maintaining its central position inside the Red Army. When the Second World War began mixed units were set up, which included both cavalry and tanks; these played a central role in use of the deep operations doctrine during WWII.

== Honours and awards ==
Imperial awards

- Order of St. Anne, 2nd class with swords, also awarded 3rd class with swords and bow; and 4th class with the inscription "For Courage"
- Order of St. Stanislaus, 2nd class with swords, also awarded 3rd class with swords and bow
- Order of St. Vladimir, 4th class with swords

Soviet awards

- Order of Lenin (21 February 1933)
- Order of the Red Banner (August 7, 1919)
- Honorary revolutionary weapon (December 17, 1919)

Military offices
Preceded by Sergey Kamenev	Chief of the Staff of the Red Army; November 1925 – May 1928	Succeeded by Boris Shaposhnikov
