= Novoalexandrovsky (rural locality) =

Name of several Russian rural localities

Novoalexandrovsky (Russian: Новоалекса́ндровский; masculine), Novoalexandrovskaya (Новоалекса́ндровская; feminine), or Novoalexandrovskoye (Новоалекса́ндровское; neuter) is the name of several rural localities in Russia.

== Kaluga Oblast ==
As of 2010, one rural locality in Kaluga Oblast bears this name:

- Novoalexandrovsky, Kaluga Oblast, a khutor in Spas-Demensky District

== Rostov Oblast ==
As of 2010, four rural localities in Rostov Oblast bear this name:

- Novoalexandrovsky, Kuybyshevsky District, Rostov Oblast, a khutor in Kuybyshevskoye Rural Settlement of Kuybyshevsky District
- Novoalexandrovsky, Matveyevo-Kurgansky District, Rostov Oblast, a khutor in Novonikolayevskoye Rural Settlement of Matveyevo-Kurgansky District
- Novoalexandrovsky, Millerovsky District, Rostov Oblast, a khutor in Voloshinskoye Rural Settlement of Millerovsky District
- Novoalexandrovsky, Zernogradsky District, Rostov Oblast, a khutor in Gulyay-Borisovskoye Rural Settlement of Zernogradsky District

== Stavropol Krai ==
As of 2010, two rural localities in Stavropol Krai bear this name:

- Novoalexandrovsky, Stavropol Krai, a khutor in Alexandriysky Selsoviet of Blagodarnensky District
- Novoalexandrovskoye, a selo in Pokoynensky Selsoviet of Budyonnovsky District

== Volgograd Oblast ==
As of 2010, one rural locality in Volgograd Oblast bears this name:

- Novoalexandrovsky, Volgograd Oblast, a khutor in Zimnyatsky Selsoviet of Serafimovichsky District
