= Remy Roure =

French journalist

Rémy Roure (French pronunciation: [ʁemi ʁuʁ]; October 30, 1885 - November 8, 1966) was a French journalist and a resistance fighter in WW2. He was deported to Buchenwald concentration camp in 1944. He worked for several newspapers, like Le Monde, Le Figaro and the Swiss Le Temps, sometimes writing under the pseudonym of Pierre Fervacque.

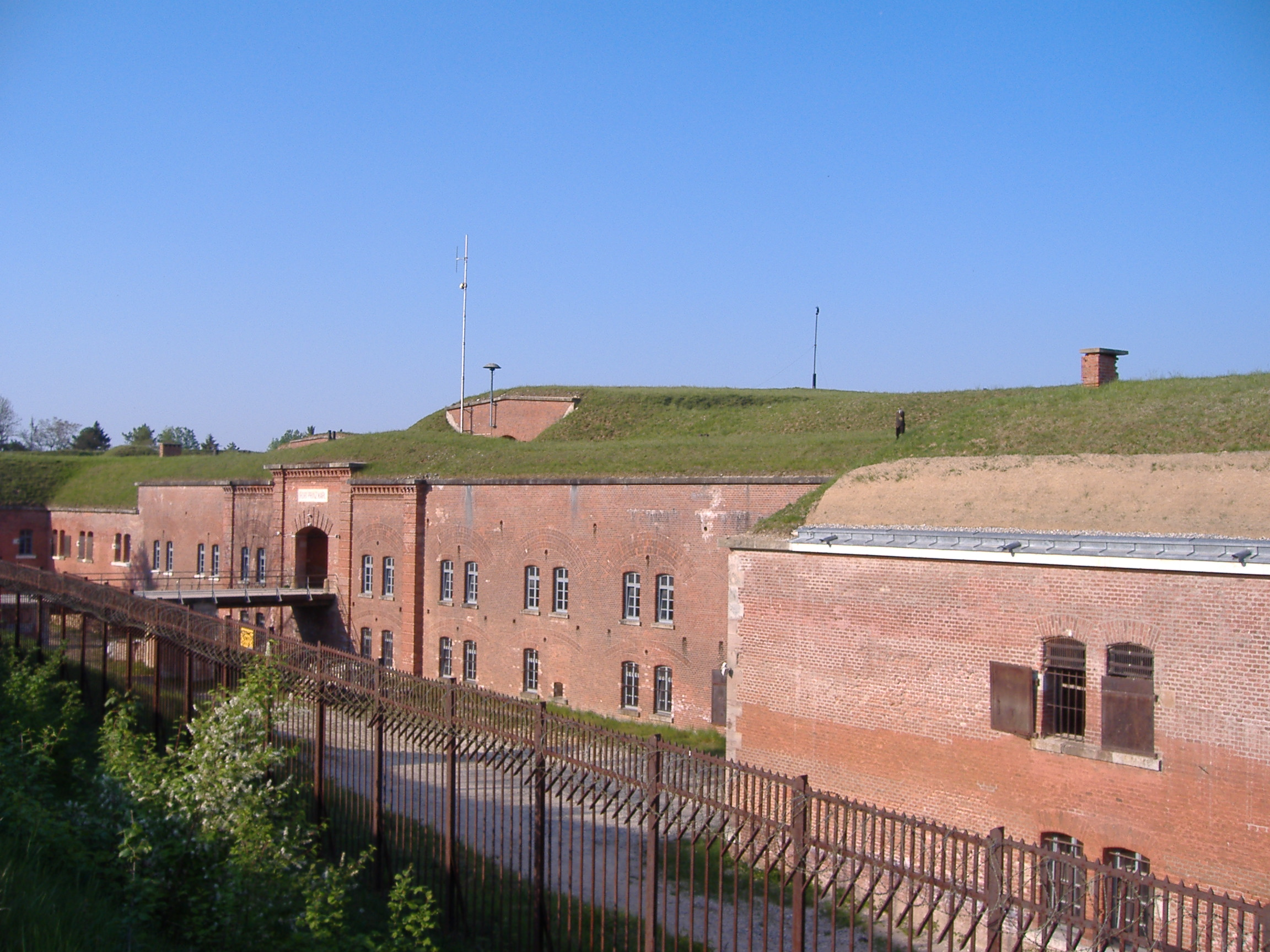
Prince Karl Fort, Ingolstadt Fortress. During the First World War, prisoners of war, like Roure and De Gaulle, were held there.

== Life ==
Remy Roure fought in World War One, and was taken prisoner and escaped several times. During his captivity at the fort of Ingolstadt in Bavaria, he met two other prisoners in 1917: Charles de Gaulle and Mikhail Tukhachevsky, future Soviet marshal executed in the Great Purge in 1937.

During World War II, he joined the Resistance very early on. With General Cochet and François de Menthon he founded the Liberté movement, of which he became a member of the management committee. Member of Combat resistance movement, he is in favor of a rapprochement between this movement and General de Gaulle. Roure was also a member of an Allied pilot recovery network, Bordeaux-Loupiac, while continuing to write in Le Temps, an activity which served as his cover. On October 11, 1943, while he was transporting American pilots to Rennes, he was arrested by the Gestapo, following a denunciation. He tried to escape but was seriously wounded by gunshot during his attempt while his ally Jean-Claude Camors, was shot dead.

Almost dying - he severed his femoral artery - Roure received treatment and survived. Four days later he was interned in Fresnes Prison, where he was beaten and tortured. On April 27, 1944, he was deported to Germany, to Auschwitz at first, and then to Buchenwald where he arrived on May 14, 1944. Eventually he was released by allied forces on April 11, 1945. His wife, Helene Roure, died in the Ravensbrück camp, one month before the end of the war, on March 31, 1945.

He was a delegate to the Provisional Consultative Assembly, an organization formed by the various French resistance groups, from July 24 to August 3, 1945.

At the end of the war, Roure gained the "Order of Liberation”.

After the liberation, he was part of the team of former members of the Popular Democratic Party (PDP) who refused the transformation of the PDP into a Popular Republican Movement (the PRM), choosing to form a new Democratic Party (PD), which joined the coalition Rally of Republican Lefts. The PD merged in 1946, after a few months of existence, with the Democratic and Socialist Union of the Resistance (UDSR).

== Books ==
• Les Demi-Vivants (under the name of Pierre Fervacque), Fasquelle, Paris 1928

• The leader of the Red Army Michaël Toukhatchevski (under the name of Pierre Fervacque), Fasquelle, Paris 1928

• The proud life of Trotsky, (under the name of Pierre Fervacque), Fasquelle, Paris 1929

• L'Alsace minée or De Autonomisme alsacien, (under the name of Pierre Fervacque), Fasquelle, Paris 1929

• L'Alsace et le Vatican (under the name of Pierre Fervacque ), Fasquelle, Paris 1930

• Anaïs, petite vivaroise, (under the name of Pierre Fervacque), Ramlot & Cie, Paris 1930

• Le Secret d'Azeff, (with Pierre Tugal), editions of the "Nouvelle Revue critique", Paris 1930.

• Free Pages. The 4th Republic: birth and abortion of a regime (1945-1946), Le Monde (Impr. Du "Monde"), Paris 1948
