= Kievsky Yogan =

River in Siberia, Russia

Kievsky Yogan Киевский Ёган / Ки́евскэл кыге́
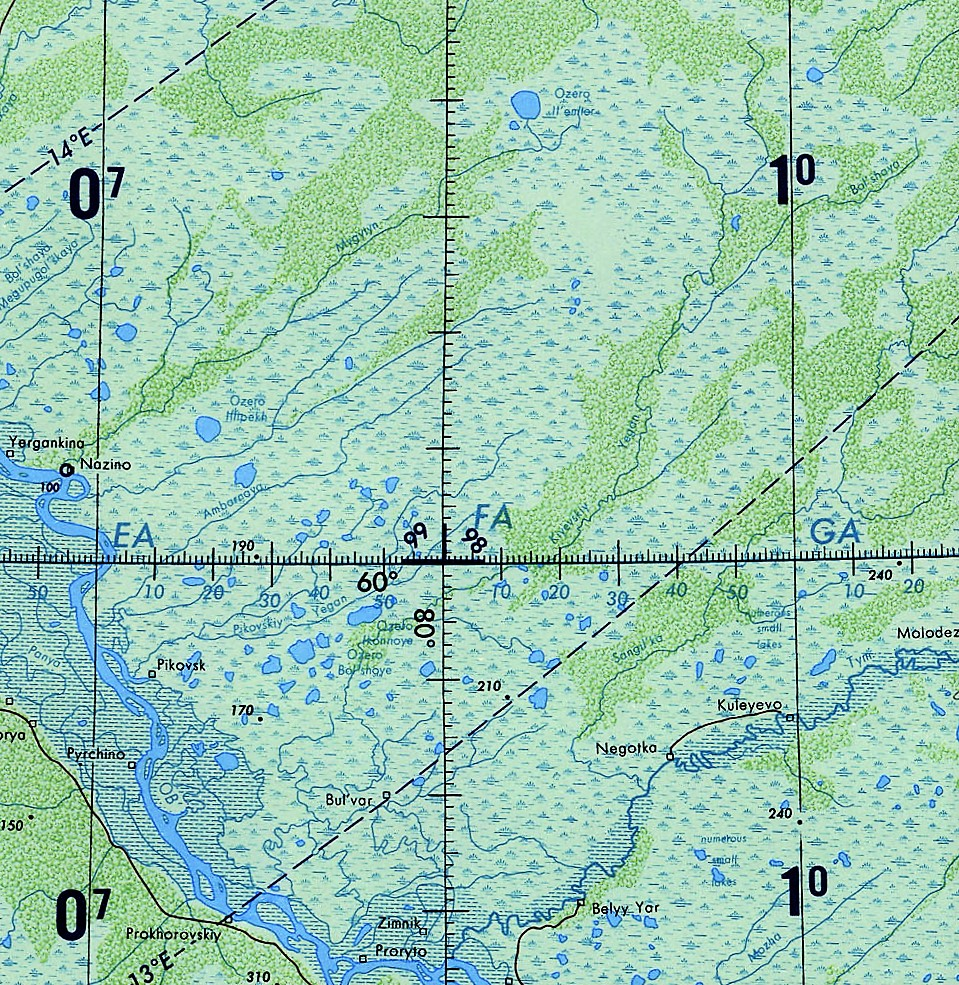
- Course of the Kievsky Yogan ONC map section

- Mouth location in Tomsk Oblast, Russia

Location
- Country: Russia

Physical characteristics
- Source: Central Siberian Plateau
  - coordinates: 60°44′13″N 80°26′08″E
  - elevation: 98 m (322 ft)
- Mouth: Ob
  - location: Kyev canal
  - coordinates: 59°40′44″N 79°35′13″E
  - elevation: 42 m (138 ft)
- Length: 339 km (211 mi)
- Basin size: 4,140 km^{2} (1,600 sq mi)
- Discharge
  - average: 250 m^{3}/s (8,800 cu ft/s)

Basin features
- Progression: Ob→ Kara Sea

The Kievsky Yogan (Russian: Киевский Ёган; Selkup: Ки́евскэл кыге́) is a river in Tomsk Oblast, Russia. The river is 339 kilometres (211 mi) long and has a catchment area of 4,140 square kilometres (1,600 sq mi).

The Kievsky Yogan flows across the Central Siberian Plateau. Its basin is located in the Alexandrovsky District. There are no permanent settlements along the course of the river.

== Course ==
The Kievsky Yogan is a right tributary of the Ob river. It flows in a roughly SSW direction along a very swampy area. In its lower reaches there are numerous lakes. Finally it meets an arm of the Ob, the Kiev Channel (проток Киевская), 68 km (42 mi) from its mouth in the right bank of the Ob.

=== Tributaries ===
The main tributary of the Kievsky Yogan is the 77 km (48 mi) long Bolshaya (Большая) on the left. The river is fed by snow and rain.

== See also ==
- List of rivers of Russia
