= Novoalexandrovsky =

Novoalexandrovsky (masculine), Novoalexandrovskaya (feminine), or Novoalexandrovskoye (neuter) may refer to:

- Novoalexandrovsky District, a district of Stavropol Krai, Russia
- Novoalexandrovsky (rural locality) (Novoalexandrovskaya, Novoalexandrovskoye), several rural localities in Russia
