= Alexandrovskoye, Bryansk Oblast =

Alexandrovskoye Александровское
- Selo
- Location within Bryansk Oblast Location within Russia
- Coordinates: 52°38′N 34°35′E
- Country: Russia
- Region: Bryansk Oblast
- District: Brasovsky District
- Time zone: UTC+3:00

Alexandrovskoye (Russian: Александровское) is a rural locality (a selo) in Brasovsky District, Bryansk Oblast, Russia. Its population was 17 as of 2013. It has two streets.

== Geography ==
Alexandrovskoye is located 23 km north of Lokot (the district's administrative centre) by road. Pogreby is the nearest rural locality.
