= Novoalexandrovsky, Volgograd Oblast =

Novoalexandrovsky Новоалександровский
- Khutor
- Location within Volgograd Oblast Location within Russia
- Coordinates: 49°37′N 42°42′E
- Country: Russia
- Region: Volgograd Oblast
- District: Serafimovichsky District
- Time zone: UTC+4:00

Novoalexandrovsky (Russian: Новоалександровский) is a rural locality (a khutor) in Zimnyatskoye Rural Settlement, Serafimovichsky District, Volgograd Oblast, Russia. The population was 137 as of 2010. There are 3 streets.

== Geography ==
Novoalexandrovsky is located in steppe, on the left bank of the Protok River, 6 km north of Serafimovich (the district's administrative centre) by road. Berezki is the nearest rural locality.
