= Alexandrovsky Uyezd =

Alexandrovsky Uyezd (Russian: Алекса́ндровский уе́зд) may refer to several territorial divisions with the same name in the Russian Empire and, later, Soviet Russia:

- Alexandrovsky Uyezd, Arkhangelsk Governorate
- Alexandrovsky Uyezd, Vladimir Governorate
- Alexandrovsky Uyezd, Yekaterinoslav Governorate
