= Alexandrovsky, Republic of Bashkortostan =

Alexandrovsky Александровский
- Khutor
- Location within Bashkortostan Location within Russia
- Coordinates: 52°44′N 55°58′E
- Country: Russia
- Region: Bashkortostan
- District: Kuyurgazinsky District
- Time zone: UTC+5:00

Alexandrovsky (Russian: Александровский) is a rural locality (a khutor) in Krivle-Ilyushkinsky Selsoviet, Kuyurgazinsky District, Bashkortostan, Russia. The population was 3 as of 2010. There is 1 street.

== Geography ==
Alexandrovsky is located 26 km northeast of Yermolayevo (the district's administrative centre) by road. Kuznetsovsky is the nearest rural locality.
