= Alexandrovsky Uyezd, Vladimir Governorate =

Subdivision in the Russian Empire and Soviet Union (1778–1929)

Alexandrovsky Uyezd (Александровский уезд) was one of the subdivisions of Vladimir Governorate in the Russian Empire and later the Russian Soviet Federative Socialist Republic from 1778 until 1929. It was situated in the western part of the governorate. Its administrative centre was Alexandrov.

== Demographics ==
At the time of the Russian Empire Census of 1897, Alexandrovsky Uyezd had a population of 100,371. Of these, 99.6% spoke Russian, 0.1% Polish, 0.1% Ukrainian, 0.1% Yiddish and 0.1% German as their native language.
