= Alexandrovskoye, Alexandrovsky District, Tomsk Oblast =

Alexandrovskoye Александровское
- Selo
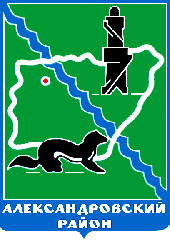
- Coat of arms
- Interactive map of Alexandrovskoye
- Location of Alexandrovskoye Alexandrovskoye (Tomsk Oblast)
- Coordinates: 60°25′43″N 77°51′57″E
- Country: Russia
- Federal subject: Tomsk Oblast
- Administrative district: Alexandrovsky District
- Founded: 1924
- Elevation: 149 m (489 ft)

Population (2010 Census)
  - Total: 7,211
  - Estimate (2021): 6,586 (−8.7%)

Administrative status
  - Capital of: Alexandrovsky District
- Time zone: UTC+7 (MSK+4)
- Postal code: 636760
- OKTMO ID: 69604410101

Alexandrovskoye (Russian: Алекса́ндровское) is a rural locality (a selo) and the administrative center of Alexandrovsky District of Tomsk Oblast, Russia, located on the Ob River. Population: 7,211 (2010 census); 7,976 (2002 census); 8,399 (1989 Soviet census).

== Climate ==
Alexandrovskoye has a subarctic climate (Köppen climate classification Dfc), with long, severely cold winters and short, warm summers. Precipitation is moderate and is somewhat higher in summer than at other times of the year.

Climate data for Alexandrovskoye, Alexandrovsky District, Tomsk Oblast (1991–2020, extremes 1932–present)
| Month | Jan | Feb | Mar | Apr | May | Jun | Jul | Aug | Sep | Oct | Nov | Dec | Year |
|---|---|---|---|---|---|---|---|---|---|---|---|---|---|
| Record high °C (°F) | 2.2 (36.0) | 5.0 (41.0) | 12.7 (54.9) | 24.5 (76.1) | 33.5 (92.3) | 36.1 (97.0) | 34.9 (94.8) | 33.1 (91.6) | 29.3 (84.7) | 22.5 (72.5) | 7.6 (45.7) | 3.9 (39.0) | 34.9 (94.8) |
| Mean daily maximum °C (°F) | −16.2 (2.8) | −12.4 (9.7) | −2.6 (27.3) | 5.5 (41.9) | 13.8 (56.8) | 21.3 (70.3) | 23.8 (74.8) | 20.1 (68.2) | 12.9 (55.2) | 3.8 (38.8) | −8.0 (17.6) | −14.0 (6.8) | 4.0 (39.2) |
| Daily mean °C (°F) | −20.5 (−4.9) | −17.3 (0.9) | −8.5 (16.7) | −0.6 (30.9) | 7.3 (45.1) | 15.4 (59.7) | 18.1 (64.6) | 14.5 (58.1) | 7.9 (46.2) | 0.2 (32.4) | −11.7 (10.9) | −18.0 (−0.4) | −1.1 (30.0) |
| Mean daily minimum °C (°F) | −24.7 (−12.5) | −21.7 (−7.1) | −13.4 (7.9) | −5.4 (22.3) | 2.3 (36.1) | 10.2 (50.4) | 12.8 (55.0) | 10.0 (50.0) | 4.2 (39.6) | −2.6 (27.3) | −15.2 (4.6) | −22.2 (−8.0) | −5.5 (22.1) |
| Record low °C (°F) | −52.8 (−63.0) | −51.0 (−59.8) | −41.4 (−42.5) | −33.9 (−29.0) | −19.6 (−3.3) | −3.8 (25.2) | 1.0 (33.8) | −2.5 (27.5) | −8.0 (17.6) | −28.6 (−19.5) | −45.8 (−50.4) | −50.6 (−59.1) | −52.8 (−63.0) |
| Average precipitation mm (inches) | 22 (0.9) | 19 (0.7) | 24 (0.9) | 28 (1.1) | 52 (2.0) | 69 (2.7) | 56 (2.2) | 90 (3.5) | 56 (2.2) | 46 (1.8) | 39 (1.5) | 31 (1.2) | 532 (20.9) |
| Average precipitation days (≥ 1.0 mm) | 6.9 | 5.0 | 4.7 | 7.0 | 7.7 | 11.1 | 9.2 | 10.1 | 10.1 | 11.5 | 10.1 | 8.0 | 101.4 |
| Mean monthly sunshine hours | 46 | 106 | 170 | 215 | 252 | 275 | 304 | 212 | 133 | 72 | 55 | 27 | 1,867 |
Source 1: Pogoda.ru.net
Source 2: NOAA (sun and precipitation days 1961-1990)
