= Alexandrovskoye, Vytegorsky District, Vologda Oblast =

Alexandrovskoye Александровское
- Selo
- Location within Vologda Oblast Location within Russia
- Coordinates: 60°47′N 37°08′E
- Country: Russia
- Region: Vologda Oblast
- District: Vytegorsky District
- Time zone: UTC+3:00

Alexandrovskoye (Russian: Александровское) is a rural locality (a selo) in Annenskoye Rural Settlement, Vytegorsky District, Vologda Oblast, Russia. The population was 22 as of 2002. There are 3 streets.

== Geography ==
Alexandrovskoye is located 52 km southeast of Vytegra (the district's administrative centre) by road. Pavshozero is the nearest rural locality.
