= Alexandrovsky, Fatezhsky District, Kursk Oblast =

Rural locality in Kursk Oblast, Russia

Alexandrovsky Александровский
- Khutor
- Interactive map of Alexandrovsky
- Location of Alexandrovsky Alexandrovsky (Kursk Oblast)
- Coordinates: 51°55′56″N 35°48′52″E
- Country: Russia
- Federal subject: Kursk Oblast
- Administrative district: Fatezhsky District
- SelsovietSelsoviet: Bolshezhirovsky

Population (2010 Census)
  - Total: 6
  - Estimate (2010): 6 (0%)

Municipal status
  - Municipal district: Fatezhsky Municipal District
  - Rural settlement: Bolshezhirovsky Selsoviet Rural Settlement
- Time zone: UTC+3 (MSK)
- Postal code: 307114
- Dialing code: +7 47144
- OKTMO ID: 38644412261
- Website: мобольшежировский.рф

Alexandrovsky (Russian: Александровский) is a rural locality (a khutor) in Bolshezhirovsky Selsoviet Rural Settlement, Fatezhsky District, Kursk Oblast, Russia. Population: 6 (2010 census); 11 (2002 census);

== Geography ==
The khutor is located on the Nikovets Brook (a right tributary of the Ruda in the basin of the Svapa), 91.5 km (56.9 mi) from the Russia–Ukraine border, 34 km (21 mi) north-west of Kursk, 17.5 km (10.9 mi) south-west of the district center – the town Fatezh, and 11 km (6.8 mi) from the selsoviet center – Bolshoye Zhirovo.

Climate

Alexandrovsky has a warm-summer humid continental climate (Dfb in the Köppen climate classification).

== Transport ==
Alexandrovsky is located 10.5 km (6.5 mi) from the federal route M-2 Crimea Highway as part of the European route E105, 33 km (21 mi) from the road of regional importance 38K-018 (Kursk – Ponyri), 13.5 km (8.4 mi) from the road 38K-039 (Fatezh – 38K-018), 500 m (1,600 ft) from the road of intermunicipal significance 38H-221 (M2 "Crimea Highway" – Kromskaya), and 31.5 km (19.6 mi) from the nearest railway halt 433 km (railway line Lgov I — Kursk).

The rural locality is situated 38 km (24 mi) from Kursk Vostochny Airport, 151 km (94 mi) from Belgorod International Airport and 235 km (146 mi) from Voronezh Peter the Great Airport.
