= Alexandrovskoye, Vologodsky District, Vologda Oblast =

Alexandrovskoye Александровское
- Village
- Location within Vologda Oblast Location within Russia
- Coordinates: 59°59′N 39°31′E
- Country: Russia
- Region: Vologda Oblast
- District: Vologodsky District
- Time zone: UTC+3:00

Alexandrovskoye (Russian: Александровское) is a rural locality (a village) in Spasskoye Rural Settlement, Vologodsky District, Vologda Oblast, Russia. The population was 1 as of 2002.

== Geography ==
Alexandrovskoye is located 56 km southwest of Vologda (the district's administrative centre) by road. Dovodchikovo is the nearest rural locality.
