= Alexandrovsky District, Tomsk Oblast =

Alexandrovsky District Александровский район (Russian)
- District
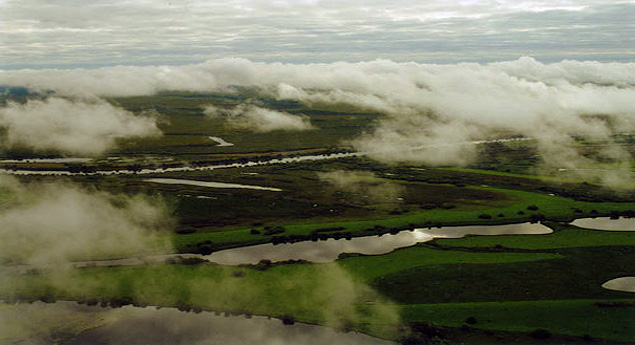
- Panino Reserve, Alexandrovsky District

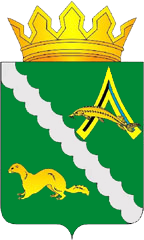
- Coat of arms
- Location of Alexandrovsky District in Tomsk Oblast
- Coordinates: 60°26′N 77°54′E
- Country: Russia
- Federal subject: Tomsk Oblast
- Established: 1923
- Administrative center: Alexandrovskoye

Area
  - Total: 30,160 km^{2} (11,640 sq mi)

Population (2010 Census)
  - Total: 8,686
  - Density: 0.2880/km^{2} (0.7459/sq mi)
  - Urban: 0%
  - Rural: 100%

Administrative structure
  - Inhabited localities: 8 rural localities

Municipal structure
  - Municipally incorporated as: Alexandrovsky Municipal District
  - Municipal divisions: 0 urban settlements, 6 rural settlements
- Time zone: UTC+7 (MSK+4)
- OKTMO ID: 69604000
- Website: http://www.als.tomskinvest.ru/

Alexandrovsky District (Russian: Александровский райо́н) is an administrative and municipal district (raion), one of the sixteen in Tomsk Oblast, Russia. It is located in the northwest of the oblast and borders with the territory of Strezhevoy Town Under Oblast Jurisdiction, with Kargasoksky District, and with Khanty–Mansi Autonomous Okrug. The area of the district is 30,160 square kilometers (11,640 sq mi).} Its administrative center is the rural locality (a selo) of Alexandrovskoye. Population: 8,686 (2010 Census); 10,136 (2002 census); 11,356 (1989 Soviet census)—the second least populated in Tomsk Oblast (after Teguldetsky District). The population of Alexandrovskoye accounts for 83.0% of the district's total population.

== Geography ==
The Ob River splits the district in two parts and serves as the main means of transportation. The majority of the district's inhabited localities are located along the Ob. The Kievsky Yogan is one of the main tributaries of the Ob in the district.

== History ==
The district was established in 1923 as a part of Tobolsk Okrug of Ural Oblast.

== Economy ==
Twenty-two proven oil fields are located on the territory of the district, as well as natural gas and combustible peat deposits. There are no ground links to either Tomsk or the cities in Khanty–Mansi Autonomous Okrug; communication is possible via air or river transportation.

== Demographics ==
As of 2007, ethnic Russians formed the majority with 80%, followed by Germans at 9%, and Khant-Selkups at 4.8%.
