= Alexandrovsky District, Stavropol Krai =

Alexandrovsky District Александровский район (Russian)
- District
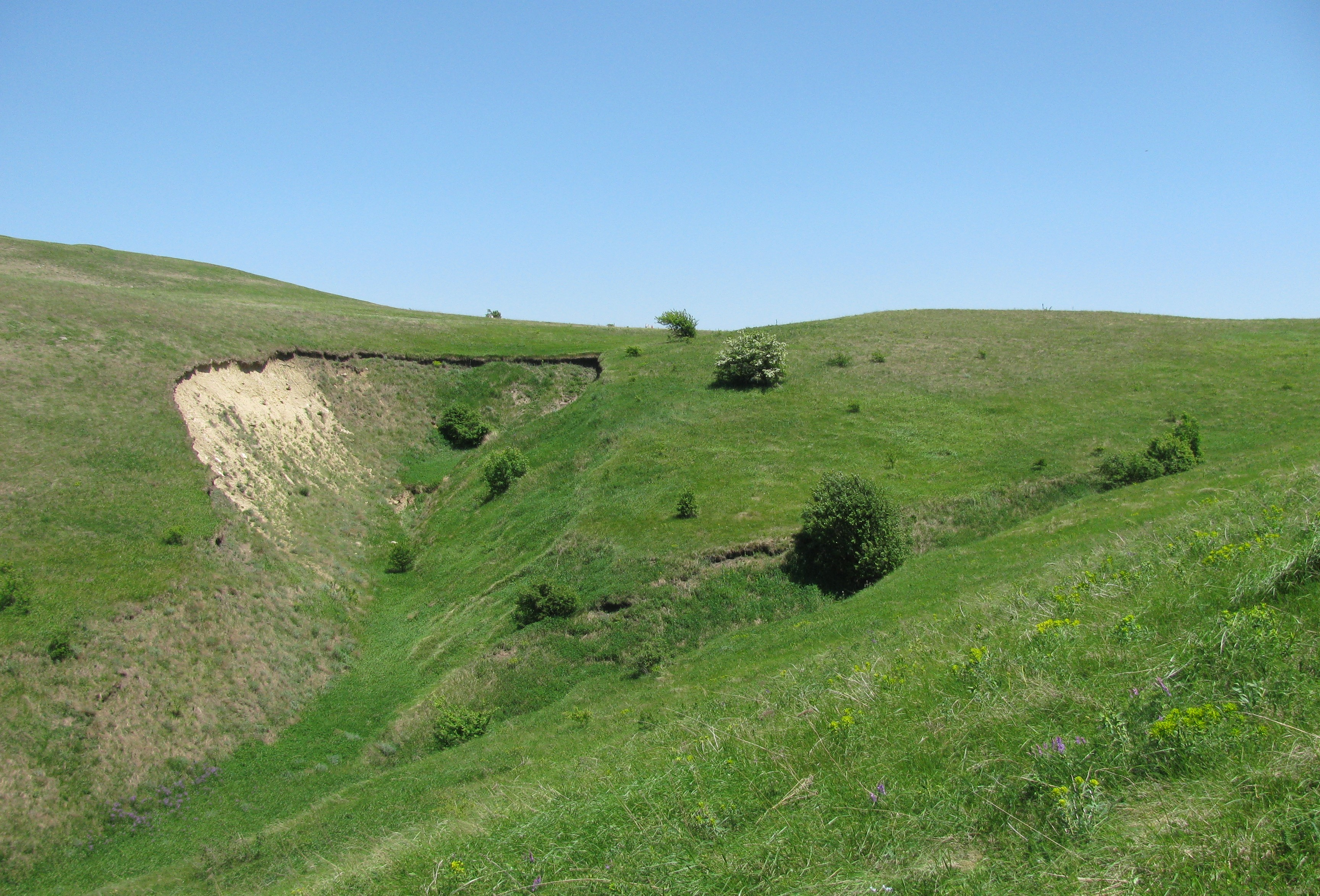
- Alexander Reserve, Alexandrovsky District

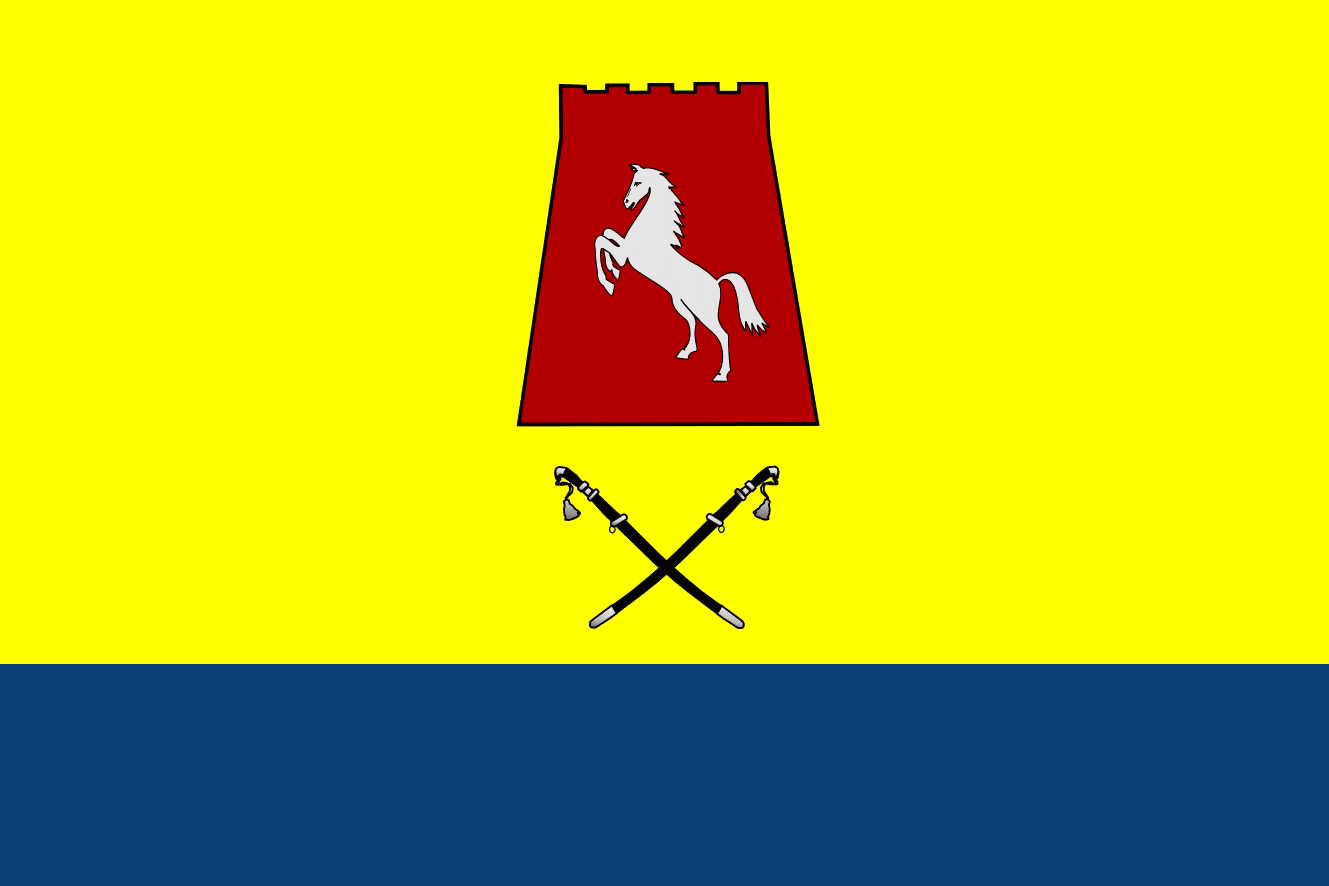
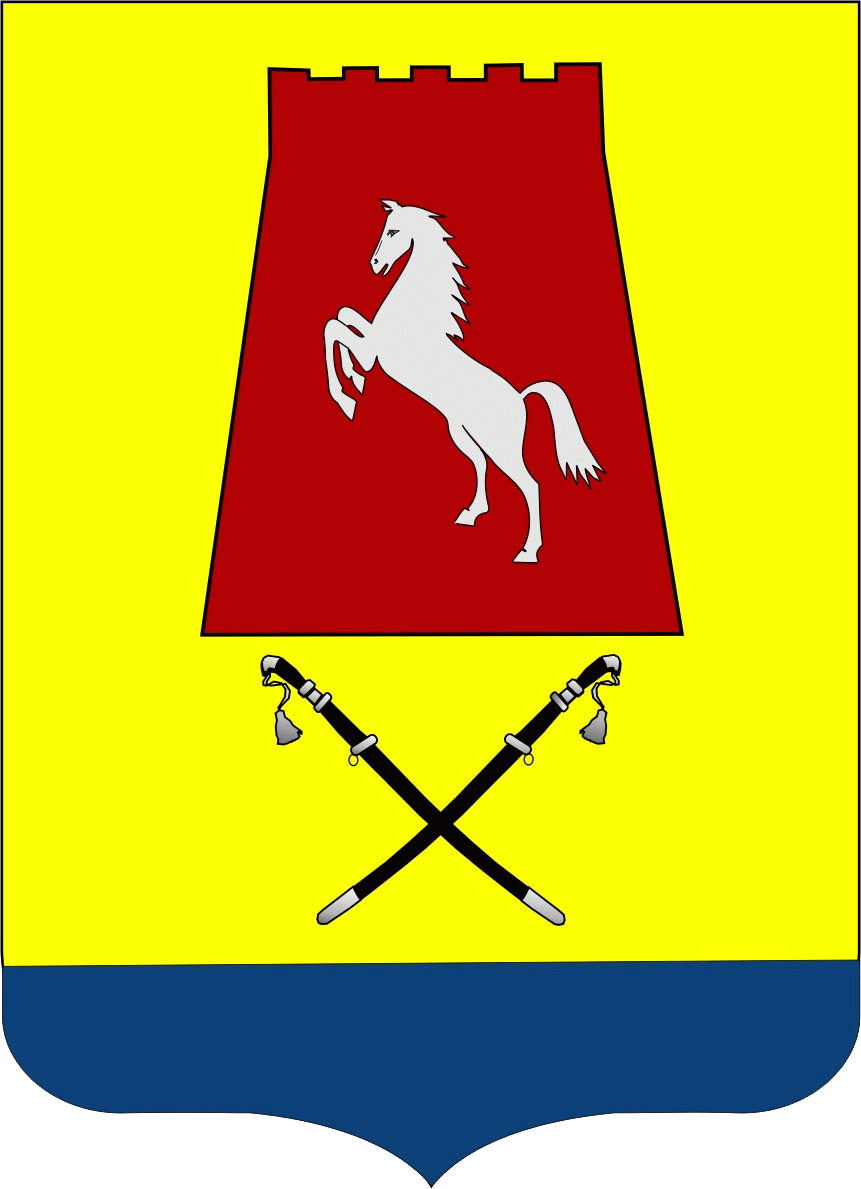
- Flag Coat of arms
- Location of Alexandrovsky District in Stavropol Krai
- Coordinates: 44°25′N 43°53′E
- Country: Russia
- Federal subject: Stavropol Krai
- Established: 1924
- Administrative center: Alexandrovskoye

Area
  - Total: 2,014 km^{2} (778 sq mi)

Population (2010 Census)
  - Total: 50,235
  - Density: 24.94/km^{2} (64.60/sq mi)
  - Urban: 0%
  - Rural: 100%

Administrative structure
  - Administrative divisions: 6 selsoviet
  - Inhabited localities: 21 rural localities

Municipal structure
  - Municipally incorporated as: Alexandrovsky Municipal District
  - Municipal divisions: 0 urban settlements, 8 rural settlements
- Time zone: UTC+3 (MSK)
- OKTMO ID: 07602000
- Website: http://aleksadmin.ru

Alexandrovsky District (Russian: Алекса́ндровский райо́н) is an administrative district (raion), one of the twenty-six in Stavropol Krai, Russia. Municipally, it is incorporated as Alexandrovsky Municipal District. It is located in the center of the krai. The area of the district is 2,014 square kilometers (778 sq mi). Its administrative center is the rural locality (a selo) of Alexandrovskoye. Population: 50,235 (2010 census); 50,978 (2002 Census); 49,434 (1989 Census). The population of Alexandrovskoye accounts for 54.7% of the district's total population.

== History ==
In 1924, Alexandrovsky Uyezd of Stavropol Governorate was transformed into a district of Stavropol Okrug within North Caucasus Krai. It underwent various administrative changes in the following years. In its current state, the district was established in 1972.

== Economy ==
The area has more than 450 enterprises of different ownership forms and specialties. The main occupation by far, however, is agriculture, which accounts for 80% of GDP. More than 15,000 families work on a private farm.
