= Alexandrovskoye, Stavropol Krai =

Alexandrovskoye Александровское
- Selo
- Interactive map of Alexandrovskoye
- Location of Alexandrovskoye Alexandrovskoye (Stavropol Krai)
- Coordinates: 44°43′N 43°00′E
- Country: Russia
- Federal subject: Stavropol Krai
- Administrative district: Alexandrovsky District
- Founded: 1777
- Elevation: 295 m (968 ft)

Population (2010 Census)
  - Total: 27,471
  - Estimate (2023): 25,313 (−7.9%)

Administrative status
  - Capital of: Alexandrovsky District
- Time zone: UTC+3 (MSK)
- Postal code: 356300–356304
- OKTMO ID: 07602402101

Alexandrovskoye (Russian: Алекса́ндровское) is a rural locality (a selo) and the administrative center of Alexandrovsky District of Stavropol Krai, Russia. Population: 27,471 (2010 census); 27,512 (2002 census); 26,509 (1989 Soviet census).
