= Vilhelm Garf =

Russian military commander (1885–1938)

Vilhelm Evgenievich Garf
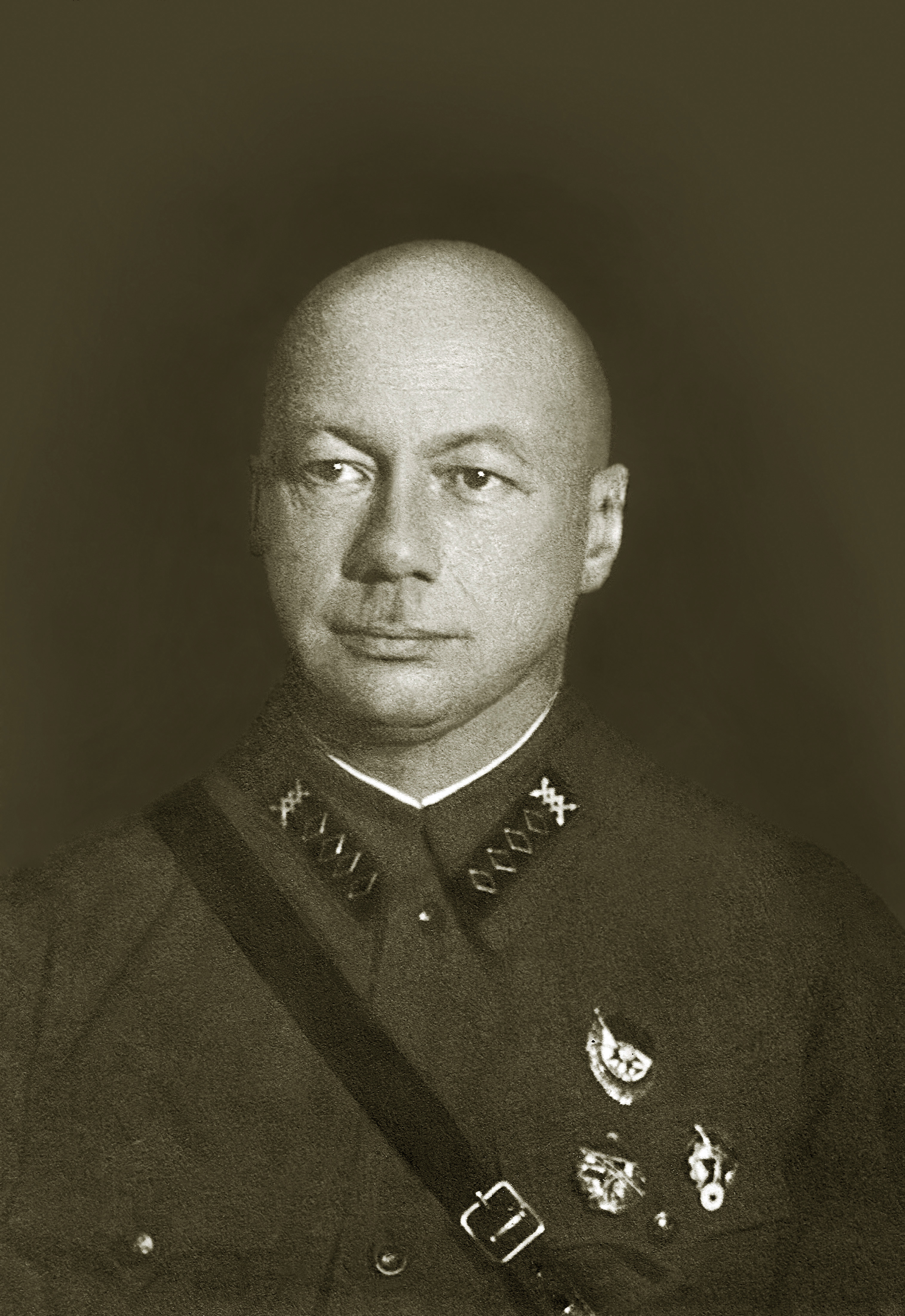
- Born: January 3, 1885 (December 1884 O.S.); Grodno, Russian Empire
- Died: August 22, 1938; Kommunarka, Soviet Union
- Military career
- Allegiance: Russian Empire; Soviet Union
- Branch: Imperial Russian Army; Soviet Red Army
- Service years: 1902–1917 (Russian Empire); 1918–1938 (Soviet Union)
- Rank: colonel (Russian Empire); Komdiv (Soviet Union)
- Units: 3rd Army Corps (Russian Empire); 1st Army (Russian Empire); 2nd Army Corps (Russian Empire); Eastern Front (RSFSR)
- Conflicts: World War I Russian Civil War

Vilhelm Evgenievich Garf (January 3, 1885 – August 22, 1938) was a Russian and Soviet military leader of German-Latvian descent, Colonel of the General Staff of the Russian Empire. He fought in the First World War, participated in the Civil War as part of the Red Army, an Officer of the General Staff of the RIA, later - the General Headquarters of the Red Army of the highest service category, division commander and head of the Telecommunications Academy. V.N. Podbelsky. Later he was a victim of political repression in the USSR.

He belonged to a German-Baltic noble family and was an evangelical Lutheran.

His name appeared, alongside komkor Vladimir Gittis, on the death list of 20 August 1938, which was signed by Joseph Stalin and Vyacheslav Molotov. He was convicted that day of espionage by the Military Collegium of the Supreme Court of the Soviet Union and sentenced to death. He was executed two days later at Kommunarka.

== Biography ==
Garf was born in Grodno (now the Republic of Belarus), the eldest son of Yevgeny Georgievich von Garf, an officer of the General Staff, later lieutenant general, head of the Main Directorate of Cossack troops, and Klara Fedorovna (1857— 1934), the daughter of Fedor Bogdanovich von Schulz, the vice admiral of the Russian fleet.

With the transfer of his father to the General Staff in 1889, Garf lived in St. Petersburg. He was educated in the Page Corps of His Imperial Majesty, where on September 1, 1902, he was accepted into service. On August 9, 1904, Garf was released from the corps as a second lieutenant in the Life Guards Jaeger Regiment. Two years later he was awarded the rank of lieutenant, and another year later, as he successfully passed the entrance exams, V.E. Garf was enrolled as a student of the Imperial Nikolaev Military Academy, from which he graduated from the first category with the appointment to the General Staff in 1910.

Among his classmates at the academy were students who later became major military leaders of the Red Army, including Nikolai Sollogub, V.L. Baranovsky, Boris Shaposhnikov, and A.I. Verkhovsky. At the same time, many future leaders of the White movement turned out to be graduates of the academy in 1910: Pyotr Wrangel, M. M. Zinkevich, N. V. Nagaev, V. I. Sidorin, A. L. Nosovich, and A. N. Vagin.

From November 1, 1910, for two years, Staff Captain Graf was serving the qualified command of the company in the Life Guards of the Jäger Regiment, as a result of which on November 26, 1912, he was seconded to the headquarters of the 3rd Army Corps (Russian Empire), stationed in Vilnius, where he assumed the office of senior adjutant.

== Participation in the First World War ==
With the outbreak of the First World War and the formation in July 1914 of the units of the Vilnius District of the 1st Army (Russian Empire), Captain Garf took over the position of senior adjutant of the Quartermaster General of Staff. As part of the Northwestern Front, the 1st Army (Russian Empire), under the command of General Paul von Rennenkampf, entered East Prussia on August 4, 1914. Already in the first weeks of the war, Garf distinguished himself in the Battle of Gumbinnen. On December 6, 1914, he was awarded the rank of lieutenant colonel, and in February of the following year he was appointed senior adjutant to the commander of the 26th Infantry Division, Major General P. A. Tikhonovich. The division was part of the 2nd Army Corps (Russian Empire), which since August 8 had been part of the 1st Army (Russian Empire). In February, the division advanced to Poland, where Garf distinguished himself in fierce battles in the area of the town of Sejny (February 25–28, 1915), the settlement of Krasnopol (March 15, 1915), and the city of Suwalki.

On September 10, 1915, Lieutenant Colonel Garf was appointed chief of staff of the 69th Infantry Division, which was part of the 21st Army Corps (3rd Army of the Southwestern Front). The division belonged to the second stage of mobilization and was formed only in 1914, that is, after the declaration of war. This meant that the percentage of untrained soldiers in it was much higher than in the divisions of the first stage, which were formed in peacetime.

Nevertheless, the division quickly earned a reputation as a reliable unit, having been on the South-Western Front since 1914, where it participated in battles for Lviv and in the siege of the Austrian fortress Przemysl. The following year, the division fought in the Carpathians, then in the summer it passed a difficult route of retreat from Galicia. Garf assumed the post of chief of staff of the division in those days when, in the beginning of autumn 1915, as part of 21 corps, it was transferred to the Western Front in the region of Krevo-Smorgon. The division remained here for more than two years, until the dissolution of the imperial army in March 1918 after the Bolsheviks signed the Treaty of Brest-Litovsk Peace. All this time the division waged bloody defensive battles for Smorgon.

The head of the division, Lieutenant General A.P. Gavrilov, wrote very favorably of Garf:

"He dealt with combat operations of the division in the field and staff activities skillfully and quickly, and ignored the dangers in pursuing success in battle. As a chief of staff, he is quite on point, with great tact and initiative. He treats his subordinates cordially and fairly and, although of a gentle nature, is persistent in his demands. He endures the combat environment very easily and is in very good health."

Signed by the head of the 69th Infantry Division, Lieutenant General Gavrilov. November 18, 1916. "

In July 1917, units of the 69th division participated in the well-known “Kerensky offensive”. Then Graf then received his final promotion in the old army to Colonel on August 15, 1917.

After the October Revolution, Colonel Garf, in his previous post of Chief of Staff of the 69th Division, remained on the front lines. While the army collapsed, the division was among the few that did not lose their combat effectiveness and discipline. On January 30, 1918, Commander-in-Chief N.V. Krylenko summoned Garf to Petrograd, where he appointed him assistant clerk of the Main Directorate of the General Staff. In March 1918, simultaneously with the signing of the Treaty of Brest-Litovsk, one of the conditions of which was the demobilization of the imperial army, the capital of the republic, and with it the General Directorate of the General Staff, were transferred to Moscow. Petrograd. Garf left Petrograd.

Almost two months later, on May 8, 1918, the General Headquarters was created to replace the Main Directorate of the General Staff. In it, as a volunteer, Garf took the post of head of the Austrian branch at the Military Statistics Division of the Operations Directorate.

== In the service of the Workers and Peasants Red Army ==
Having believed the calls of the former General Mikhail Dmitriyevich Bonch-Bruyevich, Garf voluntarily joined the Red Army and, on October 8, 1918, was appointed to the headquarters of the Eastern Front. While the front was commanded by Sergey Kamenev, Garf was the head of the operational intelligence department of the front headquarters and field control. With the arrival of the new commander Alexander Samoylo on July 7, 1919, and before the front was disbanded on January 15, 1920, Garf was the permanent chief of staff of the Eastern Front. After Samoylo, the front was sequentially commanded by Sergei Kamenev (repeatedly), Pavel Pavlovich Lebedev, Mikhail Frunze, and Vladimir Olderogge.

Despite frequent changes in leadership on the Eastern Front, Garf maintained operational continuity and troop discipline. He remained chief of staff through the tenures of several superior officers, many of whom served only briefly.

After the successful Ufa operation (May 25 - June 20), Garf, as a recognized specialist in the "field of tactics of military operations using infantry", led the headquarters during the most active offensive operations of the Eastern Front. Under his leadership, the Zlatoust (June 24 - July 13) and Chelyabinsk (July 17 - August 4) operations were developed and successfully conducted.

On August 14, 1919, the southern group of armies of the Eastern Front was transformed into the Turkestan Front. The remaining front forces were tasked with defeating A.V. Kolchak and liberating Siberia. The headquarters developed and carried out the Petropavlovsk Operation with great skill from August to November 1919. During the offensive, Tobolsk (October 22), Petropavlovsk (October 31), and Omsk (November 14) were liberated. In December, Barnaul (December 11), Novonikolaevsk (December 14), and Tomsk (December 20) were taken. Finally, on January 7, 1920, Krasnoyarsk fell. The Peter and Paul offensive led to the complete defeat of the main forces of Kolchak's army. The Eastern Front had fully fulfilled its task, and by directive of the High Command of January 6, 1920, the Office of the Eastern Front was disbanded on January 15.

For the final destruction of the scattered remnants of the Kolchak army, the 5th Army was left under the command of Mikhail Matiyasevich. Before the latter took office on February 8, 1920, Garf commanded the army for some time, after which he was appointed chief of its headquarters.

By the summer of 1920, the last centers of white resistance were suppressed, and on June 23, 1920, Garf was recalled to Moscow. The main battles of the Civil War were completed. For successfully preparing and conducting operations on the Eastern Front of the Civil War, Garf was awarded the Order of the Red Banner in 1921.

Being a non-partisan representative of a social class alien to the Bolsheviks, and also an ethnic German, for many years Garf held various leadership positions in the headquarters of the Red Army solely because of his professionalism. Over the years, he was assistant to the chief of the operational management of the field headquarters of the RVSR (July 15, 1920 - January 14, 1921); head of the organizational department of the headquarters of the Red Army (January 14, 1921 — September 24, 1921); the second assistant to the chief of staff of the Red Army (September 24, 1921 - January 5, 1924) (in charge of accounting, organization and mobilization issues; the command staff, organizational and mobilization departments were subordinate to him).

In May 1924, when the accounting and organizational departments were separated into an independent Organization and Accounting Department, Garf was transferred to the post of its head. In October 1925, Garf became an assistant to the head of the Office of military schools of the Red Army, but after 2 months he was appointed deputy head of the Main Directorate of the Red Army. In January 1927 he became assistant to the head of the Directorate of Military Educational Institutions of the Red Army, but after 2 months he was appointed deputy head of the Main Directorate of the Red Army. In November 1929 he was transferred to the position of assistant chief of armaments of the Red Army.

In February 1931, Garf switched to teaching, first as a military instructor at the Moscow Electrotechnical Institute of Communications (MEIS), and since August 1932, as deputy head of the Telecommunications Engineering Academy named after V.N. Podbelsky at the People's Commissariat of Communications of the USSR. At the same time, Garf headed the command faculty of the academy, he was assigned the highest service category K-14.

In September 1934, he was appointed to his last post - the head of the Academy of Communications named after V.N. Podbelsky. With the introduction of military ranks in the Red Army in September 1935, and order of the USSR People's Commissar of Defense No. 2395 dated November 20, 1935, Garf was awarded the personal rank of division commander, which can be regarded as a certain reduction. The highest service category K-14 assumed the assignment of a rank not lower than the commander of the 2nd rank. By the arbitrariness of Kliment Voroshilov, such a decrease affected almost all the heads of military academies.

Garf led the academy in those years when the difficult process of merging the Moscow Electrotechnical Institute of Communications and the academy named after V.N. Podbelsky. It ended after his arrest.

== Victim of political repression in the USSR and rehabilitation ==
With the onset of the "Great Terror", in early 1938 Garf was removed from his post and sent to the disposal of the Office of the Red Army. The arrest followed on May 10, 1938. Garf's son Eugene, a fifth-year student of the engineering department of the Military Academy of Chemical Protection, a second-level military technician, was arrested and sentenced to a long prison term.

The investigation did not take much time. It is not possible to tell whether his interrogators were able to break the commander. He kept silent that his cousin L. L. Kerber, who had been arrested ten days earlier, was in one of the neighboring cells of the internal prison on Lubyanka, thereby saving his life. The NKVD investigators never found out about the close family ties of the two prisoners, who had been arrested almost simultaneously, although for different reasons.

By a resolution of the Military Collegium of the Supreme Court of the USSR of May 28, 1955, Garf was completely rehabilitated. Chairman of the Presidium of the Supreme Soviet of the USSR Voroshilov apologized to his wife, Serafima Vasilievna, for the "unfortunate mistake". He was shot by the regular NKVD executioner V. Blokhin and his henchmen on the same night, August 22, 1938, at the NKVD facility "Kommunarka".

== Family ==
Before his arrest, V.E. Garf and his family lived in the model house 9/11 in Potapovsky Lane, where many famous Soviet leaders, including senior commanders, settled.

- wife: Serafima Vasilievna ur. Shlyapnikov (1885–1957);
- son: Eugene Wilhelmovich Garf (1913–1977);
- daughter: Tatyana Vilgelmovna Luzanova (1921–1990) - wife of the People's Artist of the RSFSR Fedor Petrovich Luzanov;
- brother: Evgeny Evgenievich (1895–1916) - staff captain, participant in the First World War. He died on September 3, 1916, was buried in the crypt of the Mironievskaya Church of the Life Guards of the Jäger Regiment;
- uncle: vice admiral Ludwig Bernhardovich von Kerber;
- cousin: Victor L. Corvin-Kerber (1894–1970) - staff captain, life huntsman, participant in the First World War. Later - a marine pilot, aircraft designer;
- cousin: Leonid Lvovich Kerber (1903–1993) - Doctor of Technical Sciences, aircraft designer, deputy general designer of design bureaus A. N. Tupolev for equipment;
- cousin: Boris Lvovich Kerber (1907–1978) - aircraft designer, deputy general designer of design bureaus A. Mikoyan for equipment;
- uncle: Vice Admiral Maximilian Fedorovich von Schulz;
- uncle: 2nd-rank captain Konstantin Fedorovich von Schulz.

== Awards ==
- Order of St. Anne 4th degree
- Order of St. Stanislav 3rd degree with swords and bow;
- Order of St. Anne of the 3rd degree with swords and bow;
- Order of St. Stanislav 2nd degree with swords;
- Order of St. Anne of the 2nd degree with swords;
- Order of St. Vladimir 4th degree with swords and bow;
- Order of the Red Banner.

== Bibliography ==
- Garf, Wilhelm Evgenievich. // Project "Russian Army in the Great War" .;
- Garf Wilhelm Evgenievich; Biography on the site "Russian Imperial Army";
- Kopytov G.A. Kerbery. Surname code. XIV — XXI centuries second book // ed. "Petersburg - XXI century." 2013;
- Volkov S.V. Officers of the Russian Guard. - M .: 2002;
- Cherushev N.S., Cherushev Yu.N. The executed elite of the Red Army (commanders of the 1st and 2nd ranks, comkors, divisional commanders and their peers): 1937–1941. Biographical Dictionary. - M .: Kuchkovo field; Megapolis, 2012 .-- S. 203–204. - 496 p. - 2000 copies. - ISBN 978-5-9950-0217-8 ..

Preceded by Alexander Kolenkovsky	Chief of Staff of the Eastern Front (RSFSR); April 3- May 2, 1919	Succeeded by Pavel Pavlovich Lebedev
Preceded by Pavel Pavlovich Lebedev	Chief of Staff of the Eastern Front (RSFSR); July 9, 1919 - Jan 15, 1920	Succeeded by front disbanded
