= Vasily Pavlovich Glagolev =

Soviet military commander

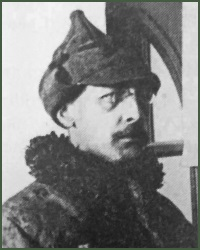
- Born: 23 May 1883; Saint Petersburg, Russian Empire
- Died: 14 March 1938 (aged 54) Moscow, Soviet Union
- Allegiance: Russian Empire; Russian Soviet Federative Socialist Republic; Far Eastern Republic; Soviet Union
- Service years: 1900–1917 (Russian Empire); 1918–1920 (RSFSR); 1920 (Far Eastern Republic); 1920–1938 (Soviet Union)
- Rank: Kombrig
- Commands: 38th Infantry Regiment (Russian Empire); 9th Rifle Division; 11th Cavalry Division; 12th Cavalry Division; 16th Army; 10th Army; 6th Army

Vasily Pavlovich Glagolev (Russian: Васи́лий Па́влович Глаго́лев; 23 May 1883 – 14 March 1938) was an Imperial Russian and Soviet military commander. He was made Kombrig 13 December 1935, with the reintroduction of military ranks.

== Early life ==
Born into a noble family of Russian ethnicity in St. Petersburg, Glagolev graduated from the 1st Cadet Corps in 1900. He entered the Konstantinovskoye Artillery School on September 1 of that year, graduating in 1903 with the rank of Podporuchik. He served in the 1st Turkestan Artillery Brigade. In 1909, he graduated from the Nikolayev Military Academy with First Class honors. From October 28, 1909, to November 2, 1911, he completed his qualifying company command tour in the 10th Turkestan Rifle Regiment; from May 7, 1912, he served as Senior Adjutant on the staff of the 1st Turkestan Cossack Division.

== World War I ==
At the outbreak of the World War I, he held the same position; subsequently, he served as Senior Adjutant on the staff of the Turkestan Cavalry Brigade, Assistant Senior Adjutant in the Quartermaster-General's Department on the staff of the 5th Army (and later the 12th Army), and Assistant Chief of a Section within the Quartermaster-General's Directorate on the staff of the Northern Front. From December 3, 1915, he served as Senior Adjutant in the Quartermaster-General's Department on the staff of the 12th Army; subsequently, he served as Acting Chief of Staff of the 1st Infantry Division. From December 2, 1916, he served as Acting Chief of Staff of the 128th Infantry Division, and later as Acting Chief of Staff of the 186th Infantry Division. On October 2, 1917, he was appointed Commander of the 38th Turkestan Rifle Regiment, commanding the regiment until its dissolution. He was demobilized in October 1917.

== Russian Civil War ==
After the October Revolution, Glagolev went over to the Bolsheviks. In April 1918, he voluntarily joined the Red Army and was appointed Military Chief of the Kursk District (April–May 1918). From May 13, 1918, he served as the Kursk Gubernia Military Commissar; and from May 3 to October 1918, he commanded the 1st Kursk Infantry Division (renamed the 1st Kursk Soviet Infantry Division on August 13, 1918, and the 9th Rifle Division on October 3, 1918).

On October 23, 1918, he was appointed Acting Commander of the newly forming Reserve Army, with its headquarters located in Oryol. The plan was to incorporate the 9th, 12th, and 22nd Rifle Divisions into the army; however, the formation of the army was never completed.

On January 4, 1919, the Ukrainian Front was established based on the army's administrative headquarters, and the units that had already been assembled were transferred to its command. At that same time, V. P. Glagolev was appointed Chief of Staff of this Front, a position he held until May 2, 1919. In this capacity, he participated in the Front's offensive operations during January and February 1919—including the liberation of Kharkiv, Kyiv, and all of Left-Bank Ukraine—and in the battles fought during March and April against forces of the Ukrainian People's Republic (UNR) and foreign interventionists, leading to the liberation of Right-Bank and Southern Ukraine, as well as Crimea.

From May 6 to May 29, 1919, he commanded the 6th Army on the Northern Front, participating in battles for control of the Vologda–Arkhangelsk railway.

From July 22 to August 14, 1919, he served as Commander of the 16th Army on the Western Front, participating in the Polish–Soviet War. During this period, the 16th Army engaged in heavy defensive battles and retreated along the Panevėžys–Molodechno and Minsk axes.

From September 24, 1919, to October 16, 1919, he served as commander of the 11th Cavalry Division and participated in battles against the forces of General A. I. Denikin.

From December 5, 1919, to September 8, 1920, he served as commander of the 12th Cavalry Division. He participated in battles against White Guard forces in the Kuban region: in January–February 1920, during the offensive into the Kuban; in April–July 1920, during the elimination of the remnants of White Guard forces in the vicinity of Batalpashinsk, Pyatigorsk, and Vladikavkaz; and in August–September, during battles against General M. A. Fostikov’s Army for the Revival of Russia and the liquidation of the Ulagay landing force.

On June 20, 1920, he was appointed commander of the 10th Army (while simultaneously retaining command of the 12th Cavalry Division, which was part of the army at the time) and participated in the elimination of bandit groups in the Terek Region. He commanded the army until its disbandment on July 8, 1920.

From 1921, he served in the People's Revolutionary Army (NRA) of the Far Eastern Republic (FER); from August 1, 1921, he served as assistant commander of the 1st Transbaikal Brigade of the NRA; from January 15, 1922, as chief of the NRA Intelligence Directorate; and from February 5, 1922, as chief of the 1st Department of the NRA Intelligence Directorate. From March 30, 1922, he served as the First Assistant Chief of Staff of the Eastern Front of the Far Eastern Republic (FER), participating in battles against the White Rebel Army led by General V. M. Molchanov. On May 2, 1922, the Front Headquarters was disbanded, and its troops were consolidated into a Composite Rifle Division. On July 18, 1922, he was appointed Acting Chief of Staff of the Composite Rifle Division (renamed the 2nd Amur Rifle Division on July 27). From October 4 to October 25, 1922, he participated in the Primorye Operation. The division distinguished itself during the storming of Spassk and in the fighting in the Monastyrische–Lyalichi area; on November 22, 1922, the division was awarded the Order of the Red Banner.

By November 1922, Soviet power had been established in Primorye, and the Far Eastern Republic was incorporated into the RSFSR; on November 16, 1922, the People's Revolutionary Army (NRA) was renamed the 5th Army.

== Soviet period ==
From November 30, 1922, Glagolev served as Assistant Commander of the 5th Army; from November 1922 to July 1924, he was Chief of Staff of the 5th Army. In June 1924, the 5th Army was disbanded. From July to September 1924, he served as Chief of Staff of the 18th Rifle Corps. Subsequently, V. P. Glagolev was successively placed at the disposal of the Revolutionary Military Council (RVS) of the Siberian Military District (September 1924 – July 1925) and the RVS of the North Caucasus Military District (July 1925 – November 1926). He participated in the "campaign for the disarmament and elimination of bandit elements" in Chechnya (August–September 1925) and in Dagestan (August–September 1926).

He served as an officer for special assignments attached to the RVS of the North Caucasus Military District (November 1926 – February 1930), the Directorate of the Chief of Armaments of the Red Army (February–September 1930), the Deputy People's Commissar of Defense of the USSR, and the Chairman of the RVS of the USSR. He worked within the central apparatus of the Red Army and was subsequently placed at the disposal of the Intelligence Directorate of the Red Army (January 1935 – July 1937). He was fluent in French, English, German, and Polish. In 1937, he was discharged from the Red Army "due to illness" and retired on a pension. During the Great Purge, Glagolev was arrested on December 11, 1937. On March 14, 1938, the Military Collegium of the Supreme Court of the USSR sentenced him to death on charges of espionage and participation in a "military-fascist conspiracy." He was executed by firing squad that same day at Kommunarka and buried at the same site.

After the death of Joseph Stalin, Glagolev was rehabilitated (posthumously exonerated) on April 30, 1957.

== Dates of rank ==
- Podporuchik 1903
- Poruchik (13 August 1905)
- Stabskapitan (30 April 1909)
- Kapitan 1911/1912
- Podpolkovnik
- Polkovnik (1916)

Military offices
Preceded by Alexander Novikov	Commander of the 16th Army; 22 July – 14 August 1919	Succeeded by Nikolai Sollogub
