= Eastern Front (RSFSR) =

Russian Civil War front

The Eastern Front (Russian: Восточный фронт РККА) was a front of the Red Army during the Russian Civil War, formed on June 13, 1918 and disbanded on January 15, 1920.

== Operations ==
The armies of the Eastern Front fought in the Middle Volga region, Prikamye and Urals against the Czechoslovak Legion, the People's Army of Komuch, the Siberian Army and the armies of the Russian Eastern Front of Admiral Kolchak. In 1919, it occupied the foothills of the Urals, and then the whole of Siberia.

After mastering Siberia, the Eastern Front was disbanded, except in the homelands of former White Cossack troops (Akmola, Aktobe, Orenburg, Troitsky, Ural), the Eastern Front was preserved until the beginning of 1921.

== Composition ==
- 1st Army
- 2nd Army
- 3rd Army (July 1918 - Januari 1920)
- 4th Army
- 5th Army (August 1918 - Januari 1920)
- Turkestan Army (March - June 1919)
- Reserve Army

== Commanders ==
Commander :

- Mikhail Muravyov (June 13 - July 10, 1918, rebelled),
- Jukums Vācietis (July 11 – 28, 1918),
- Sergey Kamenev (28 Sep. 1918 - May 5, 1919),
- Alexander Samoylo (May 5 – 29, 1919),
- Sergey Kamenev (May 29 - July 7, 1919),
- Pavel Pavlovich Lebedev (acting, 8 – 19 July 1919),
- Mikhail Frunze (19 July - 15 Aug. 1919),
- Vladimir Olderogge (15 Aug. 1919 – 15 Jan. 1920).

Chief of Staff :

- Nikolai Sollogub (June 26-July 10, 1918),
- V. F. Tarasov (acting, July 10 – 23, 1918),
- Parfany Maygur (July 23 – September 27, 1918),
- Alexander Kolenkovsky (28 Sep. 1918 – 3 Apr. 1919),
- Vilhelm Garf (acting, 3 Apr. – 2 May 1919),
- Pavel Pavlovich Lebedev (May 2 – July 8, 1919),
- Vilhelm Garf (9 July 1919 – 15 Jan. 1920).

Members of the Revolutionary Military Council include:

- Pyotr Kobozev
- Ivan Smirnov
- Arkady Rosengolts
- Ivar Smilga
- Sergey Ivanovich Gusev
- Mikhail Lashevich
- Konstantin Yurenev
- Shalva Eliava
- Boris Pozern
- Nikolay Muralov
- Pavel Shternberg
