= 52nd Infantry Regiment (Russian Empire) =

Infantry regiment of the Imperial Russian Army

52nd Vilna Infantry Regiment His Imperial Highness Grand Duke Kirill Vladimirovich Regiment
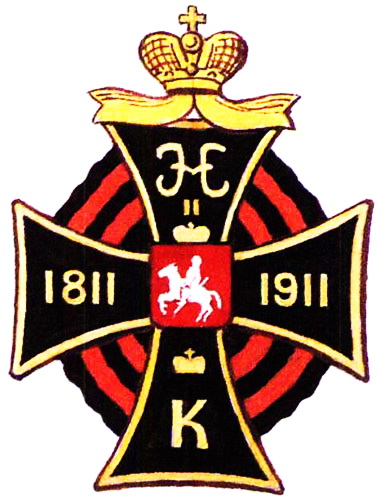
- Active: 1811–1918
- Country: Russian Empire; Russian Republic (from 1917)
- Branch: Imperial Russian Army; Russian Army (from 1917)
- Type: Infantry
- Part of: 13th Infantry Division
- Garrison/HQ: Feodosia
- Engagements: Patriotic War of 1812; War of the Sixth Coalition; Caucasian War; Crimean War; Russo-Turkish War; World War I; Battle of Yanchinsky; Brusilov Offensive

The 52nd Vilnius Infantry Regiment of His Imperial Highness Grand Duke Kirill Vladimirovich was an infantry military unit of the Imperial Russian Army. It was part of the 13th Infantry Division.

== Formation and campaigns ==
The infantry regiment was formed on 29 October 1811 from the companies of the Uglich infantry and Moscow, Arkhangelsk and Kazan garrison regiments.

For participation in the Patriotic War of 1812 and War of the Sixth Coalition, the regiment was awarded the "campaign for military distinction". On 14 February 1831, one battalion of the Vilnius Regiment was separated to form the Prague Infantry Regiment, which was replaced by a battalion of the Yaroslavl Regiment.

On 28 January 1833, the 1st and 3rd battalions of the 48th Jaeger Regiment were added to the infantry formation, and the Vilnius Regiment was renamed into a Jaeger Regiment. On 22 February 1845, the regiment was assigned a battalion of the Jaeger Grand Duke Mikhail Pavlovich Regiment, and on 16 December of the same year, the 2nd and 3rd battalions were detached from the regiment to form the Kuban Jaeger Regiment.

On 14 November 1853, the regiment defeated the Ottomans at Akhaltsikhe, for which it was awarded the St. George Banner with the corresponding inscription. For its participation in the Crimean War, the regiment was awarded badges on its headdresses with the inscription - for the 1st and 2nd battalions: "For distinction in 1854 and 1855", for the 3rd and 4th battalions: "For distinction in 1853, 1854 and 1855."

On 17 April 1856, the regiment was redesignated an infantry regiment. On 25 March 1865, the troop number 52 was added to the regiment's name, and from 30 September 1876 to 5 October 1905, the regiment's chief was Grand Duke Kirill Vladimirovich, who was again appointed chief of the Vilnius Regiment on April 14, 1909.

From 4 December 1873, the regiment was stationed in Feodosia, in the rifle barracks on Voennaya (now Viti Korobkova) Street. The transfer was carried out gradually, initially the camp assembly was near Kerch, and the general divisional assembly near Sevastopol. Only the headquarters and two battalions were stationed in Feodosia. Later, after the entire regiment was transferred to Feodosia, it was allocated two barracks complexes for accommodation - the so-called "gray" barracks (Fedko Street, house No. 38) and the "Vilno" barracks (Viti Korobkova Boulevard, house No. 14), as well as the buildings of the bankrupt mechanical establishment of engineer Maslyannikov, converted to accommodate the regimental supply train. From 7 to 11 companies of the regiment were housed in the "gray" barracks at different times.

During the Russo-Turkish War, the regiment guarded the Crimean coast from Feodosia to Sudak. During peacetime, the regiment played a major role in the public life of Feodosia, organized parades on holidays, the regiment's orchestra played on the city boulevard during public festivities (on Sundays, Tchaikovsky's ceremonial overture "The Year 1812" was always performed, accompanied by the ringing of bells and pistol shots), the regiment's officers were eligible bachelors in the city.

On 23 June 1905, the 2nd company of the regiment fired on the Potemkin, which was loading coal in the Feodosia port, after which the ship weighed anchor and sailed to the shores of Romania.

During the Russian Revolution of 1905, individual companies of the regiment were repeatedly called upon to disperse strikes and demonstrations in the Taurida Governorate.

In August 1914, as part of the 13th Infantry Division, the regiment left for the front of World War I. The regiment participated in the Battle of Yanchinsky and Brusilov Offensive.

== Russian Revolution and Civil War ==
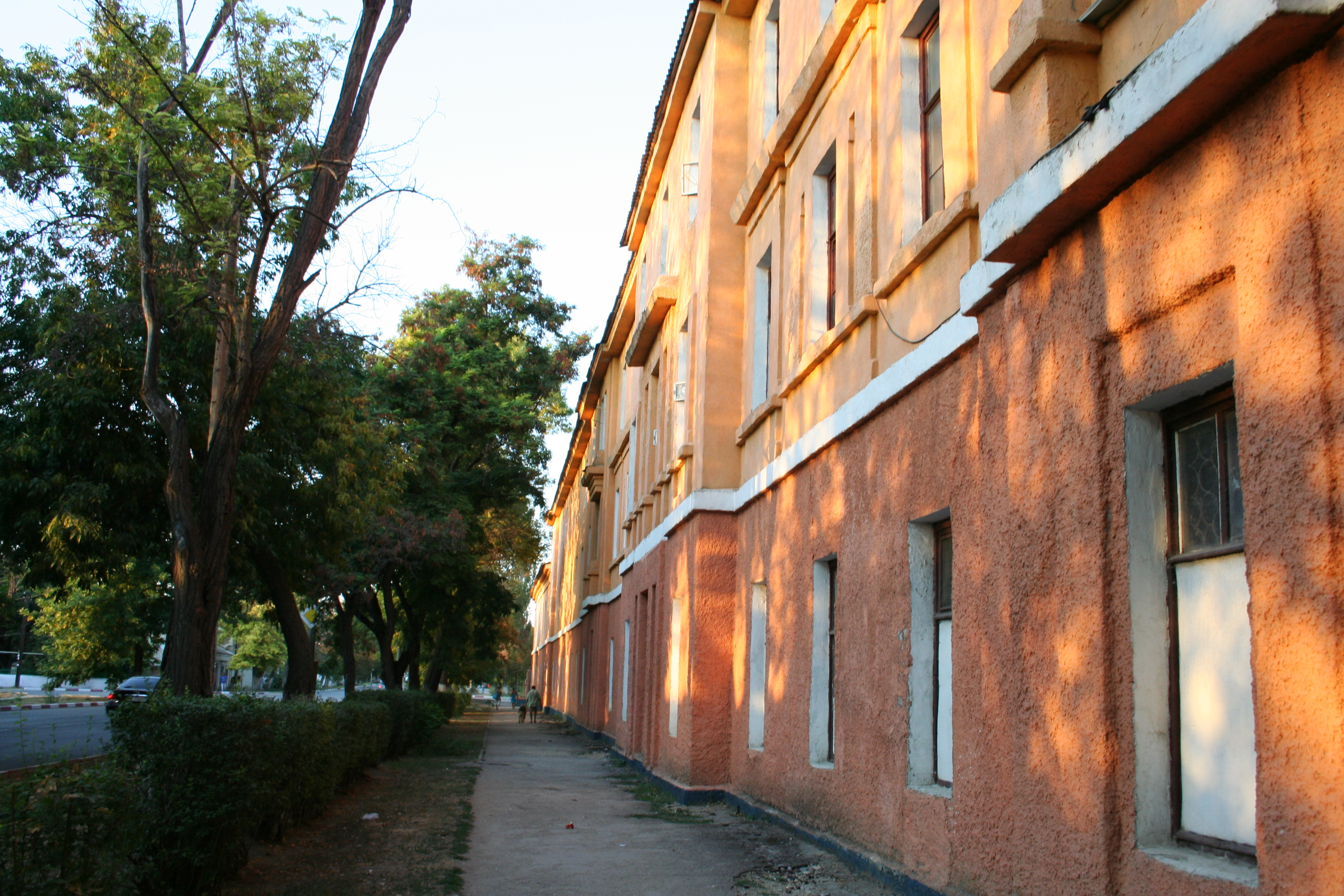
"Grey" barracks of the Vilnius regiment. Feodosia, Fedko street 38, to date a military unit

The regiment began to disintegrate after the publication of Order No. 1 and agitation by socialist parties. In the spring of 1917, the regiment's royal titles were stripped and the regiment's reserves refused to obey orders to the front. Later, the soldiers were finally persuaded to obey the order.

The regiment was disbanded after the October Revolution. Many of the regiment's servicemen returned to Feodosia. Some of them formed the Union of St. George Cavaliers and participated in the April uprising, which was suppressed by the Bolsheviks.

The regiment was revived in December 1918 in the Armed Forces of South Russia and the Army of Wrangel. It was part of the 13th Division of the 2nd Army Corps. Initially, in October 1918, the Vilnius residents were part of the Combined Crimean Infantry Regiment, then they formed a company in the combined battalion of the 13th Infantry Division. In February, they were already fighting at Perekop, in March, with the partisans in the Feodosia district, then, at the Ak-Monay positions.

On 18 June [O.S. 5 June], the Vilnius Regiment landed on the Kagul near Koktebel, attacking Red Army units from the rear, and thus contributing to their defeat and occupation of Feodosia. By 1 August, the Vilnius regiment already comprised a battalion of three companies with 80 bayonets each, and fought against the Bolsheviks, the Ukrainian People's Army, and Revolutionary Insurgent Army of Ukraine. The regiment was restored on 23 November 1919, consisting of six companies.

On 12 May [O.S. 29 April], the remnants of the Alekseev partisan regiments, the Combined Grenadier Division, and the Simferopol officer regiment (50 officers) were incorporated into the regiment as the 2nd Battalion. The Alekseevites again became an independent unit, and the regiment, as part of the 13th Division, participated in the Northern Taurida Operation and the Siege of Perekop.

During the Evacuation of the Crimea, the rear units of the regiment located in Feodosia did not depart and were captured by units of the 9th Rifle Division of the Red Army under the command of Nikolay Kuibyshev. On the very first night, from 16 November to 17 November 1920, by order of the commissar of the 9th Division M. Lisovsky, all wounded officers and soldiers of the regiment's convalescent team, about a hundred people in total, were shot at the Feodosia railway station. Perhaps this was revenge on the captured enemy, since the 9th Red Division repeatedly met with the Vilnius Regiment on the fields of Northern Taurida.

== Regiment Chiefs ==
- 27.04.1812 – xx.08.1812 — Colonel Alexander Yakovlevich Guberti
- 30 September 1876 – 5 October 1905 - Grand Duke Kirill Vladimirovich
- 14 April 1909 – 4 March 1917 - Grand Duke Kirill Vladimirovich

== Regiment commanders ==
(In pre-revolutionary terminology, a commander meant an acting chief or commander).

- 29.10.1811 – 10.11.1811 – Colonel Bykov, Alexander Nikolaevich
- 10.11.1811 – 27.04.1812 – Colonel Guberti, Alexander Yakovlevich
- 27.04.1812 – 01.06.1815 — Colonel Fyodor Konstantinovich Fomin
- 01.06.1815 – 05.03.1817 – Lieutenant Colonel Ivan Ermolaevich Burman
- 15.03.1817 – 28.02.1829 – lieutenant colonel (since 04.10.1820 colonel) Ustin Vasilievich Levandovsky
- 01.04.1829 – 21.05.1829 – Colonel Novitsky 2nd
- 12.05.1829 – 15.06.1832 – Colonel Andrei Varfolomeevich Aslanovich
- 15.06.1832 – 11.11.1835 – commander lieutenant colonel 2nd, Ivan Kuzovlev
- 11.11.1835 – 25.11.1836 – commanding colonel Egor Egorovich von Brink
- 14.12.1836 – 01.01.1845 – colonel (since 08.09.1843 major general) Vasily Vasilyevich Gubarev
- 04.01.1845 – 11.04.1855 – lieutenant colonel (since 22.07.1846 colonel, since 19.04.1853 major general) Arkady Bogdanovich von Leringhof Freytag
- 30.06.1855 – 17.09.1855 – Colonel Victor Maksimovich Shlikevich
- xx.xx.1855 – 30.08.1863 – colonel Zakhariy Nikiforovich Altukhov
- 21.09.1863 – 15.04.1866 – Colonel Georgy Dmitrievich Skordulli
- 25.04.1866 – xx.xx.1866 – Colonel Alexander Petrovich von Klosterman
- 1866 – 22.03.1875 – Colonel Dmitry Aleksandrovich Spichakov
- 22.03.1875 – 23.06.1878 – Colonel Sakerdon Alekseevich Gordanov
- 23.06.1878 – 20.12.1881 – Colonel Nikolai Dmitrievich Ivanov
- 20.12.1881 – 02.05.1882 – Colonel Nikolai Lvovich Boltin
- 02.05.1882 – 13.05.1886 – Colonel Georgy Aleksandrovich Kushakevich
- 25.05.1886 – 22.01.1892 – Colonel Andrei Konstantinovich Huck,
- 22.01.1892 – 14.01.1898 – colonel (since 14.05.1896 major general) Alexander Yakovlevich Ivanitsky
- 05.02.1898 – 12.10.1902 – Colonel Golembatovsky, Mikhail Grigorievich
- 03.11.1902 – 23.06.1906 – Colonel Alexander Antonovich Gertsyk
- 24.07.1906 – 04.12.1912 – colonel (since 29.10.1911 major general) Evgeny Yakovlevich Kotyuzhinsky
- 04.12.1912 – 19.08.1915 – colonel (since 16.05.1915 major general) Alexander Alexandrovich Shvetsov
- 19.08.1915 – 28.09.1916 – Colonel Pyotr Gavrilovich Vasiliev-Chechel
- 28.09.1916 – 10.06.1917 – Colonel Konstantin Konstantinovich Dorofeev
- 19.08.1917 – xx.xx.xxxx – Colonel Mikhail Matveevich Korolev

== Other formations of this name ==
- Vilnius Musketeer Regiment – formed on 29 August 1805. In 1810, the reserve battalion of the musketeer regiment took part in leveling the terrain for the Dvina Fortress. On 19 October 1810, it was named the 34th Jaeger. The regiment was disbanded in 1833, one battalion was attached to the Tomsk Infantry Regiment and two other battalions to the Kolyvan Infantry Regiment.
- Vilnius Provincial Battalion – formed on 17 January 1811; on 18 December it was named the Vilnius Local Regiment, from which the 3rd battalion was separated on 19 January 1878, and subsequently went on to form the 170th Molodechno Infantry Regiment. From the remaining part of the regiment, the 17th Reserve Infantry Battalion (later the 169th Novo-Troki Infantry Regiment) was formed on 31 August 1878.

== Notable members ==
- Alexander Nikolaevich Azaryev, (1871–1965).
- Alexander Khristoforovich Brevern, – colonel, hero of the Crimean War.
- Ivan Eikhenbaum, (1895–1982)
- Joseph Petrovich Zhabokritsky, – Russian general, participant in the Crimean War.
- Alexander Konstantinovich Kolenkovsky (1880–1942) – Soviet military historian, lieutenant general (1940).
- Nikolai Stepanovich Matveyev (1897–1979) - Soviet military leader, lieutenant general.
