= Battle of Dęblin and Mińsk Mazowiecki =

- Part of the Polish–Soviet War
Date	16–18 August 1920
Location	Near Mińsk Mazowiecki, Poland
Result	Polish victory

Belligerents
Russian SFSR	Poland

Commanders and leaders
Mikhail Tukhachevsky; Nikolai Sollogub	Józef Piłsudski; Leonard Skierski; Stanisław Wrzaliński

Units involved
16th Army	Polish 4th Army; Colonel Wrzaliński group

Casualties and losses
1,400 killed	About 90 killed and wounded

The Battle of Dęblin and Mińsk Mazowiecki took place on 16–18 August 1920, during the Polish–Soviet War. It resulted in the victory of the Polish Army (see Battle of Warsaw (1920)), commanded by Józef Piłsudski, General Edward Śmigły-Rydz, General Leonard Skierski and Colonel Stanisław Wrzaliński. The Soviet forces were led by General Mikhail Tukhachevsky and General Nikolai Sollogub.

== The Battle ==
Most of the Polish units that participated in the battle created the so-called First Assault Group (I Grupa Uderzeniowa), commanded by Piłsudski himself. The group consisted of the Third Army (Śmigły-Rydz) and the Fourth Army (Skierski) and concentrated in the area of Dęblin. The Second Assault Group, under Wrzalinski, attacked from Warsaw and captured Mińsk Mazowiecki with the support of tanks.

On 12 August 1920, a few days before the Wieprz River counteroffensive, Piłsudski came to Puławy, to inspect the troops. On the next day he arrived at Dęblin and met with Generals Śmigły-Rydz and Skierski. During the meeting, Piłsudski presented to them his plan of the attack on the Soviet positions. Facing Soviet 16th Army and Mozyr Group, Piłsudski took command of the First Assault Group and located his headquarters at the intersection of the roads from Dęblin to Kock and from Warsaw to Lublin.

On 16 August, at 4 a.m., Piłsudski issued an order to attack. Polish objective was to reach the road connecting Warsaw with Brzesc nad Bugiem to cut the supply lines and evacuation routes of Soviet Western Front. The right wing of Polish advance was protected by the 3rd Infantry Division, which attacked along the line Włodawa–Brzesc. The First Assault Group managed to destroy the Mozyr Group of the Red Army and the southern wing of Soviet 16th Army.

Simultaneously, the Second Assault Group of Wrzalinski, concentrated near Wesola and attacked towards Mińsk Mazowiecki, supported by Armoured Group of Major Nowicki (five tank units, three armoured trains, 10 airplanes). Wrzalinski and his soldiers began their offensive at 9 a.m. Divided into two columns, the Poles advanced rapidly and crushed Soviet resistance with their tanks and artillery. The 10th Rifle Division of the Red Army, which defended Debe Wielkie, abandoned its positions, and at about 6 p.m., two Polish armoured trains entered the rail station at Mińsk Mazowiecki, which forced the Soviets to retreat.

The Battle of Dęblin and Mińsk Mazowiecki is commemorated on the Tomb of the Unknown Soldier, Warsaw, with the inscription "DEBLIN – MINSK MAZOWIECKI 16 – 18 VIII 1920".

== Sources ==
- J. Odziemkowski, Leksykon wojny polsko-rosyjskiej 1919–1920, wyd. RYTM Warszawa 2004.
- Lech Wyszczelski, Bitwa na przedpolach Warszawy, Dom Wydawniczy Bellona 2000.
- Bogdan Skaradziński, Sąd boży 1920 roku, wyd. Świat Książki Warszawa 1996.
