= Alexander Kolenkovsky =

Russian and Soviet military leader and historian

Alexander Konstantinovich Kolenkovsky
- Born: September 4, 1880; Kherson Governorate, Russian Empire
- Died: May 23, 1942 (aged 61); Tashkent, Uzbek Soviet Socialist Republic, Soviet Union
- Military career
- Allegiance: Russian Empire; Soviet Union
- Branch: Imperial Russian Army; Soviet Red Army
- Service years: 1897–1942
- Rank: lieutenant colonel (Russian Empire) lieutenant general (Soviet Union)
- Units: 64th Infantry Division (Russian Empire); 6th Army (Russian Empire); 3rd Army (Russian Empire); Eastern Front (RSFSR)
- Conflicts: Russo-Japanese War; World War I Russian Civil War

Alexander Konstantinovich Kolenkovsky (September 4, 1880 – May 23, 1942) was a Russian and Soviet military leader, Soviet military historian, lieutenant general (1940), professor (1938), doctor of military sciences (1941).

== Biography ==
Alexander Konstantinovich Kolenkovsky was born in 1880 in Nikolaev of the Kherson province, in the family of an officer. Received home education.

On September 30, 1897, he entered the Odessa Infantry Junker School, was released in 1900, a second lieutenant in the 52nd Infantry Regiment, then served in the 218th Borisoglebsky Infantry Regiment. Member of the Russo-Japanese War, commanded a company, was an adjutant of the regiment. In 1912 he graduated from the Nikolaev Military Academy in the 1st category, since 1913 he served the censored company command in the 14th rifle regiment.

=== World War I ===
During the First World War, Kolenkovsky was senior adjutant of the headquarters of the 64th Infantry Division (Russian Empire). In February 1915 he participated in the August operation. Since August 6, 1915 – a teacher at the Odessa Military School, since 1916 – etc. Senior adjutant of the Division of the Quartermaster General of the Headquarters of the 6th Army, from January 2, 1917 – Senior adjutant of the office of the chief quartermaster of the headquarters of the 42nd Army Corps, from February 1917 – Chief of staff of the 181st Infantry Division, from February 20, 1918 – Senior adjutant of the quartermaster general of the 3rd Army headquarters, then quartermaster general of the headquarters of the same army.

=== Russian Civil War ===
In April 1918, A.K. Kolenkovsky voluntarily joined the Red Army, was appointed chief of staff of the military leader of the Nevelsky district, from July 1918 – chief of staff, in August–September 1918 – deputy chairman. Head of the 5th Vitebsk Rifle Division, from September 28, 1918, to April 3, 1919 – chief of staff of the Eastern Front (RSFSR), from April 29, 1919 – military leader of the Volga Military District, from August 1920 – military attache in Lithuania, from March 3, 1921, years – at the disposal of the commander-in-chief, from March 9, 1921, to 1924 – head of the Operations Department of the headquarters of the Red Army.

Since 1924, teaching at the military academy. Frunze, head of the department of military history. The author of scientific works on military history and operational art. Since 1940 – member of the CPSU (b).

During the Great Patriotic War, in the same position, he studied the experience of fighting near Rostov, in 1942 he wrote an article “The Rostov Operation of the Red Army”, in which he made important conclusions on the organization of offensive military operations.

Kolenkovsky died in Tashkent in 1942.

== Ranks ==
=== Russian Empire ===
- second lieutenant – (seniority (Art.) 17 January 1901)
- lieutenant – (Art. 1 September 1904)
- staff captain – (v. 13 August 1909)
- captain – (st. 9 September 1910)
- lieutenant colonel – 1916 (st. 6 December 1915)

=== Soviet Union ===
- Kombrig – 12 May 1935
- Komdiv – 2 May 1939
- lieutenant general – 6 April 1940

== Awards ==
=== Russian Empire ===
- Order of St. Stanislav 3rd degree with swords and bow (1907)
- Order of St. Anne of the 3rd degree (19 May 1912)
- Order of St. Vladimir of the 4th degree with swords and bow (VP 15.06.1915)

=== Soviet Union ===
- Order of the Red Star (5 February 1939)
- Medal "XX years of the Red Army" (22 February 1938)

== Works ==
- Dardanelles operation. – M. 1938 – 135 p.
- Winter operation in East Prussia in 1915. – M.-L., 1927. – 154 p.
- The maneuvering period of the first world imperialist war of 1914. – M. 1940.
- Marne operation. – M. 1933.
- About the offensive operation of the army, which is part of the front. – M. 1929.
- Rostov operation of the Red Army. – Collection "Proceedings of the Academy", 07.1942.
- The Russo-Turkish War of 1877–1878 – M. 1939 (shared with V. Belolipetskiy).

== Literature ==
- Kolenkovsky Alexander Konstantinovich // Big Soviet Encyclopedia: [in 30 vol.] / Ch. ed. A.M. Prokhorov. – 3rd ed. – M.: Soviet Encyclopedia, 1969–1978.
- Soviet military encyclopedia: In 8 volumes. T. 4. – M .: Military Publishing House, 1977.
- Soloviev D. Yu. All the generals of Stalin. – M., 2019 .-- ISBN 9785532106444. – S. 46–47.

Preceded by Parfany Maygur	Chief of Staff of the Eastern Front (RSFSR); September 28, 1918-April 3, 1919	Succeeded by Vilhelm Garf
