= Ivan Eikhenbaum =

Imperial Russian Army officer (1893–1982)

Ivan Andreevich Eikhenbaum
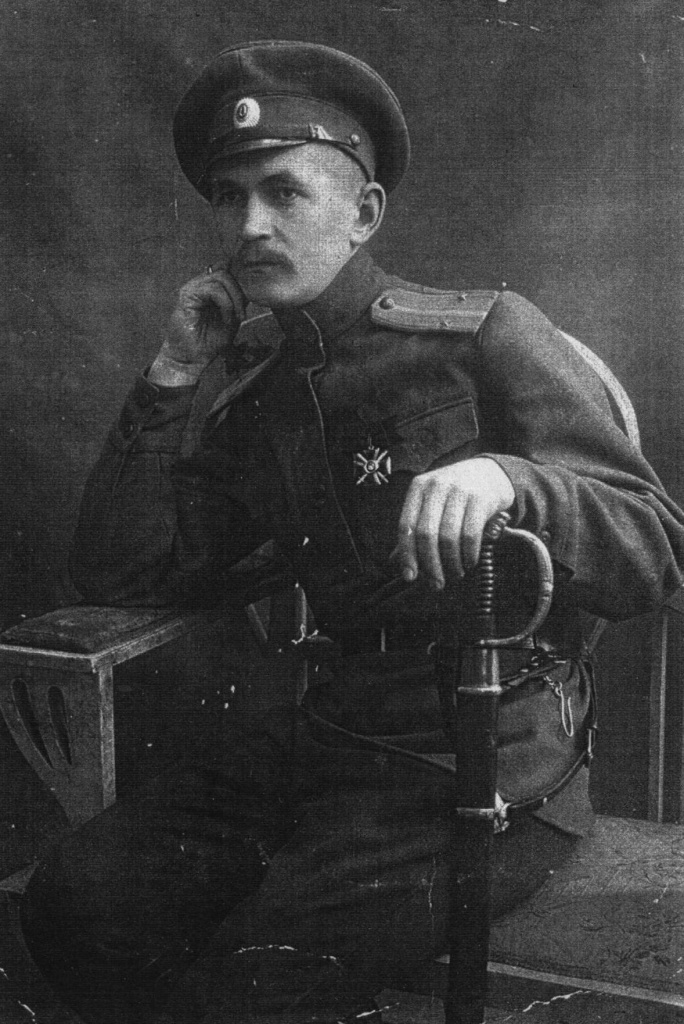
- Native name: Иван Андреевич Эйхенбаум
- Born: 13 February 1895; Riga, Livonia Governorate, Russian Empire
- Died: 12 November 1982 (aged 87) Buenos Aires, Argentina
- Allegiance: Russian Empire; Russian State; Latvia
- Branch: Imperial Russian Army; White Army; Latvia Armed Forces
- Service years: 1913–1940
- Rank: Praporshchik
- Commands: 52nd Vilna Infantry Regiment
- Conflicts: World War I; Brusilov offensive; Russian Civil War; First Kuban Campaign
- Spouse: Olga Fedorovna
- Children: 2

Ivan Andreevich Eikhenbaum (Russian: Иван Андреевич Эйхенбаум; 13 February 1895 – 12 November 1982) was an Imperial Russian Army officer who served in World War I and in the White movement during the Russian Civil War.

== Life ==
Eikhenbaum was born on 13 February 1895 in Riga, in the Livonia Governorate. He was the third and youngest child in the family. He lost his father at a young age and his mother was a former student and widowed, with three children and found herself in a difficult financial situation. He spent his school years and youth in Saint Petersburg. In 1913, he dropped out of school and volunteered to join the Russian Imperial Guard. He began his military career in the Life Guards in the Sapper Battalion and the Main Engineering Directorate. In August 1914, he entered the Irkutsk Military School. When World War I broke out, he volunteered for service in the army. He was a staff captain in the 52nd Vilna Infantry Regiment. He was knighted the St. George Ribbon during World War I. During the Russian Civil War, he joined the Armed Forces of South Russia in the 3rd Army Corps and participated in the First Kuban Campaign where he was promoted to colonel. Following the Russian Civil War, he left exile to Latvia where he served in the Latvian Army in 1922. After 1945, he moved to Argentina where he was head of the Russian All-Military Union in Argentina. He died on 12 November 1982 in Buenos Aires.

== Personal life ==
He was married to Olga Fedorovna, who was a university teacher. They had two twin daughters: Anna-Victoria and Ragneda, who were born on 26 December 1926.

== Awards ==
- Order of St. Vladimir, 4th Class with swords and bow, 1916

== Books ==
- Eikhenbaum Ivan, and Evgeny Messner (1966). The Great Lutsk-Chernivtsi Victory of 1916, Russkoe slovo.
- Eikhenbaum, Ivan (posthumous, 2015). Fighters: Notes of an Infantry Officer, 1915-1917, 1917-1918, 1940-1941, Tradiciâ, ISBN 9785990573307.
