= 6th Army (RSFSR) =

The 6th Army was a field army of the Red Army during the Russian Civil War, which was formed twice.

== First Formation ==
The 6th Army was formed on 11 September 1918 in the region of the Arkhangelsk, Kotlas and Vyatsky districts. The headquarters were located in Vologda (September 1918 - February 1920) and later Arkhangelsk (March - April 1920).

It was part of the Northern Front which fought against Entente troops and the White Northern Army which were based in Arkhangelsk and Murmansk.

In September–October 1918, the Sixth Army operated on the routes leading from Arkhangelsk to Vologda and the Northern Dvina to Kotlas and Vyatka, preventing the unification of anti-Soviet forces operating in the European North and those under command of Alexander Kolchak in Siberia. In January 1919, the Sixth Army fought the Battle of Shenkursk and in April–November 1919, tried to liberate the railway line Vologda-Arkhangelsk, the Pechora River, Northern Dvina River Pinega River and Mezen River.

After the withdrawal of the British and US Troops from Northern Russia in October 1919, the defeat of the White Northern Army and the conquest of Arkhangelsk and Murmansk in February and March 1920, the 6th Army was disbanded on 10 April 1920. The troops were transferred to the 7th Army.

== Commanders ==
=== Commanders ===
- Vladimir Gittis (11.09.1918 — 22.11.1918),
- Alexander Samoylo (22.11.1918 — 02.05.1919),
- Vasily Glagolev (10 June — 20 August 1920),
- Alexander Samoylo (29.05.1919 — 15.04.1920).

=== Chief of Staff ===
- Alexander Samoylo (11.09.1918 — 22.11.1918),
- Nikolai Petin (29.11.1918 — 23.05.1919)
- Ivan Yatsko (23.05.1919 — 27.10.1919)
- Nikolai Lisovsky (27.10.1919 — 22.11.1919)
- Ivan Yatsko (22.11.1919 — 02.01.1920)
- Nikolai Lisovsky (02.01.1920 — 15.04.1920).

Members of the Revolutionary Military Council include

- Nikolai Kuzmin (11.09.1918 — 15.04.1919 and 14.12.1919 — 07.04.1920)

== Second Formation ==
The 6th Army was formed a second time on 19 August 1920. The army was included in the newly formed Southern Front against General Wrangel. The headquarters were located in Kremenchuk (September), Berislav (September - November), Chaplynka (November) and Kherson (December 1920 - May 1921).

In September–October 1920, the 6th Army fought defensively, holding the Kakhovka bridgehead and stopping the White forces' attempts to force the Dnieper. It also supported the 2nd Cavalry Army in defeating the Zadneprovsky group of Wrangel's forces. During the counter-offensive of the Southern Front in Northern Tavria, the army occupied Perekop and facilitated the advance of the 1st and 2nd Cavalry armies.

In the Siege of Perekop (1920) (November 7–17, 1920), the 6th Army inflicted the main blow on the night of November 8, in crossing the Syvash and capturing the Perekop Isthmus. After the end of the hostilities in the Crimea, the 6th Army protected the Black Sea coast and fought against rebels in the Kherson and Odessa provinces.

On May 13, 1921, the 6th Army was disbanded and the administration and troops were transferred to the Kharkov Military District.

=== Commanders ===
- Konstantin Avksentevsky (20.08.1920 — 26.10.1920),
- August Kork (26.10.1920 — 13.05.1921).

=== Chief of Staff ===
- Tokarevsky V.K. (19.08.1920 — 03.12.1920)
- Kirpichnikov A.V. (03.12.1920 — 13.05.1921).

Members of the Revolutionary Military Council include

- Georgy Pyatakov (26.10.1920 — 03.12.1920)
- Volodymyr Zatonsky (18.12.1920 — 13.01.1920)
