= 64th Infantry Division (Russian Empire) =

- 64-я пехотная дивизия
- Active: 1914–1918
- Country: Russian Empire
- Branch: Russian Imperial Army
- Role: Infantry

The 64th Infantry Division (Russian: 64-я пехотная дивизия, 64-ya Pekhotnaya Diviziya) was an infantry formation of the Russian Imperial Army.

== Organization ==
- 1st Brigade
  - 253rd Infantry Regiment
  - 254th Infantry Regiment
- 2nd Brigade
  - 255th Infantry Regiment
  - 256th Infantry Regiment
