= Sergey Kamenev =

Soviet military leader (1881–1936)

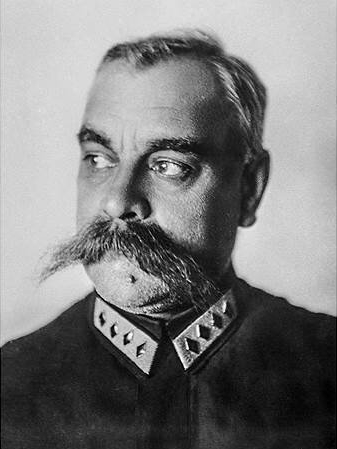
- Born: 16 April 1881; Kiev, Russian Empire
- Died: 25 August 1936 (aged 55); Moscow, Soviet Union
- Military career
- Allegiance: Russian Empire (1891–1917); Russian SFSR (1917–1922); Soviet Union (1922–1936)
- Branch: Imperial Russian Army; Red Army
- Service years: 1898–1936
- Rank: Polkovnik (Russia); Komandarm 1st rank (Soviet)
- Conflicts: World War I; Polish-Soviet War; Russian Civil War; Basmachi Rebellion; Enver Pasha's Rebellion
- Awards: Order of the Red Star; Order of the Red Banner

Sergey Sergeyevich Kamenev (Russian: Серге́й Серге́евич Ка́менев; April 16 [O.S. April 4], 1881 – August 25, 1936) was a Soviet military leader who reached Komandarm 1st rank.

Kamenev was born in Kiev. In World War I he commanded a regiment in the rank of colonel. He became a member of the All-Union Communist Party (Bolsheviks) in 1918. In July 1919, Kamenev replaced Jukums Vācietis as Commander-in-chief of the Red Army during the Russian Civil War. Kamenev was a member of the Revolutionary Military Council of the USSR from April 1924 to May 1927. He died of a heart attack on 25 August 1936 following the Trial of the Sixteen, incidentally on the same day that Lev Kamenev (no relation) and Grigory Zinoviev were executed.

== Early life ==
Kamenev was born in Kiev in a noble family, the son of a mechanical engineer at the Kiev plant "Arsenal", a Colonel of artillery. He dreamed of becoming a surgeon as a child, but ultimately chose a military career. He graduated from the Vladimir Kiev Cadet Corps (1898), the elite Aleksandrovsk Military School (1900, finished third in his class) and started military service in his native Kiev. After serving in the 165th Lutsk Infantry Regiment, he entered the Nicholas General Staff Academy and graduated with 1st category honors in 1907, then served in combat roles before being assigned to the General Staff.

Prior to World War I, he served as assistant senior adjutant of the staff of the Irkutsk Military District, of the 2nd Cavalry Division, and the Vilna Military District. In addition, Kamenev taught tactics and topography at a military school. In the pre-war period, Kamenev participated in numerous maneuvers and field trips, which significantly expanded his horizons and training as a general staff officer and commander. During these trips, Kamenev visited the fortresses of Kaunas and Grodno. He studied the unfortunate experience of the participation of the Russian army in the war with Japan.

== World War I ==
Kamenev went to the front of the First World War in the rank of captain. He served as a senior aide to the operational department of the 1st Army, commanded the 30th Poltava Infantry Regiment. According to the certification in connection with the service at the headquarters of the 1st Army, Kamenev was assessed by the authorities as "in all respects an outstanding General Staff officer and an excellent combat commander", and was considered worthy of promotion to general officer rank.

As the regiment's colonel, Kamenev command was characterized by adherence to military discipline and oversighting personnel welfare. In 1917 he was elected as commander of the regiment due to a process that was noticed during the period of managing the unit's daily operations and living conditions of soldiers.

Kamenev held the post of Chief of Staff of the XV Army Corps (in this position he met the events of October 1917), Chief of Staff of the 3rd Army. During this period, Kamenev mainly had to deal with the issues of demobilization of troops. The army headquarters was located in Polotsk, but due to the German offensive, it was evacuated to Nizhny Novgorod, where Kamenev's service in the Imperial Army ended.

== In the Red Army ==
With experience of working with soldiers' soviets, Kamenev fairly early joined the Reds as a military specialist, voluntarily enlisting in the Red Army. Apparently, he considered it necessary to continue the fight against an external enemy, but initially he did not seek to be involved in the Civil War. (The name Kamenev was also used as a pseudonym by a prominent Bolshevik, a member of the Politburo and chairman of the Moscow Soviet, to whom Sergey Kamenev was not related).

From April 1918, Kamenev served in the Western Front, covering the territory of Soviet Russia from the possible resumption of war with Germany. From the very beginning of the new service, Kamenev was confronted with the ills of the first period of the Red Army's existence – partisanship, disobedience, the presence of criminal elements in subordinate units, desertion.

In August 1918, Kamenev was appointed assistant to the military leader of the Western Curtain, Vladimir Yegoryev and military director of the Smolensk region with the subordination of the Nevelsk, Vitebsk and Roslavl districts. Kamenev's task at that time was to take over the counties of the Vitebsk province from the Germans who left them, as well as the formation of divisions for the Red Army. In a short time, under his leadership, the Vitebsk division and the Roslavl detachment were formed and sent to the Eastern Front.

== Victory against Kolchak ==
Kamenev was noticed and began to be promoted to major posts in the autumn of 1918. It was then, in September 1918, that he was entrusted with the key post of commander of the Eastern Front at that time. He succeeded Jukums Vācietis, who became commander in chief. The fight against the Whites unfolded in the Volga region, and already in October 1918, the front troops drove the enemy from the Volga to the East. In late 1918 – early 1919, the Reds captured Ufa and Orenburg. However, in connection with the spring offensive of Kolchak's armies, these cities had to be abandoned, and the front again rolled back to the Volga region.

In the 1919 campaign, Kamenev played an important role in the victory over the armies of Admiral Kolchak on the Eastern Front. He led the successful Counteroffensive of Eastern Front that pushed Kolchak east of the Urals. Kamenev requested that he be allowed to pursue Kolchak into Siberia, but Trotsky and Vācietis forbade this, fearing an ambush (Trotsky later admitted that Kamenev was right). By that point, Kamenev had earned the support of Lenin.

In the war of modern large armies, for the actual defeat of the enemy we need a sum of continuous and systematic victories on the whole front of the struggle, consistently complementing one another and interconnected in time ... Our 5th Army was almost defeated by Admiral Kolchak. Denikin almost destroyed the entire right flank of the Southern Front. Wrangel had disrupted our 13th Army to the last. And yet the victory was not for Kolchak, not for Denikin, and not for Wrangel. The side that managed to sum up their blows won, inflicting those continuously and thus not allowing the enemy to heal their wounds.

— Sergey Kamenev, in 1921

== Commander-in-Chief of the Red Army ==
By his own admission, Kamenev was not well versed in the political situation, which he saw "as if in a fog." An important role in Kamenev's political development was played by a member of the RVS of the Eastern Front, S.I. Gusev. In July 1919, as a result of the scandalous "affair" of the Field Headquarters of the Republic's Revolutionary Military Council, which became a manifestation of the political struggle of the groups in the Bolshevik elite, commander-in-chief Jukums Vācietis was deposed and arrested along with his closest associates. Kamenev became the new commander in chief of all armed forces. It was the Bolsheviks Sergey Gusev and Ivar Smilga, Kamenev's comrades from the RVS of the Eastern Front, that influenced Lenin to take this decision. As a result, Kamenev was on the post of commander in chief – the highest position in Soviet Russia on which a non-party military officer could count. Pavel Pavlovich Lebedev, a former Tsarist general and talented General Staff Officer, became the closest ally of Kamenev in the Civil War, being his chief-of-staff both on the Eastern Front and as commander in chief.

Kamenev led the fight against the forces of General Anton Denikin, then advancing on Moscow. Already when he was on the Eastern Front, he had drafted a plan to fight Denikin, which included actions to prevent his formation with Kolchak's armies. By the time Kamenev was appointed commander-in-chief, such a plan was already outdated, since Kolchak was defeated, and his connection with the White armies of southern Russia already seemed unlikely. Nevertheless, Kamenev showed great stubbornness in defending his plan, which provided for an offensive through the Don region, where the Reds were most fiercely resisted by the anti-Bolshevik-minded Cossacks. Kamenev's plan was opposed by Leon Trotsky, but supported by Vladimir Lenin, who had little understanding of strategic issues. As a result, the Reds failed the August offensive of the Southern Front, and the Whites reached the distant approaches to Moscow (reached Orel and Mtsensk, which threatened the main Soviet arsenal – Tula), putting the existence of Soviet Russia at risk.

Plans had to be urgently changed and the situation was saved through coordinated actions of the fronts, as a result of which a turning point was reached. As commander in chief, Kamenev led the struggle on other fronts – against General Yudenich near Petrograd, against the Poles during the Soviet-Polish war (Kamenev developed the plans for an attack on Poland), against General Wrangel in the South (in the latter case, Kamenev personally participated in the planning of the Perekop-Chongarskoy operation). After the end of the large-scale civil war in November 1920, Kamenev led operations to eliminate banditry, peasant insurrections, to suppress the uprising in Karelia (went personally to the theater of military operations). He was sent to Bukhara to purge the Bukhara Party, military, and militia of Pan-Turkist and Pan-Islamist elements, and to direct operations against Enver Pasha himself. A squadron of four aircraft, two Nieuport fighters and two 1½-Strutters was sent to southern Bukhara to provide support against Basmachis. While stationed in Turkestan, he led operations against the Basmachi movement. During the campaign, Enver Pasha, who attempted to rally resistance under Pan-Islamic slogans was defeated and killed.

== Assessment ==
An important assessment of Kamenev was given by War Commissar Leon Trotsky:

It is difficult to say which of the two colonels (Vācietis and Kamenev) was more talented. Both possessed undoubted strategic qualities, both had experience of a great war, both were distinguished by an optimistic temperament, without which it is impossible to command. Vācietis was more stubborn, capricious, and undoubtedly succumbed to the influence of elements hostile to the revolution. Kamenev was incomparably easier and easily succumbed to the influence of the Communists who worked with him ... Kamenev was undoubtedly a capable commander, with strategic imagination and ability to take risks. He lacked depth and firmness.

In general, Kamenev enjoyed the trust of Lenin. It was under Kamenev that the Red Army overcame all its enemies and emerged victorious from the Civil War. He was an active supporter of offensive strategy as the only possible way of conducting military operations in the Civil War. A major military administrator, due to the gravity of the conditions of the Civil War, he was forced to behave with extreme caution in relation to the party leadership, to carry favor with the party elite.

== Awards ==
For his activities during the Civil War, Kamenev was awarded the Order of the Red Banner. He had more rare awards, testifying to his special services to Soviet Russia. So, in April 1920, Kamenev was awarded the Golden Weapon of Honor (saber) from the Central Executive Committee for victories on the Eastern Front, and in January 1921 received a Mauser pistol of honor with a sign of the Order of the Red Banner on the handle.

In the summer of 1922, Kamenev received the Order of the Red Star of the 1st degree of the Bukhara People's Soviet Republic for organizing the struggle against Enver Pasha, and in September 1922 he decorated his chest with the military order of the Red Banner of the Khorezm autonomous Soviet republic for "helping the Khorezm working people in their struggle for liberation and for his merits in the struggle against the enemies of the working people of the whole world." Along with Semyon Budyonny, he was the most decorated Red officer of the Civil War.

== Later life ==
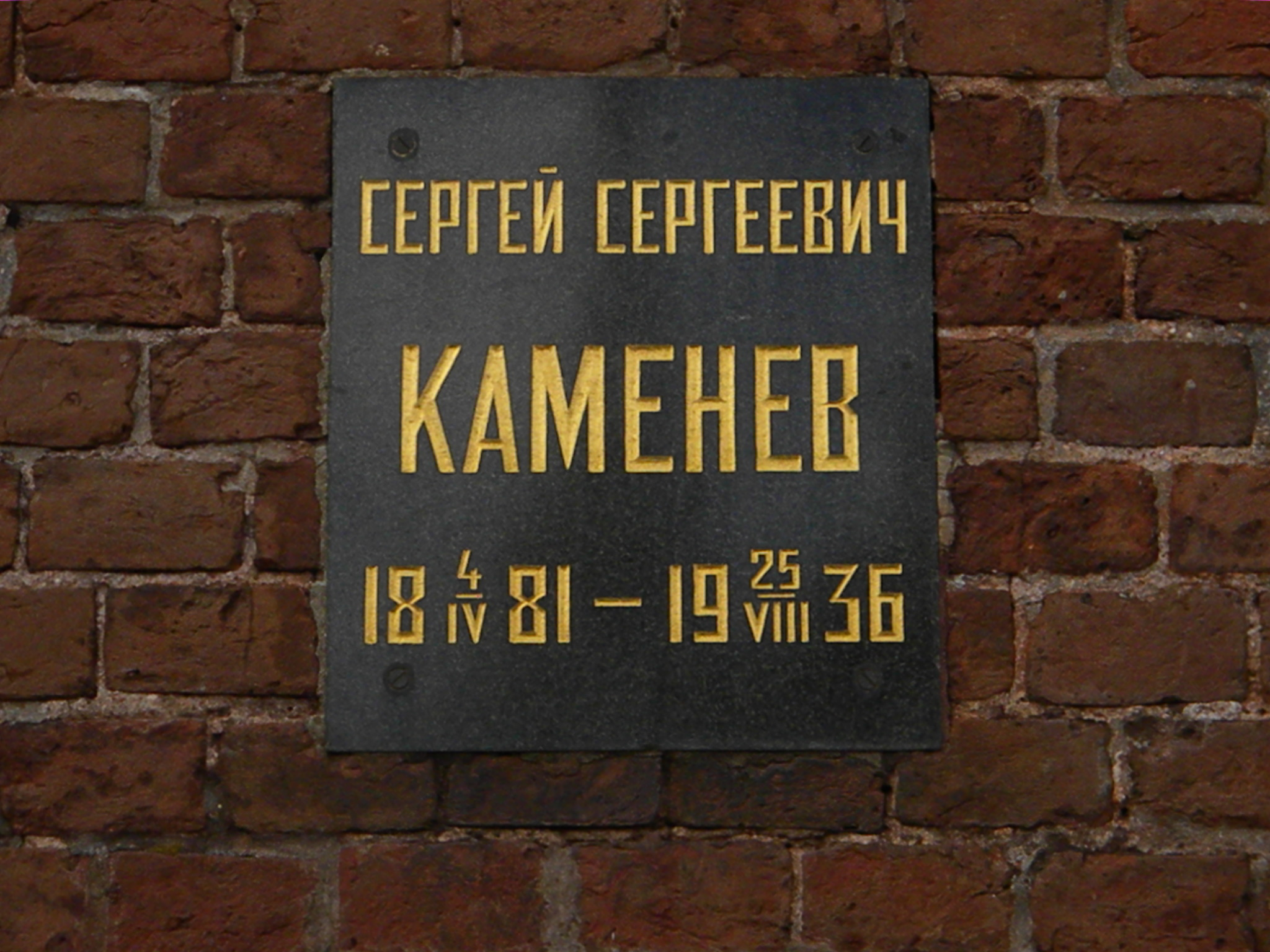
Grave of Sergey Kamenev in the Kremlin Wall Necropolis

After the Civil War, Kamenev continued to work to strengthen the Red Army. In his military-scientific works and lectures he rethought the experience of the First World War and the Civil War. Participated in the development of new regulations for the Red Army, after the elimination of the post of commander in chief in March 1924, he served as inspector of the Red Army, Chief of Staff of the Red Army, Deputy Commissar for Military and Naval Affairs and Chairman of the Frunze Military Academy. From 1934 to 1936 he was Head of the Air Defense Directorate of the Red Army. In this last position, Kamenev made a significant contribution to improving the country's defense capability, with his air defense troops being re-equipped with new equipment. Kamenev was one of the founders of the famous Osoaviakhim (the Society for the Promotion of Defense, Aviation and Chemical Construction – the Soviet voluntary public organization engaged in supporting the army and the military industry), and contributed to the organization of the development of the Arctic as chairman of the government's Arctic Commission. Consisted as the chairman of the commission on large flights, organized by Osoaviakhim. The last military rank of Kamenev in the Imperial Army was the rank of colonel, in the Red Army – Komandarm 1st rank (General of the Army).

Kamenev joined the Communist Party of the Soviet Union only in 1930 and, in general, his fate in the Soviet era was successful, unlike dozens of his colleagues. Kamenev died as a result of a heart attack before he himself could fall victim to the Great Purge and he did not go through the slander, humiliation and betrayal that so many of his comrades did. Kamenev's ashes were buried in the Kremlin Wall Necropolis. Nevertheless, posthumously – from 1937 until Joseph Stalin's death – Kamenev was counted among the "enemies of the people", and his name and works for several decades turned out to be forgotten. Subsequently, the name of Kamenev was rehabilitated.

== Military career ==
- Civil War (1918–1919): Commander of Eastern Front
- 1919–1924: Commander-in-chief of the Armed Forces of the Republic
- 14 February 1919 – 18 March 1921: Polish–Soviet War
- Spring 1922 – July 1922: Struggle against Enver Pasha's forces in Basmachi movement
- April 1924 – March 1925: Inspector of the Red Army
- March 1925 – November 1925: Chief of the Staff of the Red Army
- November 1925 – August 1926: Chief Inspector of the Red Army
- August 1926 – May 1927: Chief of the Main Directorate of the Red Army
- May 1927 – June 1934: Undersecretary in Ministry of Military and Navy Forces and deputy chairman of the Revolutionary Military Council of the USSR
- From 1934: Head of the Air Defence Department of Red Army

== Decorations ==
- Honorary Revolutionary Weapon (sword and pistol) with decoration of the Order of the Red Banner
- Order of the Red Banner of the RSFSR
- Order of the Red Banner of the Khorezm SSR
- Red Crescent First Class of the Bukhara People's Soviet Republic.

Military offices
Preceded by Mikhail Frunze	Chief of the Staff of the Red Army; January–November 1925	Succeeded by Mikhail Tukhachevsky
