= Pavel Lebedev (general) =

Russian-Soviet military commander (1872–1933)

Pavel Pavlovich Lebedev
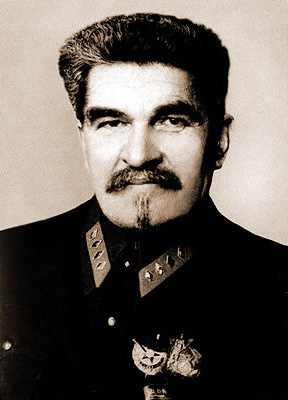
- Pavel Lebedev
- Born: 21 April 1872; Cheboksary, Chuvashia, Russian Empire
- Died: 2 July 1933 (aged 61); Kharkiv, Ukrainian SSR, Soviet Union
- Military career
- Allegiance: Russian Empire (1892–1917); Soviet Russia (1918–1922); Soviet Union (1922–1933)
- Branch: Imperial Russian Army; Soviet Army
- Service years: 1892–1933
- Unit: General Staff of the Soviet Armed Forces
- Conflicts: World War I Russian Civil War

Pavel Pavlovich Lebedev (Russian: Павел Павлович Лебедев; 21 April 1872 – 2 July 1933) was a Russian and Soviet military leader, Chief of the General Staff of the Soviet Army from 1919 to 1924.

== Biography ==
He was born to a poor nobility, and was raised as a Russian Orthodox. At age 12 he studied at public expense in the Nizhny Novgorod Count Arakcheev Cadet Corps, after which became a cadet of the Moscow Alexandrovsky Military School. He graduated from his studies in 1892, with the rank of lieutenant was sent to the Moscow Guard Regiment. In 1897 he entered the General Staff Academy, which he graduated with honors in 1900. Promoted to staff-captains and added to the General Staff. Due to his ability to make a brilliant career, in 1914 he was already a colonel and served as Head of the 12th Department of the General Staff. During the First World War, 1914–1918 - Operations Chief Quartermaster General Staff of the Southwestern Front, Chief of Staff of the 3rd Army, General instructions for when the armies of the Civil Code of the Southwestern Front, Assistant Quartermaster General Staff of the North-Western Front, General -kvartirmeyster staff of the Western Front. At the front he was wounded. In 1915, promoted to major general. In December 1917, he dismissed and moved to his family in Yeisk.

=== Russian Revolution and Soviet period ===
In 1918 he refused to join the White movement and voluntarily joined the Red Army at the personal invitation of Vladimir Lenin. He served as Chief of Mobilization Management (1918–1919), Chief of Staff (April–July 1919) and commander (July 1919) of the Eastern front, the Chief of the Staff of the Red Army of the Republic (1919–1924), at the same time (from March 1923 to February 1924) he was a member of the Revolutionary Military Council of the USSR.

He participated in the planning and conduct of operations to defeat the White forces of Alexander Kolchak, Anton Denikin and Nikolai Yudenich. He is considered one of the planners of the Orel–Kursk operation in October 1919, during which Denikin's offensive on Moscow was stopped and pushed back. All that time during the Civil War, Lebedev worked in a very busy schedule, seven days a week, coming home at four o'clock in the morning.

In 1922–1924 he concurrently headed the Military Academy. In the years 1924–1925 was for critical assignments for the RVS USSR. In the years 1925–1928 the chief of staff and assistant commander of the Ukrainian Military District Iona Yakir. He was a member of the All-Ukrainian Central Executive Committee. By order of the Revolutionary Military Council of the USSR dated July 3, 1933, the name of P.P. Lebedev was assigned to the Kiev artillery school, which became known as the Kiev artillery school named after comrade Lebedeva.

He died in Kharkiv.

Military offices
| Preceded by Office established | Chief of the Staff of the Red Army; April 1924 – January 1925 | Succeeded by Sergey Kamenev |
