= Prikamye =

Prikamye (Russian: Прикамье) is a region near the Kama river to the west of the Ural Mountains.

The literal translation of the name "Prikamye" is an area near the Kama river.

The word "Prikamye" is often used as synonym of Perm Krai.
