= Alexander Samoylo =

Russian and Soviet general (1869–1963)

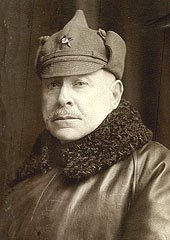
- Born: 4 November 1869; Moscow, Russian Empire
- Died: 8 November 1963 (aged 94); Moscow, Russian SFSR, Soviet Union
- Military career
- Allegiance: Russian Empire; Soviet Russia; Soviet Union
- Branch: Imperial Russian Army; Soviet Army; Soviet Air Force
- Rank: Major General (Russian Empire); Lieutenant General (Soviet Union)
- Conflicts: World War I Russian Civil War

Alexander Alexandrovich Samoylo (Russian: Алекса́ндр Алекса́ндрович Само́йло; November 4, [O.S. October 23] 1869 – November 8, 1963) was a commander in the Imperial Russian Army and Red Army during World War I and the Russian Civil War.

Before the 1917 Russian Revolution, he was a major general on the general staff and Chief of Staff of the 10th Army. After the Russian Revolution, he was made commander of the 6th Red Army on the Northern Front between 22 November 1918 and 15 April 1920. In that capacity, he fought against the Allied intervention in Northern Russia. He also commanded the Red Army Eastern front during 4 weeks in May 1919.

In 1940, he became lieutenant general of aviation and in 1943 a professor. He was a member of the Communist Party of the Soviet Union from 1944 onwards. He was a recipient of the Order of Lenin, the Order of the Red Banner and the Order of the Patriotic War.

== Sources ==
- Ministry of Defense of Russia. Military Encyclopedia. Entry on Alexander Samoylo (in Russian)
