= Nikolai Sollogub =

Soviet military commander (1883–1937)

- Born: 16 May [O.S. 4 May] 1883; Minsk Governorate, Russian Empire
- Died: 7 August 1937 (aged 54); Moscow, Russian SFSR, Soviet Union
- Military career
- Allegiance: Russian Empire (1914–1917); Soviet Russia (1917–1922); USSR (1922–1937)
- Service years: 1900–1937
- Rank: Komdiv
- Commands: World War I; 1st Army; 11th Army; Western Front; Polish-Soviet War; 16th Army
- Conflicts: World War I; Western Front; Polish–Soviet War

Nikolai Vladimirovich Sollogub (Russian: Николай Владимирович Соллогуб; 16 May [O.S. 4 May] 1883 – 7 August 1937) was a Soviet military specialist who served in World War I, the Russian Civil War, and the Polish–Soviet War, reaching the rank of Komdiv in the Red Army. During the Great Purge he was imprisoned and executed.

== Biography ==
Sollogub was born into a Russian noble family in the Minsk Governorate of the Russian Empire. He entered military service on 31 August 1900, later graduating from the prestigious Pavlovsk Military School in 1902 and the Nikolaev Academy of the General Staff, Russia's senior staff college, in 1910. During World War I, he served in several staff posts with the 1st Army. In January 1917 he joined the staff of the quartermaster general of the Special Army before transferring to a similar post with the 11th Army from August to September. During the Civil War he voluntarily joined the ranks of the Red Army. From September to December he was a staff officer for the Western Front army group under Alexander Miasnikian.

Sollogub joined the Red Army in early 1918 and initially served as the first chief of staff of the Eastern Front from June to July. From August he was a member of the Supreme Military Inspectorate of the Red Army and a lecturer at the Red Military Academy.

In May 1919 he was attached to the chief of staff of the Western Front before receiving command of the 16th Army during the Polish-Soviet War in August. Under his command the army advanced westwards into Poland before being thrown back during the Battle of Warsaw. In October 1920 he became chief of staff of the Western Front and in December became chief of staff for all forces in Ukraine and Crimea. In 1922 he became assistant chief of the Red Military Academy, renamed in 1925 as the M. V. Frunze Military Academy honoring Mikhail Frunze.

Sollogub worked as an instructor for the rest of his career. During the Great Purge he was arrested, tried in secret, and sentenced to death. He was executed in 1937.
