= Pyotr Baranov =

Soviet Air Force commander and politician

- Russian: Пётр Ионович Баранов
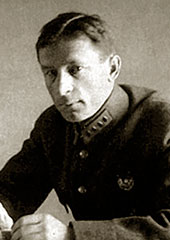
- Born: 22 September 1892; Saint Petersburg, Russian Empire
- Died: 5 September 1933 (aged 40); Moscow, Russian SFSR, Soviet Union
- Burial place: Kremlin Wall Necropolis
- Military career
- Allegiance: Soviet Union
- Branch: Soviet Air Force
- Service years: 1915–1933
- Rank: Colonel
- Commands: Soviet Air Forces
- Conflicts: World War I; Russian Civil War; Basmachi Revolt
- Awards: Order of Lenin Order of the Red Banner

Pyotr Ionovich Baranov (Russian: Пётр Ионович Баранов; 22 September 1892 – 5 September 1933) was a Soviet military commander and politician who was one of the main creators and organizers of the Air Force and the aircraft industry of the Soviet Union.

== Biography ==
Baranov was born in to a poor working-class family and himself became a worker from a young age. In 1912 he became a member of the Bolshevik faction of the Russian Social Democratic Labour. He was arrested in 1913 and was deported from Saint Petersburg for his revolutionary activities and was not allowed to live in large cities.

In 1915 Baranov was mobilized in the Imperial Russian Army. He deserted and conducted illegal revolutionary activities in Kharkiv. In 1916 he was once again arrested for revolutionary agitation and sentenced by a court-martial to eight years of hard labor, but was released after the February Revolution.

In September 1917, Baranov was the chairman of the front-line department of the Soviet of Soldiers' Deputies of the Romanian Front, and from October of the same year he was a member of the Revolutionary Committee and the RSDLP (b) committee of the 8th Army. In 1918 he joined the ranks of the Red Army. From April 7 to April 20, he commanded the Donetsk army of the Donetsk–Krivoy Rog Soviet Republic, which repulsed the offensive of the Austro-German troops in the Donbass. From 1919 to 1920 he was successively commissar of the headquarters of the 4th Army, a member of the Revolutionary Military Council of the 8th Army, the Southern Group of the Eastern Front, the Turkestan Front and 1st and 14th armies. In 1921, Baranov worked as the head of the political department of the troops of Ukraine and Crimea.

Baranov was a delegate of the 10th Congress of the RCP (b) and participated in the suppression of the Kronstadt uprising for which he was awarded the Order of the Red Banner.

From 1921 to 1922 he was a member of the Revolutionary Military Council of the Turkestan Front and the Central Asian Bureau of the Central Committee of the RCP (b). He led the units of the Red Army in military operations against the Basmachi and was awarded the military order of the Khorezm Soviet Republic.

In 1923, Baranov was appointed chief and commissar of the armored forces of the Red Army. In August of the same year, he was appointed deputy chief, and from December 10, 1924, he was acting chief of the Red Army Air Force. On March 2, 1925, he was appointed Commander-in-Chief. He headed the Air Force until June 1931. On April 15, 1925, in Moscow, Baranov signed a document establishing the Lipetsk German aviation school. At the same time, from 1925 to 1931, he was a member of the Revolutionary Military Council of the USSR.

In 1924-1925 he was a member of the Central Control Commission of the All-Union Communist Party (b) and from 1927 a candidate member of the Central Committee of the VKP (b) .

From June 6, 1931, Pyotr Baranov was a member of the Presidium of the Supreme Council of the National Economy of the Soviet Union and the head of the All-Union Aviation Association. In January 1932, he was appointed Deputy People's Commissar for Heavy Industry and Head of the Main Directorate of the Aviation Industry.

On September 5, 1933, he and his wife, Belaya Moiseevna Baranova (Berkovich), died in a plane crash near Podolsk, Moscow Region. His ashes were brought in Moscow on Red Square near the Kremlin Wall.
