= Khatunarkh =

Khatunarkh may refer to:

- Gay, Armenia, formerly Khatunarkh
- Nerkin Khatunarkh, Armenia
- Aknashen, Armenia, formerly Verin Khatunarkh
