= 1st Army (RSFSR) =

- Active: March - May 1918; 19 June 1918 - January 1921.
- Country: Russian Soviet Federative Socialist Republic
- Branch: Red Army
- Part of: Eastern Front (RSFSR) (1918-1919); Turkestan Front (1919-1921).
- Seat of the Mobilization Department: Saransk
- Engagements: Russian Civil War

Commanders
- Notable commanders: Mikhail Tukhachevsky; Hayk Bzhishkyan; Georgy Zinoviev; Pavel Zakharov; Joseph Blazevich

The 1st Army was a field army of the Red Army during the Russian Civil War. The 1st Army was formed twice. The first formation was between the beginning of March 1918 and May as a reaction to the Austro-German occupation of Ukraine. The second formation was created on June 19, 1918, as a part of the Eastern Front and from August 15, 1919 as a part of the Turkestan Front. The Army was disbanded in January 1921.

== History ==
On March 17, 1918, the Second All-Ukrainian Congress of Soviets decided to create armed forces to counter foreign and contra-revolutionary forces. Five armies of some 3.000 -3.500 men were created. In fact, these armies were only brigades with limited combat capabilities. Asiyev became the commander of the 1st Army, which was stationed near Podilsk and counted some 30.000 men shortly before it was disbanded. In March 1918, there were some skirmishes with German troops near Odessa, but the army was forced to retreat to Taganrog and Rostov-on-Don.

On June 19, 1918 the 1st Army was created a second time from the detachments and units acting in the Syzran - Simbirsk area against Czechoslovak and White Guards troops. During the Civil War, Saransk was one of the centers of formation of military units of the Red Army and the mobilization Department of the 1st Army operated in that city.

In 1918, the 1st Army waged hostilities in the Volga region against the White Guards and the Czechoslovak Corps. It participated in the offensive of the Eastern Front 1918-1919, and led the attack in the Simbirsk and Syzran-Samara combat operations. The 1st Army took Samara (September-October 1918), Sterlitamak (December 1918) and Orenburg (January 1919). In the spring of 1919 during the Spring Offensive of the White Russian Army it held defensive positions in the Sterlitamak and Orenburg area. In April-June 1919, the Army participated in the Counteroffensive of the Eastern front and waged fights against the forces of Alexander Kolchak's Southern Army, conducting an offensive in the Buguruslan and Belebey operations.

In August-September 1919, she operated as a part of the Turkestan Front, participating in the defeat of Alexander Kolchak's Southern Army and the Ural Army. During the Aktyubinsk operation, the 1st Army connected on September 13 with the troops of the Turkestan Soviet Republic in the Mugodzhar Hills. Part of the troops of the 1st Army continued to fight against the Ural Army in the Ural region until April 1920, while another part of the troops participated in the Khiva and Bukhara operations in November 1919-March 1920, establishing Soviet power there by occupying the whole region. The army was later also involved in the suppression of the Basmachi movement.

The 1st Army was disbanded in January 1921.

=== Commanders ===
- Mikhail Tukhachevsky (28.06.1918 - 04.01.1919)
- Hayk Bzhishkyan (04.01.1919 — 25.05.1919)
- Georgy Zinoviev (25.05.1919 — 12.11.1920)
- Pavel Zakharov (12.11.1920 — 04.12.1919)
- Joseph Blazevich (04.12.1919 — 04.01.1920)
- Pavel Zakharov (04.01.1920 — 27.01.1920)

=== Revolutionary Military Council ===
Members of the Revolutionary Military Council included:

- Valerian Kuybyshev
- Sergei Medvedev
- Shalva Eliava
- Konstantin Avksentevsky
- Pyotr Baranov
