= Kherkhan =

Kherkhan Խերխան
- Xərxan
- Location within Azerbaijan
- Coordinates: 39°43′24″N 46°56′46″E
- Country: Azerbaijan
  - District: Khojavend

Population (2015)
  - Total: 140
- Time zone: UTC+4 (AZT)

Kherkhan (Armenian: Խերխան; Azerbaijani: Xərxan) is a village located in the Khojavend District of Azerbaijan, in the region of Nagorno-Karabakh. Until 2023 it was controlled by the breakaway Republic of Artsakh. The village had an ethnic Armenian-majority population until the expulsion of the Armenian population of Nagorno-Karabakh by Azerbaijan following the 2023 Azerbaijani offensive in Nagorno-Karabakh. The village lost 10% of its population as a result of both Nagorno-Karabakh wars.

== History ==
During the Soviet period, the village was a part of the Martuni District of the Nagorno-Karabakh Autonomous Oblast.

== Historical heritage sites ==
Historical heritage sites in and around the village include the cemetery of Khacher (Armenian: Խաչեր, lit. 'Crosses') from between the 11th and 14th centuries, the 19th-century St. George's Church (Armenian: Սուրբ Գևորգ եկեղեցի, romanized: Surb Gevorg Yekeghetsi), and a 19th-century spring monument.

== Economy and culture ==
The population is mainly engaged in agriculture and animal husbandry. As of 2015, the village has a municipal building, a house of culture, a school, and a medical centre.

== Demographics ==
The village had 111 inhabitants in 2005, and 140 inhabitants in 2015.

== Notable people ==
- Yakov Melkumov (1885 – 1962), Soviet military commander during the Russian Civil War's fighting against the Basmachi Movement on the Turkestan Front. He is known for commanding the unit that killed Enver Pasha.
