= Alexander Todorsky =

Alexander Ivanovich Todorsky
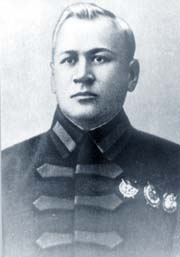
- Born: 8 September 1894; Vesyegonsky Uyezd, Tver Governorate, Russian Empire
- Died: 27 August 1965 (aged 70) Moscow, Soviet Union
- Allegiance: Russian Empire; Soviet Union
- Branch: Imperial Russian Army; Soviet Red Army
- Service years: 1914–1918 (Russian Empire); 1919–1955 (Soviet Union)
- Rank: lieutenant general
- Commands: 13th Rifle Corps
- Conflicts: World War I Russian Civil War; World War II

Alexander Ivanovich Todorsky (8 September 1894 – 27 August 1965) was a Soviet general and komkor (corps commander). He fought for the Imperial Russian Army in World War I before going over to the Bolsheviks in the subsequent Civil War.

== Biography ==
With the outbreak of the First World War, he volunteered for the army. He rose to the rank of captain. After the February Revolution, he was elected chairman of the regimental committee, and from November 1917 as the commander of the 5th Siberian Army Corps.

In October 1920, he fought against the rebels in Dagestan and in 1923, Todorsky was sent to Turkestan to fight the Basmachi at the head of the 13th Rifle Corps. In 1927, he was a graduate of the Frunze Military Academy.

Between 1934 and 1936, he was the head of the Zhukovsky Air Force Engineering Academy and between 1936 and 1938, of the Directorate of Higher Military Educational Institutions of the Red Army. In the summer of 1937, his wife was arrested [on what charges?], then his brother Ivan, and both were shot in the same year. At the beginning of September 1938, Todorsky was also arrested [on what charges?] and, as he did not admit his guilt and did not give the necessary evidence [what specifically?], was locked up for 15 years in labor camps. Having fully served his prison term, he was sent into exile in the Krasnoyarsk Territory, where he arrived on June 3, 1953. On April 11, 1955, Todorsky was summoned to Krasnoyarsk, where he was handed a certificate of rehabilitation, after which he immediately flew to Moscow. After complete rehabilitation, he was reinstated in the Soviet army, and in 1955 he retired with the rank of lieutenant general at the age of 61.

In the summer of 1956, he worked in the so-called Shvernik Commission and carried out the release and rehabilitation of Gulag prisoners, in particular from Kazakhstan.

He was a recipient of the Order of the Red Banner and the Order of the Red Star. He is buried at Novodevichy Cemetery.

Preceded by Nikolay Isovsky	Commander of the 13th Rifle Corps; 1923	Succeeded by Ivan Fedko
