= Ural Cossacks =

Cossack host by the Ural River

The Ural Cossacks, also known as the Yaik Cossacks, (Note: Russian: Ура́льские каза́ки (ура́льцы) (Uralskiye kazaki (uraltsy)); Ура́льское каза́чье во́йско (Uralskiye kazachye voisko), Яи́цкое каза́чье во́йско (Yaitskoye kazachye voisko); Bashkir: Урал казактары (уралец) (Ural kazktaryo (uralets)); Урал казак ғәскәре (Ural kazak ğəskərye), Яйыҡ казак ғәскәре (Yiyok kazak ğəskərye)) lived along the Ural River (historically called the Yaik) and formed a Cossack host with the same name.

== History ==
The Cossack community on the Yaik (later, Ural) River was established in the late 16th century. Its founders were a group of Volga Cossacks who incurred the wrath of the Muscovite state by conducting raids on the Volga. These Volga Cossacks fled across the Yaik to escape pursuing Muscovite troops. They attacked and captured Saraichik, a Nogai town on the lower Yaik, then moved south along the Yaik and founded Yaitsk (later, Uralsk, now Oral in Kazakhstan), their chief settlement. They soon reestablished their connection with Muscovy. In 1587, some of the Yaik Cossacks were serving in Astrakhan, and the Tsar declined to take punitive action against them after a complaint from the Nogai Khan. In 1591, 500 Yaik Cossacks participated in a Muscovite campaign. The Yaik Cossacks became official subjects of Muscovy sometime in the 17th century, when they received a charter grant from the Tsar for the territories around the Yaik and its tributaries.

The Yaik Cossacks, although speaking Russian and identifying themselves as being of primarily Russian ancestry, also incorporated many Tatars into their ranks. These Tatars might be both Chuvash people and Mishari (Meschera in Russian, Mişär in Tatar language); the latter had not only Muslims and Jews, but Christians among them to facilitate their merge with Russians. The Yaik Cossacks also allowed Kalmyk prisoners to join them on the condition that they be baptized to prove their changed loyalty. In 1717 they lost 1,500 men on the Alexander Bekovich-Cherkassky expedition to Khiva. A census in 1723 showed 3,196 men fit for military service. By 1725 the Yaik Cosssacks included men of Polish, Bashkir, Tatar, Kalmyk, Swedish, German, Mordvin and Turkish origin, in addition to runaway peasants from Ukraine and Russia and Don Cossack immigrants. In the 18th century, the Yaik Cossacks received minimal compensation from the state for their services, but they received significant income through fishing, animal husbandry, hunting, commerce, and grain farming.

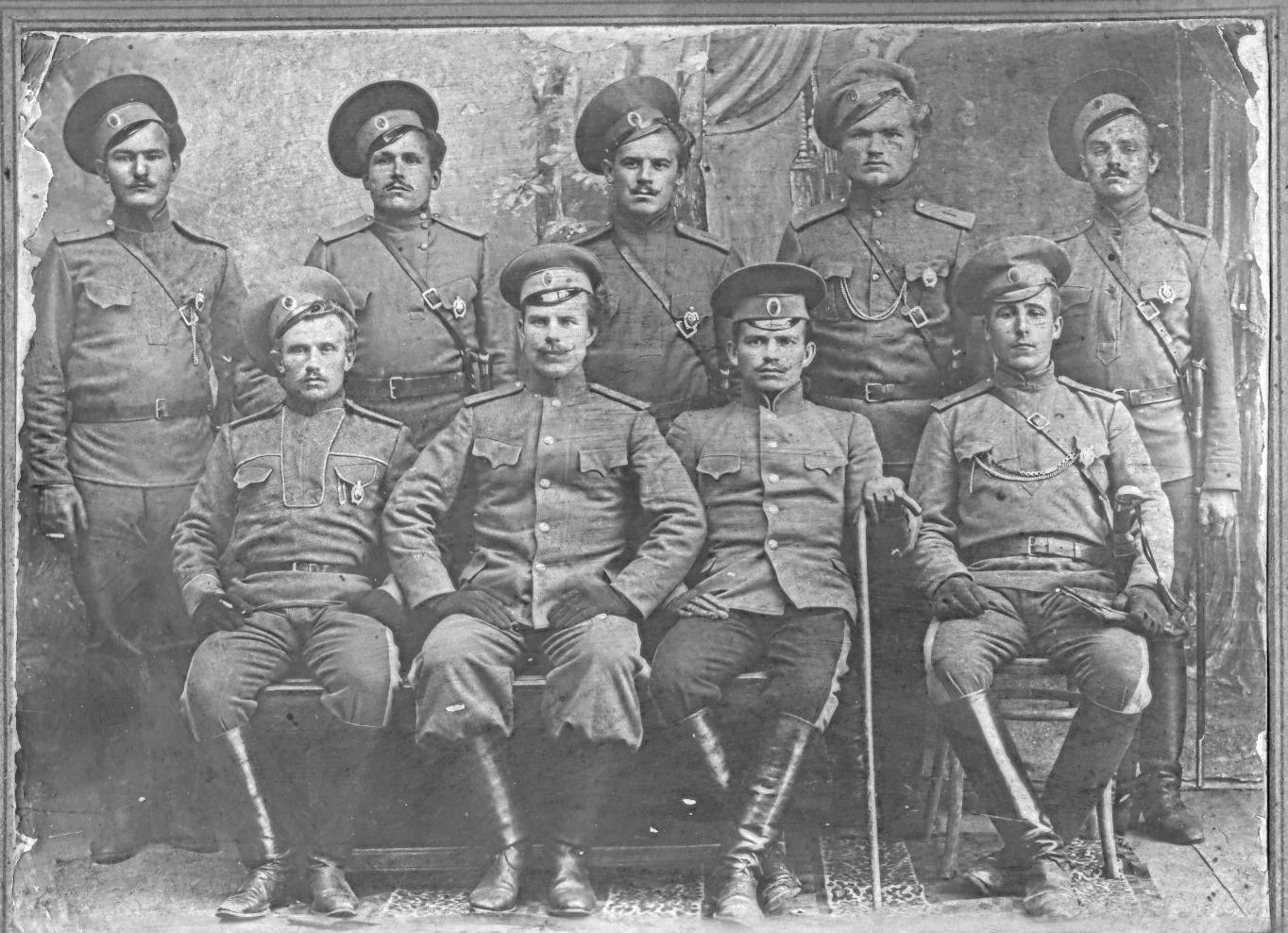
A group of Orenburg cossacks (1912), descendants of Yaik Cossacks from Sakmara settlement, founded by Yaik Cossacks before the foundation of Orenburg.

Yaik Cossacks were the driving force in the rebellion led by Yemelyan Pugachev in 1773–1774.

Their main livelihood was fishery and the taxation on it was a major source of friction between the Cossacks and the state. A revolt broke out in 1772, marked by the murder of General von Traubenberg. Traubenberg headed a commission which was to investigate and settle Cossack complaints and grievances, but his behaviour only antagonized them further. In reprisal, many were arrested, executed and outlawed. Pugachev appeared shortly after and managed to rally them to his cause.

The Yaik Cossacks were renamed as part of the Ural Host after the rebellion.

The Ural regiments later took part in Suvorov's Italian and Swiss expedition, the Great Patriotic War of 1812, the Russo-Turkish War, the November Uprising of 1830 and in the Crimean War. They also played a significant role in the Turkestan campaigns of the 1870s.

In the Ural-Guryev operation of 1919–1920, the Red Turkestan Front defeated the Ural Army, which was formed from Ural Cossacks and other troops which rebelled against the Bolsheviks. During winter 1920, Ural Cossacks and their families, totaling about 15,000 people, headed south along the eastern coast of the Caspian Sea towards Fort Alexandrovsk. Only a few hundred of them reached Persia in June 1920.

== Distinctions ==
The distinguishing colour of the Ural Host was crimson/red; worn on the cap bands, epaulettes and wide trouser stripes of a dark blue uniform of the loose-fitting cut common to the Steppe Cossacks. Individual regiments were distinguished by yellow numbers on the epaulettes. High fleece hats were worn on occasion with crimson cloth tops. No spurs were worn by the Ural and other cossack hosts. After 1907 a khaki-grey jacket was adopted for field uniform, worn with blue-grey breeches. The astrakhan hats and broad crimson/red trouser stripes of the peacetime uniform were however retained during World War I.
