= Yakov Melkumov =

Soviet military commander

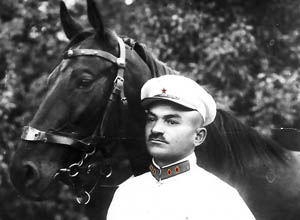
- Born: 24 December 1885; Kherkhan, Elisabethpol Governorate, Russian Empire
- Died: 3 July 1962 (aged 76); Moscow, Russian SFSR, Soviet Union
- Military career
- Allegiance: Russian Empire (1907–1917); Russian SFSR and Bolsheviks (1918–1922); Soviet Union (1922–1937)
- Service years: 1907–1937
- Rank: Komdiv (Division Commander)
- Conflicts: World War I; Russian Civil War; Basmachi Rebellion; Enver Pasha's Rebellion; Battle of Baljuvan (1922); Intervention in Afghanistan (1930)

Yakov Arkadievich Melkumov (Russian: Я́ков Арка́дьевич Мельку́мов; Armenian: Հակոբ Արշակի Մելքումյան Hakob Arshaki Melk’umyan; 24 December [O.S. 12 December] 1885 – 3 July 1962) was a Soviet military commander of Armenian origin. He fought in the First World War and the Russian Civil War. He particularly distinguished himself during the Russian Civil War fighting against the Basmachi movement on the Turkestan Front.

== His life ==
Melkumov was born to a working-class Armenian family in the village of Kherkhan, near the town of Shusha. His father Arshak was a bricklayer by profession. In 1890, his family moved to Ashgabat, where Yakov learned the Turkmen language and learned to ride a horse. In 1906 he graduated from the 6th grade of the gymnasium in Ashgabat. In 1907, he was drafted into the Imperial Russian Army, sent to study at the Nikolaev Cavalry School, and released into the regular army with the rank of cavalry staff captain (shtab-rotmistr). During the First World War, he commanded a machine-gun unit in the 4th Cavalry Division of the 6th Army Corps.

=== Russian Civil War ===
Melkumov joined the Bolshevik Party in 1918. In January that year, he took part in the suppression of the rebellion of General Alexey Kaledin in the Don region. As a member of the first "red detachments" of the Red Army, he fought in the earliest battles of the Russian Civil War. From April 1918 he was assistant chief of a cavalry detachment. In early July, he took part in the suppression of the Left Socialist-Revolutionary uprising in Moscow.

In October 1918, he became commander of the 1st Moscow Cavalry Regiment in the 12th Division of the 8th Army of the Red Army. He fought against General Anton Denikin's army on the Southern Front of the civil war near Voronezh.

=== Service in Central Asia ===
In October 1919 Melkumov became commander of a cavalry brigade in the 8th Army. In January 1920, he became the commander of the 1st Cavalry Brigade of the 1st Turkestan Cavalry Division, fighting on the Turkestan Front. From August to September 1920, Melkumov's cavalry brigade took part in the Bukhara operation to overthrow the Emir of Bukhara, Mohammed Alim Khan. In September 1920, he became the commander of the 2nd Cavalry Brigade of the 3rd Turkestan Cavalry Division. In February 1921, he took part in the defeat of Mohammed Alim Khan near the town of Boysun and the capture of the cities of Denau, Yurchi, Sary-Assiya, Karatag, Gissar and Dyushambe for which he was awarded his first Order of the Red Banner.

In June 1922, he commanded the 2nd Turkestan Cavalry Brigade during the offensive of the Red Army against the forces of Enver Pasha although there are other versions of Enver's death. For his military achievements during the Gissar campaign and for his defeat of Enver Pasha's army, Melkumov was awarded his second Order of the Red Banner.

From 1924 to 1926, he commanded the 8th Turkestan cavalry brigade. Then, on behalf of the Revolutionary Military Council, he formed the Turkestan National Cavalry Brigade and took over its command. From 1926 to 1931, as a division commander, he took part in the defeat of the Basmachi rebels in the territory of the Turkmen and Tajik Soviet Socialist Republics. In particular, in September 1931 he participated in a large-scale combined operation of the Red Army, the OGPU, border troops, cadets of the Tashkent military school and fighters of volunteer detachments to eliminate Basmachi forces on the territory of Turkmenistan and Khorezm under the general leadership of the commander of Central Asian Military District Pavel Dybenko. As a result of the operation in the Karakum Desert, 3,287 Basmachi were taken prisoner, killed or wounded. On June 20, 1930, Melkumov's cavalry brigade, in agreement with the Afghan government, invaded Afghanistan to strike at the Basmachi bases. In 1934, he graduated from the Frunze Military Academy. From 1934 to 1937, he was the assistant commander of the Central Asian Military District.

== Arrest and rehabilitation ==
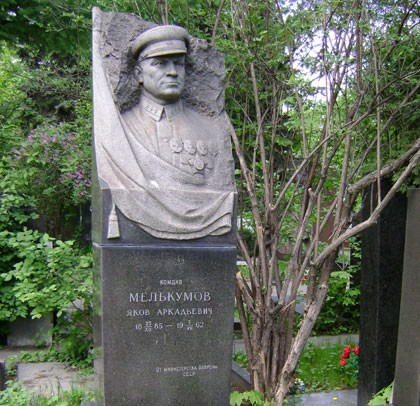
Melkumov's grave at Novodevichy Cemetery

In November 1937, during the Great Purge, Melkumov was arrested on charges of participation in a purported anti-Soviet nationalist organization, and in April 1940 was sentenced to be shot. After he appealed his sentence, the Military Collegium of the Supreme Court of the Soviet Union commuted his sentence to fifteen years of imprisonment in a labor camp.

He was released from imprisonment in 1954 and rehabilitated the next year. His former rank of division general, and all rewards were restored. He lived the rest of his life in Moscow. In 1960 he published his memoirs, Turkestantsy, in which his struggle against the Basmachi rebels in Central Asia is thoroughly covered. He died on July 3, 1962, in Moscow and was buried in Novodevichy Cemetery.

== Works ==
- Turkestantsy Туркестанцы [Turkestanians]. Voennye memuary (in Russian). Moscow: Voenizdat. 1960.

== Honours and awards ==
Order of the Red Banner, twice
Order of the Red Crescent, first degree, from the Bukharan People's Soviet Republic
Order of the Red Banner of Labour from the Turkmen SSR
Honorary weapon from the Revolutionary Military Council of the Turkmen SSR
