= 13th Rifle Corps =

Rifle corps of the Red Army (USSR)

The 13th Rifle Corps (Russian: 13-й стрелковый корпус) was a rifle corps of the Red Army, first formed in 1922.

On October 12, 1922, the Corps began forming in the Turkestan Front. Alexander Todorsky became the corps commander. The corps participated in the suppression of the Basmachi movement and was disbanded in 1935.

== 1922–1935 formation ==
On October 12, 1922, the Commander of the Turkestan Front issued Order No. 345 on the formation of the 13th Rifle Corps from units located in the Bukhara People's Republic and Samarkand Oblast. The headquarters was established in the city of Novaya Bukhara. The corps was led by its Revolutionary Military Council.

On October 12, 1922, the commander of the Turkestan Front issued Order No. 1436/575, in which the headquarters of the abolished Bukhara group of troops turned on the formation of Management 13th RC.

In April–May 1923, the Revolutionary Military Council in housing were subject to Bukhara of the Red Army.

Corps units were involved in the fight against Basmachis in Bukhara and Samarkand Oblasts. The Turkestan Front became the Central Asian Military District in June 1926, and the corps its assignment with the latter. Its headquarters moved to Samarkand in October 1926.

The corps headquarters was relocated to Kazan when it transferred to the Volga Military District in September 1927. Its headquarters was again shifted to Sverdlovsk in 1931 and there it briefly became part of the Ural Military District in July 1935 before being disbanded in the same month.

== First wartime formation (1936–1941) ==
The corps was reformed in the Kiev Military District (КВО) in accordance with Order No. 194 of the military district of December 5, 1936, assigned to the 12th Army. Headquarters was located in the city of Belaya Tserkov.

Reformed 1936, in 12th Army, Kiev Special Military District, under General Major N.K. Kirillov, with 44th, 58th, and 192nd Mountain Rifle Divisions on 22 June 1941. The corps headquarters was disbanded in August of that year.

== Second wartime formation (1942) and 31st Army Corps service ==
The corps headquarters was formed again on 13 October 1942 as part of the Transcaucasian Front, with which it spent the war.

For most of 1945, the corps included the 392nd Rifle Division and the 94th Rifle Brigade. On 1 January 1948, still with Transcaucasus Military District, comprising 10th Guards Rifle Division and 414th Rifle Division. The corps was redesignated as the 13th Mountain Rifle Corps in 1949. By 1951 it included the 10th Guards Mountain Rifle Division, and 145th Mountain Rifle Division, and was still in that configuration in 1954.

The 13th Mountain Rifle Corps was disbanded by being redesignated 31st Special Rifle Corps on 1 July 1956, and then successively 31st Special Army Corps (1 October 1957) and 31st Army Corps (9 May 1961).

In February 1962 the 145th Mountain Rifle Division was renamed the 145th Motor Rifle Division.

On 1 June 1962 the 10th Guards Mountain Rifle Division was renamed 10th Guards Motor Rifle Division.

Formations in 1970 included:

- 10th Guards Motor Rifle Division (Akhaltsikhe, Georgian SSR)
- 145th Motor Rifle Division (Batumi, Adjar Autonomous Soviet Socialist Republic)
- 147th Motor Rifle Division (Akhalkalaki, Georgian SSR)
- 6th Fortified Area (Akhaltsikhe, Georgian SSR)
- 8th Fortified Area (Batumi (Erge), Adjar Autonomous Soviet Socialist Republic)

== Commanders ==
- May 1923 - April 1925 : Alexander Todorsky
- April 1924 – November 1925: Ivan Fedko
- July 1930 – 1933?: Vitaly Primakov
- August 1932 – January 1934: Semyon Uritsky
- February 1934 – 1935: Andrei Sazontov
- February 1938 - August 1941 Nikolai Kirillov (Killed in action)

From 1983 to July 1984 Major General Mikhail Kolesnikov (politician) commanded the corps.
