= Soviet–Afghan War (disambiguation) =

The Soviet–Afghan War mainly refers to the war that lasted from 1979 to 1989. It may also refer to other Soviet–Afghan conflicts:

- Urtatagai conflict (1925–1926)
- Red Army intervention in Afghanistan (1929)
- Red Army intervention in Afghanistan (1930)
