= Red Banner Caucasus Army =

The Red Banner Caucasus Army (Russian: Краснознамённая Кавказская армия) was a Soviet army existing from 1921 to 1935. The army was named the Independent Caucasus Army on its creation, and carried this name until August 1923, when it was renamed the Red Banner Caucasus Army. It ceased to exist on May 17, 1935 when it was redesignated as the Transcaucasian Military District in connection with the overall reorganization of the Red Army.

The army consisted of 6 territorial divisions, an air force, and some reserve troops.

== History ==
The army was established at the end of May 1921 from the 11th Army, a unit of the Caucasus Front, which was dissolved on May 29, 1921. The army unified the territorial forces of the Transcaucasian Soviet Federated Socialist Republic (but in reality was under the control of the Russian Soviet Federated Socialist Republic, and later of the Soviet Union).

By order of the Central Executive Committee of the Soviet of workers, peasants, Cossacks and Red Army Deputies, on 22 September 1921 the Independent Caucasus Army (formerly 11th Army) is awarded a revolutionary red banner for the following distinctions: 11th Army, formed now into the Independent Caucasus Army, in 1919, on the Caucasus front against Denikin, by the achievement of glorious victories and major successes, has contributed to the total elimination of the southern counter-revolutionary forces. In subsequent operations along the Caspian coast 11th Army troops, overcoming stiff resistance, in early 1920 liberated the towns of Petrovsk, Derbent, and finally Baku, facilitating the transfer of the richest oil region into the hands of the workers. Subsequent fighting by 11th Army led to the downfall of the Muslim government of Azerbaijan and the establishment there of the Soviet Republic. In its continuous fighting, the 11th Army, now the Caucasus Army, was engaged in extremely harsh conditions, including in sparsely populated mountainous area. Nevertheless, this valiant army brought decisive victory and a successful end to the campaign by harvest time.

— Order of the Revolutionary Military Council (RVSR), Number 285, October 12, 1921, Battle exploits of the Red Army (1918-1922) Collection of documents. Moscow: Military Publishing, 1957. 240 pages. Page 167.,

At a meeting of the Presidium of the Central Executive Committee of the USSR on 17 August 1923, it was moved and passed to award the Independent Caucasus Army the Order of the Red Banner and rename it the Red Banner Caucasus Army.

Units of the Red Banner Caucasus Army, together with units of the OGPU, were involved in fighting partisans, mainly in Chechnya and Dagestan, in the years 1921-1933.

== Reason for dissolution ==
Amid a perceived increasing threat of armed aggression against the USSR, the old mobilization doctrine and structure of the Red Army was found not optimal for meeting these threats.

On May 17, 1935, the military and administrative system of the Red Army was radically changed. Instead of 8 military districts and 2 separate armies, 13 military districts were created: Moscow, Leningrad, Belarus, Kiev, Kharkov, North Caucasus, Transcaucasia, Central Asia, Volga, Urals, Siberia, Transbaikalia, and Far East.

In almost all of these new districts the composition of the territorial armies was also changed. Replacing the former distinction between "border" and "interior" districts, a new designation of districts as "front" (combat) or "rear" (administrative) was made. It was assumed that the "front" districts would bear the brunt of any fighting, and the "rear" districts would provide reinforcements and logistical support. For each front district there would be two rear districts.

== Composition ==
Six territorial infantry divisions:

- 1st Georgian Division
- 2nd Georgian Division
- 1st Caucasus Infantry Division (formed on June 8, 1922, by combining the 1st and 2nd Caucasus Brigades)
- 3rd Caucasus Infantry Division
- Azerbaijan Infantry Division
- Armenian Infantry Division

Auxiliary units:

- Air Force of the Red Banner Caucasus Army
- Mechanized and armored units of the Red Banner Caucasus Army

== Commanders ==
- Anatoliy Gekker: May–June 1921
- Semyon Pugachov: June 10, 1921 - July 12, 1923
- Alexander Ilyich Yegorov: February 1922 - April 1924
- Semyon Pugachov: April 1924 - February 1925
- August Kork: February 1925 - November 13, 1925
- Mikhail Karlovich Lewandowski: 1925 — 1928
- Konstantin Avksentevsky: October 20, 1928 - 1931
- Ivan Fedko: 1931 - 1932
- Ivan Smolin: 1932
- Mikhail Karlovich Lewandowski: November 1933 - 1935. Became the first commander of the successor organization, the Transcaucasian Military District.

== Sources ==
- 10 years of the Red Banner Of The Caucasus Army Tbilisi: 1931
- Red Banner Transcaucasus: A Short History of the Red Banner Transcaucasian Military District Tbilisi: 1981
- ITU February 1935 edition Col 124
