= Red Sticks (Central Asia) =

Paramilitary organization in Central Asia

- Founder: Soviets
- Type: Paramilitary organisation
- Purpose: To combat the basmachi rebels
- Location: Central Asia

The Red Sticks were paramilitary organisation in Central Asia, formed by the Soviets to combat the basmachi rebels.

The historian Joshua Kunitz quotes a contemporary account: "There are, we are told, sixty thousand Red Sticks in Tadjikistan. Most of them have no firearms, but they carry heavy cudgels, knives, and other weapons when they go out into the hills in search of the Basmachi."
