= Korşirmat =

Uzbek Basmachi leader and Axis collaborator

Shir Muhammad Gazi - Korşirmat
- Шермуҳаммадбек
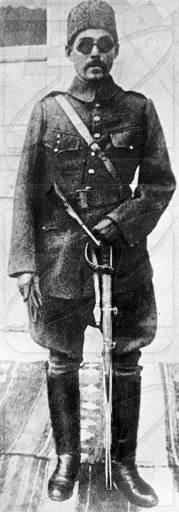
- Born: 1895; Garbaba, Fergana Oblast
- Died: 10 March 1970 (aged 74–75); Adana 36°58'58.7"N 35°21'16.4"E, Turkey

Shir Muhammad-bek Gazi, also known as Mahmud-Bek also known under the nickname Korshirmat (1895, Garbaba, Fergana – March 10, 1970) was a prominent figure of the Basmachi Movement in exile since 1923, the first head of the Turkestan Union during the Great Patriotic War with the support of the Abwehr to restore the insurrectionary movement in Turkestan. He was of Uzbek origin.

== Russian Tsardom Era ==
Shir Muhammad-bek's grandfather, Abdurakhimbek, was a bey of one of the last heads of the Kokand Khanate, Khudoyar-Khan. Abdurakhimbek at some time served as a vizier in Khudoyar's court. After the collapse of the Kokand Khanate, Abdurahimbek began to live in the Margilan village of Kumaryk as a simple farmer. Sher Mukhammed-bek's father Kushakboy Khoja was the amine of Kumaryk. In 1915, he died in Konstantiniyye on his way back from the Hajj.

In his youth, Shir Muhammad-bey led the life of a peasant, was a mirab, which means he divided water along irrigation ditches. In childhood or adolescence, he suffered some kind of eye disease and therefore always wore dark glasses. Hence the widespread nickname Korshirmat, which is translated from Uzbek as Blind Shermat. He studied reading and writing in his native village from the mullah, then graduated from the madrasah in Margilan. According to unconfirmed reports, Shir Mohammed-bek actively participated in the 1916 uprising. Shir Muhhamed's son Davron and his cousin Anvar claim that their father and uncle, respectively, never left Turkestan before Civil War and was never imprisoned in Russian jail. But that claim is disputed by famous Bashkir Turkologist Zaki Validi. The fact that Shir Muhhamed was released from jail soon after the revolution is confirmed in memoirs of Uzbek emigre Abduhamid Cochar from Adana. Relatives describe that in the summer of 1917, during a demonstration in the vicinity of Tashlak, Shir Muhammad-bey stood up for a fellow countryman who was beaten by a policeman and "hit the policeman, knocking him off his horse" and then "beat him to death." Shir Mohammed-bey, his brothers and friends were forced into hiding, after which he, together with his supporters, attacked the prison in Skobelev to arm himself.

== Fergana Uprising ==
Muhammad-bek was the kurbashi of the Uzbek and Turkmen Basmachi in Central Asia, who managed to organize the Basmachi into a political force and achieve major successes in the fight against Soviet power. In 1920 they managed to get official support from Kabul and then acted in northern Afghanistan. In the fall of 1921, Enver Pasha, in alliance with Korshirmat and Dzhunaid Khan, captured a significant part of the Bukhara People's Soviet Republic. To fight them, the commander-in-chief of the Red Army S.S.Kamenev arrived in Turkestan, together with Sergo Ordzhonikidze and Jēkabs Peterss. In april he became the president of Turkestan Provisional Government. Only in June - August 1922, the Bukhara group of forces created under the command of Nikolai Kakurin, then P.A.Pavlov managed to defeat the Basmachi. In May 1920, Shir Muhammad-bey (Kurshirmat), being irreconcilable, firmly secured a leading position among the kurbashi of the Basmak formations in Fergana.

According to analysts from the Cheka, Korshirmat moved forward and became a prominent figure after the surrender of the Red Army on March 6, 1920, under the Ferganian rebel leader Madamin Bek. He managed to unite detachments of up to 1,500 fighters. In February 1921, after a series of setbacks, he left for Eastern Bukhara, but then returned again and was active until the end of 1921, after which he again left for Eastern Bukhara. With the appearance of Enver Pasha and under his influence, Korshirmat returned to the Fergana Valley on January 12, 1922, trying to unite all the Fergana Basmachi around him. According to the Cheka, in September 1922, after a series of major defeats, he left for Afghanistan, where he settled in Khanabad.

== Assassination of Madamin Begkh ==
Kurbashi Madamin-bek, who stopped the struggle and entered into cooperation with the Soviet government, offered Shir Mohammed-bek mediation in going over to the side of the new government. Shir Muhammad-bey played along with Madamin-bek, saying that he was ready for negotiations, and he himself prepared a trap for him. Upon the arrival of Madamin-bek with a detachment in Uch-Kurgan for negotiations, Shir Muhammad-bek arrested Madamin-bek and handed him over to the kurbashi of the Kyrgyz Basmachs Khal Khavja - with whom Madamin-bek had a personal bitter enmity. As a result, Khal Khavja cut off Madamin-Bek's head. Most of the Basmachi formations, once subordinate to Madamin Bek, came under his control. At the end of March 1921 Kurshirmat agreed to negotiate peace with Soviet troops. And in the summer of 1921, he and his closest associate Muat'din-bek conducted these negotiations with the Soviet command. But Korshirmat conducted them very evasively. The demands put forward by him and other leaders of the Basmachi for concessions on the inviolability of Sharia, restoration of the court and justice under the Sharia, private property, inheritance rights, etc. were "satisfied" by the command of the Red Army with appropriate amendments, but the rebels did not agree to lay down their arms. According to Soviet sources, on September 12, he was presented with an ultimatum to surrender his weapons. The Korshirmat again avoided a direct answer. After that, the Red Army launched an offensive against its units in the Margelan area.

In November 1921, Shir Muhammad-bey transferred control of the Fergana Basmachi formations to Kurbashi Muhiuddin, he himself moved to Eastern Bukhara, and from there he moved to Afghanistan.

== Guerrilla Warfare ==
In 1925, the OGPU agent Georges Agabekov met with Korshirmat in Kabul in order to obtain the text of his agreement with the British, having found out that there was no such agreement, Agabekov lost interest in the development of Korshirmat. According to the OGPU, during the Second World War (until 1942), Mahmud-bey was the main intelligence-gathering agent in the republics of Central Asia and northern Afghanistan in the interests of Turkish, Japanese and German intelligence services. Uzbek by nationality, Mahmud-bey was an experienced intelligence officer. Thanks to the ramified intelligence network he created on both sides of the Afghan-Soviet border, Mahmud-bek earned a lot of capital from trading intelligence information from different countries about the current situation in the Central Asian republics. In addition to managing the Basmach formations on the instructions of the German intelligence in September 1941, he expanded the agent and sabotage network he created in Soviet Central Asia, through which he was collecting intelligence information in the region.

On instructions from German intelligence, in the spring of 1942, he formed an anti-Soviet armed organization called "Unyon" in Northern Afghanistan. Its tasks included the return to the Bukhara throne, located in Kabul, the former Emir Seyid Alim Khan.

== Leadership of the "Unyon" ==
The first head of the organization "Unyon" was an anti-Soviet sabotage organization created by the Abwehr in early 1941 in Afghanistan with the aim of collecting intelligence and coordinating the combat activities of the Basmachi forces to attack the territory of the Central Asian republics of the USSR. The attack of Nazi Germany on the Soviet Union, was greeted with enthusiasm by the kurbashi of the Basmachi in Afghan Turkestan.

Kurbashi of the Central Asian emigration, who are in Kabul, declared Hitler their "savior". And those who remained in the north of the country, already in July 1941, began to prepare their troops for renewed attacks on Soviet territory. Young people from wealthy emigrant families, anticipating the imminent arrival of the Germans, began hastily to learn German. The Afghan monarchy behaved with restraint in relation to the numerous formations of Basmachi in the north of the country, since it was sure that in a short time the Soviet Union would be defeated by Germany, and Afghanistan would have a chance to expand its territory, which once belonged to the Emir of Bukhara and Khan of Khiva.

A report from the Middle East Department of the People's Commissariat for Foreign Affairs dated April 4, 1942, noted that a group of Afghan soldiers led by Prince Mohammed Daoud was developing a plan for a military campaign against the USSR. The Kabul Government, according to Soviet intelligence, was confident that the Red Army units stationed on the Soviet-Afghan border would certainly be transferred to the fronts for battles with Wehrmacht formations. And therefore, with the forces of one Afghan division, it will be possible to capture Khiva and Bukhara.

To strengthen relations with the Basmach formations in Northern Afghanistan, King Zahir Shah concluded a secret agreement with the overthrown Emir of Bukhara Seyid Alim Khan who was living in exile in Kabul, which provided for the provision of armed support to Kabul, by the Basmach formations, in the event of clashes with the Red Army. In turn, the kurbashi of the Basmachi tried in every possible way to consolidate agreements with Kabul in the event of a war with the USSR. In August 1941, the kurbashi of the largest Turkmen formation, Kyzyl Ayak, wrote a letter to the Prime Minister Hashim Khan, in which he asked to take Bukhara under his protection and undertook, if necessary, to put under arms up to 40 thousand armed Turkmens. Hashim Khan suggested that all the kurbashi keep their formations in full combat readiness, pointing out that a convenient moment for an attack on the USSR would be presented after the capture of Moscow and Leningrad by the Wehrmacht.

In the summer of 1941, the Japanese and German missions established stable contact with all the major kurbashi of the Central Asian Basmachi. In August 1941, at the request of the German diplomatic mission, Katsubi, a Japanese attorney, met with Seyid Alim Khan, negotiating for possible cooperation against the USSR. The former Emir refused to cooperate, but Seyid Alim Khan's entourage and many Kurbashi Basmachi willingly began to interact with intelligence agents of Germany and Japan, who promised large sums of money for organizing partisan activities in the territory of the Soviet Central Asian republics. In September 1941, the Abwehr instructed the influential Uzbek Kurbashi Mahmud-bek among the Basmachis to create an espionage and sabotage network on both sides of the Soviet-Afghan border. This was the beginning of the cooperation of Mahmud-bey as a resident of the Abwehr among the Uzbek and Turkmen formations of the Basmachi in Afghanistan.

== Family ==
- First wife (from 1916) - daughter of Mingbashi Muzaffarbek.
- Second wife (from 1926) - Zulfiniso (? -1972) originally from Andijan, buried in Adana
  - Son - Davronbek, later Davron Beck (born 1927), lives in the USA
  - Son - Jahongirbek, died in childhood, buried in Kabul
  - Daughter - Saodathon, lives in Adana (Turkey).
  - Daughter - Hosiyathon, died in childhood, buried in Kabul
- Brother - Tashmukhammadbek, was appointed Ambassador of Kurshirmat in Afghanistan
- Brother - Ruzmukhammadbek
- Brother - Shermukhammadbek
- Brother - Tozhmukhammadbek
- Brother - Nurmukhammadbek (1899? —10 January 1984, Adana)
- Sister - Tufahon
- Sister - Savrinisokhon
