= 10th Terek-Dagestan Army =

The 10th Terek-Dagestan Army was a field army of the Red Army during the Russian Civil War which was formed on the basis of the Terek-Dagestan group of forces between March 7 and May 29, 1921. The troops became then part of the North Caucasus Military District.

== History ==
The army was formed to suppress the insurrection under the leadership of Najmuddin of Gotzo, a mufti who was a leader of anti-Soviet resistance in the North Caucasus during the Russian Civil War.

== Commanders ==
- Mikhail Levandovsky (April 7 - April 18, 1921)
- I.F. Sharskov (acting, April 18-26, 1921)
- V.N. Chernyshov (April 26 - May 11, 1921)
- Georgy Armaderov (May 11-29, 1921)
