= 407th Rifle Division =

407th Rifle Division; 94th Separate Rifle Brigade
- Active: 1943–1946
- Country: Soviet Union
- Branch: Red Army
- Type: Infantry
- Size: 5,139 (September 1945)
- Part of: 13th Rifle Corps
- Garrison/HQ: Sukhumi

The 407th Rifle Division (Russian: 407-я стрелковая дивизия) was an infantry division of the Red Army that was briefly active shortly after World War II, from August 1945 to early 1946. The division, the first Red Army rifle division created after the war in Europe, was formed from the second formation of the 94th Separate Rifle Brigade (94-я отдельная стрелковая бригада), which had been formed in early 1943 for garrison duty at the port city of Sukhumi in Georgia.

== History ==
Unit locations, 1943–1945

The 94th Separate Rifle Brigade (Second formation) was formed as part of the 13th Rifle Corps of the Transcaucasian Front between 24 February and 15 April 1943 at Sukhumi, from two separate mountain rifle detachments, and was brought up to strength with conscripts of the 1926 draft class. It included three rifle battalions and submachine gun, 107 mm mortar, anti-tank gun, and artillery battalions as well as smaller support units. Colonel Shalva Melkadze, the Georgian deputy commander of the nearby 406th Rifle Division, became commander on 5 March. The brigade was responsible for the defense of the Black Sea coast in the vicinity of Sukhumi from Primorskoye to the mouth of the Rion River, with elements based at Sukhumi, Novy Afon, Ochamchire, and Beslakhuba. In 1943, the brigade sent five march companies to provide replacements for units engaged in combat. By September of that year, the brigade was almost at full strength, though only 32% of its personnel had combat experience in the war. It was ethnically mixed, with 24% Russians, 21% Azerbaijanis, 20% Georgians, and 16.8% Armenians. Melkadze was transferred to serve as deputy commander of the neighbouring 392nd Rifle Division in February 1944, and was succeeded by Lieutenant Colonel Georgy Shchadin, the former chief of staff of a tank brigade, who was promoted to colonel on 3 February 1945.

The 407th was ordered formed from the 94th Brigade on 21 August 1945, the first rifle division formed after the war in Europe. The 407th included the 699th, 701st, and 704th Rifle Regiments, and the 607th Divisional Artillery Brigade with the 2333rd Gun Artillery Regiment, the 2334th Howitzer Artillery Regiment, and the 496th Mortar Regiment, in addition to smaller support units. Separate artillery battalions were the 876th Self-Propelled, the 873rd Anti-Tank Battalion, and the 1124th Anti-Aircraft. Shchadin continued in command of the division until September, when he became deputy commander after Major General Aleksandr Pykhtin, a combat experienced division commander, arrived to take command.

The division was headquartered at Sukhumi and most of its units were also stationed there, excepting the 701st Regiment at Novy Afon on the coast to the northwest, the 496th Mortar Regiment at Ochamchire on the coast to the southeast, and the 699th Rifle Regiment and the 856th Separate Self-Propelled Artillery Battalion with SU-76 self-propelled guns at Beslakhuba inland to the northeast of Ochamchire. By late September, it had 5,139 officers and men out of an authorized peacetime strength of 5,500.

It was disbanded by mid-1946 along with the other division of the corps, the 392nd. Two divisions were soon transferred to the corps to replace the 392nd and 407th. The 407th may have been disbanded as early as January and February, when both Shchadin and Pykhtin were reassigned.
