= Peasant Army of Fergana =

Anti-bolshevist peasant armed formation

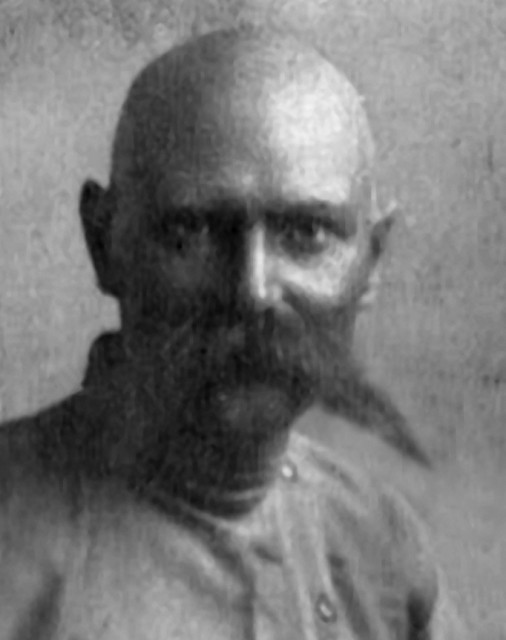
Colonel Konstantin Ivanovich Monstrov, leader of the Fergana Peasant Army

The Fergana Peasant Army (Russian: Крестьянская армия Ферганы), also known as the Monstrov Army, was an Anti-Bolshevist peasant armed formation, created in the Fergana Valley in Central Asia, during the Russian Civil War.

== History ==
The army was established in the spring of 1919. It numbered approximately 20,000 men. The center of operations was located in Jalal-Abad. It consisted of Russian peasants living in the Fergana Valley who decided to defend themselves against attacks by Muslim Basmachi troops. These conservative peasants were also hostile towards the Bolsheviks, who had only weak forces in the area, which resulted in their virtual withdrawal from the valley in early 1919.

The army staff was headed by Colonel Konstantin Monstrov, a landowner and former tsarist officer. The formation was divided into ten regiments, the first four of which were intended for main warfare, the next four for village protection, and the last two were reserves (composed of those unfit for military service and older people). The army had the status of non-partisan and independent.

Initially, an agreement was concluded on cooperation with the Bolsheviks against the Basmachi, but at the end of August 1919 an agreement was reached with the local leader of the Basmachi, Madamin Bey. This was caused by the growing strength of the Bolsheviks, now threatening both previously hostile sides. Madamin-Bey pledged to put an end to the attacks of his troops on Fergana villages. In response, the Bolshevik command ordered its troops to disarm the Fergana Peasant Army. Several units were sent to the Jalal-Abad area to destroy the main peasant forces with one concentric attack. However, they failed. The second Bolshevik attack ended the same way.

As a reaction, troops of the Fergana Peasant Army together with Basmachi warriors began offensive operations. Their first success was the capture of the city of Osh and then the repulse of the Bolshevik counterattack. In September 1919, the main forces were directed to Andijan. However, the fighting for the city lasted longer than expected. At this time, the Bolsheviks brought in reinforcements in the form of the Kazan regiment, which arrived on 22 September. The troops of the Fergana Peasant Army near Andijan were defeated, and the surviving peasants fled to their home villages.

Bolshevik troops went on the counteroffensive. They recaptured Osh without a fight, as the peasant garrison simply fled. In order to save the situation, Colonel Monstrow initially tried to obtain help from some European country. After the failure, he managed to establish the Fergana Provisional Representative Office on 22 October 1919, which was headed - apart from him - by Madamin-Bey as the representative of the Basmachi's and General Mukhanov as the representative of the White Movement. They intended to unite all local anti-Bolshevik forces.

However, the leadership of the Provisional Office was taken over by Madamin-Bey, who decided to end his alliance with the Fergana Peasant Army. In one of the villages, his troops captured Colonel Monstrow, but he managed to escape.
On 17 January 1920, Monstrow arrived in Jalal-Abad, where he handed himself into the hands of the Bolsheviks. Following him, the last existing units of the Fergana Peasant Army also surrendered to the Bolsheviks.

== Sources ==
History of the Peasant Army of Fergana (in Russian)
