= Gaia Gai =

Soviet military commander (1887–1937)

Hayk Bzhishkian
- Armenian: Հայկ Բժշկական
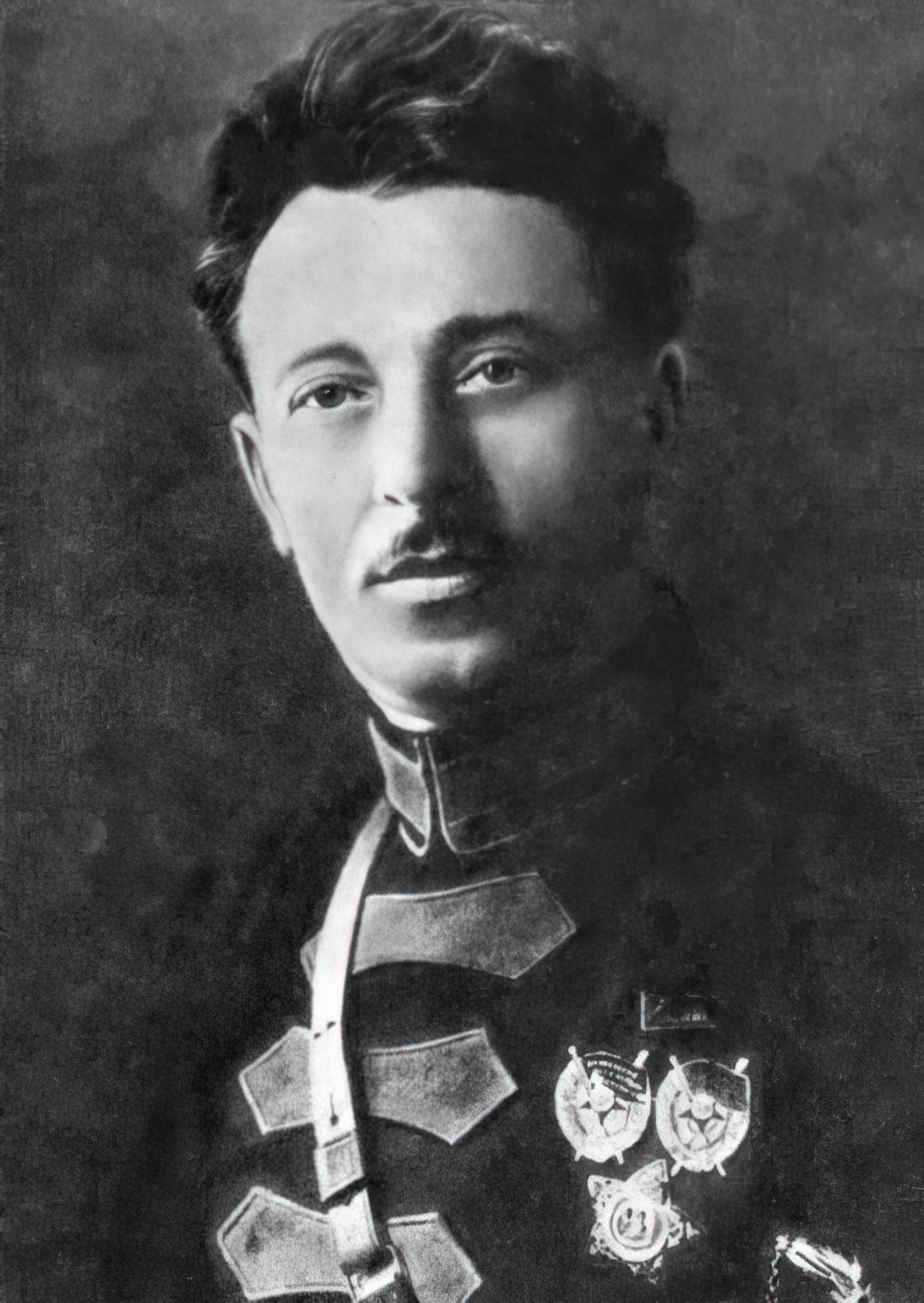
- Bzhishkian in 1920
- Born: Hayk Bzhishkian; 6 February 1887; Tabriz, Sublime State of Persia
- Died: 11 December 1937 (aged 50); Moscow, Russian SFSR, Soviet Union
- Military career
- Allegiance: Russia (1914–1917); Russian SFSR (1917–1922); Soviet Union (1922–1935)
- Branch: Imperial Russian Army; Red Army
- Service years: 1914–1935
- Rank: Comcor
- Nicknames: Guy, Gai
- Commands: 24th Rifle Division; 1st Army; 42nd Rifle Division; 1st Caucasus Cavalry Division; 2nd Cavalry Corps; 3rd Cavalry Corps
- Conflicts: World War I; Russian Civil War; Polish–Soviet War
- Awards: see below

Hayk Bzhishkian (Armenian: Հայկ Բժշկյան, Russian: Гайк Бжишкян, also known as Guy Dmitrievich Guy, Gai Dmitrievich Gai (Гай Дмитриевич Гай), Gaya Gai (Гая Гай), 18 February [O.S. 6 February] 1887 – 11 December 1937), was a Soviet military commander of Persian-Armenian origin who fought in the Russian Civil War and Polish–Soviet War.

== Early life ==
Gai was born Hayk Bzhishkian in Tabriz, Iran, to a family of teachers. His mother was Persian and his father was an Armenian socialist (a member of the Armenian Social Democrat Hnchakian Party) who had taken refuge from the tsarist authorities in Persia during the 1880s. He returned to Russia in his teens and was an activist and journalist in Tiflis, where he studied at the Armenian Theological Seminary. He joined the Russian Social Democratic Labor Party in 1904 and spent five years in jail for revolutionary activities before he was drafted in 1914.

== World War I ==
Because of his background, Gai was assigned to the Russo-Ottoman Caucasus campaign, where his repeated acts of bravery under fire earned him the rank of stabs-kapitan, the Cross of St. George (3rd and 4th class), and the Order of St. Anna, all awarded by General Nikolai Yudenich. Captured by the Ottomans, he escaped and returned to Russia badly wounded on the eve of the February Revolution. During World War I, Bzhishkian rose to the rank of captain. Gai, as he came to be known, became a Bolshevik before the October Revolution.

== 1917–1921 ==
He became a military commander in 1918, when he fought against the Czechoslovak Legion ("White Czechs") and the Orenburg Cossacks of ataman Alexander Dutov.

During the Polish–Soviet War of 1920, he helped Mikhail Tukhachevsky drive the Poles back to Warsaw. Gai was appointed commander of the 3rd Cavalry Corps ("Kavkor"), attached to the 4th Army, and consisting of the 10th Division (N. D. Tomin) and the 15th (Kuban) Division (V. I. Matuzenko), with the 164th Rifle Brigade in support. In Tukhachevsky's plan, the role assigned to the Kavkor was "of the utmost importance". It was to operate on the extreme right wing of the Soviet advance and turn the flank of the Polish defence lines, thus allowing them to be rolled up by the attacking armies. The Kavkor advanced rapidly, taking Vilnius on July 14, Grodno (where the Red cavalry encountered tanks for the first time) on July 22, reaching the Vistula in the second week of August, and cutting the crucial Warsaw–Gdańsk railway.

However, the Polish counter-attack resulted in the encirclement of the 4th Army. Gai's Kavkor attempted to break out. After several engagements, it was finally pinned against the German (East Prussian) border by the pursuing Poles. The Kavkor crossed the border on August 26, and Gai was interned by the Germans in the Salzwedel camp near Berlin.

He was twice awarded with the Order of the Red Banner; in 1919 for battles in the Volga Region of 1918 and in 1920 for the Polish campaign.

== 1921–1935 ==
Gai was the People's Commissar of the Army and Navy of the Armenian SSR and later a military history lecturer and researcher in 1922. From 1924 to 1925, he was the chief of the military garrison in Minsk. In 1926, he continued his studies at the Military Academy of the General Staff. Upon graduation in 1927, Bzhishkian managed the Frunze department. He was a professor and the Head of the Department of War History and Military Art in the Zhukovsky Air Force Engineering Academy from 1933 to 1935.

== Arrest and death ==
In June 1935, he was dismissed from all his posts and the army and was also expelled from the Communist Party. On 3 July 1935, he was arrested and accused of "creating a military-fascist organization in the Red Army" by the Military Collegium of the Supreme Court of the USSR. He was also accused of having a private conversation with a non-party member while drunk and stating, "it is necessary to remove Stalin". On 15 October 1935, Gai was sentenced by the Special Council of the NKVD on charges of involvement in a counter-revolutionary group to 5 years in detention camps. While being sent to the Yaroslavl prison on 22 October 1935, he escaped, but after a few days he was arrested by the NKVD.

He spent two years in detention. On 11 December 1937, during the Great Purge, Gai was shot. His books were declared politically harmful and banned. After Stalin's death, he was rehabilitated on 21 January 1956 and restored to the party posthumously.

== Memory ==
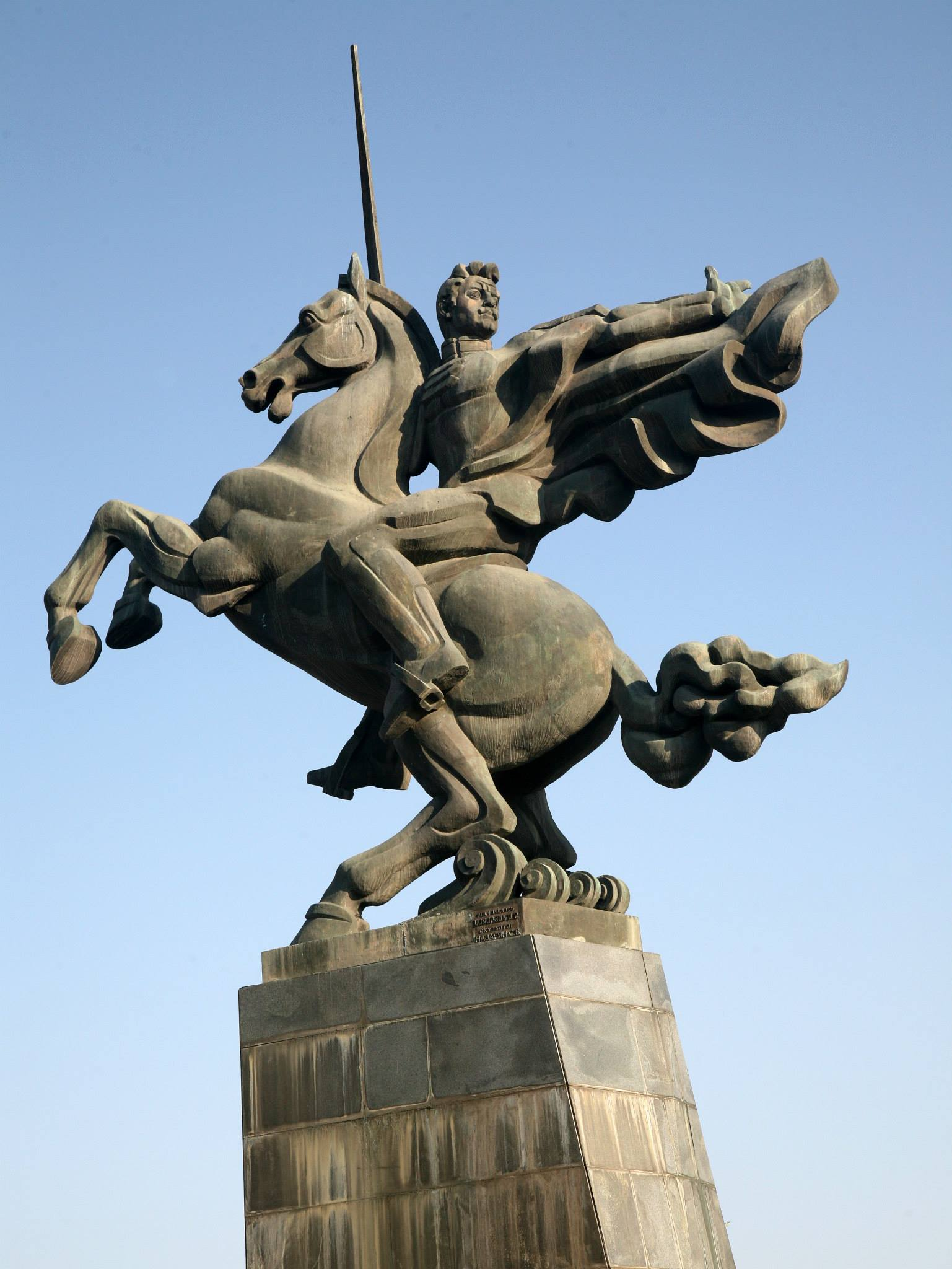
Bzhishkian's monument in Yerevan

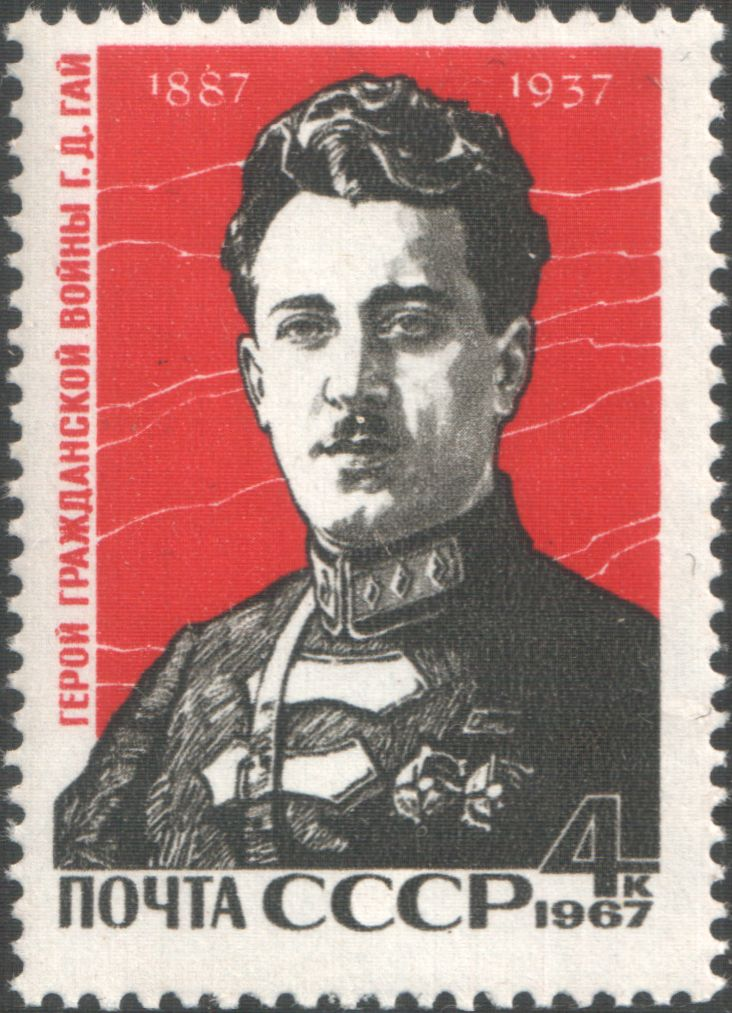
Postage stamp USSR, 1967

The village of Gai in Armenia was renamed in his honor. A USSR postage stamp with Gai's portrait was made in 1967. The passenger river motor ship (riverboat) Komdiv Gai (Комдив Гай, 1963) bears his name. There are streets named after him in the cities of Yerevan, Grodno, Minsk, Samara, Orenburg, Tolyatti, and Stary Oskol.

== Honors and awards ==
Russian Empire

Cross of St. George, 3rd class.
Cross of St. George, 4th class.
Order of St. Anna

Soviet Union

Order of the Red Banner, two times (1918, 1920)

Bzhishkian was also made an honorary citizen of Minsk.

== Commands ==
Gai commanded some regiments, divisions and higher military formations:

- July–November 1918: 1st Samara Infantry Division, transformed into 24th Rifle Division that took over Simbirsk (Ulyanovsk) and was later known as "Samara-Ulyanovsk Iron Division".
- January–May, 1919: 1st Army (RSFSR)
- August–September 1919: 42nd Rifle Division
- September 1919–March 1920: 1st Caucasus Cavalry Division
- During the Polish-Soviet War he commanded the 2nd Cavalry Corps and (from June or July) 3rd Cavalry Corps, also known as "Kavkor", on the right flank of the Western Front. In August 1920 he covered the retreat of the 4th Army and was interned in East Prussia.
- 1923—1924: 7th Cavalry Division (Georgy Zhukov served under his command and highly praised him later in his memoirs).

== Name ==
Hayk's first name is sometimes given as Gaia, Гая, or Gai, as well as Ghaia or Ghai; the patronymic is sometimes spelt as "Dimitrievich" or "Dimitriyevich" or "Dmitriyevich"; the last name also spelt as Bzhishkiants (Бжишкянц); in Polish sources related to Polish-Soviet War he is referred to as either Gaj Brzyszkian, Gaj Dimitrijewicz Gaj or Gaj-Chan (Khan), or Gay-Khan (English spelling). His first name, Гайк, is a Russian transliteration of "Haik", which was further corrupted in various Latinizations.

== Works ==
- Первый удар по Колчаку (Pervy udar po Kolchaku, "The First Shot on Kolchak"). Leningrad, 1926.
- На Варшаву! Действия 3 конного корпуса на Западном фронте (Na Varshavu! Deystviya 3 konnogo korpusa na Zapadnom fronte, "To Warsaw! Activities of the 3rd Cavalry Corps on the Western Front"). Moscow, Leningrad, 1928.
- В боях за Симбирск (V boyakh za Simbirsk, "In the Battle for Simbirsk"). Ulyanovsk, 1928.
