= 392nd Division =

392nd Division may refer to:

- 392nd (Croatian) Infantry Division, Wehrmacht, Germany
- 392nd Rifle Division, Soviet Union

== See also ==
- List of military divisions by number
