= Red Army intervention in Afghanistan (1930) =

USSR military action Union against Afghan rebels

- Part of the Basmachi movement
Date	1–30 June 1930
Location	Badakhshan Province, Kingdom of Afghanistan
Result	Soviet victory; The defeat of the Basmachi bases in northern Afghanistan

Belligerents
Soviet Union: Red Army; Supported by: Kingdom of Afghanistan	Basmachi

Commanders and leaders
Yakov Melkumov	Ibrahim Bek; Utan Bek

Casualties and losses
3 casualties: 1 drowned at the crossing (Red Army); 2 wounded (Red Army and Komvzvoda)	839 soldiers killed Large property losses

The Red Army intervention in Afghanistan in 1930 or the Second Soviet Intervention in Afghanistan of 1930 was a special operation of the Central Asian Military District command to destroy the Basmachi economic bases and exterminate their manpower in Afghanistan. The operation was carried out by parts of the combined cavalry brigade under the command of the brigade commander Yakov Melkumov.

== Prelude ==
In 1930, the Central Asian Military District command developed a plan to attack the Basmachi bases and destroy their manpower in northern Afghanistan, where active fighters against the Soviet government emigrated from Turkestan in the 1920s and repeatedly violated the Soviet-Afghan border. In addition, as early as the end of 1929, Soviet intelligence received reliable information from the recently defeated Emir of Afghanistan Habibullāh Kalakāni (Bacha-ye Saqao) about the planned tearing away of northern Afghanistan and the formation of a separate state on its territory, headed by Ibrahim Bek. At a meeting of elders in Kunduz in March 1930, the Prime Minister of Afghanistan, Mohammad Hashim Khan, on behalf of the King of Afghanistan, Mohammed Nadir Shah, who had taken power from Habibullah, again demanded that Ibrahim Bek lay down his arms. However, the latter stated:

My weapon is not directed against Afghanistan. It is ours, we got it in battle.

These circumstances to a great extent bothered the Afghan government, and it agreed to force intervention by the USSR in their country.

== Campaign ==
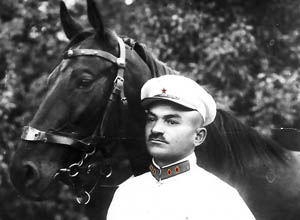
Brigade commander Yakov Melkumov.

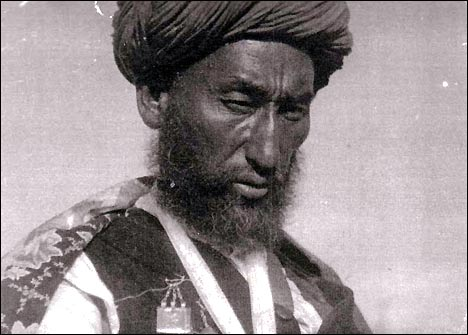
Kurbashi Ibrahim Bek.

Before crossing the border at the Aivaj post with the soldiers of the Red Army, explanatory work was carried out on the need for their invasion of the territory of a neighboring state. The purpose of the campaign was explained, and the possibility of causing any damage to the indigenous population of Afghanistan was strictly excluded. The results of the operation were to be “our gift” to the 16th Party Congress.

At the end of June 1930, the combined cavalry brigade of the Red Army under the command of the brigade commander Yakov Melkumov (Hakob Melkumyan, known in the Basmachi environment as Yakub Tura), crossed the Amu Darya, entering Afghanistan. Not meeting on its way opposition from the local authorities and the regular Afghan army, the Soviet detachment advanced 50–70 km inland. The local population, which was clearly dissatisfied with the emigrants (Basmachis and their families), who, in their opinion, occupied the “best lands”, was friendly towards the Red Army units. Local residents often acted as guides. Unit commanders, in turn, as noted in the report: "They strictly controlled that during the operation the fighters did not accidentally“ touch ”the farms and property of the indigenous people, and did not affect their national and religious feelings". Representatives of the local administration assisted the Soviet detachment when crossing the Khanabad River, as well as in the acquisition of supplies and fodder. Payment for receiving the latter was carried out in a currency convenient for the local population.

Upon learning of the Red Army's invasion of Afghanistan, Ibrahim Bek initially wanted to fight, but after specifying the enemy’s strength, he hastily left for the mountains, while informing the naibul-hukuma (governor-general) of the Qataghan-Badakhshan Province, Mir-Muhammed-Safar Khan, to attack of the Red Army. Safar Khan, in turn, sent a letter to the Soviet commanders on 23 June, reproaching them "for a sudden border crossing" and urging them to return "to their territory", but this did not impede the further operation of the latter. The next day, Ibrahim Bek received an order from Safar Khan to "join the battle with the Reds". However, seeing that the local authorities "do not interfere with the Russians", the Lokai at the assembled council decided that the Afghans were deliberately trying to push them against the Red Army. Another prominent kurbashi was Utan Bek, who was aware of his agents on the border as well as Ibrahim Bek went to the mountains. As a result of this, units of the Red Army, as noted in the report: "did not have to meet organized resistance and they eliminated individual gangs of 30–40 dzhigits, individual basmachi and their accomplices".

During the punitive raid, Ak-Tepe (White Hill) and Ali-Abad villages in Kunduz Province were burned and destroyed, except for that part of the village where the native Afghans lived. Also, during the raid for 35 km, all villages and yurts in the river valley were destroyed. Up to 17,000 cartridges were blown up, up to 40 rifles were seized, emigrants' grain stocks were burned, cattle were destroyed and partially stolen. The Soviet detachment took 200 camels, 80 horses and 400 rams with them. The local Afghan population did not leave their yurts and remained untouched. The total losses of the Basmachis and their accomplices amounted to 839 people killed, including the head of the religious sect Pir-Ishan and the ideological inspirers of the Basmachi by the kurbashi Ishan-Palvan and Domullo-Donahan. The losses of the Soviet side amounted to one drowned at the crossing and two wounded.

== See also ==
- Afghan Civil War (1928–1929)
  - Red Army intervention in Afghanistan (1929)
- Soviet–Afghan War
