= Ivan Fedko =

Soviet military officer

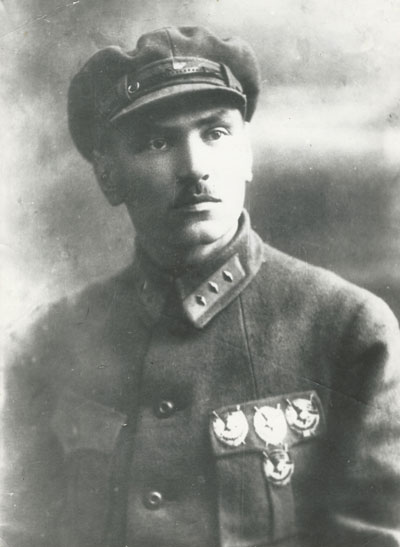
- Fedko, c. 1935-1937
- Born: July 6, 1897; Khmelev, Poltava Governorate, Russian Empire (now Khmeliv, Ukraine)
- Died: February 26, 1939 (aged 41) Soviet Union
- Allegiance: Russian Empire (1916–1917); Soviet Union (1918–1938)
- Branch: Imperial Russian Army; Soviet Red Army
- Rank: Komandarm 1st rank
- Commands: 13th Rifle Corps; Red Banner Caucasus Army; Volga Military District; Maritime Group of Forces; Kiev Military District
- Conflicts: World War I; Russian Civil War; Battle of Kiev
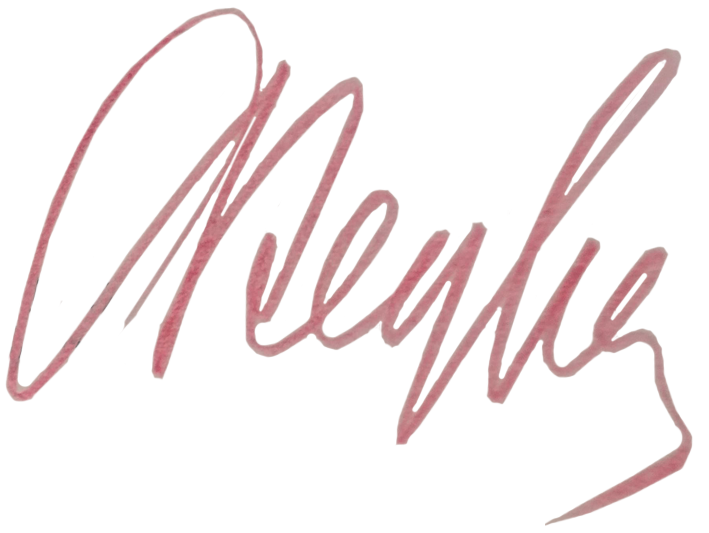
- Signature

Ivan Fyodorovich Fedko (Russian: Ива́н Фёдорович Федько́; Ukrainian: Іван Федорович Федько; July 6, 1897 – February 26, 1939) was a Soviet Komandarm 1st rank and army commander. He was born in what is now the Left-bank Ukraine. He fought in the Imperial Russian Army during World War I before joining the Bolsheviks. During the Russian Civil War, he fought against the White movement army of Abram Dragomirov in Kiev. He was a 4-time recipient of the Order of the Red Banner (1919, twice in 1921, 1924) and the Order of Lenin. He was made a Komandarm 2nd rank in 1935 and a Komandarm 1st rank on February 20, 1938. In 1938, he was awarded the Jubilee Medal "XX Years of the Workers' and Peasants' Red Army".

Fedko joined the Bolsheviks in 1917. He was also a member of the Central Executive Committee of the USSR, deputy of the Supreme Soviet of the USSR of the first convocation, member of the Military Council under the People's Commissar of Defense of the USSR.

During the Great Purge, he was arrested on July 7, 1938, charged with participating in a "fascist military conspiracy in the Red Army", and executed the following year. After the death of Joseph Stalin, he was rehabilitated in 1956.

== Early years ==
Ivan Fyodorovich Fedko was born in the village of Khmeliv, Romensky Uyezd, Poltava Governorate, Russian Empire (now the Romensky district of the Sumy Oblast of Ukraine) into a Ukrainian peasant family. He was baptized in the Eastern Orthodox faith, but later became an atheist.

In the autumn of 1904, the Fedko family, with their 7-year-old son Ivan, moved to Bessarabia. The family often changed their place of residence - they lived in Bălți, in Soroca, in Comrat, where Ivan graduated from elementary school, then they lived in Chișinău, and from 1915 in Bendery. In Chișinău, Fedko, after studying for four years at the Alexander Vocational School (on Izmailovskaya Street), graduated with honors in May 1915, then went to work as a cabinetmaker at a local furniture factory.

== Army service ==
In the autumn of 1915, Fedko entered the Russian Imperial Army. He enlisted in the local infantry regiment in Bendery, then was transferred to the 42nd Infantry Reserve Regiment in Tiraspol, from there, in April 1916, he was sent to Oranienbaum. In July 1916, he was promoted to the rank of corporal.

He was then sent to the Southwestern Front, where he fought as a machine gunner as part of the 420th Infantry Serdobsky Regiment of the 105th Infantry Division of the 32nd Army Corps of the 8th Army. While fighting in the summer offensive of 1916, he was wounded, but remained in the ranks, in command of a squad.

After one year of service in the lower ranks, in February 1917, Fedko was sent to study at the 4th Kyiv school for the training of infantry ensigns. After successfully completing a four-month school course, on June 24, 1917, he was promoted to the rank of ensign. He later served in the Ukrainized battalion of the 35th Reserve Infantry Regiment in Feodosia, as a junior company officer, commanding a platoon.

== Civil War and subsequent career ==
In June 1917, he joined the Bolshevik Party. From August to November 1917, he was an elected battalion commander of the 35th Reserve Infantry Regiment. At the same time, he organized a revolutionary committee in Feodosia and, in January 1918, a detachment of the Red Guard, later deployed to the 1st Black Sea Revolutionary Regiment. An active participant in the establishment of Soviet power in Feodosia and in the Crimea, he was involved in the "red" terror in Feodosia in 1918. On March 1, 1918, Fedko was demobilized from the "old" Russian (former imperial) army.

In March 1918, the Fedko regiment (then the 1st Black Sea detachment) raided Northern Tavria and the Kherson region and on March 20–23, 1918 took part in the Nikolaev uprising against the Austro-German interventionists who entered the city. After the defeat of the uprising, the Fedko regiment fought the interventionists in Northern Tavria and in the Crimea. In April 1918, in the area of the Chongar bridge and near Dzhankoi, as part of the armed forces of the Soviet Socialist Republic of Taurida, he defended the Crimea from the armed formations of the Ukrainian People's Republic advancing at the forefront of the interventionists.

Later, Fedko fought in the North Caucasus. From May to July 1918, he commanded the third and first columns of the troops of the Kuban-Black Sea Soviet Republic, especially distinguishing himself during the defense of Tikhoretsk from the troops of General Anton Denikin, where he received seven wounds. After recovering, he commanded the first column of the Belorechensky combat area. From October 27 to November 1918, he served as the appointed Acting Commander-in-Chief of the Revolutionary Forces of the North Caucasus. From November 1918 to February 1919, he was assistant commander of the 11th Army of the Red Army.

In 1919, Fedko became a member of the Revolutionary Military Council of the Crimean Soviet Socialist Republic and deputy commander of the Crimean Army of the 14th Army of the Red Army until July 21, 1919, when it was transformed into the Crimean Rifle Division. In August 1919, he was almost shot by anarchist sailors, only to be saved by the former anarchist Alexei Mokrousov. For military distinction, the division was awarded the Honorary Revolutionary Red Banner, and division commander Fedko was awarded the Order of the Red Banner of the RSFSR.

In 1920, he commanded troops of the 13th Army and the 46th Infantry Division. He was awarded a second Order of the Red Banner of the RSFSR for his leadership of the division and courage shown in the battles with the white army of Baron Wrangel in Northern Tavria. In November 1920 - April 1921 in Feodosia, a special department of the 46th rifle division of the Red Army, commanded by Fedko, participated in the mass executions of captured White Guards.

In 1921, Fedko participated in the suppression of the anti-Soviet uprising in Kronstadt, commanding the 187th cadet rifle brigade, for which he was awarded the third Order of the Red Banner of the RSFSR. After that, in May 1921, Fedko participated in the suppression of a peasant uprising in the Tambov province, being appointed commander of the 1st combat sector. He was awarded the fourth Order of the Red Banner of the RSFSR For distinction in suppressing the Tambov uprising in 1924.

== Soviet career ==
In 1922, he became commander of the 18th Yaroslavl Rifle Division. In April 1924, he was transferred to commander of the 13th Rifle Corps, which participated in suppressing the Basmachi movement in Central Asia. From November 1925, Fedko was the commander of the 2nd Rifle Corps.

In February 1927, he was appointed Chief of Staff of the North Caucasian Military District, then became Assistant Commander of the Leningrad Military District in October 1928. In February 1931 he became Commander of the Caucasian Red Banner Army then in March 1932 the Commander of the Volga Military District.

On October 17, 1933, he was appointed assistant commander of the Special Red Banner Far Eastern Army ("OKVDA") under Vasily Blyukher. On June 20, 1934, he replaced Vitovt Putna as commander of the Primorsky Group of the OKVDA.

From May 1937 to January 1938, he was Commander of the Kyiv Military District. From January 1938 he was the First Deputy People's Commissar of Defense of the USSR. At the same time, since March 1938, he was a member of the Main Military Council of the Red Army.

In 1937, he was elected a deputy of the Supreme Soviet of the USSR of the 1st convocation, and at its 1st session in January 1938 - a member of the Presidium of the Supreme Soviet of the USSR. In February 1938 he was awarded the Order of Lenin and the jubilee medal "20 Years of the Red Army".

== Arrest and execution ==
Investigators of the Special Department of the Main Directorate of State Security of the NKVD of the USSR began to collect accusations against Fedko as early as 1937. In April 1938, in the presence of Joseph Stalin, Fedko confronted the arrested Innokenty Khalepsky, Semyon Uritsky and Ivan Belov and categorically denied all the accusations against him. On May 1, 1938, Fedko sent a letter to Stalin in which he continued to insist on his innocence. When he received no answer, he sent another similar letter on June 30.

Fedko was arrested on July 7, 1938. He was immediately subjected to torture and on July 10 "confessed" that, in 1932, he was recruited to join a "military fascist conspiracy" by Ivan Belov. In his statement after the arrest, Fedko wrote about his interrogator N. N. Fedorov: "The investigator told me: I don’t know whether you are an enemy or not, but you will give evidence." As a result of this investigation, Fedko denounced Kirill Meretskov, A. I. Zhiltsov, and several other people. Fedorov himself was arrested in the autumn of 1938, convicted and shot in February 1940 as an accomplice of Nikolai Yezhov and Mikhail Frinovsky and declared unrehabilitated in 2013.

Fedko was included in the list prepared by Lavrentiy Beria and Andrey Vyshinsky dated February 15, 1939 slated for execution. On February 26, 1939, he was sentenced to death by the verdict of the Military Collegium of the Supreme Court of the USSR and shot on the same day. The burial place is the "grave of unclaimed ashes" No. 1 of the crematorium of the Donskoy cemetery.

== Legacy ==
After the death of Stalin, he was rehabilitated posthumously by the decision of the Military Collegium of the Supreme Court of the USSR of May 26, 1956. Monuments to Fedko were erected in Khmeliv (1964), Sumy (1967), and Romny (1977) (now dismantled). Streets in Yevpatoria, Feodosia, Donetsk and Sevastopol are named after him. A tanker produced by JSC "Kherson Shipbuilding Plant" was named "Comandarm Fedko".

In 2015, after the adoption of the Law of Ukraine "On the Condemnation of the Communist and National Socialist (Nazi) Totalitarian Regimes in Ukraine and the Prohibition of Propaganda of Their Symbolism", the Ukrainian Institute of National Remembrance included the name of Ivan Fedko in the list of persons whose activities are subject to the laws on decommunization.

== Honours and awards ==
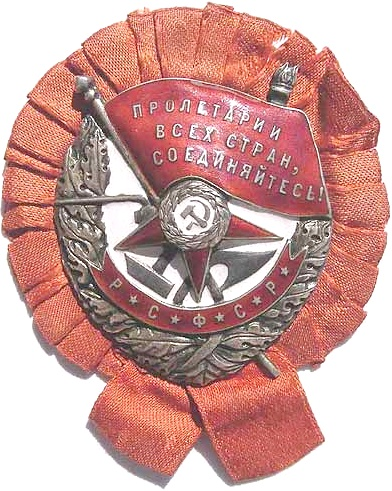
Order of Lenin
Four Orders of the Red Banner
Jubilee Medal "XX Years of the Workers' and Peasants' Red Army"
Order of the Red Banner of Labor of Tajikistan

Preceded by	Commander of the 13th Rifle Corps; April 1924-November 1925	Succeeded by
Preceded by Konstantin Avksentevsky	Commander of the Red Banner Caucasus Army; 1931–1932	Succeeded by Ivan Smolin
Preceded by Boris Shaposhnikov	Commander of the Volga Military District; 1932–1933	Succeeded by Pavel Dybenko
Preceded by Vitovt Putna	Commander of the Maritime Group of Forces; July 1934 – May 1937	Succeeded by Mikhail Lewandowski
Preceded by Iona Yakir	Commander of the Kiev Military District; 1937–1938	Succeeded by Semyon Timoshenko
