= Ivan Smolin =

Soviet army commander

Ivan Ivanovich Smolin
- Born: 5 July 1895; Ryazan Governorate, Russian Empire
- Died: 20 September 1937 (aged 42) Moscow, Soviet Union
- Allegiance: Russian Empire (1914–1917); Soviet Russia (1918–1922); Soviet Union (1922–1937)
- Branch: Imperial Russian Army; Soviet Red Army
- Commands: 6th Rifle Division; Red Banner Caucasus Army
- Conflicts: World War I Russian Civil War
- Other work: CPSU (1919–1937)

Ivan Ivanovich Smolin (Russian: Иван Иванович Смолин; 5 July 1895 – 20 September 1937) was a Soviet army commander. He fought in the Imperial Russian Army in World War I and in the Soviet Red Army in the Russian Civil War. He was a recipient of the Order of the Red Banner (1922). During the Great Purge, he was arrested on 14 May 1937 and later executed. After the death of Joseph Stalin, he was rehabilitated in 1955.

== Early life, World War I, and Russian Civil War ==
Smol was born in 1891 in the village of Khodynino, Ryazan Governorate, the son of an army officer. He graduated from a realschule and in 1914 was conscripted into the Imperial Russian Army during World War I. After graduating from an accelerated course at the Vladimir Military School later that year, Smolin became a praporshchik in the infantry, serving with the 204th Infantry Regiment. After the February Revolution in 1917 he was elected to the regimental committee. Smolin left the Imperial Army with the rank of podporuchik.

He joined the Red Army in 1918, fighting in the Russian Civil War on the Southern and Western Fronts. That year, he served successively as instructor for the formation of Red Guard detachments, as military commander of Ostrogozhsky Uyezd, as a company commander, and as chief of staff and commander of the Consolidated Group of Forces of the 8th Army. From April 1919, Smolin, who joined the Communist Party in 1919, commanded the 2nd Brigade of the 42nd Rifle Division. During the offensive of the Armed Forces of South Russia on the Volchansk-Valuyki between August and September 1919, Smolin and brigade chief of staff Nikolay Yefimov were reported to have "personally inspired the brigade's troops" and fought against superior White forces in battles near Novy Oskol and southeast of Belgorod, extricating the brigade from the situation and joining the rest of the division. Both received the Order of the Red Banner for their actions on 26 November 1922. Smolin commanded the 47th Rifle Division between November 1919 and March 1920, and then the 21st Rifle Division between July and October of the latter year.

== Interwar period ==
After the end of the war, Smolin became commander of the 2nd Verkhneudinsk Rifle Division and the 11th Rifle Division and served as chief of the directorate of military educational institutions of the Moscow Military District between 1921 and 1923. After graduated from Higher Academic Courses at the Red Army Military Academy in 1923, he became commander of the 6th Rifle Division in July 1923. Going on to command the 3rd Rifle Corps between June and October 1924, Smolin became chief and military commissar of the organization department of the Main Directorate of the Red Army in November of that year. This assignment proved brief as a month later he became commander and military commissar of the 5th Rifle Corps. After serving as chief of the Vystrel course from May 1927, Smolin became assistant commander of the forces of the Red Banner Caucasus Army in December 1929. Succeeding to the command of the army in March 1932, Smolin served as chief and military commissar of the Military Engineering Academy from July 1934, receiving the rank of komkor when the Red Army introduced personal military tanks in 1935.

Smolin was arrested on 14 May 1937, and 20 September of that year sentenced to death by the Military Collegium of the Supreme Court of the Soviet Union on false charges of participating in a military conspiracy. He was shot on the same day, and was posthumously rehabilitated on 22 October 1955.

== Awards and honors ==
Smolin was recipient of the following decorations:

- Order of the Red Banner (1922)
- Order of the Red Banner of Labor of the Transcaucasian Socialist Federative Soviet Republic (1932)

Military offices
Preceded by	Commander of the 6th Rifle Division; 1923-1924	Succeeded by
Preceded by Ivan Fedko	Commander of the Red Banner Caucasus Army; 1932	Succeeded by Mikhail Lewandowski
