= Ural Army =

Military formation during Russian Civil War

The Ural Separate Army was a military formation of the White Army during the Russian Civil War which operated in the Volga region and the Southern Urals. It was formed on December 28, 1918, from units of the Ural Cossack Army and other military units within the Urals Region.

The Ural Army received the right to have a separate army headquarters. The composition and number of its soldiers varied between 15 and 25 thousand, depending on the situation on the fronts and the territory of action. This mostly isolated army experienced a constant and strong lack of weapons and ammunition. Most of the time the army was formally under the command of Admiral Alexander Kolchak, at the end of 1919 – at the beginning of 1920, it tried to coordinate with Anton Denikin.

== Actions ==
It first acted against Red Guard units, from June 1918 against the 4th and 1st armies of the Red Eastern Front and from August 15 against the Red Turkestan Front. In April 1919, during the general offensive of Kolchak's armies, it broke through the Red's front and besieged Uralsk, which had been abandoned in January 1919. It also approached Saratov and Samara, but its limited means did not allow to capture the Urals.

The Ural Army consisted of:

- 1st Ural Cossack Corps (1st and 2nd Ural Cossack Divisions),
- 2nd Iletsk Cossack Corps,
- 3rd Ural-Astrakhan Cossack Corps.

In early July 1919, the troops of the Red Turkestan Front launched a counteroffensive against the Ural Army. The well-equipped 25th Infantry Division, commanded by Vasily Chapayev and redeployed from Ufa, defeated units of the Ural Army on July 5–11, broke through the blockade of Uralsk, and entered the city on July 11, 1919. The Ural Army began to retreat on all fronts.

On September 5, 1919, the Ural Army obtained its last success when it executed the Lbishchensk raid, in which the divisional headquarters of the Red 25th Infantry Division were ambushed near Lbishchensk and commander Vasily Chapayev and some 2,500 soldiers were killed.

== Defeat ==
But after the collapse of Kolchak's Eastern Front in October–November 1919, the Ural Army was isolated by superior forces of the Reds, thereby losing all sources of replenishment with weapons and ammunition. The defeat of the Ural Army by the Bolsheviks was only a matter of time.

On November 2, the Red Turkestan Front consisting of the 1st and 4th armies (18,500 infantry, 3,500 cavalry, 86 guns and 365 machine guns) launched a general offensive against the Ural Army (5,200 infantry, 12,000 cavalry, 65 guns, 249 machine guns), planning to surround and destroy the main forces of the Ural Army with concentrated attacks on Lbishchensk from the north and east. Under the pressure of the superior forces of the Reds, the Ural Army began a retreat. On November 20, the Reds captured Lbishchensk, but they could not surround the main force of the Ural Army. The front stabilized south of Lbishchensk. The Turkestan Front called up reserves and was replenished with weapons and ammunition. The Ural Army had neither reserves nor ammunition.

On December 10, 1919, the Reds resumed the offensive. The resistance of the weakened Ural Army units was broken and the front collapsed. On December 11, Zhalpaktal fell and on December 18, the Reds captured the city of Tajpak, thereby cutting off the route of retreat for the Iletsk Corps. On December 22 the Gorsky settlement, one of the last strongholds of the Ural Army before the city of Guryev, was also lost.

The army commander, General Vladimir Tolstov, and his staff retreated to Guryev on the Caspian Sea. The remnants of the Iletsk Corps, suffering heavy losses in the battles during the retreat and from typhus, were almost completely destroyed or captured by Red troops near Malyy Baybuz on January 4, 1920. At the same time, the Kirghiz regiment of this corps almost completely went over to the side of the troops of the Alash Autonomy, which at that time acted as allies of the Bolsheviks. The Kirghiz captured the headquarters of the Iletsk corps, the 4th and 5th Iletsky divisions, and handed them over as prisoners to the red Corps commander. Lieutenant-General Vladimir Akutin was shot by the troops of the 25th ("Chapayevsky") division (according to other sources, was arrested and taken to Moscow, where he was later shot). The 6th Iletsk Division, which retreated to the Volga across the steppe of the Bukey Horde, was almost completely whipped out by disease, hunger and Red Army bullets.

== Death March ==
On January 5, 1920, the city of Guryev was taken by the Red Army. A part of the Ural Army became prisoners, a part of the Cossacks went over to the Reds. The remnants of the Ural Army, led by the army commander General V.S. Tolstov, decided to leave for the south, hoping to unite with the White Turkestan Army of General Boris Kazanovich. A caravan with carts and civilians (families and refugees), totaling about 15,000 people, headed south along the eastern coast of the Caspian Sea towards Fort Alexandrovsk. The march took place in January – March 1920, under very difficult conditions of a harsh winter in a deserted landscape with icy winds and frost down to minus 30 degrees and in absence of sufficient drinking water and a catastrophic shortage of food and medicine. On 10 February, the Red Army took Krasnovodsk, south of Fort Alexandrovsk.

The goal was to be evacuated on ships of the Caspian Flotilla of the AFSR to the other side of the Caspian sea in Port Petrovsk. By the time of arrival at Fort Alexandrovsk, less than 3,000 Cossacks remained from the Army, most of whom suffered from different stages of typhoid or frostbite. The sense of the campaign was lost, when by the end of March 1920, Denikin's troops were retreating in the Caucasus and Port Petrovsk was abandoned.

Most Cossacks were captured or killed by the Red Army at Fort Alexandrovsk. On April 4, 1920, the Ural Army had ceased to exist. Only a small detachment of 214 people (several generals, officers, Cossacks, and civilians (family members), led by Ataman Vladimir Tolstov, marched on towards Persia. 162 of them survived the march and reached Persia on June 2.

== Army commanders ==
- Major General M. F. Martynov (April – September 1918);
- Major General Vladimir Akutin (late September – November 14, 1918)
- Lieutenant-General Nikolai Savelyev (November 15, 1918 – April 7, 1919),
- Major General (from November 7, 1919, Lieutenant General) Vladimir Tolstov (April 8, 1919 – beginning of 1920).

== Sources ==
- Swolkov Ural Army (Уральская армия) in Russian
- Xenophon
