= Mikhail Levandovsky =

Soviet Komandarm 2nd rank (1890–1938)

Mikhail Karlovich Levandovsky
- Born: 15 May 1890; Tiflis, Russian Empire
- Died: 29 July 1938 (aged 48) Moscow, Soviet Union
- Buried: Kommunarka shooting ground
- Allegiance: Russian Empire; Soviet Union
- Branch: Imperial Russian Army; Soviet Red Army
- Commands: 9th Army (RSFSR); 11th Army (RSFSR); 10th Terek-Dagestan Army; Red Banner Caucasus Army; Siberian Military District; Transcaucasian Military District; Maritime Group of Forces
- Conflicts: World War I; Russian Civil War; Invasion of Azerbaijan; Invasion of Georgia; Basmachi Movement

Mikhail Karlovich Levandovsky (Russian: Михаил Карлович Левандовский; 15 May 1890 – 29 July 1938) was a Soviet Komandarm 2nd rank. He fought in World War I in the Imperial Russian Army and in the Russian Civil War in the Soviet Red Army. He participated in the Soviet invasions of Georgia and Azerbaijan. He commanded forces in both the Caucasus and Siberia.

During the Great Purge, he was arrested on 23 February 1938 and later executed.

== Decorations ==
- Order of Saint Stanislaus (1916)
- Order of the Red Banner (1920)
- Order of Lenin (1935)

== Bibliography ==
- Great Soviet Encyclopedia, XIV, Moscow 1973.
- W. M. Ivanov, Marshal Tukhachevsky, Wojeizdat, Moscow 1990.

Military offices
Preceded by August Kork	Commander of the Red Banner Caucasus Army; November 1925 – October 1928	Succeeded by Konstantin Avksentevsky
Preceded by Nikolay Kuibyshev	Commander of the Siberian Military District; 1930–1933	Succeeded by Yan Gaylit
Preceded by Ivan Smolin	Commander of the Red Banner Caucasus Army; November 1933 – May 1935	Succeeded by himself as Commander of the Transcaucasian Military District
Preceded by himself as Commander of the Red Banner Caucasus Army	Commander of the Transcaucasian Military District; May 1935 – June 1937	Succeeded by Nikolay Kuibyshev
Preceded by Ivan Fedko	Commander of the Maritime Group of Forces; June 1937 – February 1938	Succeeded by Kuzma Podlas
