= Konstantin Avksentevsky =

Soviet military commander (1890–1941)

Konstantin Alekseyevich Avksentevsky
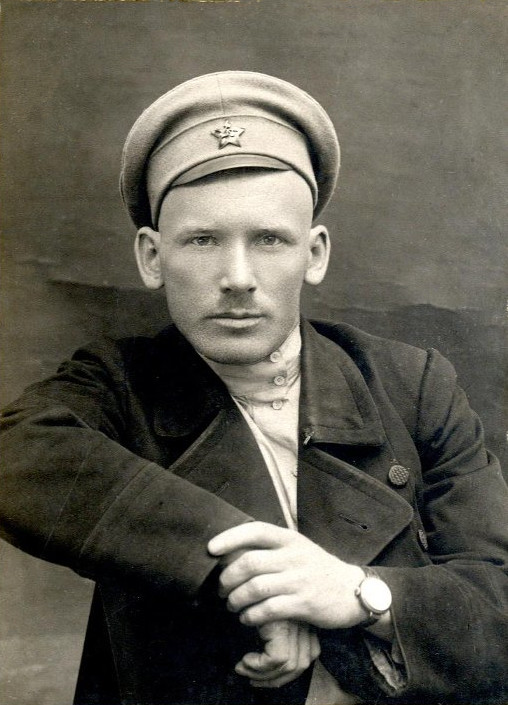
- Born: 1890; Totemsky Uyezd, Vologda Governorate, Russian Empire
- Died: 1941 (aged 50–51) Moscow, Soviet Union
- Allegiance: Russian Empire; Soviet Union
- Branch: Imperial Russian Army; Soviet Red Army
- Service years: 1914–1931
- Commands: 4th Army; 6th Army; Turkestan Front; Central Asian Military District; Red Banner Caucasus Army
- Conflicts: World War I Russian Civil War Basmachi Movement

Konstantin Alekseyevich Avksentevsky (Russian: Константин Алексеевич Авксентьевский; October 12, 1890 – November 2, 1941) was a Soviet army commander. He fought in the Imperial Russian Army during World War I and for the Bolsheviks in the subsequent civil war. He was a recipient of the Order of the Red Banner. He commanded forces in both Central Asia and the Caucasus.

In July 1938 - February 1939 he was imprisoned in Ukhtpechlag. In June 1939, the criminal case was dismissed. He then worked as an inspector of the cultural and educational part of the farm "Novy Bor" at the mouth of the Pechora River.
According to official data, he died on November 2, 1941, in the village Medvezhka in the Ust-Tsilemsky District. According to other sources, in November 1941 he was already in Moscow and he was killed when criminals attempted to rob his apartment. He was buried in Vologda, on the Vvedensky cemetery.

Preceded by Office created	Commander of the Central Asian Military District; 1926–1928	Succeeded by Pavel Dybenko
Preceded by Mikhail Lewandowski	Commander of the Red Banner Caucasus Army; 1928–1931	Succeeded by Ivan Fedko
