= Gay, Armenia =

Gai Գայ Gay Guy Kai
- Location within Armenia
- Coordinates: 40°05′02″N 44°18′20″E
- Country: Armenia
- Province: Armavir
- Municipality: Araks
- Founded: 1670s

Population (2011)
  - Total: 3,614
- Time zone: UTC+4

Gai (Armenian: Գայ [ɡɑj]), known as Khatunarkh until 1978 (and also spelled Guy or Gay or Kai), is a village in the Armavir Province of Armenia. It was founded in the 1670s, and named for the wife of Sefi Khan, Safavid governor of Chokhur-e Sa'd. In 1978, it was renamed in honour of Russian Civil War hero Hayk Bzhshkian, whose nom-de-guerre was Gai.
