= Nerkin Khatunarkh =

Village in Ararat, Armenia

- Location within Armenia Location within Ararat
- Coordinates: 40°04′52″N 44°18′56″E
- Country: Armenia
- Marz (Province): Ararat
- Time zone: UTC+4 ( )
  - Summer (DST): UTC+5 ( )

Nerkin Khatunarkh (also, Nizhniy Khatunarkh) is a village in the Ararat Province of Armenia.

== See also ==
- Ararat Province
