= Turkestan Front =

Red Army front during the Russian Civil War

The Turkestan Front (Russian: Туркестанский фронт) was a front of the Red Army during the Russian Civil War, which was formed on the territory of Turkestan Military District by Order of the Republic of Turkestan on 23 February 1919. It was formed a second time by the directive of the Commander-in-Chief on 11 August 1919, on the territory of Samara, Astrakhan, Orenburg Province and Ural region by renaming the Southern group of armies from the Eastern Front of the RSFSR. Its headquarters were in Samara and by 1920 the Turkestan Front counted some 114,000 soldiers.

== Operations ==
In May–July 1919 troops of the Turkestan Front defeated the Turkestan Army, an armed Formation of the AFSR in the Caspian region.
In 1919, the troops of the Turkestan Front defeated the Southern Army of Admiral Kolchak, broke through the blockade of Turkestan (13 September 1919) and joined with the troops of the Turkestan Soviet Republic.

Until mid-October 1919, the Turkestan Front fought against the Ural Cossack Army of General Vladimir Tolstov and the Army of Anton Denikin in the lower Volga and the Ural River. In the Ural-Guryev operation of 1919–1920, the troops of the Turkestan Front defeated the Ural Army and the Kazakh horde, and soon liquidated the White troops in Semirechye. As a result of the Bukhara operation (1920), the Emirate of Bukhara was overthrown.

In 1921–1926, the troops of the Turkestan Front fought against the Basmachi movement in the Fergana Valley, Eastern Bukhara and Khiva. On 12 October 1922, the commander of the Turkestan Front ordered the formation of the 13th Rifle Corps from troops located on the territory of the Bukharan People's Soviet Republic and Samarkand region.

After the suppression of the Basmachi Movement in June 1926, the Turkestan Front was transformed into the Central Asian Military District.

== Composition ==
- 1st Army
- 4th Army
- Turkestan Army
- Astrakhan Group of troops (until 14 October 1919, when it became part of the 11th Army)

== Commanders ==
Commanders were:

- Ivan Belov (April 1919 – August 1919),
- Mikhail Frunze (15 August 1919 – 10 September 1920),
- Grigori Sokolnikov (10 September 1920 – 8 March 1921),
- Vladimir Lazarevich (8 March 1921 – 11 February 1922),
- Vasily Shorin (11 February – 18 October 1922),
- August Kork (18 October 1922 – 12 August 1923),
- Semyon Pugachov (12 August 1923 – 30 April 1924),
- Mikhail Levandovsky (30 April 1924 – 2 December 1925),
- Konstantin Avksentevsky (2 December 1925 – 4 June 1926).

Members of the Revolutionary Military Council included:

- Shalva Eliava
- Valerian Kuybyshev
- Yan Rudzutak
- Reingold Berzin
- Alexander Todorsky
- Nikolai Kuzmin
