= Basmachi movement =

1916–1934 Central Asian uprising

- Part of World War I and the Russian Civil War
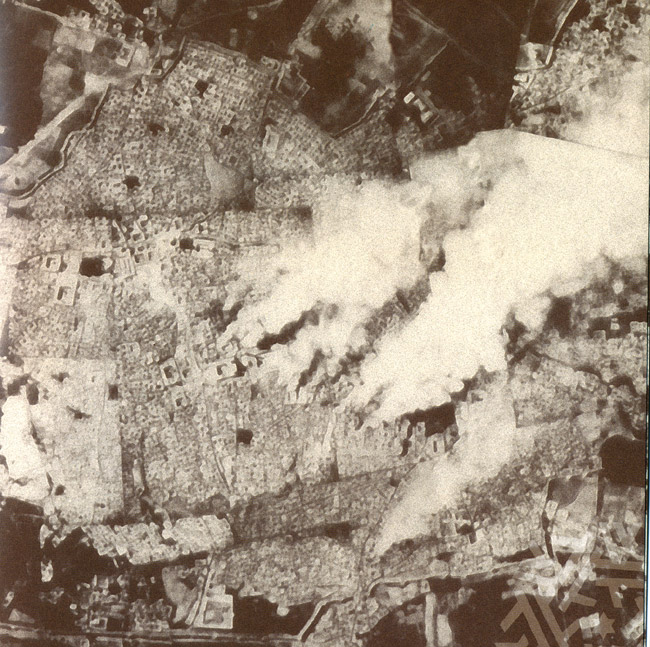
- Bukhara burning under siege by Red Army troops during the Bukhara operation, 1 September 1920
Date	1916–1934
Location	Russian Turkestan
Result	Soviet victory
Territorial changes	Turkestan incorporated into the Soviet Union

Belligerents
Russian Republic (1917): Russian SFSR; Turkestan ASSR; Kirghiz ASSR; Khorezm PSR; Bukharan PSR; Soviet Union (from December 30, 1922); In cooperation with: (Kingdom of Afghanistan) Amanullah loyalists (1929); Kingdom of Afghanistan (1930)	Basmachi movement; Khanate of Khiva (1918–20); Alash Autonomy (1919–20); Emirate of Bukhara (1920); Supported by: Afghanistan (until mid-1922); (Emirate of Afghanistan (1929)) Saqqawists (1929); Emirate of Afghanistan (1929)	(Russia) White Army; (Russia) Peasant Army of Fergana

Commanders and leaders
(Russian Soviet Federative Socialist Republic) Mikhail Frunze #; (Russian Soviet Federative Socialist Republic) Grigory Sokolnikov; (Russian Soviet Federative Socialist Republic) Pyotr Kobozev; (Russian Soviet Federative Socialist Republic) Yakov Melkumov; (Russian Soviet Federative Socialist Republic) Vitaly Primakov; (Russian Soviet Federative Socialist Republic) Vasily Shorin; (Russian Soviet Federative Socialist Republic) August Kork; (Russian Soviet Federative Socialist Republic) Semyon Pugachov; (Russian Soviet Federative Socialist Republic) Mikhail Levandovsky; (Russian Soviet Federative Socialist Republic) Konstantin Avksentevsky; (Russian Soviet Federative Socialist Republic) Vladimir Lazarevich; (Russian Soviet Federative Socialist Republic) Magaza Masanchi; (Bukharan People's Soviet Republic) Fayzulla Xoʻjayev; (Kingdom of Afghanistan) Mohammad Nadir Shah; (Kingdom of Afghanistan) Sardar Shah Wali Khan; (Kingdom of Afghanistan) Ghulam Nabi Khan	Ibrahim Bek †; Irgash Bey †; Madamin Bey †; (Khanate of Khiva) Junaid Khan (surrendered); (Emirate of Bukhara) Muhammad Alim Khan (surrendered); Korşirmat; (Emirate of Afghanistan (1929)) Habibullāh Kalakāni (executed); Enver Pasha † (November 1921 – August 1922)	(Russia) Konstantin Monstrov †

Strength
(Russian Soviet Federative Socialist Republic) Turkestan Front: 120,000–160,000	Perhaps 30,000 at its height, over 20,000 (late 1919)	(Russia) Peasant Army of Fergana: 20,000

Casualties and losses
9,338 killed or died of disease; 29,617 wounded or sick (January 1921 – July 1922); 516 killed; 867 wounded or sick (October 1922 – June 1931) *Alternative soviet casualties: 327,000 (1920–1923); Total: 40,000+ casualties; 9,854+ dead; 30,484+ wounded or sick	Tens of thousands of civilians killed; Several hundred thousand Kazakh and Kyrgyz people killed or evicted with an unknown amount dying to famine according to Sokol; Alternative estimate: 150,000 dead in 1916	Unknown

The Basmachi movement (Russian: Басмачество, romanized: Basmachestvo, derived from Uzbek: Босмачи, romanized: Bosmachi, lit. 'bandits') was an uprising against Imperial Russian and Soviet rule in Central Asia. The movement was not a unified organization as it had different political groups that wanted different things regarding self-rule. The Basmachi movement has been called "probably the most important movement of opposition to Soviet rule in Central Asia".

The movement's roots lay in the anti-conscription violence of 1916 which erupted when the Russian Empire began to draft Muslims for army service in World War I. In the months following the October 1917 Revolution, the Bolsheviks seized power in many parts of the Russian Empire and the Russian Civil War began. Turkestani Muslim political movements attempted to form an autonomous government in the city of Kokand, in the Fergana Valley. The Bolsheviks launched an assault on Kokand in February 1918 and carried out a general massacre of up to 25,000 people. The massacre rallied support to the Basmachi who waged a guerrilla and conventional war that seized control of large parts of the Fergana Valley and much of Turkestan. The movement's goal was to defend the customary local way of life, which was perceived as being threatened by the Russians.

One of the group's most prominent leaders was Ibrahim Bek. Enver Pasha, former Ottoman war minister and one of the key architects of the Armenian genocide, joined the movement after November 1921, seeking to create a pan-Turkist and pan-Islamist Empire. However, the rebels were not interested in either pan-Turkism or pan-Islamism and Basmachi leaders were openly hostile towards him. He died in August 1922, but his short involvement left lasting damage to the movement due to his military failures and diversion from the Basmachi's original goals. He is considered one of the reasons for the movement's ultimate failure.

By 1923 the Red Army's extensive campaigns had dealt the Basmachis many defeats. After major Red Army campaigns and concessions regarding economic and Islamic practices in the mid-1920s, the military fortunes and popular support of the Basmachi declined. Resistance to Soviet leadership did flare up again, to a lesser extent, in response to collectivization campaigns in the pre-World War II era.

== Etymology ==
The term "Basmachi" is of Uzbek origin and means "bandit" or "robber" which probably derived from "Bosqinchi" meaning "attacker". The Russians used the term for the Central Asian resistance fighters, and it was widely used throughout the region to denote them, in an attempt to persuade the public that the fighters were no more than criminals.

== History ==
=== Background ===
Prior to World War I, Russian Turkestan was ruled from Tashkent as a Krai or Governor-Generalship. To the east of Tashkent, the Ferghana Valley was an ethnically diverse, densely populated region that was divided between settled farmers (often called Sarts) and nomads (mostly Kyrgyz). Under Russian rule, it was converted into a major cotton-growing region. The resulting economic development brought some small-scale industry to the region, but several scholars suggest that native shop workers were worse off than their Russian counterparts, and the new wealth from cotton was spread unevenly; many farmers became indebted. Many criminals organized into bands, forming the basis for the early Basmachi movement when it began in the Ferghana Valley.

Cotton price-fixing during World War I made matters worse, and a large, landless rural proletariat soon developed. Muslim clergy decried the gambling and alcoholism that became commonplace, and crime rose considerably.

Major violence in Russian Turkestan broke out in 1916, when the Tsarist government ended its exemption of Muslims from military service. This caused the Central Asian revolt of 1916, centered in modern-day Kazakhstan and Uzbekistan, which was put down by martial law. Tensions between Central Asians (especially Kazakhs) and Russian settlers led to large-scale massacres on both sides. Thousands died, and hundreds of thousands fled, most into the neighbouring Republic of China. The Central Asian revolt of 1916 was the first anti-Russian incident on a mass scale in Central Asia, and it set the stage for native resistance after the fall of Tsar Nicholas II in the following year.

The suppression of the rebellion was a deliberate campaign of annihilation against the Kazakh and Kyrgyz tribes on the part of the Russian soldiers and settlers. Hundreds of thousands of Kazakh and Kyrgyz people were killed or expelled. The ethnic cleansing had its roots in the Tsarist government policy of ethnic homogenization.

=== Conflict ===
==== Kokand autonomy and the start of hostilities ====
Flag of the Basmachi movement

In the aftermath of the February Revolution of 1917, Muslim political forces began to organize. Members of the All-Russian Muslim council formed the Shura-i Islam (Islamic Council), a Jadidist body that sought a federated, democratic state with autonomy for Muslims. More conservative religious scholars formed the Ulema Jemyeti (Board of Learned Men), more concerned with safeguarding Islamic institutions and Sharia law. Together, these Muslim nationalists formed a coalition, but it fell apart after the October Revolution, when the Jadids lent their support to the Bolsheviks who had seized power. The Tashkent Soviet of Soldiers' and Workers' Deputies, an organization dominated by Russian railway workers and colonial proletarians, rejected Muslim participation in government. Stung by this apparent reaffirmation of colonial rule, the Shura-i Islam reunited with Ulema Jemyeti to form the Kokand Autonomous Government. This was to be the nucleus of an autonomous state in Turkestan, governed by Sharia law.

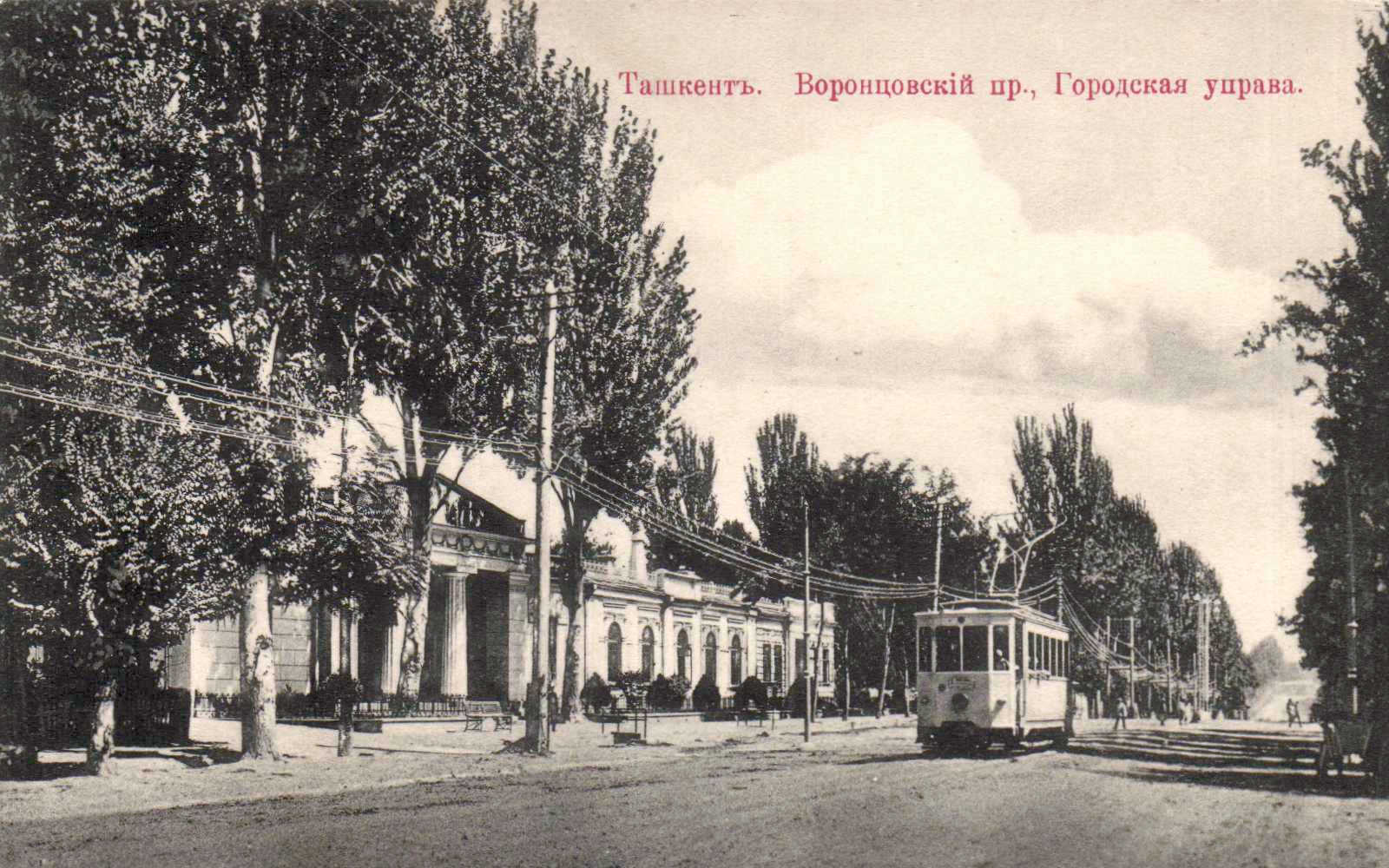
The Tashkent Soviet's building in 1917

The Tashkent Soviet initially recognized the authority of Kokand, but restricted its jurisdiction to the Muslim old section of Tashkent, and demanded the final say in regional affairs. After violent riots in Tashkent, relations broke down, and despite the leftist leanings of many of its members, Kokand aligned itself with the Whites. Politically and militarily weak, the Muslim government began looking around for protection. To this end, a band of armed robbers led by Irgash Bey were amnestied and recruited to defend Kokand. This force, however, was unable to resist an attack on Kokand by the forces of the Tashkent Soviet. In February, 1918 the Red Army soldiers thoroughly pillaged Kokand, and carried out what was described as a "pogrom", in which as many as 25,000 people died. This massacre, along with the execution of many Ferghana peasants who were suspected of hoarding cotton and food, incensed the Muslim population. Irgash Bey took up arms against the Soviets, declaring himself "Supreme Leader of the Islamic Army", and the Basmachi rebellion started in earnest.

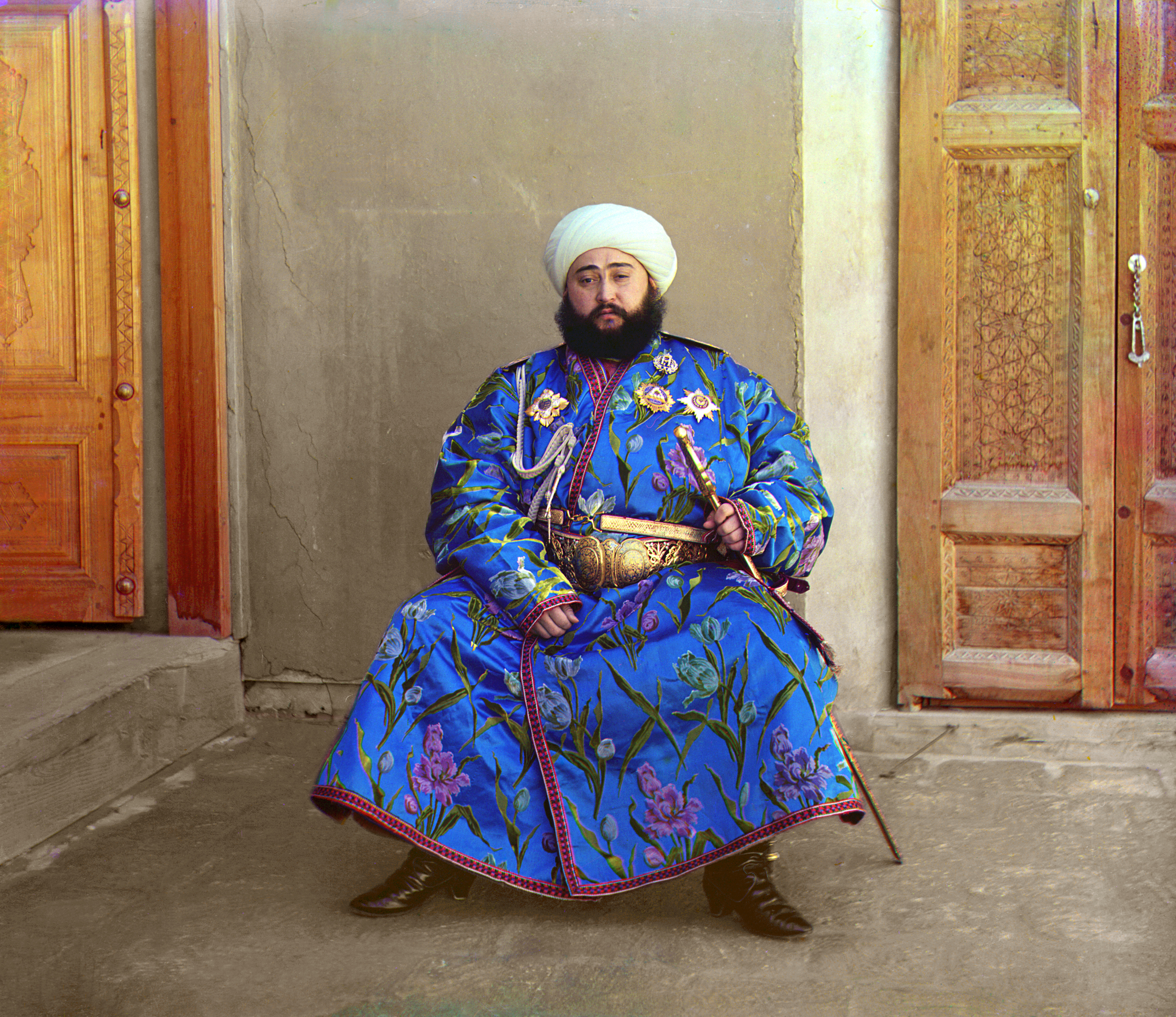
Sayeed Alim Khan of Bukhara (1880–1944), the last Uzbek monarch

Meanwhile, Soviet troops temporarily deposed Emir Sayeed Alim Khan of Bukhara in favor of the leftist Young Bukharans faction led by Fayzulla Xoʻjayev. Russian troops were repulsed by the Bukharan populace after a period of looting, and the Emir retained his throne for the time-being. In the Khanate of Khiva, Basmachi leader Junaid Khan overthrew the Russian puppet and suppressed the modernizing movement of the leftist Young Khivans.

==== First phase of the revolt in the Ferghana Valley ====
Irgash Bey's claims to leadership of an army of the faithful won recognition by the clergy of the Ferghana Valley, and he soon controlled a sizable fighting force. Widespread nationalization campaigns carried out from Tashkent had caused economic collapse, and the Ferghana Valley faced famine in absence of grain imports. All these factors drove people to join the Basmachi. The Tashkent Soviet was unable to contain the insurgency, and the end of 1918 decentralized bands of fighters, totaling roughly 20,000, controlled Ferghana and the countryside surrounding Tashkent. Irgash Bey faced rival commanders such as Madamin Bey, who was supported by more moderate Muslim factions, but he secured formal, nominal leadership of the movement at a council in March 1919.

With the Tashkent Soviet in a vulnerable military position, the Bolsheviks left Russian settlers to organize their own defense by creating the Peasant Army of Fergana. This often involved brutal reprisals for Basmachi attacks by Soviet forces and Russian farmers both. The harsh policies of War Communism, however, caused the peasants' army to sour on the Tashkent Soviet. In May 1919, Madamin Bey formed an alliance with the settlers, entailing a non-aggression pact and a coalition army. The new allies made plans for establishing a joint Russian-Muslim state, with power sharing arrangements and cultural rights for both groups. Disputes over the Islamic orientation of the Basmachi led to the break-up of the alliance, however, and both Madamin and the settlers suffered defeats at the hands of the Muslim Volga Tatar Red Brigade. The inhabitants of the Ferghana Valley were exhausted after the punishing winter of 1919–20, and Madamin Bey defected to the Soviet side in March. Meanwhile, famine relief reached the region under the more moderate New Economic Policy, while land reform and amnesty placated Ferghana residents. As a result, the Basmachi movement lost control of most populated areas and shrank overall.

The pacification of Ferghana did not last long. During the summer of 1920 the Soviets felt secure enough to requisition food and mobilize Muslim conscripts. The result was a renewed uprising and new Basmachi groups proliferated, fueled by religious slogans. Renewed conflict would see the Basmachi movement spread across Turkestan. Meanwhile, Dungan Muslim Magaza Masanchi formed the Dungan Cavalry Regiment to fight for the Soviets against the Basmachi.

==== Basmachi in Khiva and Bukhara ====
In January 1920, the Red Army captured Khiva and set up a Young Khivan provisional government. Junaid Khan fled into the desert with his followers, and the Basmachi movement in the Khorezm Region was born. Before the end of the year, the Soviets deposed the Young Khivans government, and the Muslim nationalists fled to join Junaid, strengthening his forces considerably.

In August of that year, the Emir of Bukhara was finally deposed when the Red Army conquered Bukhara. From exile in Afghanistan, the Emir directed the Bokhara Basmachi movement, supported by the angry populace and clergy. Fighters operated on behalf of the Emir and were under the command of Ibrahim Bey, a tribal leader. Basmachi forces operated with success in both Khiva and Bokhara for an extended period. The insurgency also began spreading to Kazakhstan, as well as the Tajik and Turkmen lands.

==== Defeat of the movement ====
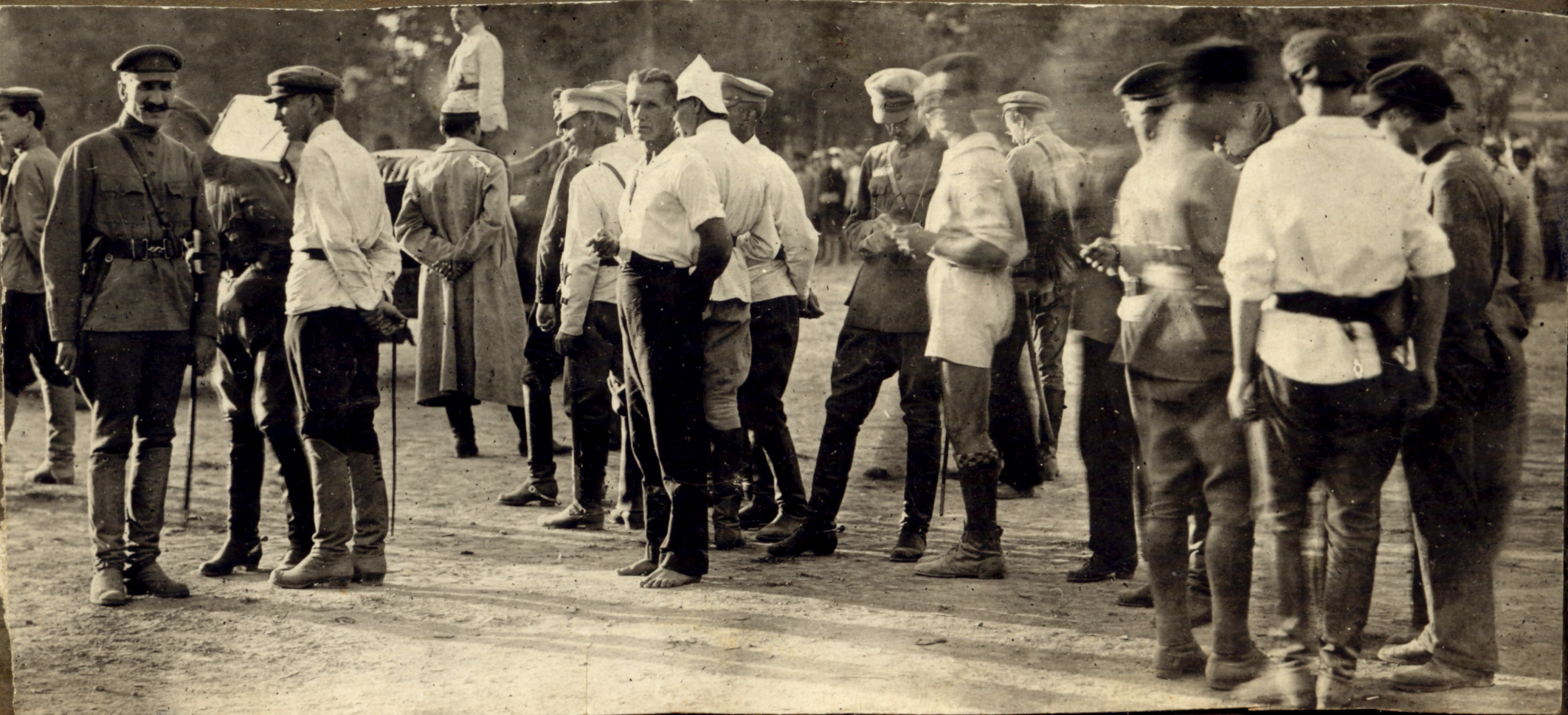
Turkestan front, 1922

Soviet Central Asia in 1922

Now fearing the total loss of Turkestan, the Soviet authorities once again adopted a double strategy to crush the rebellion: political reconciliation and cultural concessions along with overwhelming military power. Religious concessions reinstated Sharia law, while Koran schools and waqf lands were restored. Moscow sought to indigenize the fight with the creation of a volunteer militia composed of Muslim peasants, called the Red Sticks, and it is estimated that 15-25 percent of Soviet troops in this region were Muslim. The Soviets primarily relied on thousands of regular Red Army troops, veterans of the Civil War, now bolstered by air support. The strategy of concessions with airstrikes was successful, and when in May 1922 Enver Pasha rejected a peace offer and issued an ultimatum demanding that all Red Army troops be withdrawn from Turkestan within fifteen days, Moscow was well prepared for a confrontation. In June 1922 Soviet units led by General Kakurin (ru) defeated the Basmachi forces in the Battle of Kafrun. The Red Army began to drive the rebels eastwards, retaking considerable territory. Enver himself was killed in a failed last-ditch cavalry charge on August 4, 1922, near Baldzhuan (in present-day Tajikistan). His successor, Selim Pasha, continued the struggle but finally fled to Afghanistan in 1923.

In July to August 1923, a large Soviet offensive succeeded at forcing the Basmachi out of Garm. A Basmachi presence remained in the Ferghana Valley until 1924, and fighters there were led by Korşirmat (or Kurshirmat), who had renewed the revolt in 1920. British intelligence reported that Kurshirmat possessed forces of 5,000-6,000 men. After years of war, however, popular support for the Basmachi cause was drying up. Peasants wanted to return to work. Kurshirmat's forces shrank to around 2,000, many resorting to banditry, and he soon fled to Afghanistan. Turkestan was at this point exhausted by war. 200,000 people had fled Tajik lands, leaving two-thirds of arable land abandoned. Lesser devastation could be observed in Ferghana.

==== Cross-border operations in northern Afghanistan ====
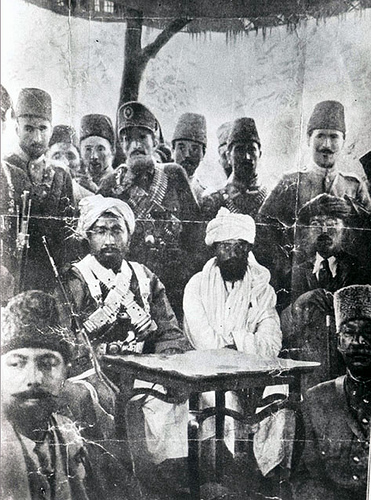
Habibullah Kalakani pictured with his followers in Afghanistan, gave a safe haven for Basmachi fighters

===== 1929 =====
In January 1929, after coming to power in Afghanistan during the Afghan Civil War (1928–1929), Habibullāh Kalakāni allowed Basmachi insurgents to operate in northern Afghanistan, who then had established themselves in Imanseiide, Khan Abad, Rostaq, Taloqan, Fayzabad by the end of March 1929. In mid-March 1929, two raids were undertaken by the Afghan Basmachi into the Soviet Union, the first into Amu Darya, south-west of Kulyab, and the second was undertaken by Kurbashi Kerim Berdoi with 100 Basmachi troops. Both incursions were defeated. Further incursions were repelled on 17 March and 7 April. On 12 April, Basmachi insurgents successfully crossed the Panj River and captured the town of Togmai. Soon after, this force then reached Dzafr and Kevron. On 13 April, the Basmachi captured Qal'ai Khumb. and a few days later, occupied Gashion, and on the 15th, they captured Vanch, which the Soviets recaptured the next day.

Because of the Basmachi attacks, the Soviet Union dispatched a small force into Afghanistan from Termez on April 15, commanded by Vitaly Primakov, to support ousted Afghan King Amanullah Khan. This Red Army force of 700 to 1,000 eventually took control of the city of Mazar-i-Sharif and Tashqurghan. During the Soviet operation the Basmachi continued raiding across the border, capturing Kalai-Liabob on 20 April, and on 21 April capturing Nimichi, 35 kilometres east of Garm, after an intense battle. Between 20 and 22 April, further Basmachi units crossed into the Soviet Union, one of which made it as far as Tavildara before being turned back by the guards there on 30 April. On 22 April, the Basmachi captured Garm, which the Soviets recaptured either the same day or the next day. On 24 April, the Soviets began a large counteroffensive, and recaptured Kalai-Liabob that same day. On 3 May, the last Basmachi units retreated into Afghanistan.

The Red Army had planned to head for Kabul to take it back from the Saqqawists to Amanullah Khan. However the operation was halted after Moscow heard that Amanullah Khan had fled to the British Raj in exile on 23 May. In addition, international resentment (at a time the Soviet Union attempted to gain international recognition) was also cited as a reason for canceling the operation. The last Soviet unit crossed back from Afghanistan in June 1929.

===== 1930 =====
After the Saqqawists lost the civil war and Kalakani was executed, the Afghan prime minister Mohammad Hashim Khan on behalf of the new king, Mohammed Nader Shah, demanded Ibrahim Bek to lay down arms against the Soviet Union, but he refused. Afghanistan and Soviet Union agreed for another intervention, launched by the Red Army in June 1930 and commanded by Colonel Yakov Melkumov. The cavalry brigade advanced 50–70 km inland in northern Afghanistan and was carefully controlled as to not "touch" the farms and property of locals as to not affect their nationalistic or religious feelings. This was relatively successful, as the Afghan locals were friendly and guided them. Ibrahim Bek initially wanted to fight but after hearing of the cavalry's strength and lack of local Afghan sympathy, he halted plans. As a result, the Soviets did not face organized resistance and managed to eliminate the Basmachis and their accomplices. The yurts in the river valley including the villages of Aq Tepe and 'Aliabad where Basmachis were based, and the Basmachi's properties, were burned down, although the local Afghan population remained untouched. The Basmachis and accomplices lost 839 people, whereas the Soviet army had one loss (from drowning) and two injuries.

==== Intermittent Basmachi operations after the Soviet victory ====
After the Basmachi movement was destroyed as a political and military force, the fighters who remained hidden in mountainous areas conducted a guerrilla war. The Basmachi uprising had died out in most parts of Central Asia by 1926. However, skirmishes and occasional fighting along the border with Afghanistan continued until the early 1930s. Junaid Khan threatened Khiva in 1926, but was finally exiled in 1928. Two prominent commanders, Faizal Maksum and Ibrahim Bey, continued to operate out of Afghanistan and conducted a number of raids into the Tajik Soviet Socialist Republic in 1929. Ibrahim Bek led a brief resurgence of the movement when collectivization fuelled resistance and succeeded in delaying the policy until 1931 in Turkmenistan, but he was soon caught and executed. The movement then largely died out. The last major Basmachi combat operation occurred In October 1933, when Junaid Khan's forces were defeated in the Karakum desert. The Basmachi movement had ended by 1934.

== Aftermath ==
Indigenous leaders began to cooperate with Soviet authorities and large numbers of Central Asians joined the Communist Party of the Soviet Union under Vladimir Lenin and Joseph Stalin's indigenization policy. Many gained high positions in the governments of the Uzbek, Tajik, Kyrgyz, Kazakh, and Turkmen Soviet Socialist Republics, formed out of the Turkestani Autonomous Soviet Socialist Republic in 1924. During the Sovietization of Central Asia, Islam became the focus of antireligious campaigns. The government closed most mosques, repressing Islamic clerics and targeting symbols of Islamic identity such as the veil. Uzbeks who remained practicing Muslims were deemed nationalist and often targeted for imprisonment or execution. Stalinist collectivization and industrialization proceeded as elsewhere in the Soviet Union.

== Character of the movement ==
Although many fighters were motivated by calls for jihad, the movement was made up of peasants and nomads, long opposed to Russian colonial rule, who reacted with hostility to anti-Islamic policies and Soviet requisitioning of food and livestock. The fact that Bolshevism in Turkestan was dominated by Russian colonists in Tashkent made Tsarist and Soviet rule appear identical. The ranks of the Basmachi were filled with those left jobless by poor economic conditions, and those who felt that they were opposing an attack on their way of life.

The first Basmachi fighters were bandits, as their name suggests, and they reverted to brigandage as the movement fizzled later on. The movement was neither a national-liberation movement nor nationalist, but rather a temporary tribal alliance focused on removing Russian rule from the region.

=== Soviet view on the movement ===
The Soviets portrayed the movement as being composed of brigands motivated by Islamic fundamentalism, waging a counter-revolutionary war with the support of British agents. The term 'basmachi' was pejorative and used by the Soviets; the people it referred to did not use it to refer to themselves. However, the Soviets noted how the movement was completely "deprived of all national spirit", noting its religious aspects instead.

=== Enver Pasha's involvement and political ideologies ===
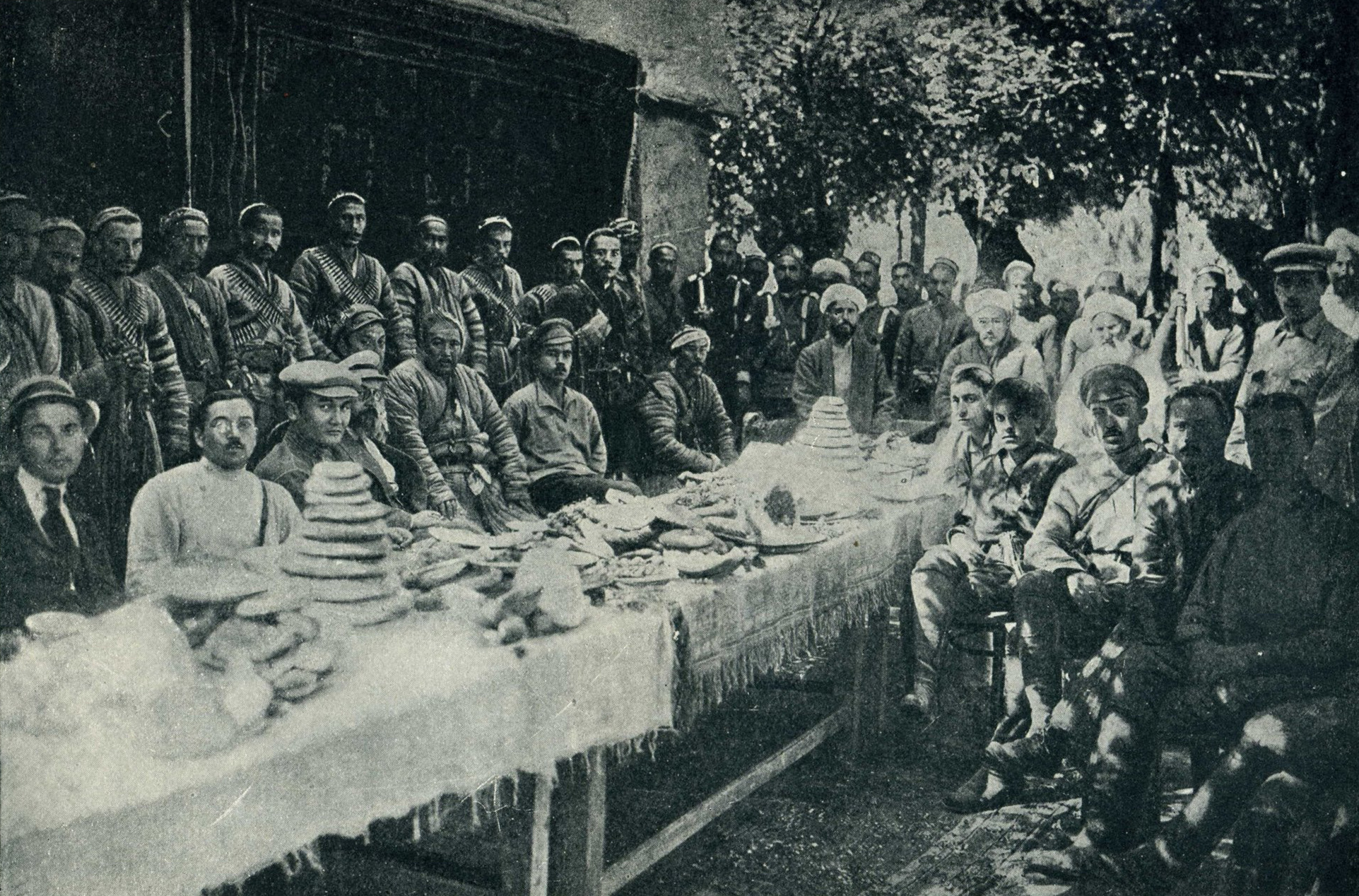
Negotiations with Basmachi, Fergana, 1921

Enver Pasha, former Ottoman war minister and one of the key architects of the Armenian genocide took part in the movement. His initial plan, before joining the movement, was to oust Mustafa Kemal, defeat the Greeks and establish a Turkish regime under his own leadership.

However, in November 1921 he was sent by the Soviets in Bukhara to assist the Soviet war effort. Enver Pasha had been an advocate of a Turkish-Soviet alliance against the British, and gained the trust of the Soviet authorities. Soon, however, he defected and sought to centralize and revitalize the movement. Enver Pasha intended to create a pan-Turkic confederation encompassing all of Central Asia, Afghanistan, as well as Anatolia and Chinese lands.

The importance of the role played by Enver Pasha is sometimes overestimated. In reality, he had minimal prestige and struggled to effectively manage the rebels, being considered an "outsider" by many Basmachi leaders, who were hostile towards him and viewed him with suspicion. Enver was notably opposed by Basmachi leader Ibrahim Bek who refused to associate with him and later became aggressive towards him.

Basmachi rebels opposed Enver Pasha's pan-Islamist and, especially, his Pan-Turkist ambitions. In fact, they never made any reference to pan-Turkism and only in Eastern Bukhara there were systematic calls for Muslim unity against the Bolsheviks.

According to historian Şuhnaz Yilmaz:

Even though religion played a very important role for the Basmachis, they were merely fighting against the oppressive policies of the Russians and had neither the power nor the intention of uniting the Islamic world. As for pan-Turkic ideals, 'The people knew little, and cared less, about Osmanli [Ottoman] dreams of Central Asian hegemony, if such exist; certainly Pan-Turanism did not figure on the Basmachi programme, whether inspired by Enver or not."

Meanwhile, historian and expert Marie Bennigsen-Broxup summarized the nature of the movement:

All the Basmachi used the same slogans, "Down with the Infidels and their Servants", "Russians go Home", "Restore the Power of the Emir", "Reestablish the Religious Courts", "Down with Unveiled Women" — all very simple. But they had no political programme nor did they use any "propaganda"; they had no political strategy and none of them spoke of a liberated Turkestan. Political independence was certainly not their goal. Pan-Islamic or Pan-Turkic dreams did not interest them. Enver's prospect of a unified Turkic world was beyond their understanding. If one wants to qualify their struggle, it could be said that it was the attempt of a rural community, threatened and economically ruined, to preserve its traditional spiritual values and way of life. It was neither an authentic liberation movement, nor a war against a foreign invader (the Russians were already in Turkestan) nor was it a holy war. The Basmachi had no clear idea of their national identity and never reached the level of a Pan-Turkestani consciousness. The uprising was aggravated by the violence and the brutality of the anti-Muslim policy of the Turksovnarkom and by the belief of the natives that the Russian Empire was crumbling and that it was a good occasion to try to kick the hated "Infidels" out.

Enver Pasha's intervention, which involved a small staff of Turkish officers, is considered to have been disastrous for the Basmachi movement. He diverted the Basmachi from their original goals and methods and accidentally inflicted heavy losses due to a premature move towards semi-regular warfare from which the Basmachis never truly recovered. He is considered to have been one of the reasons for the movement's failure.

=== Konstantin Monstrov's involvement ===
Konstantin Monstrov was the leader of the Peasant Army of Fergana. The Army was originally formed as a non-partisan self-defense unit against the Basmachi, who were targeting ethnic Russians. At first, they provided assistance to the Red Army and were paid as Red Army servicemen. However, Monstrov's Army was opposed to the Bolshevik policies such as the creation of the cheka and grain requisitions, and its members, which were Russian settlers, held a negative view towards the Soviet authorities. In addition, according to historian Vladimir Kotelnikov: "The state monopoly of bread imposed by Bolsheviks on 25 June 1919 was in fact a robbery of peasants. Ration squads raided the villages confiscating 'surplus food', i.e. everything above the minimum survival stocks to last until the next harvest. In some places those actions caused famine". This caused the Peasant Army of Monstrov to go in open conflict with the Soviets.

Meanwhile, Ibrahim Bek sought rapprochement with Monstrov; he forbade his units from attacking Russian settlers and also attacked Basmachi factions which were doing so. In late August 1919, Monstrov met with Ibrahim Bek and, on 1 September 1919, concluded an alliance with him. Their shared goals were "freedom of labor, trade, education, speech, and press", as well as "abolition of Chekas and political commissars". Some local warlords preferred Russian rule, such as Monstrov's to non-Russian rule, such as Bek's, so this alliance was considered a win-win scenario. Their collaboration is considered the "most successful and long-lasting" of the movement.

However, Monstrov became suspicious of the Basmachi movement after he noticed that the Afghans were pushing them towards pan-Islamism. He believed that to be "to be Muslim in this sense was to be anti-Russian" and opened truce talks with the Soviets on 12 January 1920. His stipulations to the Soviets were that "his army must remain armed and that if his troops were ordered to fight the Basmachi they would be granted certain privileges". On 17 January, Monstrov's terms were accepted and the Peasant Army reverted to its original state, assisting the Red Army again.

== In popular culture ==
The rebellion is featured in several "Osterns", such as White Sun of the Desert, The Seventh Bullet, and The Bodyguard, and in the television series State Border.

== Historiography ==
In Tajikistan, the Basmachi movement has been viewed differently overtime due to the shift from the Soviet to the post-Soviet era. During the Soviet period, the Basmachi movement was class-based and seen as anti-colonialist. After the Soviet Union collapsed, the Basmachi movement was viewed instead as participants "against Turkic oppression".

The Western perspective of the Basmachi movement has influenced how people think of it. Martha B. Olcott wrote "The Basmachi or Freemen's revolt in Turkestan", which played a big role in this perspective. Olcott argued that "The Basmachi played a critical role in the political modernization of Turkestan by bringing together the various elements of Central Asia". She also states that, "For the first time the Turkestanis began to develop a political identity".

Barmin V.A argues that "The collapse of the USSR, the access to formerly classified closed archives made it possible to largely change the view on the history of this popular protest". This statement may also partially explain why the perspective of the Basmachi movement has shifted.

== See also ==
- List of states and regions involved in the Russian Civil War
- Bibliography of the Russian Revolution and Civil War
- Outline of the Russian Revolution and Civil War
- Central Asian revolt of 1916
- Bibliography of the history of Central Asia

== Bibliography ==
- Baberowski, Jörg; Doering-Manteuffel, Anselm (2009). Geyer, Michael; Fitzpatrick, Sheila (eds.). Beyond Totalitarianism: Stalinism and Nazism compared. Cambridge University Press. ISBN 978-0-521-89796-9.
