= Leaders of the Russian Civil War =

Leaders of a Multi-Party Civil War in the former Russian Empire

The leaders of the Russian Civil War listed below include the important political and military figures of the Russian Civil War. The conflict, fought largely from 7 November 1917 to 25 October 1922 (though with some conflicts in the Far East lasting until late 1923 and in Central Asia until 1934), was fought between numerous factions, the two largest being the Bolsheviks (The "Reds") and the White Movement (The "Whites"). While the Bolsheviks were centralized under the administration of the Russian Soviet Federative Socialist Republic and the Russian Communist Party (Bolsheviks), led by Vladimir Lenin, along with their various satellite and buffer states, the White Movement was more decentralized, functioning as a loose confederation of anti-Bolshevik forces united only in opposition to their common enemy — though from September 1918 to April 1920, the White Armies were nominally united under the administration of the Russian State, when, for nearly two years, Admiral Alexander Kolchak served as the overall head of the White Movement and as the internationally recognized Head of State of Russia. In addition to the two primary factions, the war also involved a number of third parties, including the anarchists of the Revolutionary Insurgent Army of Ukraine, and the non-ideological Green Armies.

Unlike the Bolsheviks and the White Movement, the various third-party factions which took part in the conflict did not form a united front and often fought against each other as much as they fought against the larger belligerents, occasionally forming alliances when convenient, and breaking them almost as often. For instance, the Black Army fought alongside the Bolsheviks against the forces of Anton Denikin in South Russia, while the members of the Socialist-Revolutionary Party frequently cooperated with the White Army. A number of foreign nations also intervened against the Bolsheviks for various reasons, including the principal Allied Powers of World War I (in the Allied intervention in the Russian Civil War), and their German (in Ober Ost) and Austro-Hungarian opponents. In addition, a number of independence movements took the opportunity to break free from Russian control in the aftermath of the collapse of the Russian Empire, primarily fighting against the Bolsheviks, as well as against the White armies on occasion.

== Bolsheviks ==
=== Russian SFSR ===
Central Executive Committee of the All-Russian Congress of Soviets
Lev Kamenev
Yakov Sverdlov #
Mikhail Vladimirsky
Mikhail Kalinin

Council of People's Commissars
Vladimir Lenin

All-Russian Extraordinary Commission
Felix Dzerzhinsky
Jēkabs Peterss

Red Army
Leon Trotsky
(People's Commissar for Military and Naval Affairs)
High Command:
Vladimir Antonov-Ovseyenko
Nikolai Podvoisky
Pavel Dybenko
Nikolai Krylenko
Jukums Vācietis
Sergey Kamenev
Alexander Svechin
Mikhail Bonch-Bruyevich
Nikolay Rattel
Navy:
Vasili Altfater #
Yevgeny Berens
Aleksandr Nemits
Eduard Pantserzhanskiy
Fyodor Raskolnikov
Alexey Schastny (executed)
Air Service:
Konstantin Akashev
1st Cavalry Army:
Semyon Budyonny
Alexander Yegorov
Kliment Voroshilov
Iosif Apanasenko
Grigory Kulik
Alexander Parkhomenko †
Boris Dumenko (executed)
Konstantin Trunov †
Aleksa Dundić †
Semyon Timoshenko
Ivan Tyulenev
Efim Shchadenko
2nd Cavalry Army:
Oka Gorodovikov
Filipp Mironov (executed)
Aleksandr Borczaninow
Western Army:
Andrei Snesarev
Alexander Novikov
Vasily Glagolev
Nikolai Sollogub
Alexander Kuk
Yevgeny Shilovskiy
Latvian Riflemen:
Pēteris Stučka
Frīdrihs Kalniņš
Jānis Lācis
Reinholds Bērziņš
Antons Martusēvičs
Kirill Stutzka
Gustavs Mangulis
Eduard Berzin
Jānis Judiņš †
Red Cossacks:
Vitaly Primakov
Eastern Front:
Mikhail Muravyov †
Mikhail Tukhachevsky
Alexander Samoylo
Vladimir Olderogge
Rudolf Sivers †
Sergey Lazo (executed)
Yakov Tryapitsyn (executed)
Pavel Lebedev
Hayk Bzhishkyan
Vasily Chapayev †
Ivan Kutyakov
Yakov Korotayev
Sergei Mezheninov
Yan Gamarnik
Ivar Smilga
Ivan Smirnov
Sergey Gusev
Filipp Goloshchyokin
Mikhail Alafuso
Ivan Strod
Pavel Khokhryakov †
Mullanur Waxitov (executed)
Southern Front:
Joseph Stalin
Mikhail Levandovsky
Vladimir Yegoryev
Vladimir Gittis
Vladimir Azin (executed)
Pavel Sytin
Pēteris Slavens #
Vladimir Selivachyov #
Semyon Pugachov
Fyodor Podtelkov (executed)
Iona Yakir
Ivan Fedko
Dmitry Zhloba
Nikolay Kuibyshev
Mikhail Lashevich
Béla Kun
Caucasus Front:
Sergo Ordzhonikidze
Stepan Shaumian (executed)
Grigory Korganov (executed)
Ivan Sorokin (executed)
Alexei Avtonomov #
Anatoliy Gekker
Valentin Trifonov
Mikhail Velikanov
Filipp Makharadze
Sergei Kirov
Nariman Narimanov
Northern Front:
Dmitry Nadyozhny
August Kork
Dmitri Parsky #
Semyon Nakhimson †
Robert Brichenok
Yuri Guzarsky (executed)
Ukrainian Front:
Nikolay Shchors †
Ivan Dubovoy
Stanislav Kosior
Grigory Kotovsky
Nikolai Krivoruchko
Anton Słucki (executed)
Boris Shaposhnikov
Central Asian Front:
Mikhail Frunze
Grigori Sokolnikov
Vasily Shorin
Pyotr Kobozev
Ivan Belov
Alibi Dzhangildin
Amankeldı İmanov (executed)
Fyodor Kolesov
Shalva Eliava
Fayzulla Khodzhayev

=== Far Eastern Republic ===
Alexander Krasnoshchyokov
Nikolay Matveyev
Genrich Eiche
Vasily Blyukher
Konstantin Avksentevsky
Ieronim Uborevich
Stepan Vostretsov
Yakiv Pokus

=== Ukrainian SSR ===
Yukhym Medvedev
Volodymyr Zatonsky
Grigory Petrovsky
Georgy Pyatakov
Serafima Hopner
Emanuel Kviring
Yevgenia Bosch
Mykola Skrypnyk
Christian Rakovsky
Vasyl Shakhrai (executed)
Yuriy Kotsiubynsky
Fyodor Sergeyev †

=== Byelorussian SSR ===
Vilhelm Knorin
Alexander Chervyakov

=== Finnish Socialist Workers' Republic ===
Kullervo Manner
Yrjö Sirola
Ali Aaltonen (executed)
Eero Haapalainen
Evert Eloranta
Adolf Taimi
Eino Rahja
August Wesley
Mikhail Svechnikov
Georgy Bulatsel (executed)

=== Mongolian People's Revolutionary Party ===
Damdin Sükhbaatar
Soliin Danzan
Tseren-Ochiryn Dambadorj
Dambyn Chagdarjav (executed)
Dogsomyn Bodoo (executed)
Khorloogiin Choibalsan
Dansranbilegiin Dogsom
Darizavyn Losol
Rinchingiin Elbegdorj

=== Persian Socialist Soviet Republic ===
Mirza Kuchik Khan
Ehsanollah Khan Dustdar

== White Movement ==
=== Russian Republic ===
Alexander Kerensky
Viktor Chernov
Nikolai Avksentiev
Aleksandr Verkhovsky
Simon Mikhailovich

=== Russian State ===
Alexander Kolchak (executed)
(Supreme Ruler of Russia)
Pyotr Vologodsky
Viktor Pepelyayev (executed)
Mikhail Smirnov
Vasily Boldyrev
Northwestern Army:
Nikolai Yudenich
(Commander-in-Chief)
Anton Dzerozhinsky
Alexander Rodzyanko
Peter von Glasenapp
Alexei Vandam
Fyodor Keller (executed)
Anatol von Lieven
Pavel Bermondt-Avalov
Aleksandr Dolgorukov
Northern Army:
Yevgeny Miller
(Commander-in-Chief)
Vladimir Marushevsky
Mikhail Kvetsinsky
Nikolai Tchaikovsky
Arctic Ocean Flotilla:
Leonid Ivanov
Boris Vilkitsky
Armed Forces of South Russia:
Anton Denikin
(Commander-in-Chief)
Vladimir May-Mayevsky #
Nikołaj Timanowski #
Ivan Romanovsky †
Alexander Lukomsky
Dmitry Shcherbachev
Mikhail Drozdovsky †
Nikolai Tretyakov †
Ignatiy Vasilchenko †
Viktor Betling #
Mikhail Rodzianko
Nikołaj Bredow
Abram Dragomirov
Vladimir Dragomirov
Vasily Flug
Konstantin Prisovskiy
Alexander Golubintzev
Yakov Yuzefovich
Pavel Chatilov
Viktor Pokrovsky
Black Sea Flotilla:
Vasily Kanin
Mikhail Sablin #
Dmitry Nenyukov
Andrei Pokrovsky
Nikolay Maksimov
Turkestan Army:
Ippolit Savitsky
Boris Kazanovich
Konstantin Osipov †
Konstantin Monstrov (executed)
Army of Wrangel:
Pyotr Wrangel
(Commander-in-Chief)
Alexander Krivoshein
Vladimir Vitkovsky
Alexander Kutepov
Petr Makhrov
Ivan Barbovich
Alexander Borovsky
Mikhail Fostikov
Nikolai Shilling
Wrangel's Fleet:
Mikhail Kedrov
People's Army of Komuch:
Vladimir Kappel #
Andrei Bakich (executed)
Konstantin Nechaev
Sergey Lyupov
Siberian Army:
Aleksey Grishin-Almazov †
Pavel Ivanov-Rinov
Alexey Matkovsky (executed)
Vladimir Gulidov (executed)
Boris Annenkov
Konstantin Sakharov
Mikhail Pleshkov
Ural Army:
Matvey Martynov †
Vladimir Akutin (executed)
Nikolay Saveliev
Vladimir Tolstov
Orenburg Independent Army:
Alexander Dutov †
Ivan Akulinin
Amur Front:
Ivan Kalmykov †
Women's Battalion:
Maria Bochkareva (executed)
Siberian Flotilla:
Sergey Timirev
Mikhail Berens
Georgy Stark

=== Volunteer Army ===
Kornilov Regiment
Lavr Kornilov †
(Commander-in-Chief)
Mikhail Alekseyev #
Sergey Markov †
Dmitri Miontxinski †
Mitrofan Nejentsev †
Vasily Simanovsky †

=== Don Army District ===
Alexey Kaledin †
Anatoly Nazarov (executed)
Vasily Tchernetzov †

=== Don Republic ===
Pyotr Krasnov
Afrikan Bogaevsky
Great Don Army:
Svyatoslav Denisov
Vladimir Sidorin
Pyotr Popov
Ivan Popov †
Konstantin Mamontov #
Alexander Fitzchelaurov
Fyodor Kryukov #
Emmanuel Semiletov #
Georgiy Kargalskov
Aleksandr Moller
Mikhail Bazavov
Mikhail Khripunov
Isaak Bykadorov
Konstantin Sychev

=== Kuban People's Republic ===
Alexander Filimonov
Nikolay Bukretov
Kuban Army:
Andrei Shkuro
Yakov Slashchov
Sergei Ulagay

=== Far Eastern Army ===
Grigory Semyonov
(Commander-in-Chief)
Sergey Rozanov
Boris Khreschatitsky
Nikolai Lokhvitsky
Grigory Verzhbitsky
Konstantin Akintievsky
Dmitry Semyonov
Anatoly Pepelyayev
Lev Vlasyevskiy
Mikhail Pleshkov
Georgy Matsievsky
Mikhail Korobeinikov
Asiatic Cavalry Division:
Roman von Ungern-Sternberg (executed)
Boris Rezukhin †

=== Provisional Priamurye Government ===
Mikhail Diterikhs - (Commander-in-Chief)
Nikolai Merkulov - Foreign Minister
Spiridon Merkulov - Chairman
Viktorin Molchanov - Army General
Innokenty Smolin
Faddey Glebov
Pyotr Blokhin

=== Czechoslovak Legion ===
Sergei Wojciechowski
Radola Gajda
Jan Syrový
Stanislav Čeček
Vladimir Shokorov

=== Alash Autonomy ===
Alikhan Bukeikhanov

=== Turkestan Autonomy ===
Mukhamedzhan Tynyshpaev
Mustafa Shokay

== Third party factions ==
=== Insurgent Army ===
Nestor Makhno
Semen Karetnyk (executed)
Fedir Shchus †
Dmitry Popov (executed)
Maria Nikiforova (executed)
Viktor Bilash
Lev Zadov
Ivan Markov
Iuda Grossman
Oleksiy Chubenko

=== Green Army ===
Nykyfor Hryhoriv †
Danylo Terpylo †
Pjotr Tokmakov †
Alexander Antonov †
Dmitry Antonov †
Ivan Kolesov †
Efim Mamontov †
Mikhail Kozyr
Konstantin Voskoboinik

=== Socialist-Revolutionary Party ===
Vladimir Volsky
Nikolai Avksentiev
Viktor Chernov
Fyodor Funtikov
Vladimir Zenzinov
Andrei Argunov
Piotr Derber
Yevgeny Rogovskiy
Boris Savinkov
Boris Donskoy (executed)
Nicholas Kalashnikoff
Radola Gajda

=== Left Socialist-Revolutionary Party ===
Maria Spiridonova
Yakov Blumkin
Boris Kamkov
Mark Natanson #
Dmitry Ivanovich Popov (executed)
Mikhail Artemyevich Muravyov †
Prosh Proshian #

=== Kronstadt Uprising ===
Stepan Petrichenko
Alexander Kozlovsky
Pavel Vilken

== Independence movements ==
=== Polish Republic ===
Józef Piłsudski
Ignacy Jan Paderewski
Polish Army:
Edward Rydz-Śmigły
Lucjan Żeligowski
Leonard Skierski
Władysław Sikorski
Jordan-Rozwadowski
Franciszek Latinik
Bolesław Roja
Blue Army:
Józef Haller

=== Finland ===
C.G.E. Mannerheim
Pehr Evind Svinhufvud
Karl Fredrik Wilkama
Hannes Ignatius
Ernst Linder
Ernst Löfström
Martin Wetzer
Hjalmar Frisell
Hans Kalm

=== Latvia ===
Jānis Čakste
Kārlis Ulmanis
Oskars Kalpaks †
Jānis Balodis

=== Estonia ===
Konstantin Päts
Andres Larka
Johan Laidoner
Ernst Põdder
Otto Strandman

=== Lithuania ===
Antanas Smetona
Aleksandras Stulginskis
Silvestras Žukauskas

=== Belarusian People's Republic ===
Jan Sierada
Pyotra Krecheuski
Jazep Losik
Vaclau Lastouski
Kyprian Kandratovich
Kastuś Jezavitaŭ
Anton Luckievich
Alés Harun #
Francišak Kušal
Paval Zhauryd
Bułak-Bałachowicz

=== Crimean People's Republic ===
Noman Çelebicihan (executed)
Cafer Qırımer

=== Democratic Republic of Georgia ===
Noe Ramishvili
Noe Zhordania
Giorgi Kvinitadze
Nikolay Chkheidze
Giorgi Mazniashvili

=== Democratic Republic of Armenia ===
Aram Manukian #
Hovhannes Kajaznuni
Alexander Khatisian
Hamo Ohanjanyan
Simon Vratsian
Tovmas Nazarbekian
Andranik Ozanian
Garegin Nzhdeh
Drastamat Kanayan
Movses Silikyan

=== Democratic Republic of Azerbaijan ===
Mammad Amin Rasulzadeh
Fatali Khan Khoyski †
Nasib Yusifbeyli †
Mammad Hasan Hajinski
Khosrow Sultanov
Samad Mehmandarov
Aliagha Shikhlinski

=== Qajar Iran ===
Ahmad Shah Qajar
Abdol Majid Mirza
Mohammad Taqi Pessian
Fathollah Khan Akbar

=== Ukrainian People's Republic ===
Central Rada of Ukraine:
Mykhailo Hrushevsky
Directorate of Ukraine:
Volodymyr Vynnychenko
Symon Petliura
Ukrainian Army:
Mykola Porsh
Ivan Nemolovsky
Oleksandr Zhukovsky
Petro Bolbochan (executed)
Zurab Natiev
Oleksander Hrekov
Vsevolod Petriv
Yevhen Konovalets
Mykola Yunakiv
Volodymyr Salsky
Oleksandr Udovychenko
Mykola Kapustiansky
Sergei Delwig
Iwan Omelianowicz-Pawlenko
Yuriy Tyutyunnyk
Vasyl Tyutyunnyk #
Galician Army:
Myron Tarnavsky
Mykhailo Omelianovych-Pavlenko
Osip Mikitka (executed)
Dmytro Vitovsky †
Antin Kraws
Archduke Wilhelm
Ukrainian Navy:
Sviatoslav Shramchenko
Wołodymyr Sawczenko-Bilski
Mikhail Belinsky †
Far Eastern Ukrainian Army:
Yuri Hlushko-Mova

=== Ukrainian State ===
Pavlo Skoropadskyi
Alexander Ragoza (executed)

=== Emirate of Bukhara ===
Mohammed Alim Khan

=== Khanate of Khiva ===
Isfandiyar Khan (executed)
Sayid Abdullah
Junaid Khan

=== Basmachi Movement ===
Enver Pasha †
Selim Pasha
Ibrahim Bek
Muhiddinbek (executed)
Mandamin Bek (executed)
Irgash Bey
Faizal Maksum

=== Mongolia ===
Bogd Khan

== Allied Expeditionary Forces ==
=== United States ===
William S. Graves
George E. Stewart
Robert L. Eichelberger

=== British Empire ===
Edmund Ironside
Alfred Knox
Frederick Poole
Wilfrid Malleson
Frederick Bailey
Lionel Dunsterville
James H. Elmsley

=== France ===
Maurice Janin
Louis d'Espèrey
Henri Berthelot
Philippe d'Anselme

=== Empire of Japan ===
Otani Kikuzo
Yui Mitsue

=== Greece ===
Konstantinos Nider

=== Romania ===
Ernest Broșteanu

== Central Powers intervention ==
=== German Empire ===
Paul von Hindenburg
Erich Ludendorff
Max Hoffmann
Rüdiger von der Goltz
Hermann von Eichhorn †
Robert Kosch
Friedrich von Kressenstein
Alfred Fletcher
Josef Bischoff
Walter von Eberhardt

=== Austria-Hungary ===
Conrad von Hötzendorf
A. A. von Straußenburg

=== Ottoman Empire ===
Nuri Pasha
Mürsel Bey
Kâzım Karabekir
Cevat Çobanlı
Muzaffer Kılıç
