= Central Asian Front of the Russian Civil War =

Military theater of the Russian Civil War

Central Asian Theater of the Russian Civil War
- Part of the Russian Civil War
- Map of Soviet Central Asia in 1922
Date	1916–1934
Location	Turkestan, Transcaspian Region, Central Asia
Result	Bolshevik victory; (see § Aftermath)
Territorial changes	Soviet control established in Central Asia

Belligerents
(Russian Soviet Federative Socialist Republic) Soviet Russia; Soviet Bukhara; Soviet Khorezm	White Movement: Transcaspian Government; Peasant Army of Fergana; British Empire: British Indian Expeditionary Forces; (French Third Republic) France: French Expeditionary Forces; Basmachi rebels Turkestan Autonomy; Alash Autonomy; Khanate of Khiva; Emirate of Bukhara

Commanders and leaders
Mikhail Frunze; Vasily Blyukher; Mikhail Tukhachevsky; Nikolai Kakurin	Brigadier-General D. M. Malleson; Oraz Sirdar; Alexander Dutov; Enver Pasha †; Ibrahim Bek †; Konstantin Monstrov †; Muhammad Alim Khan

Strength
Unknown	Unknown

Casualties and losses
Unknown	Unknown

The Central Asian Theatre was the front of the Russian Civil War taking place in the old imperial provinces of Turkestan, Khiva, Bukhara, and Transcaspia.

== Alash Orda ==
In late 1917, a revolutionary wave spread across Russia, including Kazakhstan, leading to the establishment of Soviet power there. However, this was met with opposition, and in June 1918, with the help of the Czechoslovak Legion, the Alash Army (the armed forces of the Alash Autonomy) took over Kazakhstan. After Kolchak's coup, relations between the Alash and the Whites became uneasy, and in March, negotiations between the Alash and the Bolsheviks began. The topic of discussion was about aligning with the Bolsheviks, and by December, they fully switched to the Soviet side. By early 1930, most of their leaders were arrested.

== Revolutions in the Protectorates ==
After the initial shockwaves of the Russian revolution reached Central Asia, the local khans rebelled against their ruling governments. This was met by fierce resistance in both Khiva and Bukhara. These revolutions sparked a greater revolution resulting in the creations of other revolutionary governments such as the Alash Autonomy and Turkestan.

The revolutions were driven by a mix of socialist ideals and a desire for self-rule. In Turkestan, Bolshevik promises of land redistribution gained traction among peasants, while Kazakh intellectuals in the Alash Orda sought greater autonomy for their people. However, these movements faced significant challenges, including ethnic divisions, resistance from local elites, and external pressures from the Russian Civil War and the advancing Red Army.

== Guerrilla warfare in Turkestan ==
The Basmachi rebellion formally began in 1916, sparked by Russian efforts to conscript Central Asian Muslims into military service during World War I. The resistance escalated after the October Revolution of 1917, when Soviet forces tried to assert control over Turkestan. The movement consisted of various factions—some led by religious figures, others by tribal chieftains or former officials of the old regime—each resisting the Bolsheviks for different reasons.

The rebels saw initial success allying with Bukhara to prevent a pro Bolshevik coup d'etat. The movement spread rapidly across the Fergana Valley, Dushanbe, Khiva, and other regions, becoming a significant threat to Soviet control in Central Asia. While the movement lacked a cohesive structure and unified leadership, many see Ibrahim Bek and later on Enver Pasha as the leaders of the movement.

== Struggle for Dushanbe ==
One of the pivotal moments in the struggle was the successful siege of Dushanbe by Basmachi forces under the leadership of Enver Pasha, a former Ottoman officer who had joined the anti-Soviet struggle in Central Asia. Pasha rallied Basmachi fighters with the vision of creating a united Turkic-Islamic state, and his military leadership reinvigorated the insurgency. The Basmachi managed to capture Dushanbe in February of 1922, but their control was short-lived.

By the July 1922, Soviet forces regrouped and launched a counteroffensive to retake the town. The successful pushback, dealt a significant blow to the Basmachi movement. Enver Pasha attempted to continue the fight but was eventually killed in a skirmish near Balkh in 1922, marking the beginning of the end for the Basmachis.

== British Indian Intervention in Transcaspia ==
The Malleson Mission was a British military intervention in Central Asia during the Russian Civil War, aimed at countering the spread of Bolshevism and protecting British interests in India. Led by Major General Wilfrid Malleson, the mission began in 1918 with the deployment of British Indian Army troops to the city of Meshed in Persia (modern-day Iran). The primary objective was to support the anti-Bolshevik forces in the region, particularly in Transcaspia (now Turkmenistan), and to secure the northern frontiers of British India from potential Bolshevik influence. The British feared that Soviet control of Central Asia could lead to instability in nearby Afghanistan and India.

Malleson coordinated with local anti-Bolshevik factions, including the Transcaspian Government, a provisional authority established by Mensheviks and Social Revolutionaries in the region. His forces provided logistical and military support, including supplies, weapons, and training, to help these groups resist the Bolshevik Red Army. One of the key engagements of the mission was the defense of Ashgabat (then known as Ashkhabad), where Malleson’s troops played a crucial role in stabilizing the front against Bolshevik advances. The victory at Dushak secured the supply lines to the Caspian Sea.

However, the mission faced significant challenges, including internal divisions, logistical difficulties, and shifting political priorities in London. By 1919, with the conclusion of World War I and growing public and political pressure in Britain to reduce overseas military commitments, the British government decided to withdraw its support from the region. The Malleson Mission ended in 1919, and shortly thereafter, the Bolsheviks consolidated their control over Transcaspia.

== Aftermath ==
By the 1921, the Soviet Union had achieved dominance over Central Asia. The Red Army systematically dismantled the Basmachi Movement and established control over key territories in Turkestan, Bukhara, and Khiva. The Soviet strategy combined military force with diplomatic efforts to co-opt local leaders and undermine resistance. The use of brutal tactics, including scorched-earth policies and mass reprisals against villages suspected of harboring rebels, helped to consolidate Soviet power in the region but also caused many deaths from the famines that followed.

The final phase of Soviet consolidation came with the formal incorporation of Central Asian territories into the USSR. By 1924, the Soviet government had established the Central Asian Soviet Republics, including Uzbekistan, Turkmenistan, Tajikistan, and Kyrgyzstan, effectively integrating them into the Soviet system. This process involved the suppression of local autonomy, the imposition of Soviet policies. The successful conquest and incorporation of Central Asia marked a significant achievement for the Soviet regime, securing its old imperial lands borders and extending its influence across its vast southern frontier.

== See also ==
- Bibliography of the Russian Revolution and Civil War
- Outline of the Russian Revolution and Civil War
- Index of articles related to the Russian Revolution and Civil War
- List of states and regions involved in the Russian Civil War
- The "Russian" Civil Wars, 1916–1926: Ten Years That Shook the World
- Russia in Flames: War, Revolution, Civil War, 1914–1921
- Russia in Revolution: An Empire in Crisis, 1890 to 1928
- Russia: Revolution and Civil War, 1917—1921
- The Russian Revolution: A New History

== See also ==
- Southern Front of the Russian Civil War
- Eastern Front of the Russian Civil War
- Central Asian revolt of 1916
