= Mae Fah Luang Foundation =

Thai foundation

- มูลนิธิแม่ฟ้าหลวง
- Abbreviation: MFLF
- Formation: April 26, 1972; 54 years ago
- Type: NGO
- Headquarters: Pathum Wan District, Bangkok, Thailand
- Region served: Asia
- Honorary president: Princess Maha Chakri Sirindhorn
- Key people: Mom Rajawongse Disnadda Diskul, Chairman
- Staff: 1700
- Website: maefahluang.org
- Formerly called: Thai Hill Crafts Foundation

The Mae Fah Luang Foundation (Thai: มูลนิธิแม่ฟ้าหลวง; RTGS: munnithi mae fa luang) (MFLF) is a private, non‐profit organization established to improve the quality of life of people in poverty and deprived of opportunities. It manages numerous projects in Thailand as well as other countries in Asia. The foundation's mission focuses on three main areas: “improving social and economic development, preserving the environment, and supporting local art and culture.”

In 1972, Her Royal Highness Princess Srinagarindra (Princess Mother), grandmother of the present King of Thailand, Vajiralongkorn, founded the Hill Crafts Foundation to offer market access for craft-making villages in the northern highlands. It was renamed the Mae Fah Luang Foundation in 1985, after the name given to the princess mother by the ethnic minorities, 'royal mother from the sky'. The new name indicated the growing scope of social development efforts the foundation was assuming based on the ideas and philosophy of the princess mother.

In 1988, the MFLF initiated its flagship project, the Doi Tung Development Project, on Doi Tung in Chiang Rai, with the goal of providing people with sustainable livelihoods. The MFLF developed the Sustainable Alternative Livelihood Development (SALD) model, which emphasizes understanding the needs of the local people and their socio-geographical realities, as well as integration and involvement of all levels. This model has been replicated in its projects in Thailand, Myanmar, Afghanistan, and Indonesia.

== History ==
The Mae Fah Luang Foundation (MFLF) was founded in 1972 by Princess Srinagarindra as the Thai Hill Crafts Foundation under the Royal Patronage of Her Royal Highness. The Hill Crafts Foundation addressed the problem of poverty and poor living conditions faced by the ethnic minority groups in northern Thailand by promoting and marketing their handicrafts to supplement their income, as well as teaching them skills and disciplines such as Thai language, basic math, and health education at Rai Mae Fah Luang in Chiang Rai (today known as the Mae Fah Luang Art and Culture Park). In 1985, the Thai Hill Crafts Foundation was renamed the Mae Fah Luang Foundation under the Royal Patronage of Her Royal Highness the Princess Mother, as it initiated more extensive rural development projects.

The MFLF undertook its first comprehensive development project, the Doi Tung Development Project, in 1988 at Doi Tung to tackle opium cultivation at its root: poverty and lack of opportunity. The project aimed to create self-sufficient communities that would become independent of external support and well equipped to adapt to the changing environment. Today, this work is known as the SALD model.

The Hall of Opium, an exhibition hall, was established in 2003 to educate people about illicit drugs, especially opiates, in order to reduce drug abuse. With the development of the Doi Tung area and easier access to schooling opportunities, the Rai Mae Fah Luang, which previously offered boarding and education facilities to ethnic children, was transformed into the Mae Fah Luang Art and Cultural Park in 2008, in line with its mission to preserve and support local art and culture.

The MFLF has continued to expand its efforts in supporting vulnerable communities in Thailand and internationally, playing an important role as an intermediary between state and private organizations. The subsequent projects target the root causes of poverty by addressing areas of health, livelihood, and education based on the identified best practices from the Doi Tung Development Project, as well as the development philosophy of the princess mother.

== Flagship projects ==
=== Doi Tung Development Project (1988-2017) ===
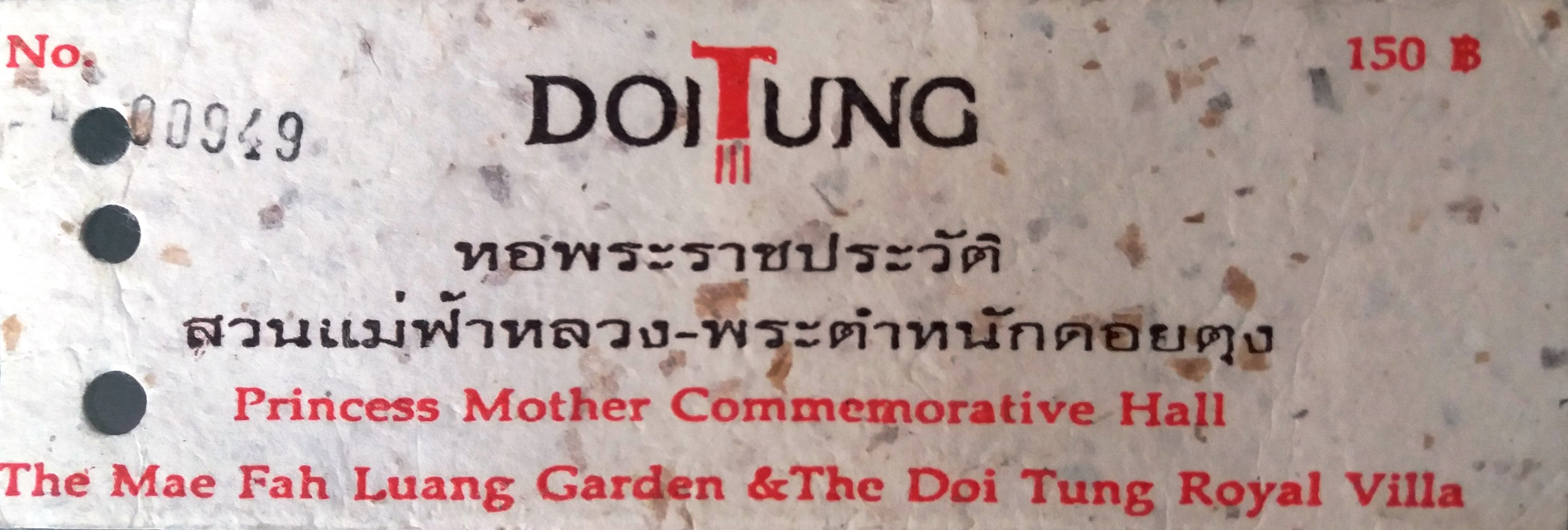
Ticket to Doi Tung

The Doi Tung Development Project (DTDP) started in 1988, covering approximately 15,000 hectares of the Doi Tung area, in the Golden Triangle, a major region of opium production, impacting 11,000 people in 29 villages. This mountainous watershed area had been subject to slash-and-burn cultivation, opium cultivation, and trafficking of both human and arms. The project aimed to resolve problems faced by locals, from lack of health care, education, and governmental support, over a span of 30 years (1988–2017), in three phases:

Phase I (1988–1993): This phase ensured the basic necessities of life, providing basic health care, including drug rehabilitation, developing infrastructures such as roads and reservoirs, and reforesting the area. Schools, health care centers, and a cottage industry training center were built. New crops, such as coffee and macadamia, were introduced to replace opium.

Phase II (1994–2002): The second phase focused on creating a sustainable model through which the locals could generate income and become self-sufficient by establishing occupational development centers for agriculture, agro-processing, handicrafts, and tourism. The Doi Tung brand was created to serve as the main channel of income to finance social activities of the DTDP. It includes four business units: food, handicrafts, horticulture, and tourism. The DTDP became financially self-sustainable by 2001 through the Doi Tung brand. It has now established over 20 cafes and stores throughout Thailand. Its products range from coffee and macadamia to clothes, housewares, and stationery.

Phase III (2003–2017): This phase is about strengthening the business units and to make sure that income-generating entities are stabilized. This final phase prepares to transfer the management of the DTDP from the MFLF to the local people by emphasizing the training of human resources

In 2003, the UN Office on Drugs and Crime (UNODC) recognized the DTDP as one of the world's best examples of alternative development.

In 2009, the Secretary General of the MFLF received the Schwab Foundation's "Social Entrepreneur of the Year for the Region of East Asia" for the MFLF's efforts in combating social problems and improving people's quality of life while restoring the natural environment.

In 2012, the DTDP partnered with the housewares company, IKEA, to create the Allvarlig tableware collection. In 2013, Ikea entered into a partnership with Doi Tung to produce ceramics, tableware, and mulberry paper sold in the limited edition collections Annanstans and Hantverk.

==== Accomplishments ====
- A 1,000-day Rehabilitation Program was carried out from 1991 to 1994, to assist the nearly 500 residents addicted to opiates. It had a relapse rate of about 15%. After the program ended, drug rehabilitation became the responsibility of the local communities, with assistance from the project.
- Forest coverage has increased from 42% of total project area of about 15,000 hectares to over 90%. Opium is no longer grown.
- In 1989, the average local income was US$120 per person per year. In 2011, the number had increased to almost US$1,400 per person per year. On average, each household earns about US$9,150 a year.
- Total income from agricultural land has increased about three-fold from US$388,889 in 1988 to about US$1.2 million in 2007, although the total agricultural area was reduced from 58% to approximately 11% (replaced mainly by reforestation).
- Thai citizenship has been granted to 76% of the population, up from only 38% in 1992.
- In 1992, 56% of the population was illiterate and only 0.2% had college degrees. Today, the number of college or university graduates has increased from 18 to 528 people. The majority of the new generation goes to schools in the project area.

=== Mae Fah Luang Art and Cultural Park ===
In 1979, the Thai Hill Crafts Foundation, with cooperation from various international organizations including the United States Agency for International Development (USAID), established a youth leadership program to equip ethnic minority children with basic education and social skills, training them in agriculture, craftsmanship, and leadership. The training program was conducted at Rai Mae Fah Luang, which is now the Mae Fah Luang Art and Culture Park.

The Rai Mae Fah Luang became a home to hundreds of youths from rural areas with no access to education so that they could attend schools in the city. The role of the Rai Mae Fah Luang as an educational institution came to an end when the DTDP established schools in the vicinity of their villages.

Today, the area has been transformed into the Mae Fah Luang Art and Culture Park, housing the region's largest collection of Lan Na arts, including the teak wood exhibition, a botanical collection, and the Golden Pavilion that the people of Chiang Rai built and presented to the princess mother in honor of her 84th birthday.

=== Hall of Opium ===
The Hall of Opium was created to reduce the demand for drugs through knowledge and education. While the DTDP tackles the drug problems from the supply side, this centre tries to solve drug problems from the demand side. A result of almost 10 years of research, the exhibition at the Hall of Opium conveys the history of opium and its trade across the globe, as well as provides a comprehensive source of knowledge on opium, opiates, and other narcotics. The exhibition also presents current issues regarding the efforts to control drugs and the impacts of drug abuse, with the belief that education can deter drug abuse.

== The SALD Model ==
The Sustainable Alternative Livelihood Development (SALD) model of MFLF emerged from the experience of the Doi Tung Development Project. It places the local community at the center of their own development, promoting economic, environmental, and social growth by building a strong community driven by local wisdom. The people-centric model uses a holistic approach that addresses health, livelihood, and education needs. It emphasizes local ownership and leadership to nurture independence to prepare the locals to continue on their own development regardless of external assistance.

The model follows four general stages:

- Initial preparation of the development team
  - Gain support from all the parties of interest—government officials, the private sector and the community—ensuring that they agree on the goals, and are committed.
  - Build a facilitation team that will coordinate the resources, such as fundings, among relevant parties, as well as make sure that the ideas generated will be the basis for discussions with the communities.
- Preparation of the community
  - This step is geared toward building trust through communication and implementation of programs addressing immediate needs, known as the “Quick Hit”, usually concerning healthcare and food.
  - The foundation seeks to ensure that the community members are prepared and eager to get involved with the projects by getting them to understand their own problems and needs, how to address them, and the benefits of doing so.
- Implementation
  - The implementation process continues building confidence and motivating people by working hand-in-hand with them, often creating incentives (such as improved livestock, access to irrigation and value-added products) for them. Here, the ideas are carried out through a learning-by-doing process and incorporating local wisdom.
  - In the next phase, the MFLF aims to create market driven value-chains by employing practices used in professional business, building on local capacity.
- Exit (this stage focuses on the following objectives to make sure that the community is self-sufficient and can continue with their own development)
  - The establishment of rules and regulations within the community
  - Allocate duties and responsibilities among locals to address future needs
  - Provide additional knowledge if needed

== Domestic Outreach ==
=== Pang Mahan Reforestation Project (2005-2008) ===
Key partners: Siam Commercial Bank PLC, Chaipattana Foundation

The Pang Mahan Reforestation Project covers 2,250 hectares and is home to six ethnic minority groups in 18 villages, totaling about 7,600 people. This CSR initiative centers on reforestation as a means to poverty alleviation and sustainable development, becoming the first domestic outreach project that utilized and adapted the foundation's SALD approach.

At Pang Mahan, the MFLF planted multiple variants of native plants, a method known as "assisted tree regeneration", improving on lessons learned at Doi Tung where the method of monoculture reforestation involved clearcutting any remaining trees before replanting. The MFLF implemented other mechanisms to support the preservation of forests, like establishing community regulations among locals to prevent forest fires, as well as creating a gas fund to promote cooking with gas instead of firewood.

Additionally, an extensive irrigation system was constructed. An "economic forest", reserved for long-term plantings of crops for profit, i.e., tea trees, and a "sustenance forest", intended for everyday use, i.e., bamboo for food and construction, were designated. In addition, a seed bank and a livestock bank were set up to reduce daily expenses and provide the community with supplementary income.

The average income per family in the 18 villages increased from 18,611 baht per family per in 2004 to 97,882 baht in 2008. Forests were restored and biodiversity in the area was revived. Most importantly, locals became leaders in development.

=== Puna Reforestation Project (2006-present) ===
Key partner: Chaipattana Foundation

At Puna, the earlier reforestation models at Doi Tung and Pang Mahan were refined to become the Natural Tree Regeneration method or “reforestation without planting.” This method can be used when the soil has not been completely destroyed or demineralized over an extended period of time from chemical use, and there are still trees in the area.

In the project area of 3900 hectares, no new trees were planted. The project focused on land zoning and land management. Instead, the forest is left alone so it could regenerate itself. The reserve forest was protected from grazing, forest fires, and human interference. As in Pang Mahan, sustenance and economic forestry zones promoting bamboo, banana, and tea oil were implemented to provide livelihood.

The average income per family increased from about US$750 to US$2,400 per family per year within three years.

=== Integrated Rural Livelihood Development Model in Nan (2009-2011) ===
Key partner: Royal Initiative Discovery Institute

The development in Nan Province spanned three districts: Tha Wang Pha District, Song Khwae District, and Chaloem Phra Kiat District, covering a total of 21 villages. The watershed in Nan Province contributes to as much as 45% of the water that flows into the Chao Phraya River, yet the villages face problems of drought in the summer and severe flooding and landslides during the rainy season. The local communities relied on slash-and-burn cultivation and high levels of chemical pesticides and fertilizers to cope with land shortages on the steep slopes. The communities had problems of poverty and one village was 17 million baht in debt at the start of the project as the villagers often had to borrow money to buy food or take out loans for agricultural production.

With help and labor from the locals, the MFLF worked to maximize the use of the existing irrigation system, making repairs as well as building new check dams, weirs, and reservoirs to direct water to agricultural plots. The locals took ownership of construction works and were later equipped with the knowledge to carry out subsequent maintenance necessary. This improved system of weirs and canals has allowed farmers to grow rice at least twice a year as well as post-harvest crops. The project introduced terraced rice paddy fields to deal with the problem of demineralized soil and land shortages, increasing productivity, and reducing the use of forestland. A bank of economic plants was founded to provide locals with seedlings such as sugar palm, rattan, and eagle wood. This not only reforested the area, helping to prevent further soil erosion, but also created long-term income.

In addition, a livestock bank providing comprehensive services, from husbandry knowledge to feed and medicine and livestock management, was set up, helping to build capacity for local youths. This livestock bank has reduced economic vulnerability since the villagers raise these livestock as food, and earn extra income from selling extra meat.

The ownership of the project was handed to the local community in 2011 and village committees were established to manage each different area.

=== Huay Klai Sustainable Water Management Project in Udon Thani (2011-present) ===
Key partners: Chaipattana Foundation; Royal Initiative Discovery Institute; Model Farm Project at Her Majesty the Queen's Initiative of the Northeast Region; Ministry of Interior; Udon Thani Provincial Administration

The project in Nong Wua So District of Udon Thani Province focuses on the underutilized Huay Klai Reservoir as the main subject. Huay Klai Reservoir is an example of rural development that lacks integration among responsible governmental agencies. The primary survey showed that the reservoir was in perfect condition, yet communities in the vicinity could not fully benefit from it since there was no proper water distribution system.

Working with the local administration and local people, the MFLF created a new water distribution system, while the Model Farm piloted two model cultivation plots in the village, whose techniques are now used in over 150 more plots. The locals were given vegetable seeds, taught about soil utility, multi-storey cropping, and tending to livestock. They have become self-reliant, consuming and earning income from their own agricultural products instead of having to buy them. With the increase in income and work opportunity, the locals are able to remain in the area to earn a living instead of having to find work in other areas and overseas.

== International Outreach ==
Doi Tung has proved to be a model for development efforts around the globe.

=== Yong Kha, Shan State, Myanmar (2002-2004) ===
Key partners: Government of Thailand; Government of Myanmar

Like the people in Doi Tung, the locals in Yong Kha had also been dependent on opium cultivation as a source of income. Many of the 6,022 locals were facing health problems such as malaria, tuberculosis, scabies, malnutrition, and other common diseases.

Here, the first outreach project replicating the SALD model was carried out, first by providing health care by Thai mobile medical units to address their immediate needs. Fourteen locals were trained to diagnose and treat malaria, tuberculosis, and common diseases to expand the local health care capacity. Within a year, there was zero mortality from malaria and the infection rate reduced from 20% to 2% in three years.

Identified by the local people as significant priorities, a 16-bed hospital and a school for 500 students were built by local workers. A small-scale irrigation system was built by the community to aid growing sustenance and cash crops all year round. A seed bank and a pig bank were also set up. Children were taught a formal curriculum as well as practical agricultural skills in the school's vegetable plot, chicken coop, and fishpond.

After three years, the total investment in this project amounted to US$640,000 (US$106 per person per year). It generated benefits to the community in cash and in kind equivalent to US$704,574 (US$117 per person per year).

The project ended in 2004 due to changes in the government of Myanmar but development activities continued under local staffing.

=== Balkh, Afghanistan (2006-2012) ===
Key Partners: The Government of Afghanistan The Afghan Ministry for Rural Rehabilitation and Development (MRRD) The Afghan Ministry of Agriculture, Irrigation, and Livestock (MAIL) The Provincial Government of Balkh Province Thailand International Cooperation Agency (TICA) The Government of Belgium Ministry of Development Cooperation The Royal Danish Government

The A4 Sheep Bank Project (A4SB) is a six-year project carried out by the MFLF in cooperation with the Ministry of Rural Rehabilitation and Development of Afghanistan (MRRD) and the Provincial Government of Balkh, together with the local community. The A4 Sheep Bank (A4SB) project reaches out to almost 500 households in 15 villages in Dehdadi and Nahr-e-shahe districts, Balkh Province. The goal of the project is to revive the Afghan Karakul sheep industry in order to strengthen rural livelihood, improve income and pave the way towards the creation of small to medium enterprises (SMEs) adding value to sheep by-products. The A4SB received initial funding from the Belgian Government, followed by the Royal Thai Government and MRRD's National Area Based Development Program (NABDP), and most recently, from the Danish Embassy in Afghanistan through MRRD's Afghanistan Rural Enterprise Development Program (AREDP).

The project trained local Afghan youths as para-veterinarians to operate a subscription-based Mobile Veterinary Unit. The subscribing sheep owners provide payment for the veterinary services in the form of livestock, which is then used in a sheep-loan system, or A4 Sheep Bank. The Sheep Bank lends sheep to economically vulnerable farmers, with the goal of reducing poverty and deterring them from illicit activities like opium poppy cultivation. The farmers repay the loans with the sheep's offspring, which can then be loaned to other farmers, creating a revolving fund.

Over the past five years, the A4 Sheep Bank Project has achieved significant results- reducing economic vulnerability and promoting community-based economic participation, allowing Afghan sheep owners themselves to assist poorer fellow Afghans. The accumulated economic impact for 464 beneficiary households in 15 villages - from the reduced livestock mortality rates, increased sheep offspring for the 287 registered sheep owners, and sheep loans provided to 177 economically vulnerable households - approximates over US$1,890,000 in 2012. In addition, the improved quantity and quality of sheep provide a larger raw material pool to capture further downstream value-adding opportunities and lead towards the development of related community-based enterprises.

The A4 Sheep Bank Project is currently in its last phase. The project is working to support the transition of the mobile veterinary unit into a privatized business as well as assist sheep owners to form enterprise groups involved in trading live sheep, pelts, skins and wool. In addition, a wool-processing and yarn-spinning project will be established in order to create immediate employment opportunities and income for Afghan women to work from their homes. The production of high-quality handspun yarn would be able to add value to sheared sheep wool and link into other downstream industries such as textile, carpets and handicrafts, generating further income and job prospects.

=== Aceh, Indonesia (2006-2012) ===
Key Partners: The Government of Thailand Thailand International Cooperation Agency (TICA) The Government of Indonesia National Narcotics Board of Indonesia (BNN) Office of the Governor of Aceh Provincial Health Office of Aceh The United Nations Office on Drugs and Crime (UNODC) Sambinoe Foundation

The MFLF was approached by the UNODC and the Government of Indonesia to help solve the problem of cannabis cultivation by creating other possible livelihood activities to alleviate poverty using the SALD approach. The project sought to double the income per capita from less than US$1 to more than US$2 per day for the target population who have endured 30 years of civil conflict and the 2004 tsunami.

In 2007, the MFLF piloted the Malaria Management Program in Lamteuba Village Cluster, with a population of approximately 4,700, training the local health team to carry out malaria treatment, from diagnosis to treatment and prevention. The program successfully reduced the infection rate to less than 0.05% in an area where malaria had been endemic. The program has since extended assistance to other areas in Indonesia, including capacity building for over 1,000 midwives and health technicians. Lamteuba is now a model of malaria management, providing knowledge to people from government organizations and academic institutions. In 2012, the MFLF local malaria team started a malaria management program in Aceh Jaya District, another area in Aceh where malaria is endemic, in cooperation with the Provincial Health of Office of Aceh, local health authorities and community representatives.

The MFLF, in cooperation with the Prostheses Foundation of the princess mother in Chiang Mai, Thailand trained four Acehnese amputees on low-cost and effective prostheses production in 2007. The Foundation then aided in establishing an Achenese operated Prostheses Center at the Zainoel Abidin Hospital in Banda Aceh, where artificial limbs are produced for those who have lost their limbs, mainly from the political conflict or tsunami disaster.

In December 2008, with Sambinoe Foundation and the local Government of Aceh, the MFLF established the "Sustainable Rural Development Centre" in Maheng-Lamcot Village, Aceh Besar District as a one-stop learning and demonstration centre on irrigation, agriculture, livestock, and basic value adding initiatives. Over three years, the various development activities, including the goat farm, seed banks, vegetable cultivation plots, and rice mill, have brought about an increase in income for the community of Maheng-Lamcot from an average of 83 US cents to US$2.70 per person per day.

=== Yenan Chaung Township, Magwe Region, Myanmar (2010-Present) ===
Key Partners: Livestock Breeding and Veterinary Department (LBVD) of the Ministry of Livestock and Fisheries of Myanmar Thailand International Development Cooperation Agency (TICA) Office of the Narcotics Control Board of Thailand (ONCB)

Yenan Chaung Township is one of the least developed townships in Magwe Region, which has a population of about 150,000. The people in the region suffer from insufficient water both for household consumption and agricultural cultivation- having limited sources of ground water and relying almost solely on rain for growing crops. They mostly plant beans and sesame since there is not enough water to grow rice. They utilize their livestock for work, transportation and to sell for cash. For additional income, the locals cut down trees to sell as logs and coals, as well as leave the area to find work.

During 2011–2012, the MFLF worked in 16 villages in 4 village tracts covering approximately 2,000 household beneficiaries or 9,370 people, with the possibility to extend to a wider area. The project first started by setting up an anti-venom serum bank, since there was a serious problem with snake bites and lack of serum access, resulting in preventable deaths. Secondly, the Foundation worked with the community on developing water resources- including installing hand pumps, digging new wells, and repairing and building reservoirs and weirs. In the process, the locals learned how to care for these water systems.

A goat bank, as well as para-veterinary training and services, complemented by livestock medicine funds, were set up to increase assets and income for the people. In addition, the MFLF established a seed bank to allow the villagers easier access to cultivation inputs. The MFLF is also helping to develop alternative energy sources - including biogas from cattle manure as well as solar power for lighting in order to help reduce expenses and promote a healthier lifestyle for the villagers.

Basic value addition to local agriculture produce is also being introduced in order to educate villagers on basic entrepreneurial skills and lead to more long-term and sustainable income for the community.
