= Enver Pasha's Rebellion =

1921–22 anti-Bolshevik campaign in Turkestan

- Part of the Basmachi Movement
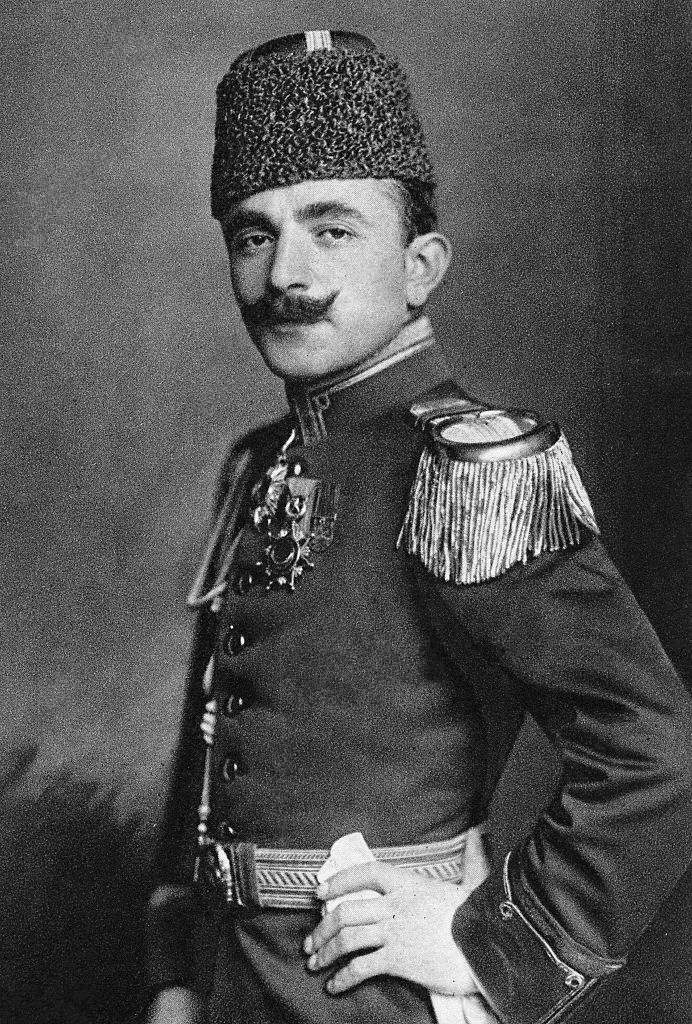
- Enver Pasha, leader of the rebellion
| Date | November 1921 – 4 August 1922 |
| Location | Turkestan |
| Result | Bolshevik victory |
| Territorial changes | Bolsheviks solidify their power in the region |

Belligerents
| Russian SFSR; Soviet Bukhara | Basmachi Movement | |
| Russian SFSR; Soviet Bukhara | Pro-Enver Basmachi (after June 1922) | Anti-Enver Basmachi (after June 1922) |

Commanders and leaders
| Sergey Kamenev; Yakov Melkumov; Nikolai Kakurin; Sergo Ordzhonikidze | Enver Pasha †; Davlatman Bek †; Faizal Maksum; Yusif Ziya Talibzadeh | Ibrahim Bek; Korşirmat |

Casualties and losses
| Heavy | As much as 4,000 | |

Enver Pasha's Rebellion (Uzbek: Enver poshoning qo'zg'oloni) refers to an armed uprising that was a part of the much larger Basmachi Revolt. It was conducted by the former Ottoman Minister of War, Enver Pasha.

The uprising started in the summer of 1921 when Enver Pasha arrived in Bukhara to negotiate with the Basmachi. He ended up defecting to the Basmachi and began fighting the Bolsheviks. During this period of the Basmachi movement, they reached their peak, but by May 1922, with the start of Bolshevik counteroffensives in Turkestan, the Basmachi began to fall apart. By mid-June, Ibrahim Bek revolted against Enver, sparking a civil conflict that divided the Basmachi. The rebellion was ultimately crushed by August 4, 1922, when Enver Pasha himself was killed.

== Background ==
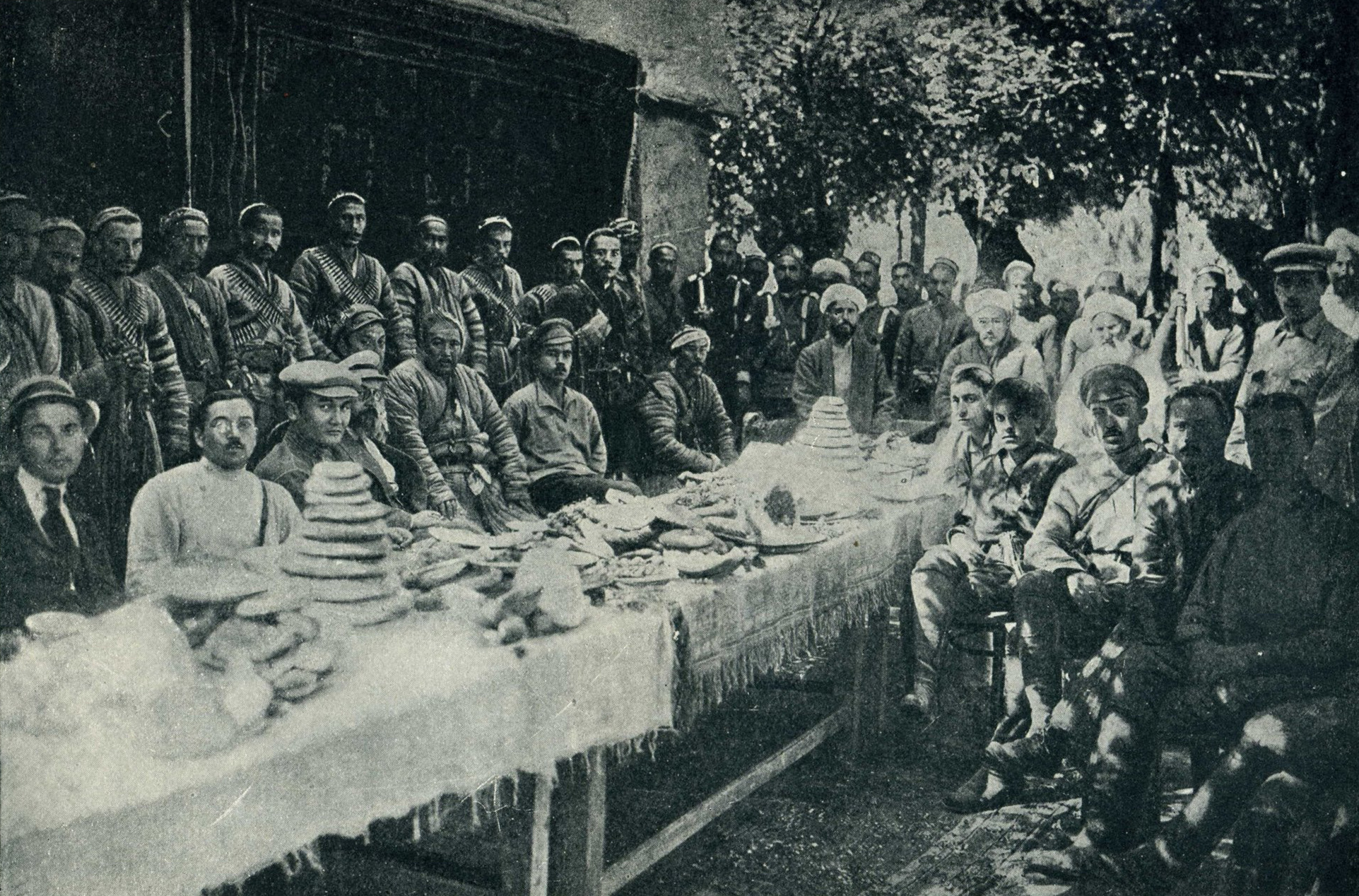
Negotiations with basmachi in 1921

After the end of World War One, Enver Pasha, along with Djemal Pasha and Talaat Pasha, fled to Germany, where he had to change his identity to 'Ali Bey' due to a military tribunal in Istanbul sentencing the Young Turk trio to death. In 1919, he met with Karl Radek, a representative of the Comintern in Berlin, who offered him a new future—leading the Red Army against the Basmachi. In early 1920, Enver Pasha traveled to Moscow, where he worked for the Society for the Unity of the Revolution with Islam. He promised a marriage between Islam and Communism, aiming to establish a Communist-Muslim union, and pledged to stop the Basmachi and turn them to their side. In June 1921, he arrived in Bukhara with some representatives and officers. He was offered the post of Minister of War in the Bukharan Government but he rejected this proposal, he executed the captured men there, thereby starting his rebellion.

== The uprising ==
Enver Pasha soon found his ideas of Muslim socialism popular among the farmers and working class of Eastern Bukhara, but this led to him being shunned by the nobility and many of the Kurbashi. The nobility indirectly supported Ibrahim Bek over Enver, laying the groundwork for a civil conflict between the two. This culminated in Enver Pasha being disarmed and captured during a meeting with Ibrahim Bek. He was later released by the Emir of Bukhara, Seyyid Alim, who appointed him as naib (deputy). In his new position, Enver attempted to gather arms from countries hostile to the local Bolshevik presence, with Afghanistan and the United Kingdom being the most notable, as both were eager to send him supplies. However, the Bolsheviks prevented this and blockaded Bukhara. Despite these setbacks, Enver started his campaign with 20,000 soldiers. His first victory was in Dushanbe, which he successfully captured after a month-long siege. Although they attempted to open the border with China to end the blockade however they failed, He still achieved several victories, including the capture of Karshi and an advance on Bukhara. These defeats greatly alarmed the Bolsheviks, who spent massive resources on a counteroffensive. By May 1922, the Red Army launched a major counteroffensive, recapturing Vakjubent, Gijduvan, Kermine, Baysun, Baljuvon, Korfuk, and on June 14, 1922, the Basmachi suffered arguably their biggest loss with the fall of Dushanbe. Around this time, a civil conflict finally broke out between Ibrahim and Enver, leading to significant losses for Enver. By July, he attempted to retreat to Afghanistan, but he was caught in an ambush near Dushanbe in Baljuvan and died in combat against the Armenian Bolshevik commander, Yakov Melkumov, ending his revolt.

== Aftermath ==
The Basmachi movement reached its peak under Enver Pasha and never quite returned to the same strength afterward. The Bolsheviks resumed their conflict with Ibrahim Bek, and at this point, the main strategy of the Basmachi involved cross-border operations along the Afghan-Soviet border. These operations ultimately culminated in direct Soviet interventions into Afghanistan, such as in 1929 when the Soviets attempted to prevent the Saqqawist takeover. The Basmachi movement truly came to an end by 1938 with the death of Junaid Khan.
