= Battles for Dushanbe (1922) =

Russian Civil War battles in Turkestan

- Part of Enver Pasha's Rebellion
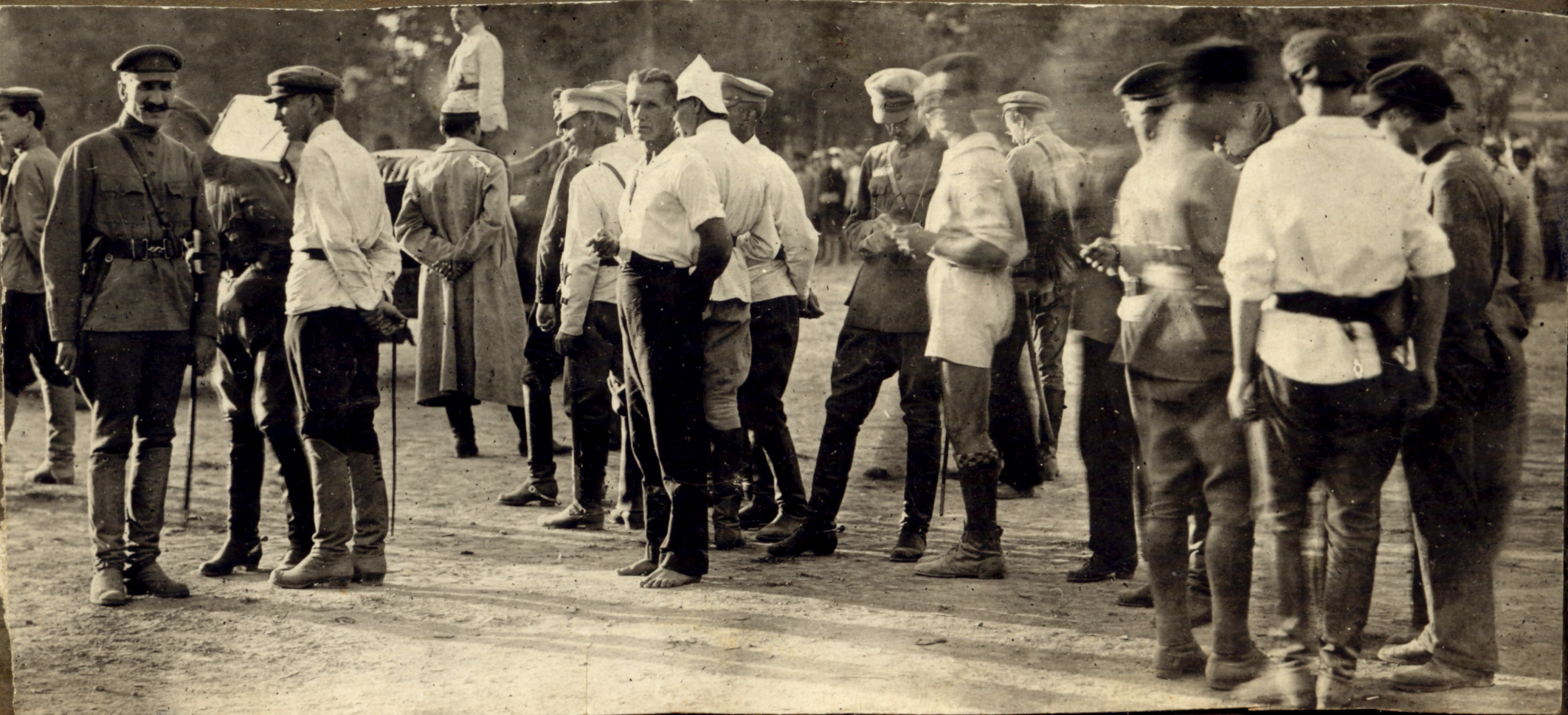
- Picture of Bolshevik officers in Turkestan in 1922
Date	December 1921 – 14 June 1922
Location	Turkestan
Result	Bolshevik victory
Territorial changes	Dushanbe and multiple villages around the city captured by the Red Army

Belligerents
Russian SFSR; Soviet Bukhara	Basmachi Movement

Commanders and leaders
Yakov Melkumov; Nikolai Kakurin	Enver Pasha; Osman Hoca; Ali Rıza; Daniyar Bek

The Battles for Dushanbe (1921–1922) were a series of battles around the Capital city of Tajikistan from late 1921 (when it was besieged by Enver Pasha) on 14 June 1922 Dushanbe was recaptured by Soviet forces.

== Capture by Basmachi bandits ==
Former Ottoman General Enver Pasha had fled to Moscow in August 1920, where he offered his services to the Bolsheviks. In November 1921, he was sent to Central Asia to help suppress the Basmachi Revolt, but after his arrival, he defected to the Basmachi side.

His aim was to unite the various Basmachi groups and create a great Pan-Turkic Empire at the expense of the Bolsheviks. After a number of successful military operations he managed to establish himself as the rebels' supreme commander, and turned their disorganized forces into a small but well-drilled army.

One of his first and biggest actions was besieging Dushanbe. After 3 months, it resulted in a Basmachi victory despite heavy casualties on both sides.

Detailed military reports from the period indicate that by 10 December 1921 the commander of the Soviet 3rd Brigade informed the Turkestan Front Command that they could only hold out for two more days. Consequently, on 11 December, the 7th Regiment in Baysun was ordered to move toward Dushanbe. Despite these maneuvers starting on 13 December, the Basmachi forces were defeated, leading to the retreat of Osman (Kocaoğlu) Hoca and Ali Rıza to Afghanistan.

== Recapture by Bolshevik troops ==
The Soviets were shocked by the capture of Dushanbe. Due to this, the Bolshevik leadership decided to allocate over 1.5 million rubles for the transportation of thousands of Soviet soldiers to Bukhara. The resistance movement was already widespread in Turkestan, posing a real threat to Soviet power, which had initially been maintained through severe repressive measures. This was when the Soviets ended the repression of Islam.

General Nikolai Kakurin was appointed as commander to recapture Dushanbe. Enver's militia was outnumbered and faced a well-equipped army. His attempts to centralize the guerillas to a functioning army angred some other functions, particularly Ibrahim Bek, who was an unreliable ally and did not want to obey him which soon would cause a split between Basmachi Movement.
