= Red Army intervention in Afghanistan (1929) =

Soviet military action

- Part of Afghan Civil War (1928–1929)
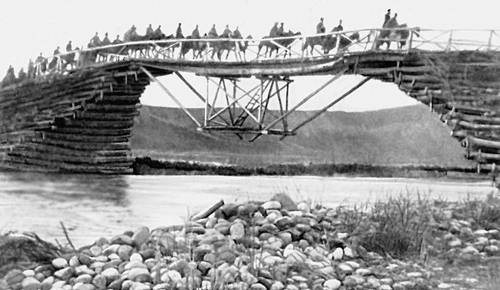
- The Red Army crossing the river Dushanbinka
Date	15 April – 28 May 1929
Location	Kingdom of Afghanistan
Result	Inconclusive; Strategic Soviet failure; The Red Army established control over Balkh Province, but withdrew to the USSR after the flight of King Amanullah Khan abroad.

Belligerents
Soviet Union; Kingdom of Afghanistan	Emirate of Afghanistan; Basmachi

Commanders and leaders
Vitaly Primakov; Aleksandr Cherepanov; Ghulam Nabi Khan	Sayyid Husayn; Ibrahim Bek

Units involved
Soviet Union: Red Army; (Soviet Union) Soviet Air Forces; Kingdom of Afghanistan; Afghan Army; Pashtun tribesmen	Emirate of Afghanistan; Saqqawists

The Red Army intervention in Afghanistan in 1929 also known as the First Soviet Intervention in Afghanistan of 1929 was a special operation aimed at supporting the ousted king of Afghanistan, Amanullah Khan, against the Saqqawists and Basmachi.

== The situation in Afghanistan ==
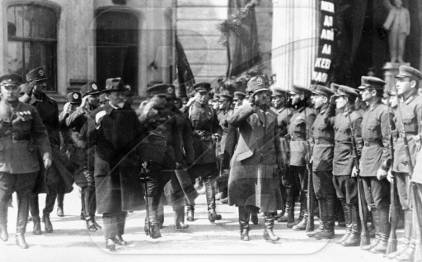
Amanullah Khan on a visit to Moscow.

In 1919, diplomatic ties were established between the Soviet regime and the Emirate of Afghanistan – a development that was perceived by the British Foreign Service as contrary to UK interests. In April 1923, Amanullah Khan promulgated a new constitution in Afghanistan, heralding a program of secularisation that included prohibition of both polygamy and the marriage of minors, and lifting a legal requirement for women to cover their faces in public. These changes led to the creation of a powerful opposition, centred on Islamic leaders.

In March 1924, a major anti-government uprising broke out in Hazarajat. Meanwhile, Amanullah Khan had founded the Afghan Air Force, which was augmented with state-of-the-art De Havilland DH.9A light bombers gifted by the UK. In September 1924, following an invitation of Amanullah Khan, a group of 11 Soviet flight instructors arrived in Kabul, ostensibly to train Afghans in the use of a Soviet-built variant of the DH.9A, the Polikarpov R-1. Protests from the UK were ignored. On 6 October, Soviet crews flew combat sorties in Afghan aircraft, against a rebel-held area in Khost; on October 14, they bombed rebel bases in the Khost and Nadral regions.

On 15 September 1927, the Soviet Politburo decided to transfer to Afghanistan 12 Polikarpov R-1 light bombers, two anti-aircraft batteries (comprising eight guns), and funding for a dedicated flight school.

At the same time, a wave of religiously conservative immigrants who had fled Central Asia as it came under Soviet control, were becoming influential in northern Afghanistan. These included the Basmachi movement, whose members called themselves Mujahideen, and whose most influential leader was Ibrahim Bek. The Soviet government began to pressure the Afghan government to repress the Basmachi.

In November 1928, a new uprising broke out in eastern Afghanistan, led by the Habibullāh Kalakāni (Bacha-ye Saqao). There is controversy regarding the role of British intelligence services in this development; some researchers believe that Habibullah was under the sway of a key advisor, T. E. Lawrence (Lawrence of Arabia). However, Tajik historian Kamoludin Abdullaev does not support this interpretation.

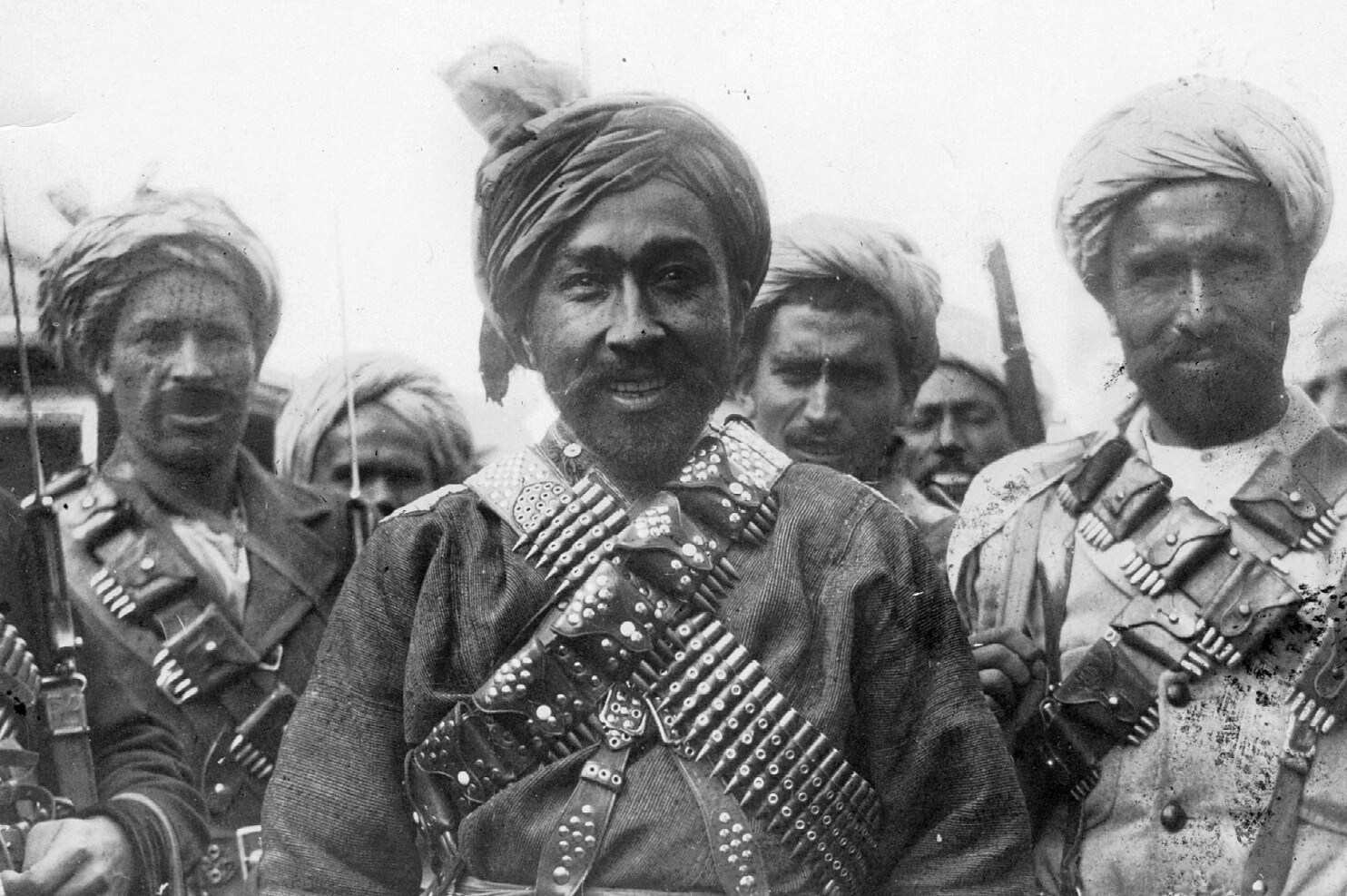
Habibullah Kalakani.

Habibullah was supported by religious leaders. He accused Amanullah Khan of violating sharia, and in the areas that he controlled, reversed secularisation, abolished conscription and land taxes, and cancelled debts; these policies attracted significant support. Justice administration was transferred to Sharia courts, education was transferred to the control of mullahs and some schools were closed. In addition, Habibullah established close contacts with Ibrahim Bek, as leader of the Basmachi, and Mohammed Alim Khan, the former Emir of Bukhara.

Support for Amanullah Khan collapsed; on 11 December 1928, Habibullah was proclaimed Padishah of Afghanistan, and on January 13 he was declared Emir, as Habibullah II. On 14 January 1929, Amanullah Khan formally abdicated and fled to Kandahar. On 17 January, Habibullah occupied Kabul. Ethnic and religious slaughter began in the city. Sunni Pashtuns allegedly massacred Shia adherents, many of them Hazaras. The violence affected, or forced the closure of, schools, factories and radio stations.

State control over other provinces of Afghanistan was lost. Chaos reigned in the country. Ibrahim Bek recalled that riots had begun, one village went to another, settling old accounts. Afghan historian Mir Gulam Muhammad Gubar, a contemporary of those events, wrote that the reign of Habibullah was a tragedy for the country.

== Squad formation ==
Selection in the detachment was conducted by the deputy commander Germanovich. The Afghan detachment was replenished by the Red Army from the 81st cavalry and 1st mountain rifle regiments, as well as the 7th cavalry artillery division of the Red Army with 4 mountain guns, 12 easel and 12 light machine guns. The detachment had a powerful mobile radio station, was perfectly armed, equipped and had a sufficient supply of provisions.

All the Red Army men were dressed in Afghan uniforms. The commanders received Asian names, which were to be called in the presence of the Afghans. The command of the detachment was entrusted to V. M. Primakov (under the pseudonym of the Turkish officer Ragib Bey, the call sign was “Vitmar”). The chief of staff was appointed personnel officer Afghan Hai Dar. Formally, the detachment was subordinate to the Afghan General G. Nabi Khan. On 10 April, a detachment of about 2,000 soldiers was already ready for action.

== Invasion of Afghanistan ==
=== Attack on Patta Gissar ===
In the early morning of 15 April 1929, six aircraft equipped with machine guns crossed the Soviet-Afghan border in the Uzbek city of Termez and appeared over the Afghan border post of Patta Gissar. The garrison employees, not taking proper precautions, went out to look at the aircraft. Airplanes, having made two rounds of the deployed front, sank and fired machine guns at the Afghan border guards. Several bombs were dropped that destroyed the barracks. Of the 50 Afghans who made up the garrison, only two survived. The entire operation lasted 10 minutes. Meanwhile, a detachment led by Vitaly Primakov, crossed the Amu Darya and landed on the Afghan coast via motor boats, cabins and barges.

Two surviving Afghan border guards made their way to the neighboring Siya-Gert border post, 20 miles (32 km) away, and reported what had happened. A garrison of 100 sabers immediately went to Patta Gissar, but after five miles of the road collided with the enemy and was destroyed by machine gun fire. At the same time, Amanullah Khan with 14,000 Hazaras advanced from Kandahar to Kabul.

=== Capture of Kelif, Khanabad and Mazar-i-Sharif ===
On 16 April, Primakov’s detachment approached the city of Kelif. The garrison was given an ultimatum with a proposal to lay down their arms and go home. The Afghans rejected the demands of the Soviet side, but, after several exchanges of gunfire and machine-gun fire, they fled. On 17 April, the city of Khanabad was taken, the defenders of which took refuge in the city of Mazar-i-Sharif. On the night of 18 April, the governor of Mazar-i-Sharif, Mirza Kasym, summoned the Soviet Consul General, with whom he had friendly relations, and demanded clarification on what was happening. The consul was put in a difficult position, since he himself was not informed about this operation of the Red Army on Afghan territory.

On the morning of 22 April, Primakov’s detachment began shelling Mazar-i-Sharif. Machine guns hit the defenders on the walls. Two hours after the start of the battle, the gunners brought the guns to the entrance to the citadel and, having launched a volley, broke the gate. The detachment burst into the city. Part of the remaining garrison fled to Tashkurgan, while others took refuge in the nearby fortress of Dehdadi. A huge number of corpses mutilated by artillery fire lay at the gate. On the same day. a telegram was sent to Tashkent, and from there a dispatch was sent to Moscow: “Mazar is busy with Wittmar’s detachment”.

According to the then Soviet Consul General in Mazar-i-Sharif:

The infantry, rushing into the city, forgot that it had to play the role of the Afghans and went on the attack with the traditional Russian “Hurray”.

— Agabekov, G.S. Cheka, Chapter XXV, "Stalin's adventure of war." (1931)

According to another eyewitness, the illegal representative of the intelligence agency in Mazar-i-Sharif, Matveev:

The operation was carried out extremely crudely. Despite the fact that the detachment was ordered not to speak Russian, after the Mazar-i-Sharif was captured, Russian cursing could be heard all over the place. Our airplanes, which didn't even have stars on the wings painted over, flew daily over the enemy area and dropped bombs in the most unceremonious way. It is possible that some of the foreigners managed to photograph these scenes and then it will be difficult for us to deny it.

During the week of the campaign, 500 Hazaras joined the detachment, of which they formed a separate battalion.

=== The hold of Mazar-i-Sharif ===
At the council of heads of administrations, military leaders and Islamic scholars, it was decided to declare a jihad against the invasion of the "infidels" on their land, to gather a militia to meet the enemy. On 24 April, the garrison of the Dehdadi fortress and tribal militias tried to drive Primakov’s detachment from Mazar-i-Sharif. The fight lasted all day. Numerous, but poorly armed Afghans, with prayers and religious chants, went on the attack in a thick formation in an open area under gun and machine-gun fire. Despite the enormous losses, one wave of attackers was replaced by another. By the end of the day, the attacks stopped, but the position of the besieged was critical. The city was surrounded by a dense ring. A radio transmission was sent to Tashkent asking for help.

On 25 April, a machine-gun squadron was urgently deployed through Amu Darya to Afghanistan, but on the way to Mazar-i-Sharif it was met by superior forces of Afghan militias and was forced to return. On 26 April, 10 machine guns and 200 artillery shells were delivered to Mazar-i-Sharif by airplanes.

Unable to take the city by force, the Afghans, in order to force Primakov’s detachment to surrender, blocked all the irrigation ditches leading to the city at night and set about sieging. The situation in the city was getting worse. A less disciplined Afghan battalion began to murmur. Primakov delivered a report to Tashkent:

The final solution to the problem lies in the mastery of Dehdadi and Balkh. There is no manpower for this. It needs a technique. The issue would be resolved if I received 200 gas grenades (mustard gas, 200 chlorine grenades a little) to the guns. In addition, it is necessary to make the detachment more maneuverable, to give me a squadron of thugs... I have been denied a squadron, aviation, gas grenades. Failure violates the basic condition: take Mazar, then legally help. If you can expect that the situation will change and we will get help, I will defend the city. If help cannot be counted on, then I will play all-in and go to take Dehdadi. If I take it, then we are masters of the situation, if not, we’ll turn to a gang and look for ways to go home.

== Second Unit Invasion ==
On 5 May 1929, to help Primakov’s detachment, a second Red Army detachment of 400 men was sent with 6 guns and 8 machine guns, under the command of a certain Zelim Khan (there is no direct documentary evidence of this, but many facts indicate that it was the commander of the 8th cavalry brigade of the Central Asian Military District, Ivan Yefimovich Petrov). The detachment was also dressed in Afghan uniform. On the way, he was confronted by a border outpost, which "in a matter of minutes was swept away" by the machine gun fire of the Red Army.

=== Capture of Dehdahi, Balkh and Tashkurgan ===
On 6 May, on the positions of the Afghans, near Mazar-i-Sharif, the Central Asian Military District aviation launched bombing and assault strikes. Within a two-day period, the Zelim Khan squadron, after a quick throw, went to Mazar-i-Sharif on 7 May and, together with the Primakov’s detachment, attacked the Afghans who had retreated to Dehdadi. On 8 May, after airstrikes and shelling, the garrison left the fortress, leaving it with 50 guns, 20 machine guns, a large number of small arms and ammunition. After a two-day rest, on 10 May, Primakov’s combined detachment moved in several columns further south, towards Balkh and Tashkurgan. On 12 May, Primakov’s detachment occupied Balkh, and the next day, not meeting any resistance, entered the city of Tashkurgan.

=== Battle with the troops of Ibrahim Bek and Seyid Hussein ===
From the east, against the Primakov detachment, Ibrahim Bek advanced with 3,000 soldiers. Habibullah’s National Guard emerged from Kabul with 1,500 soldiers, under the command of Minister of War, Seyid Hussein. On 11 May, one of the columns of 350 people discovered a detachment of Ibrahim Bek. Immediately on the main line were eight guns. On the flanks, 200 metres (660 ft) from the road, two machine guns were installed. Sights were taken in advance. When approaching the Ibrahim Bek column at 500 metres (1,600 ft), artillery opened fire. Three guns hit the columns in the head, three in the tail, and two in the center. Hidden machine guns were launched from the flanks. Ibrahim's soldiers rushed in different directions. Many of them were killed by the Red Army during the chase. Half an hour after the start of the battle, a detachment of Seyid Hussein discovered the patrol westward. A participant in those events, platoon commander, A. Valishev, left a detailed description of the battle picture:

Two terrible battles lasted ... Basmachi fiercely resisted. The military ingenuity of Ivan Petrov helped to win the battle ( I.E. Petrov -?). By his order, three prisoners captured from the bek were sent to the enemy to inform the leader of the second gang about the results of the previous battle - 2500 were killed, 176 were captured and only three hundred fighters managed to escape. The warning worked: the Basmachi laid down their arms. Of course, if both detachments appeared simultaneously from opposite sides, then, having 10-12-fold superiority in manpower, they could crush the detachment.

Seyid Hussein, leaving his units, fled. According to the representative of the reconnaissance unit in Mazar-e-Sharif Matveev, when the detachment returned on the same road, the decomposed corpses still lay uncleaned.

== Squad return ==
The flight from Afghanistan of Amanullah Khan put Cherepanov’s detachment in a difficult position. In the absence of any legal basis to be inside the country, the stay of the aircraft on its territory was regarded as aggression by the USSR. In addition, in European countries, as well as in Turkey and Iran, it became known about the invasion of the Red Army in Afghanistan. On 28 May, Cherepanov received a radiogram from the Central Asian Military District headquarters on his return to his homeland. G. Nabi Khan moved to Termez, Uzbek SSR.

== Consequences ==
The operation of the Red Army in Afghanistan did not change the situation in the country. More than 300 participants in the campaign were awarded the Order of the Red Banner, and the rest with valuable gifts. In the documents of military units, this operation is listed as The Elimination of Banditry in South Turkestan, and its description in historical works was prohibited.

== See also ==
- Afghan Civil War (1928-1929)
- Afghan campaign of the Red Army (1930)
