= Siege of Dushanbe =

1922 siege of Bukharan capital by Enver Pasha

Siege of Dushanbe (1922)
- Part of Russian Civil War, Enver Pasha's Rebellion, the Basmachi movement, Enver Pasha's campaign in Bukhara, and the Battles for Dushanbe (1922)
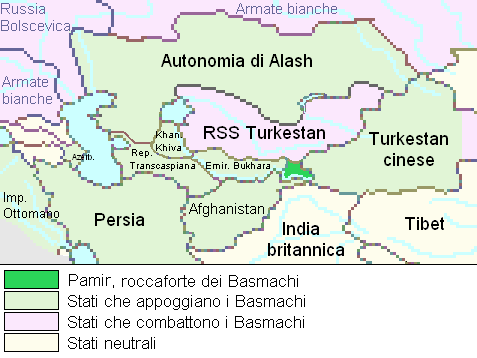
- Areas effected by the Basmachi rebellion in green
Date	28 January or 8 February–14 February 1922
Location	Dushanbe, Soviet Union (now Tajikistan)
Result	Dima\Batu/Haidi victory
Territorial changes	Dushanbe captured by Basmachi forces

Belligerents
Basmachi Movement	Russian SFSR; Soviet Bukhara

Commanders and leaders
Enver Pasha	Unknown Soviet commander †; Mazarof

Strength
~1,500 Basmachi rebels	600

Casualties and losses
Light	Heavy

The siege of Dushanbe took place in February 1922 during the Basmachi rebellion, an anti-Soviet uprising in Central Asia. The town of Dushanbe was captured by Basmachi forces under the command of Enver Pasha, a former Ottoman military leader who had aligned himself with the Basmachi rebels. The Soviet garrison was overwhelmed after a brief siege, and the Basmachi forces gained control of the town, marking a significant moment in the rebellion.

== Background ==
The siege of Dushanbe occurred during the Basmachi rebellion, a widespread anti-Soviet insurgency in Central Asia that lasted from 1916 to 1934. The rebellion was driven by a combination of factors, including resistance to Soviet rule, nationalistic aspirations and local grievances against Bolshevik policies.

Dushanbe, then a small town in the Soviet Central Asian region, was of strategic importance due to its location in the region of Tajikistan. Control of Dushanbe was crucial for both the Basmachi rebels and the Soviet authorities, as it provided a critical base for operations and influence over the surrounding area.

Enver Pasha, a former Ottoman military leader who had fled to Central Asia after World War I, emerged as a prominent leader among the Basmachi forces. His involvement was driven by both personal ambition and the broader goal of resisting Soviet control in the region. Enver Pasha's strategic leadership played a pivotal role in the Basmachi offensive against Soviet positions.

In early 1922, Enver Pasha's Basmachi forces, estimated at 1,500 strong, launched a well-coordinated siege on Dushanbe. The Soviet garrison, although committed to defending the town, faced challenges due to the lack of reinforcements and resources. The siege was characterized by intense combat, with Pasha's forces employing a combination of direct assaults and psychological warfare to pressure the Soviet defenders.

== Encirclement of Dushanbe by the Basmachi forces ==
The town was besieged on 28 January or 8 February. The Russians sent wireless messages requesting reinforcements from the garrisons in Tashkent, Bukhara, and Samarkand. Meanwhile, a Russian cavalry detachment dispatched from Denov to relieve the Bolsheviks trapped in Dushanbe was ambushed; its soldiers were neutralized, and machine guns, rifles, and ammunition were captured.

On 31 January, Soviet troops attempted to raid the village of Kampçı but ultimately failed. The Basmachis captured one horse, inflicted heavy losses on the Russians, and pursued them all the way to Dushanbe.

The Soviet garrison, although determined, struggled to withstand the sustained siege due to limited reinforcements and supplies. The Basmachi rebels were able to cut off supply lines and effectively isolate the town. Intense fighting and the rebels' strategic positioning gradually eroded the Soviet defenses. On 7 February, the Soviets suffered over 100 casualties. The Basmachis captured a machine gun, along with numerous rifles and ammunition. Seventy-two Russian troops defected and joined the Basmachis.

According to Cemal Kutay, the Russian commander in Dushanbe, Mazarof, reported that Enver Pasha had organized a strong resistance movement with growing local support, inflicting heavy losses on Russian forces and compelling them to contemplate abandoning the city.

By 14 February, during a smoky and snowy noon, the town was completely captured, and Enver pursued the retreating Russian forces toward Mirtyube. His troops seized 120 rifles and two machine guns, inflicting around 100 casualties on the Russian garrison, while 88 soldiers defected to his side. At Mirtyube, Enver's forces clashed with the Bolsheviks once again, resulting in a decisive victory for Enver's troops. The remaining elements of the 7th Soviet Regiment retreated to Boysun.

== Aftermath ==
This victory was significant as it demonstrated the effectiveness of Pasha's leadership and the rebels' ability to challenge Soviet control in the region.

The capture of Dushanbe was a temporary success for the Basmachi rebels. The Soviet Union responded with increased military efforts to regain control over the region. Between 28 January and 22 February, Enver Pasha's forces, numbering around 1,500 men, captured Sariosiyo, Qubodiyon, Yurchi, and Denov against a Soviet force estimated at 7,000–8,000 troops. During these engagements, the Russians suffered around seventy deaths, abandoning their supplies, ammunition, five machine guns, two cannons, and hundreds of rifles. Enver was wounded during the operations, and several Russian soldiers defected to join the Basmachi forces. In February, Enver was warned of an impending Russian counterattack and withdrew to Kofarnihon.

== See also ==
- Red army intervention in Afghanistan
- Enver Pasha's Rebellion
- Bukharan Revolution
- Khivan Revolution
