= Aleksandr Cherepanov =

Soviet general (1895–1984)

Aleksandr Ivanovich Cherepanov
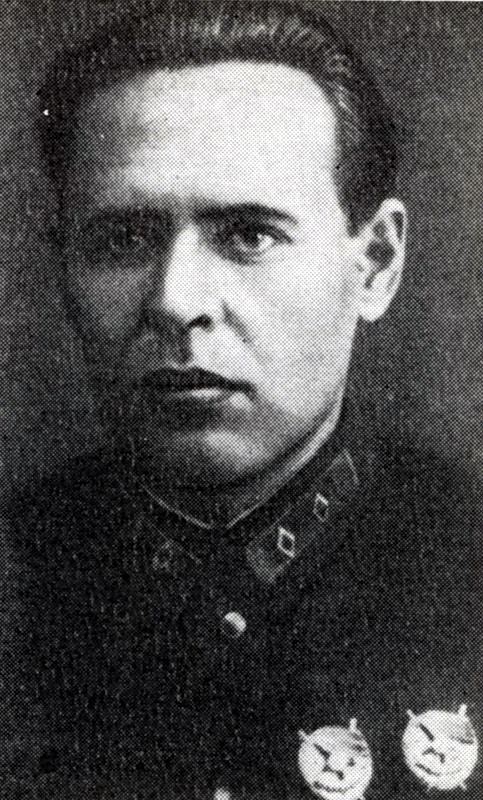
- Born: 21 November 1895; Kislyanskoye, Russian Empire
- Died: 6 July 1984 (aged 88); Moscow, Russian SFSR, Soviet Union
- Military career
- Allegiance: Russian Empire (1915–1917); Soviet Russia (1918–1922); Soviet Union (1922–1955)
- Branch: (Russian Empire) Imperial Russian Army; Red Army / Soviet Army
- Service years: 1915–1917; 1918–1955
- Rank: Lieutenant-general
- Commands: 39th Rifle Division (1929–1930); 23rd Army (1941–1944)
- Conflicts: World War I; Russian Civil War; Polish-Soviet War; Afghan Civil War (1928–1929); Second Sino-Japanese War (as Soviet adviser, 1938–1939); World War II
- Awards: Order of Lenin; Order of the Red Banner (5x); Order of Kutuzov, 2nd class Other decorations

Aleksandr Ivanovich Cherepanov (Russian: Александр Иванович Черепанов; 21 November 1895 [O.S. 9 November] – 6 July 1984) was a Soviet military leader and lieutenant general of the Red Army.

A peasant's son, Cherepanov served as a junior officer in the Russian Army in World War I and took part in the Russian Civil War and Polish-Soviet War with the Red Army.

A 1923 graduate of the Red Army Military Academy, Cherepanov first came to China as a military adviser to Sun Yat-sen's National Revolutionary Army in 1923–1927. He returned as chief military adviser to Chiang Kai-shek's Kuomintang China during the Second Sino-Japanese War in 1938–1939.

Appointed a senior instructor at the General Staff Academy after returning from China, he was named commander of the 23rd Army in 1941 and promoted to lieutenant-general in 1943. A member of the Allied Control Commission in Bulgaria in 1944–1947 and the commission's chairman in 1947, he returned to the Soviet Union to become deputy chief in the Department of Military Colleges of the USSR Ministry of Defense in 1948–1955.

== Biography ==
Born on 21 November 1895 [O.S. 9 November] to a peasant family in the village of Kislyanskoye (now in the Kurgan Oblast of the Russian Federation), Cherepanov received a basic education in the town of Kurgan and was a factory worker and vocational school student in Yekaterinburg and Omsk before being drafted into the Imperial Russian Army in Omsk in 1915. He graduated from a junior officers' school in Irkutsk and fought in World War I as a platoon commander in the 8th Company of the 56th Infantry Regiment of the Russian Army's Northern Front in 1916–1917.

Cherepanov joined the Red Guards soon after the October Revolution of 1917. He entered the newly formed Red Army of Soviet Russia in 1918, in which he served as regimental commander, a regimental chief of staff, and a brigade commander during the Russian Civil War and concurrent Polish-Soviet War.

Selected to attend the Red Army Military Academy at the concluding phase of the Civil War, Cherepanov was one of five volunteers selected from the cadets of the 1923 graduating class to serve as military advisers in China following Foreign Affairs Commissar Joffe's signing of a friendly treaty with China's Kuomintang leader Sun Yat-sen in January 1923, and arrived in Peking on 21 June.

A personal acquaintance of Sun Yat-sen between February 1924 and Sun's death in March 1925, Cherepanov taught at the Whampoa Military Academy alongside Vasily Blyukher, and took part in the campaigns against the regional warlords, joining China's famed Northern Expedition as a senior Soviet adviser. He joined the Soviet Union's Communist Party in 1926.

Cherepanov returned to the Soviet Union in 1927, following Sun's death in 1925 and subsequent breakdown in Sino-Soviet relations with the Kuomintang's new leader, Chiang Kai-shek. (In spite of the ongoing Soviet assistance to the Kuomintang, the anti-communist Chiang had arranged a massacre of communists in Shanghai and expelled his Soviet advisers.) Cherepanov took part in the 1929 Soviet intervention in Manchuria as commander of the Red Army's 39th Rifle Division in the Soviet Far East.

With relations between Chiang and the Soviet Union dramatically improved due to the attack on China by Japanese forces in the Second Sino-Japanese War, Cherepanov returned to China as chief military adviser to Chiang's government in Nanking from August 1938 to September 1939 and helped organize the 1938 defense of Wuhan – although the city fell to the combined might of the Japanese troops, planes, and ships.

Assigned to the Red Army's General Staff Academy as a senior instructor after returning from China, Cherepanov was next named Chief Inspector for the Northwestern Direction following the June 1941 German invasion of the Soviet Union in July 1941. He subsequently led the 23rd Army from September 1941 until July 1944, and was promoted in rank to lieutenant-general on 1 September 1943. His troops took part in the defense of Leningrad and joined in the summer 1944 breaking of the siege and forcing of Nazi Germany's co-belligerent partner Finland to relinquish its positions Karelian Isthmus near Leningrad. The combined Soviet gains compelled Finland to negotiate the Moscow Armistice in 1944.

Recalled from command of the 23rd Army with the turning of the tides of war across the Eastern Front, Cherepanov was sent as a member of the Allied Control Commission in Bulgaria in 1944 and became the commission's chairman in 1947. He was named deputy chief in the Department of Military Colleges of the USSR Ministry of Defense upon returning to Moscow in 1948.

Cherepanov retired from active duty in the armed forces after forty years in the military in 1955. He died in Moscow on 8 July 1984, aged eighty-eight.

A prolific memoirist in the 1960s–1980s, he authored a number of memoirs about his military career, including As Military Adviser in China (Moscow: Progress Publishers), a 1982 English-language translation (ISBN 978-0-8285-2290-8).

== Works ==
- «Боевое крещение». М., 1960;
- «Первые бои Красной Армии». М., 1961;
- «Под Псковом и Нарвой. Февр. 1918 г». М., 1963;
- «Северный поход Национально-революционной армии Китая. (Записки воен. советника)». М., 1968;
- «В боях рожденная». Изд. 3-е. М., 1976;
- «Записки военного советника в Китае». Изд. 2-е. М., 1976;
- «Поле ратное мое». М., 1984.

=== In English translation ===
- Cherepanov, A. I. (1982). As Military Adviser in China. Moscow: Progress Publishers. ISBN 978-0-8285-2290-8.
