= Dehdadi =

Dihdadi
- Location in Afghanistan
- Coordinates: 36°39′44″N 66°59′43″E
- Country: Afghanistan
- Province: Balkh Province
- District: Dihdadi District
- Time zone: + 4.30

Dehdadi or Dihdadi is a town and seat of Dihdadi District in Balkh Province in northern Afghanistan.

== See also ==
- Balkh Province
