= Dihdadi District =

Dihdadi دهدادی
- District
- Location within Afghanistan
- Coordinates: 36°38′24″N 67°00′36″E
- Country: Afghanistan
- Province: Balkh Province
- Elevation: 350 m (1,150 ft)

Population (2012)
  - Total: 65,600

Dihdadi District (Dari: دهدادی) (Pop: 65,600) is situated in the central part of Balkh province, Afghanistan. It is not far from the capital of the province Mazari Sharif - about 15 km in eastern direction from the district capital Dihdadi (also Dehdadi).
