= Nikolai Kakurin =

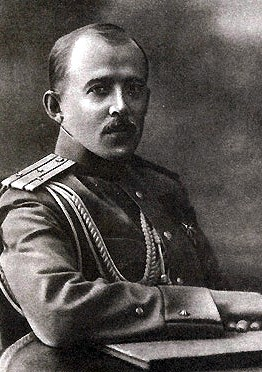
- Nikolai Kakurin in 1916
- Born: Nikolai Yevgenyevich Kakurin; 4 September 1883; Oryol, Russian Empire
- Died: 29 July 1936 (aged 52); Yaroslavl, Soviet Union
- Military career
- Allegiance: Russian Empire (1904–17); Ukrainian Republic (1917-20); Soviet Russia (1920–1922); Soviet Union (1920–30)
- Branch: Imperial Russian Army; Ukrainian People's Army; Ukrainian Galician Army; Red Army
- Service years: 1904–1930
- Rank: Colonel
- Commands: 10th Rifle Division; 4th Red Army; 3rd Red Army
- Conflicts: World War I; Russian Civil War; Polish-Soviet War; Basmachi Movement; Enver Pasha's Rebellion

Nikolai Yevgenyevich Kakurin (Russian: Никола́й Евге́ньевич Каку́рин; 4 September 1883 – 29 July 1936) was a Russian and Soviet military commander.

== Biography ==
He was born into a noble family. His father was Infantry General Evgeniy Nikolaevich Kakurin (1846–1909) and his maternal uncles were Andrei Zayonchkovski and Dmitry Putyata. He served in the Imperial Russian army from 1893, graduated from the Mikhailovsk Infantry School in 1904 and served in the 30th Artillery Brigade and the 18th Artillery Brigade. In 1910, he graduated from the Imperial Nicholas Military Academy as first of his class and on 26 November 1912, he became senior adjutant of the staff of the 5th Infantry Division.

He took part in World War I, and in January 1915, he became senior adjutant of the staff of the 10th Army Corps. Until 6 December 1915, he was acting senior adjutant of the Przemyśl fortress, and then became acting Chief of Staff of the 71st Infantry Division. On 10 August 1916 he was appointed acting chief of staff of the 3rd Transbaikal Cossack Brigade and was part of a unit of General Baratov's Corps operating in Persia.

In October 1917, he went from the front to Kiev, where he remained after the city was occupied by the German army on 1 March 1918. On 8 March, he joined the army of the Ukrainian People's Republic and became assistant to the chief of the General Staff of the Ukrainian People's Army. In April 1919 he was a staff officer of the 3rd Corps of the Ukrainian People's Army, from April to July 1919 he was the chief of staff of the 4th Corps of the Ukrainian Galician Army and from autumn 1919 to March 1920 he remained in the reserve.

Then he went to Moscow, where on 7 May 1920, he was arrested by the Bolsheviks for serving in the Ukrainian and Galician armies, but was released in June 1920. After his release, he joined the Red Army, and in July 1920, he became the chief of staff of the 8th Infantry Division and on 1 August 1920 commander of the 10th Infantry Division, with which he took part in the War with Poland, in the Red Army's march on Warsaw and the subsequent battles.

From 17 to 22 October 1920, he was the temporary commander of the 4th Army and from 24 October to 21 December 1920, the commander of the 3rd Army, after which, on 28 December 1920, he became the second assistant to the commander of the Western Front, Mikhail Tukhachevsky. After Tukhachevsky was appointed commander of the Tambov Group of forces, he became the chief of staff of this group of forces and helped to suppress the Tambov Rebellion. In 1921 he commanded the troops of the Vitebsk region, then he took over the chair of tactics at the Military Academy of the Red Army.
Between March and September 1922, he served as commander of Soviet troops in the Central Asian Bukhara-Fergana region. He participated in the liquidation of Basmachi forces while serving under the Turkestan Front led by Kakurin himself and P. Pavlov, which fielded two cavalry brigades, two cavalry squadrons, one rifle division, about 7,500–8,000 men with twenty machine guns. He contracted malaria and returned to Moscow.

After recovering, he was again a lecturer in tactics at the Military Academy of the Red Army. In 1923 he became the head of the Department of the History of the Civil War at the Red Army Headquarters, and in 1925-1930 he worked again at the Military Academy named after Frunze.

On 19 August 1930, he was arrested, and on 19 February 1932, sentenced to 10 years in prison. He died in the Yaroslavl Prison in 1936.

== Scientific works ==
- Strategy of the proletarian state. (Etude). - [b. m.], 1921.
- Russian-Polish campaign 1918–1920. - M., 1922. - 75 p.
- War with the White Poles, 1920 (co-authored with V. A. Melikov). - M.: Voenizdat, 1925.
- The disintegration of the army in 1917. - M.-L.: State Publishing House, 1925.
- Strategic essay of the civil war. - M.-L.: Military Publishing House, 1926.
- Modern tactics. 3rd ed. - M., 1927.
- Meeting engagement. - M., 1927.
- How the revolution fought: in 2 volumes. Ed. 1st - M., 1925–26; ed. 2nd, add. - M.: Politizdat, 1990. - 500 p. — ISBN 5-250-00811-9; 5-250-00812-7; 5-250-00813-5.
- Strategic essay of the civil war. - M.-L.: Military Publishing House, 1926. - 160 p.
- The uprising of the Czechoslovaks and the fight against Kolchak. - M., 1928.
- Tactics of individual detachments in special conditions of the situation - M., 1927
- The struggle for Petrograd in 1919. - M.-L., 1928.
- Kiev operation of the Poles in 1920 (co-authored with K. Behrends) - M.-L., 1928.
- War with the White Poles. - M.-L., 1930.
- Civil War. 1918-1921: in 3 volumes - T. 3 - 1st ed. - M.: Military Bulletin, 1930.
- Civil war. 1918–1921. N.E. Kakurin and Jukums Vācietis. - 2nd ed. - St. Petersburg: Polygon, 2002. - 672 p. - (Great Controversies). — 5100 copies. — ISBN 5-89173-150-9.

== Sources ==
- Grwar.ru (in Russian)
- The Free dictionary, based on The Great Soviet Encyclopedia (1979).
