= Enver Pasha =

Turkish general and politician (1881–1922)

İsmâil Enver Pasha
- Enver Bey in 1911

Minister of War
- In office 3 January 1914 – 13 October 1918
- Prime Minister: Mehmed Talaat Pasha; Said Halim Pasha
- Preceded by: Ahmet Izzet Pasha
- Succeeded by: Ahmet Izzet Pasha

Chief of the General Staff
- In office 8 January 1914 – 13 October 1918
- Preceded by: Mehmed Hâdî Pasha
- Succeeded by: Ahmed Izzet Pasha

Deputy Commander-in-Chief
- In office 8 January 1914 – 10 August 1918
- Monarchs: Mehmed V Mehmed VI

Chief of Staff of the Commander-in-Chief
- In office 10 August 1918 – 13 October 1918
- Monarch: Mehmed VI

Personal details
- Born: 23 November 1881 Constantinople, Ottoman Empire
- Died: 4 August 1922 (aged 40) Bukharan People's Soviet Republic
- Resting place: Monument of Liberty, Istanbul, Turkey; 41°04′05″N 28°58′55″E
- Party: Union and Progress Party
- Spouse: Emine Naciye Sultan
- Children: Mahpeyker Hanımsultan; Türkan Hanımsultan; Sultanzade Ali Bey
- Education: Army War College (1903)

Military service
- Branch/service: Ottoman Army
- Years of service: 1903–1918
- Rank: Ferik-i evvel
- Commands: Army of Islam; Yildirim Army Group; Third Army
- Battles/wars: See list: Macedonian Struggle; Young Turk Revolution; 31 March Incident; Italo-Turkish War; Battle of Derna; Battle of Tobruk; First Balkan War; Bulgarian front; 1913 Ottoman coup d'état; Second Balkan War; Recapture of Adrianople; World War I; Caucasus campaign; Bergmann Offensive; Battle of Sarikamish; Battle of Goychay; Battle of Baku; Gallipoli campaign; Persian campaign; Basmachi Revolt; Enver Pasha's Rebellion; Siege of Dushanbe (1922); Enver Pasha's campaign in Bukhara (1922); Battle of Yurchi; Battles of Dushanbe †

İsmâil Enver Pasha (Ottoman Turkish: اسماعیل انور پاشا; Turkish: İsmail Enver Paşa; 23 November 1881 – 4 August 1922) was a Turkish military officer, revolutionary, and convicted war criminal who served as the Ottoman Empire's Minister of War from 1914 to 1918. Along with Talaat and Djemal, he was one of the Three Pashas that ruled the Ottoman Empire during World War I and one of the principal perpetrators of the Armenian, Greek, and Assyrian genocides.

While stationed in Ottoman Macedonia, Enver joined the Committee of Union and Progress (CUP), an organization affiliated with the Young Turks movement that was agitating against Sultan Abdul Hamid II's despotic rule. He was a key leader of the 1908 Young Turk Revolution, which reestablished the Constitution and parliamentary democracy in the Ottoman Empire. Along with Ahmed Niyazi, Enver was hailed as "hero of the revolution". However, a series of crises in the empire, including the 31 March Incident, the Balkan Wars, and the power struggle with the Freedom and Accord Party, left Enver and the Unionists disillusioned with liberal Ottomanism. After the 1913 Ottoman coup d'état brought the CUP directly to power, Enver became War Minister, while Talaat assumed control over the civilian government.

As war minister and de facto Commander-in-Chief, Enver was one of the most powerful figures in the Ottoman government. He initiated the formation of an alliance with Germany, and was instrumental in the Ottoman entry into World War I. Enver led a disastrous attack on Russian forces in the Battle of Sarikamish, after which he blamed Armenians for his defeat. Following defeat in World War I, Enver, along with other leading Unionists, escaped the Ottoman Empire. The Ottoman Military Tribunal convicted him and other Unionists and sentenced them to death in absentia for bringing the empire into World War I and organizing massacres against Greeks and Armenians. Enver ended up in Central Asia, where he attempted to realise his pan-Turkic ideals by leading the Basmachi Revolt against the Bolsheviks in Bukhara, where he was killed in 1922. In 1996, his remains were reburied in Turkey. Enver was subsequently rehabilitated by Turkish president Süleyman Demirel, who praised his contributions to Turkish nationalism.

As Enver rose through the ranks of the military, he was known by increasingly esteemed titles, including Enver Efendi (انور افندی), Enver Bey (انور بك), and finally Enver Pasha. "Pasha" was the honorary title granted to Ottoman military officers upon promotion to the rank of Mirliva (major general).

== Early life and career ==
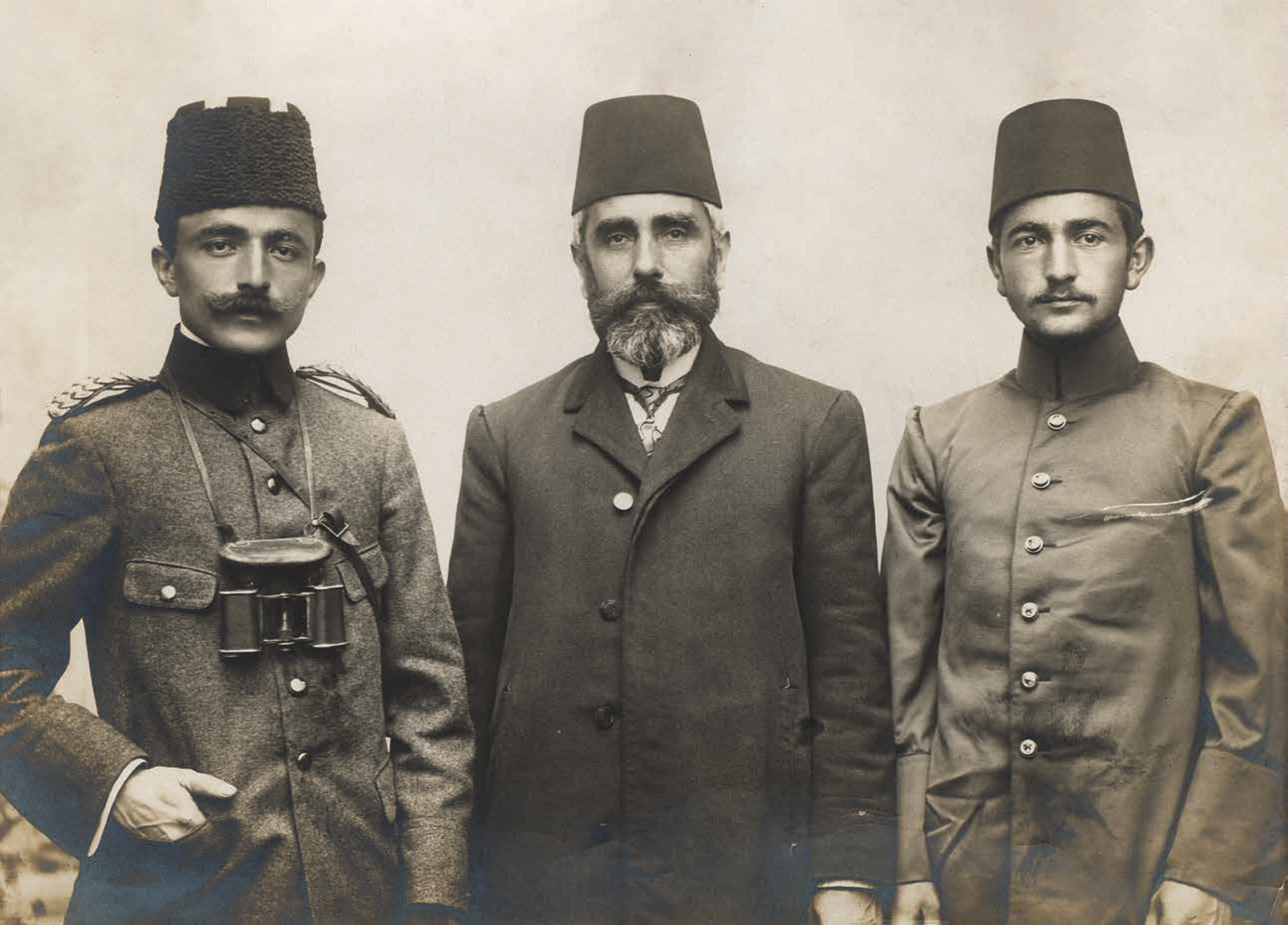
Enver (left) with his father, Ahmed Bey (center), and half-brother Nuri Pasha (later Nuri Killigil; right)

İsmail Enver was born in Constantinople (Istanbul) on 23 November 1881. Enver's father, Ahmed (c. 1860–1947), was either a Gagauz bridge-keeper in Monastir (Bitola), or an Albanian small town public prosecutor in the Balkans. His mother Ayşe Dilara was a Tatar. According to Şuhnaz Yilmaz, he was of Gagauz descent. His uncle was Halil Pasha (later Kut). Enver had two younger brothers, Nuri and Mehmed Kâmil, and two younger sisters, Hasene and Mediha. He was the brother-in-law of Lieutenant Colonel Ömer Nâzım.

At age six, Enver moved with his father to Monastir, where he attended primary school. He studied at several military institutions. In 1902, he graduated from the Ottoman Military Academy making him a mektebli. In the context of the late Hamidian era mekteblis were educated officers hailing from the new military colleges, as opposed to the older alaylı officers which did not receive formal educations, resulting in some in the latter group being illiterate. His classmate in the military academy was the first president of the Turkish Republic Mustafa Kemal (Atatürk), and the two quickly developed a rivalry with one another.

Between 1903 and 1908, Enver was stationed in various locations in Ottoman Macedonia, where he was involved in counter-insurgency operations during the Macedonian Struggle. He fought no less than 54 engagements, mostly against Bulgarian bands, developing a reputation as an expert counter-insurgent. During his service, he became convinced of the need for reforms in the Ottoman military.

By 1905 Enver was recognized for his service with distinction. He became a lieutenant colonel was awarded the fourth and third class Mecidiye medals, fourth class Osmaniye medal, and a gold medal of merit for his outstanding achievements in military operations against Bulgarian, Greek and Albanian insurgents. This did not mean he was immune from the suspicions of Yıldız Palace. He was interrogated by the secret police for alleged seditious activity against the government, but he was not convicted. These events radicalized Enver's perceptions of nationalism, and a sympathy for the Young Turks as he became skeptical of the Hamidian regime.

== Joining the CUP ==
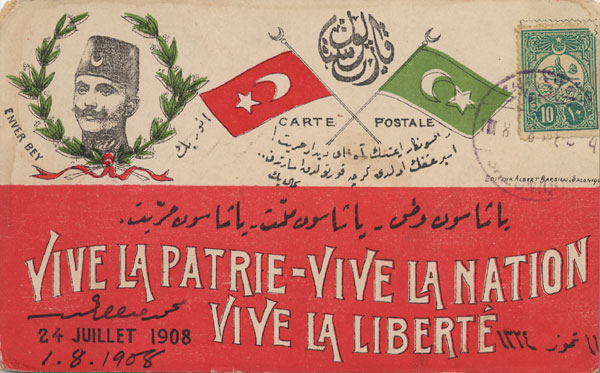
Enver Pasha (then Enver Bey) depicted on a Young Turks flyer with the slogan Long live the fatherland, long live the nation, long live liberty written in Ottoman Turkish and French

Enver, through the assistance of his uncle, Halil Kut, became the twelfth member of the nascent Ottoman Freedom Society (OFS). The OFS later merged with the Paris-based Committee of Union and Progress (CUP) led by Ahmed Rıza. The CUP gained access to the Third Army through Enver. Upon his return to Monastir in 1906, Enver formed a CUP cell within the town and worked closely with Ottoman officer Kâzım Karabekir. Enver became the main figure in the CUP Monastir branch, and he initiated Ottoman officers like Ahmet Niyazi bey and Eyüp Sabri into the CUP organisation.

In the early twentieth century some prominent Young Turk members such as Enver developed a strong interest in the ideas of Gustave Le Bon. For example, Enver saw deputies as mediocre and in reference to Le Bon he thought that as a collective mind they had the potential to become dangerous and be the same as a despotic leader. As the CUP shifted away from the ideas of members who belonged to the old core of the organisation to those of the newer membership, this change assisted individuals like Enver in gaining a larger profile in the Young Turk movement.

In Ohri (modern Ohrid) an armed band (çete) called the Special Muslim Organisation (SMO) composed mostly of notables was created in 1907 to protect local Muslims and fight Internal Macedonian Revolutionary Organization (IMRO) bands. Enver along with Sabri recruited the SMO and turned it into the Ohri branch of the CUP with its band becoming the local CUP band. CUP Internal headquarters proposed that Enver go form a CUP band in the countryside. Approving the decision by the committee to assassinate his brother-in-law Lieutenant Colonel Ömer Nâzım, Enver under instructions from CUP headquarters traveled from Selanik (Thessaloniki) to Tikveş on 26 June 1908 to establish a band. CUP headquarters conferred upon Enver the title of "CUP Inspector General of Internal Organisation and Executive Forces".

== Young Turk Revolution ==
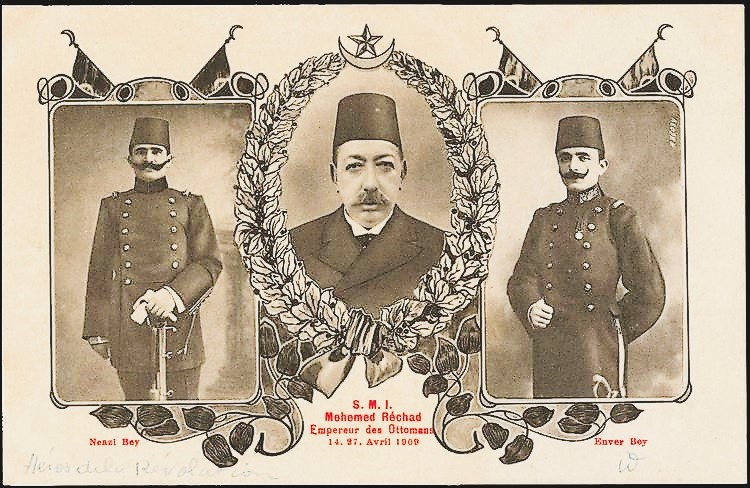
Postcard of Mehmed V flanked by Niyazi Bey (left) and Enver Bey (right)

On 3 July 1908, Niyazi, protesting the rule of Abdul Hamid II, fled with his band from Resne (modern Resen) into the mountains where he initiated the Young Turk Revolution and issued a proclamation that called for the restoration of the constitution of 1876. Following his example, Enver in Tikveş, and other officers such as Sabri in Ohri, also went into the mountains and formed guerilla bands. It is unclear whether the CUP had a fixed date for the revolution; in comments made in an interview following the event Enver stated that they planned for action in August 1908, yet events had forced them to begin the revolution at an earlier time. For the revolt to get local support Enver and Niyazi played on fears of possible foreign intervention. Enver led a band composed of volunteers and deserters. For example, he allowed a deserter who had engaged in brigandage in areas west of the river Vardar to join his band at Tikveș. Throughout the revolution, guerilla bands of both Enver and Niyazi consisted of Muslim (mostly Albanian) paramilitaries.

Enver sent an ultimatum to the Inspector General on 11 July 1908 and demanded that within 48 hours Abdul Hamid II issue a decree for CUP members that had been arrested and sent to Constantinople to be freed. He warned that if the ultimatum was not complied with by the Inspector General, he would refuse to accept any responsibility for future actions. In Tikveș a handwritten appeal was distributed to locals calling for them to either stay neutral or join with him. Enver possessed strong authority among fellow Muslims in the area where he resided and could communicate with them as he spoke both Albanian and Turkish. During the revolution, Enver stayed in the homes of notables, and as a sign of respect they would kiss his hands since he had earlier saved them from an attack by an IMRO band. He stated that the CUP had no support in the countryside apart from a few large landowners with CUP membership that lived in towns, yet they retained influence in their villages and were able to mobilise the population for the cause. Whole settlements were enrolled into the CUP through councils of village elders convened by Enver in Turkish villages of the Tikveş region. As the revolution spread by the third week and more officers deserted the army to join the cause, Enver and Niyazi got like minded officials and civilian notables to send multiple petitions to the Ottoman palace. Enver wrote in his memoirs that while he still was involved in band activity in the days toward the end of the revolution he composed more detailed rules of engagement for use by paramilitary units and bands.

On 23 July he proclaimed an age of liberty in front of the government mansion of Köprülü. In Salonica, he spoke from the balconies of the Grand Hôtel D'Angleterre to a crowd in the city center, where he declared that absolutism was finished, and Ottomanism would prevail. The square would be named Eleftherias Square, or the Square of Liberty thereafter. Facing a deteriorating situation in the Balkans, on 24 July Sultan Abdul Hamid II restored the constitution of 1876.

== Aftermath ==
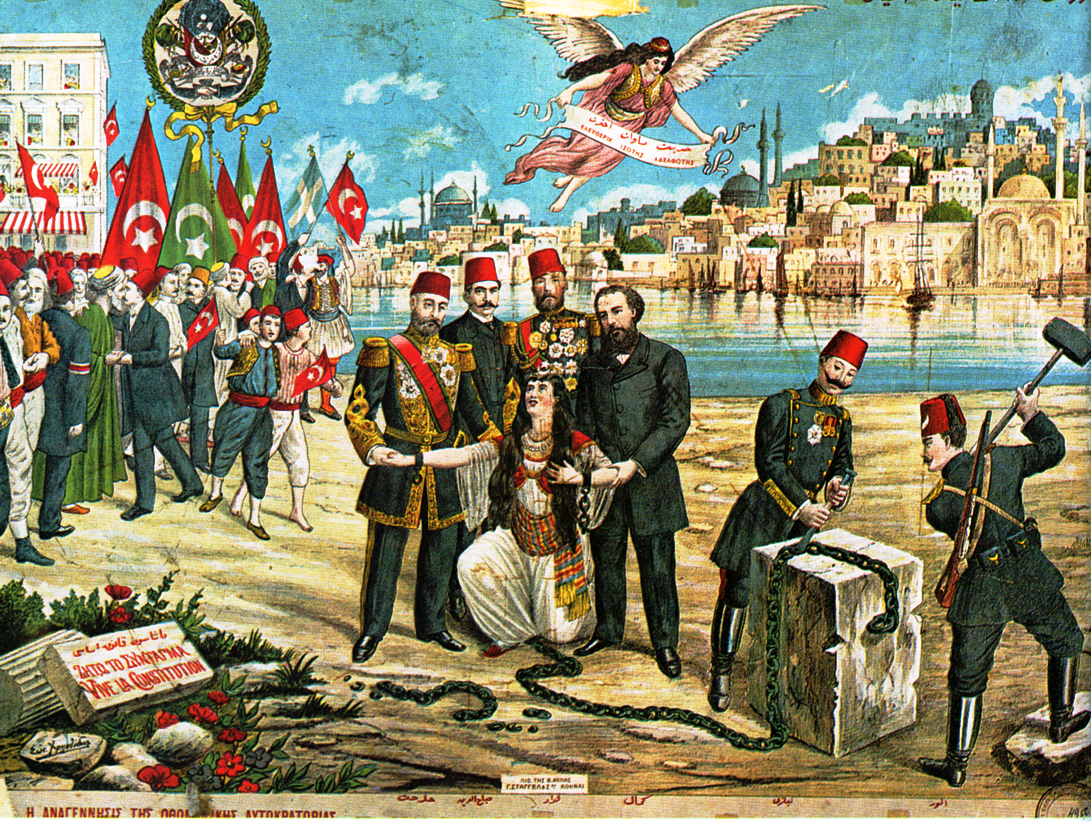
Greek lithograph celebrating the 1908 revolution. Enver is depicted in the lower right hand corner with a large hammer freeing Lady Liberty from her chains.

In the aftermath of the revolution, Niyazi and Enver remained in the political background due to their youth and junior military ranks with both agreeing that photographs of them would not be distributed to the general public; however, this decision was rarely honoured. Instead, Niyazi and Enver as leaders of the revolution elevated their positions to near legendary status, with their images placed on postcards and distributed throughout the Ottoman state. Toward the latter part of 1908, photographs of Niyazi and Enver had reached Constantinople and school children of the time played with masks on their faces that depicted the revolutionaries. In other images produced at the same time, the sultan is presented in the centre, flanked by Niyazi and Enver to either side. As the actions of both men carried the appearance of initiating the revolution, Niyazi, an Albanian, and Enver, a Turk, later received popular acclaim as "heroes of freedom" (hürriyet kahramanları) and symbolised Albanian-Turkish cooperation.

As a tribute to his role in the Young Turk Revolution that began the Second Constitutional Era of the Ottoman Empire, Niyazi is mentioned along with Enver in the March of the Deputies (Turkish: Mebusan Marşı or Meclis-i Mebusan Marşı), the anthem of the Chamber of Deputies, the lower house of the Ottoman parliament. It was performed in 1909 upon the opening of the new parliament. The fourth line of the anthem reads "Long live Niyazi, long live Enver" (Turkish: "Yaşasın Niyazi, yaşasın Enver"). The Ottoman newspaper Volkan, a strong supporter of the constitution published adulatory pieces about Enver and Niyazi in 1909.

Following the revolution, Enver rose within the ranks of the Ottoman military and had an important role within army–committee relations. Soon after the revolution he was assigned to the Inspectorate of the Rumelian Provinces, but in March 1909 he was the military attaché at Berlin and formed personal ties with high ranking German state officials and the Kaiser. It was during this time that Enver came to admire the culture of Germany and power of the German military. He invited German officers to reform the Ottoman Army. In 1909 a reactionary conspiracy to organise a countercoup culminated in the 31 March Incident; the countercoup was put down. Enver for a short time in April 1909 returned to Constantinople to join the Action Army. As such he took an active role in the suppression of the countercoup, which resulted in the overthrow of Abdul Hamid II, who was replaced by his brother Mehmed V, while the power of the CUP was consolidated. Throughout the Young Turk era, Enver was a member of the CUP central committee from 1908 to 1918.

In March 1911, he was recalled from Berlin and once again sent to Macedonia by War Minister Mahmud Şevket Pasha, whom he first met on 19 March 1911, to inspect the measures taken against insurgents in Macedonia. Making the rounds in Salonica, Üsküp, Monastir, Köprülü and Tikveş, he also met with the leading figures of the CUP. He returned to Istanbul on 11 May 1911. On 27 July he left the capital to suppress the Malissori rebellion as the chief of staff of the Second Corps, traveling to Shkodër via Trieste, again spending time to resolve disputes between the Unionists and Albanian nationalists. Later, he went to Berlin, but returned home when the Italians attacked Tripoli.

== Italo-Turkish War ==
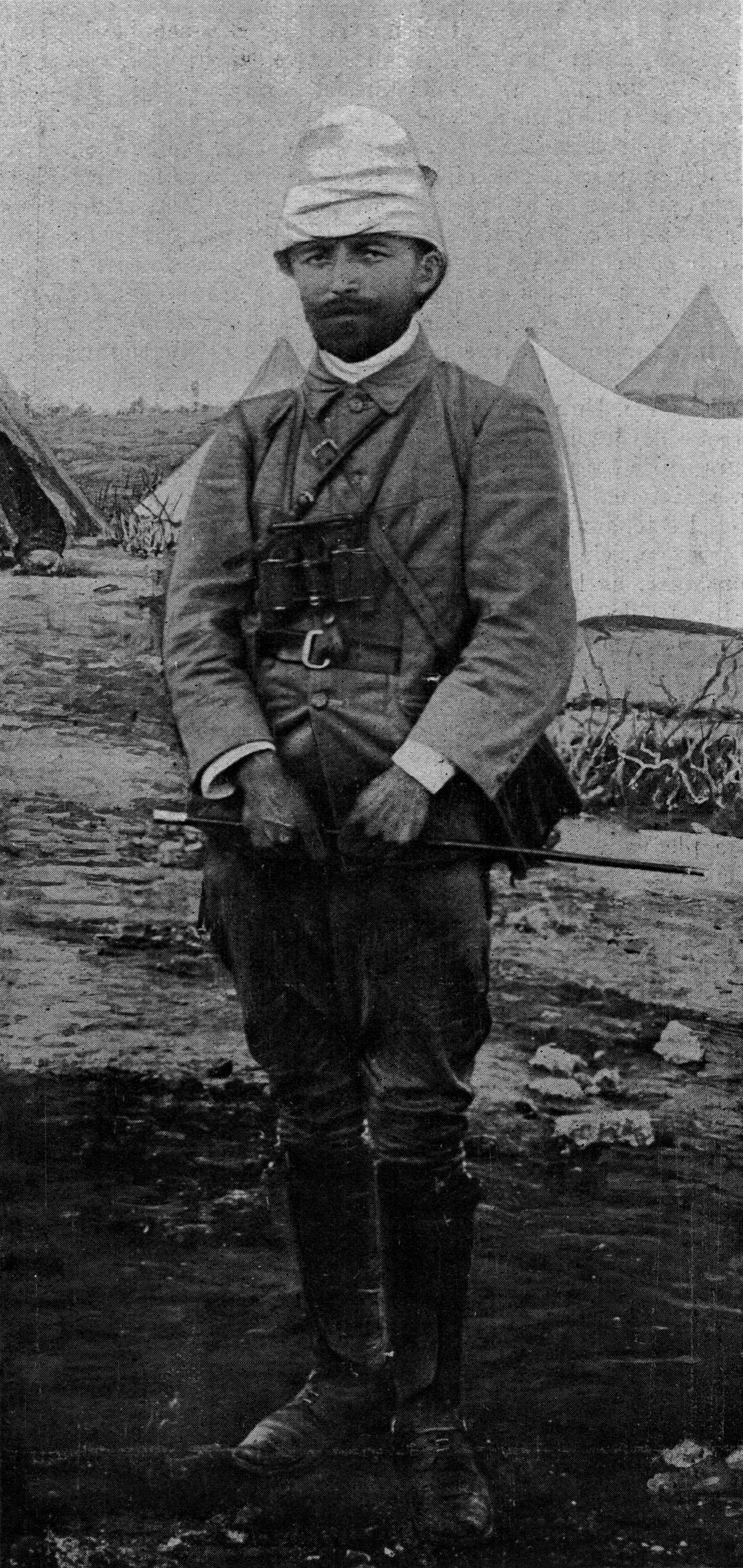
Enver Bey in Libya during the Italo-Turkish War, 1911–12, wearing the style of hat named "Enveriye" after him

On 29 September 1911, Italy launched an invasion of the Ottoman vilayet of Tripolitania (Trablus-i Garb, modern Libya), starting the Italo-Turkish War. Enver advocated for a guerilla war against the Italians in a CUP congress and went off to Libya with several other Unionist military officers, which formed the nucleus of the Special Organization. After meeting with the sultan and government officials he left Istanbul for Alexandria on 10 October. He established various contacts with prominent Arab leaders in Egypt and set off for Benghazi on October 22. He established his military headquarters in Ayn al-Mansur on 1 December 1911. There, he assumed the overall command after successfully mobilizing 20,000 troops. He achieved great success in the war and guerrilla operations against the Italians. On 24 January 1912, he was officially appointed commander of the General Benghazi Zone [Umum Bingazi Mıntıkası kumandanlığı]. On 17 March 1912, he was additionally appointed as the mutasarrif of Benghazi, and then Kaymakam. Because of the outbreak of the Balkan Wars, however, Enver and other Ottoman generals in Libya were called back to Istanbul. This allowed Italy to take control of Libya.

== Balkan Wars and 1913 coup ==
In October 1912, the First Balkan War broke out, and the Ottoman armies suffered severe defeats at the hands of the Balkan League. In late November 1912, he found his way back to Istanbul via the route of Alexandria (during which he was disguised), Brindisi (which he travelled to on an Italian ship), and Vienna. Enver was appointed as the Chief of the General Staff of the Tenth Corps on 1 January 1913 to fight on the Bulgarian front.

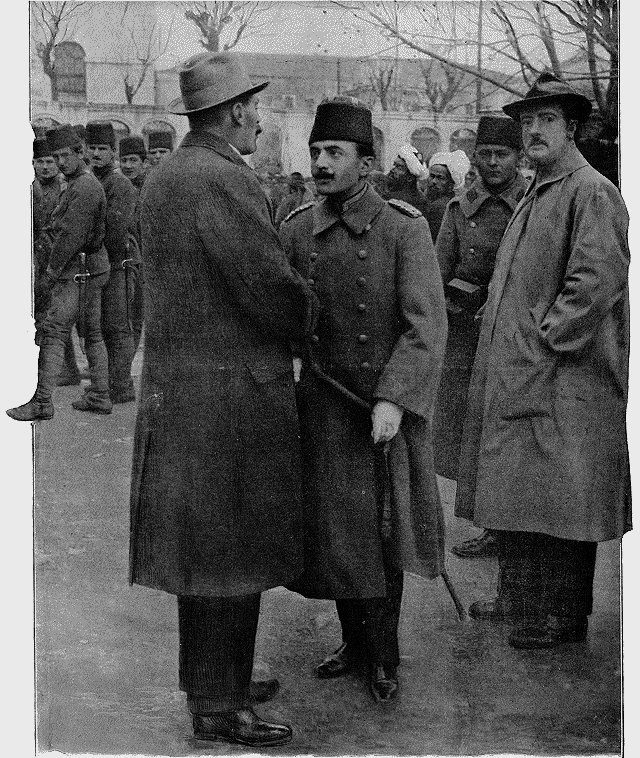
Enver Bey (center) talking to the British attaché and press in Constantinople immediately after seizing power in the 1913 Raid on the Sublime Porte, also known as the 1913 Ottoman coup d'état

.

While he was in Libya, the Ottoman political situation had significantly deteriorated. The loss of Libya cost the CUP in popularity. After rigging the 1912 elections against the Freedom and Accord Party, opposition to the CUP in the military brought down their government in a coup by military memorandum. However military defeat in the First Balkan War weakened anti-Unionist government, and gave the committee the chance to seize power.

On 23 January 1913, Enver and CUP leader Mehmed Talaat with a group of fifty Unionists stormed into the Sublime Porte and overthrew the government. Enver had Kâmil Pasha resign from the Grand Vizierate at gun point. This was done after extensive activity dissuading Kâmil from peace negotiations. Enver earlier reached an agreement with the Minister of War Nâzım Pasha to force Kâmil Pasha to resign and to form a government that would resume war, but he was unsuccessful in convincing the sultan of cashiering his prime minister. Nâzım Pasha ended up getting accidentally cut down during the coup, so the premiership was awarded to Mahmud Shevket Pasha. A radicalized CUP in power now suppressed the opposition. Turkey then withdrew from the peace negotiations then under way in London and did not sign the Treaty of London (1913), resuming the First Balkan War. A complicated plan was envisaged to envelop Bulgarian forces on the Gallipoli peninsula (Battle of Şarköy), which was bungled by due to bad communications between Enver, Ali Fethi (Okyar), and Mustafa Kemal. The change in government did not change the fact that the war was lost, and the Ottoman Empire gave up almost all of its Balkan territory to the Balkan League.

In June 1913, however, the Second Balkan War broke out between the Balkan Allies. Enver Bey took advantage of the situation and led an army into Eastern Thrace, recovering Adrianople (Edirne) from the Bulgarians, who had concentrated their forces against the Serbs and Greeks, with the Treaty of Constantinople (1913). Enver is therefore recognised by some Turks as the "conqueror of Edirne".

When Shevket was assassinated on 11 June 1913, the CUP took full control over the empire. Enver was basically the leader of the military cadre of the CUP and was influential in making vital decisions. His reconquest of Edirne increased his prestige. He became a colonel on 15 December 1913, and then a mirliva (brigadier general) on 3 January 1914. That same date, he replaced Ahmed İzzet Pasha as Minister of War and Hâdî Pasha as Chief of the General Staff (8 January 1914). Despite great criticism, he achieved this position at a very young age and as a result of rapid promotion, thanks to both his high prestige among the public and unparalleled power of the CUP. He also married HIH Princess Emine Naciye Sultan (1898–1957) on 5 March 1914, the daughter of Prince Süleyman, thus entering the royal family as a damat ("bridegroom" to the ruling House of Osman). They were previously engaged on 15 May 1911.

Enver worked with great effort in his new position to reorganize the Ottoman army, which had been defeated in the First Balkan War. Almost all of the old alaylı officers of the Hamidian era were purged, and young officers were appointed to important positions in the army. Officers such as Mustafa İsmet (İnönü) and Musa Kâzım Karabekir, who were part of this effort, acknowledged that these reforms were successful. This reorganization by Enver Pasha also ensured that the military cadre, which played an important role in the establishment of the Turkish Republic, rose in the Ottoman army.

== World War I ==
Being able to communicate in German, Enver Pasha, along with Talaat and Halil Bey were architects of the Ottoman-German Alliance, and expected a quick victory in the war that would benefit the Ottoman Empire. Without informing the cabinet, he allowed the two German warships SMS Goeben and SMS Breslau, under the command of German admiral Wilhelm Souchon, to enter the Dardanelles to escape British pursuit; the subsequent "donation" of the ships to the neutral Ottomans worked powerfully in Germany's favor, despite French and Russian diplomacy to keep the Ottoman Empire out of the war. Finally on 29 October, the point of no return was reached when Admiral Souchon, now Commander-in-Chief of the Ottoman navy, took Goeben, Breslau, and a squadron of Ottoman warships into the Black Sea and bombed the Russian ports of Odessa, Sevastopol, and Theodosia. Russia declared war on Ottoman Empire on 2 November, and Britain followed suit on 5 November. Most of the Turkish cabinet members and CUP leaders were against such a rushed entry to the war, but Enver Pasha held that it was the right course of action.

As soon as the war started, 31 October 1914, Enver ordered that all men of military age report to army recruiting offices. The offices were unable to handle the vast flood of men, and long delays occurred. This had the effect of ruining the crop harvest for that year.

=== Battle of Sarikamish, 1914 ===
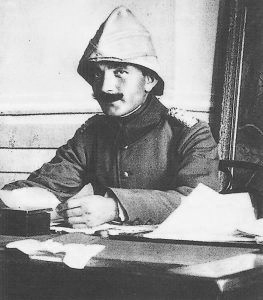
Enver Pasha in 1914

Enver Pasha's only actual command during World War I was on the Caucasus front. Enver Pasha assumed command of the Ottoman forces arrayed against the Russians in the Caucasus theatre after dismissing Hasan Izzet Pasha. He wanted to encircle the Russians, force them out of Ottoman territory, and take back Kars and Batumi, which had been ceded after the Russo-Turkish War of 1877–78. Enver thought of himself as a great military leader, while the German military adviser, Liman von Sanders, thought of him as incompetent. Enver ordered a complex attack on the Russians, but despite the objections of the commanders in his command, Enver Pasha continued the forward operation under harsh winter conditions in the mountains. In what was known as the Battle of Sarikamish a large portion of the 90,000-strong army froze to death in the Allahüekber Mountains or were killed by the Russians, so he left the front on 10 January 1915 and returned to Istanbul. This was the single worst Ottoman defeat of World War I and Enver did not perform any active front-line duty for the rest of the war. On his return to Constantinople, Enver Pasha blamed his failure on his Armenian soldiers, although in January 1915, an Armenian named Hovannes had saved his life during a battle by carrying Enver through battle lines on his back. Nonetheless, Enver Pasha later initiated the deportations and sporadic massacres of Western Armenians, culminating in the Armenian genocide.

=== Commanding the forces of the capital, 1915–1918 ===
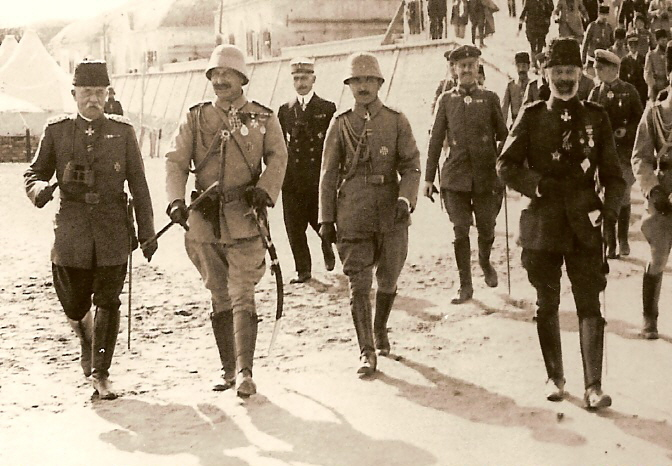
Wilhelm II and Enver Pasha in Gallipoli

After his defeat at Sarıkamış, Enver returned to Istanbul (Constantinople) and took command of the Turkish forces around the capital. He was confident that the capital was safe from any Allied attacks. The British and French were planning on forcing the approaches to Constantinople in the hope of knocking the Ottomans out of the war. A large Allied fleet assembled and staged an attack on the Dardanelles on 18 March 1915. The attack (the forerunner to the failed Gallipoli campaign) was a disaster, resulting in the loss of several ships. As a result, Enver turned over command to Liman von Sanders, who led the successful defence of Gallipoli. Enver then left to attend to pressing concerns on the Caucasus Front. Later, after many towns on the peninsula had been destroyed and women and children killed by the Allied bombardment, Enver proposed setting up a concentration camp for the remaining French and British citizens in the empire. Henry Morgenthau, the American ambassador to the Ottoman Empire, convinced Enver not to go through with this plan.

=== Yildirim ===
Enver's plan for Falkenhayn's Yildirim Army Group was to retake Baghdad, recently taken by Maude. This was nearly impossible for logistical reasons. Turkish troops were deserting freely, and when Enver visited Beirut in June 1917, soldiers were forbidden to be stationed along his route for fear that he would be assassinated. Lack of rolling stock meant that troops were often detrained at Damascus and marched south.

=== Army of Islam ===
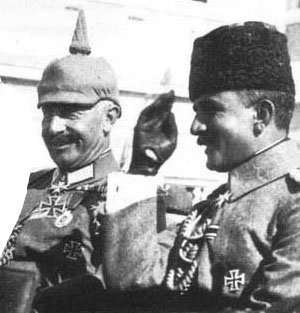
Wilhelm II and Enver Pasha in 1917

During 1917, due to the Russian Revolution and subsequent Civil War, the Russian army in the Caucasus fell apart and dissolved. At the same time, the CUP managed to win the friendship of the Bolsheviks with the signing of the Ottoman-Russian friendship treaty (1 January 1918). Enver looked for victory when Russia withdrew from the Caucasus region. When Enver discussed his plans for taking over southern Russia, he ordered the creation of a new military force called the Army of Islam which would have no German officers. Enver's Army of Islam avoided Georgia and marched through Azerbaijan. The Third Army under Vehib Pasha was also moving forward to pre-war borders and towards the First Republic of Armenia, which formed the frontline in the Caucasus. General Tovmas Nazarbekian was the commander on the Caucasus front, and Andranik Ozanian took the command of Armenia within the Ottoman Empire. The Ottoman advance was halted at the Battle of Sardarabad.

The Army of Islam, under the control of Nuri Pasha, moved forward and attacked Australian, New Zealand, British, and Canadian troops led by General Lionel Charles Dunsterville at Baku. General Dunsterville ordered the evacuation of the city on 14 September, after six weeks of occupation, and withdrew to Iran. As the Army of Islam and their Azerbaijani allies entered the city on September 15 following the Battle of Baku, up to 30,000 Armenian civilians were massacred.

However, after the Armistice of Mudros between Great Britain and the Ottoman Empire on 30 October, Ottoman troops were obliged to withdraw and replaced by the Triple Entente. These conquests in the Caucasus counted for very little in the war as a whole but they did however ensure that Baku remained within the boundaries of Azerbaijan while a part of the Soviet Union and later as an independent nation.

== Armistice and exile ==
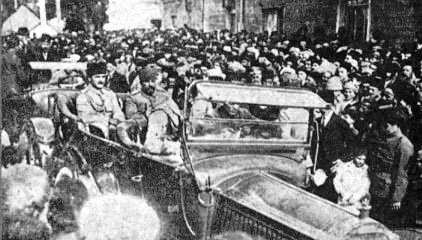
Enver Pasha in Batumi in 1918

Faced with defeat, the Sultan dismissed Enver from his post as War Minister on 4 October 1918, while the rest of Talaat Pasha's government resigned on 14 October 1918. On 30 October 1918, the Ottoman Empire capitulated by signing the Armistice of Mudros. 1–2 November 1918, he escaped to Odessa by boarding a German submarine from Arnavutköy with seven other leaders of the CUP. In exile they hoped to continue agitating against the Allies from abroad in the conflict which came to be known as the Turkish War of Independence.

On 1 January 1919, the new government discharged Enver Pasha from the army. He was tried in absentia in the Turkish Courts-Martial of 1919–20 for crimes of "plunging the country into war without a legitimate reason, forced deportation of Armenians and leaving the country without permission" and condemned to death.

From Crimea Enver first attempted to link up with units under Halil and Nuri to defend against the Allies, but his boat ran aground and hearing the army was demobilizing he gave up and went to Berlin like the other Unionists émigrés did. He settled in the suburb of Babelsberg to maintain an emigre network of exiled CUP members. In April 1919 after meeting with Karl Radek with Talaat, he took on the role of a secret envoy for his friend General Hans von Seeckt who wished for a German-Soviet alliance. In August 1920, Enver sent Seeckt a letter in which he offered on behalf of the Soviet Union the partition of Poland in return for German arms deliveries to Soviet Russia. Besides working for General von Seeckt, Enver envisioned cooperation between the new Soviet Russian government against the British, and went to Moscow.

Accompanying Mehmed Ali Sâmi, Enver's new pseudonym, was his Unionist comrade Bahaeddin Şakir. Sâmi would be a doctor representing the Turkish Red Crescent in Russia. On 10 October 1919, their plane flight took off from the German border and stopped in Königsberg and then Šiauliai but crashed in the outskirts of Kaunas, Lithuania. Stranded in a country teeming with Allied soldiers, they were not recognized by journalists or occupation forces until they were about to escape. They were eventually arrested for two months, but Enver and Şakir managed to escape from the Lithuanian prison back to Berlin. Enver and Şakir tried again to enter Russia by air but their plane broke down and crashed not even beyond the German border. After tending to their wounds in a near by village, they returned to Berlin. Enver's insistence to arrive to Moscow by plane costed them another plane crash in flight trials. Eventually Cemal joined the duo, and using a plane that successfully passed flight tests they set off once again for Moscow. But hearing strange noises from the engine, Enver asked the pilot to turn back. After small repairs to the plane Enver attempted a fifth flight to Moscow, where the plane disintegrated one hour into the flight. While Enver was determined to make a grand entrance from the sky, Şakir and Cemal gave up and instead joined a Russian prisoner of war convoy heading back to their homeland. Enver's new alias was now Herr Altman, "a German Jewish Communist of no importance". In his sixth attempt, a one-seat plane carrying Enver and a pilot malfunctioned in mid-air and landed in British-occupied Danzig. Enver begged the pilot to repair the plane lest he would be captured by the British. Taking off once again, they only made it as far as Königsberg. The plane once again repaired, they made it to Bolshevik occupied Estonia to refill on gas, but the Bolsheviks arrested Enver, mistaking him for a fugitive Baltic German count that fled to Germany, and imprisoned him in the city of Reval. Enver's case for his identity was not helped when an Estonian peasant identified him as the abusive count. Enver took up painting in prison, at one point painting a portrait of the warden and his family. With the Estonian-German peace treaty, Enver was repatriated to Germany as the German count.

Enver finally made it to Moscow in August 1920 (he came by land in the end). There he was well-received staying in the guesthouse in the Sofiskaia Naberezhnaya district, and established contacts with representatives from Central Asia and other exiled CUP members as the director of the Soviet Government's Asiatic Department. He also met with Bolshevik leaders, including Georgy Chicherin, Radek, Grigory Zinoviev and Vladimir Lenin. He tried to support the Turkish national movement and corresponded with Mustafa Kemal, giving him the guarantee that he did not intend to intervene in the movement in Anatolia. According to two letters dated 25 and 26 August to von Seect, he asked for arms support to the Anatolian movement in his meetings with Trotsky and even received a promise.

Between 1 and 8 September 1920, he was in Baku for the Congress of the Peoples of the East, representing Libya, Tunisia, Algeria, and Morocco. His appearance was a personal triumph, but the congress failed in its aim to create a mass pro-Bolshevik movement among Muslims. Victor Serge, a witness, recorded that:

At Baku, Enver Pasha put in a sensational appearance. A whole hall full of Orientals broke into shouts, with scimitars and yataghans brandished aloft: "Death to imperialism" All the same, genuine understanding with the Islamic world ... was still difficult.

He returned to Berlin in early October 1920 and settled in the luxurious Grünewald district. Enver Pasha then went to Switzerland, where he met with Hakkı Pasha and decided to establish a secret organization to send military aid from Russia to Anatolia. The committee included Major Fischer, von Seect's former aide-de-camp, and Captain Kress, who was in charge of military equipment at the German War Ministry. However, the necessary financial aid could not be obtained from Moscow. According to a letter dated November 4, 1920, written by Halil Pasha to Enver Pasha, new demands in this area were also rejected by Karahan. Enver went to Moscow again at the end of February 1921 and held several meetings with Chicherin and Bekir Sami (Kunduh), the representative of the new Ankara government. When the Greeks advanced on Ankara on 30 July, Enver arrived to Batum with other Unionist leaders with the hope to enter Anatolia and usurp the Turkish nationalist movement from Mustafa Kemal. At that time, the Trabzon chapter of the Defence of Rights Committee openly supported him. However this attempt was abortive as Ankara's victory in the Battle of the Sakarya caused Enver Pasha's plans to completely change once again.

== Relations with Mustafa Kemal ==
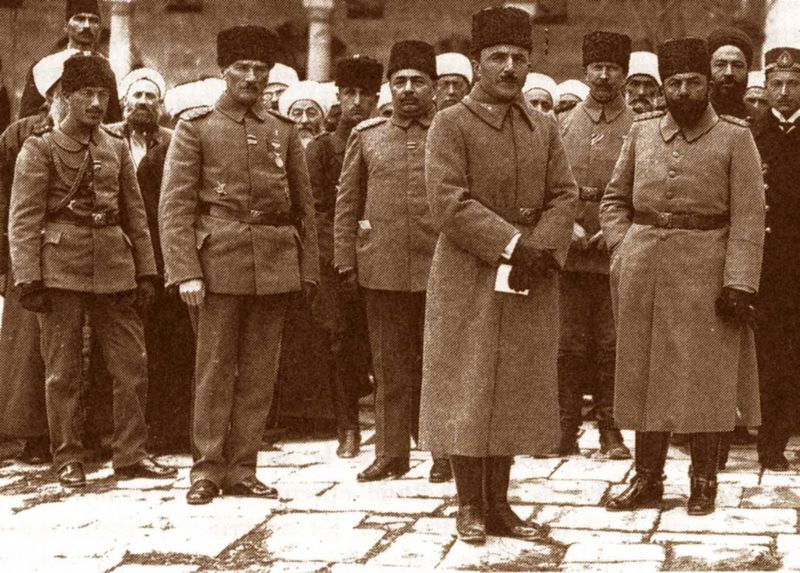
Mustafa Kemal Pasha (second in the back) and Enver Pasha (front) while inspecting the front in Damascus in 1917

The relationship between Enver and Mustafa Kemal was complex and has been subject to considerable historical debate and political manipulation, particularly in Kemalist historiography, which has exaggerated the mens' rivalry and portrayed Kemal as a longstanding opponent of Enver and the Committee of Union and Progress (CUP).

== Last years ==
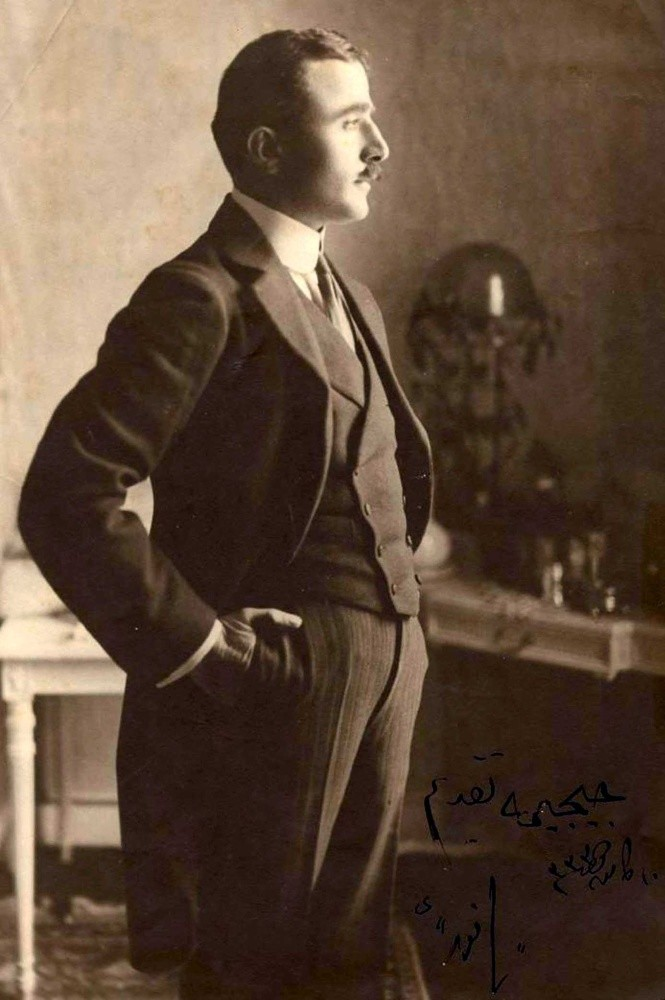
A portrait of Enver Pasha

On 30 July 1921, with the Turkish War of Independence in full swing, Enver decided to return to Anatolia. He went to Batum to be close to the new border. However, Mustafa Kemal did not want him among the Turkish revolutionaries. Mustafa Kemal had stopped all friendly ties with Enver Pasha and the CUP as early as 1912, and he explicitly rejected the pan-Turkic ideas and what Mustafa Kemal perceived as Enver Pasha's utopian goals. Enver Pasha changed his plans and traveled to Moscow where he managed to win the trust of the Soviet authorities. In November 1921 he was sent by Lenin to Bukhara in the Bukharan People's Soviet Republic to help suppress the Basmachi Revolt against the local pro-Moscow Bolshevik regime. Instead, however, he made secret contacts with some of the rebellion's leaders and, along with a small number of followers, defected to the Basmachi side. His aim was to unite the numerous Basmachi groups under his own command and mount a co-ordinated offensive against the Bolsheviks in order to realise his pan-Turkic dreams. After a number of successful military operations he managed to establish himself as the rebels' supreme commander, and turned their disorganized forces into a small but well-drilled army. His command structure was built along German lines and his staff included a number of experienced Turkish officers.

According to David Fromkin:

However Enver's personal weaknesses reasserted themselves. He was a vain, strutting man who loved uniforms, medals and titles. For use in stamping official documents, he ordered a golden seal that described him as 'Commander-in-Chief of all the Armies of Islam, Son-in-Law of the Caliph and Representative of the Prophet.' Soon he was calling himself Emir of Turkestan, a practice not conducive to good relations with the Emir whose cause he served. At some point in the first half of 1922, the Emir of Bukhara broke off relations with him, depriving him of troops and much-needed financial support. The Emir of Afghanistan also failed to march to his aid.

On 4 August 1922, as he allowed his troops to celebrate Eid al-Adha while retaining a guard of 30 men at his headquarters near the village of Ab-i-Derya near Dushanbe, the Red Army Bashkir cavalry brigade under the command of ethnic Armenian Yakov Melkumov (Hakob Melkumian), launched a surprise attack. According to some sources, Enver and some 25 of his men mounted their horses and charged the approaching troops, when Enver was killed by machine-gun fire. In his memoirs, Enver Pasha's aide Yaver Suphi Bey stated that Enver Pasha died of a bullet wound right above his heart during a cavalry charge. Alternatively, according to Melkumov's memoirs, Enver managed to escape on horseback and hid for four days in the village of Chaghan. His hideout was located after a Red Army officer infiltrated the village in disguise. Melkumov's troops ambushed Enver at Chaghan, and in the ensuing combat he was killed by machine gun fire. Some sources write that Melkumov personally killed Enver Pasha with his sabre, although Melkumov does not claim this in his memoirs.

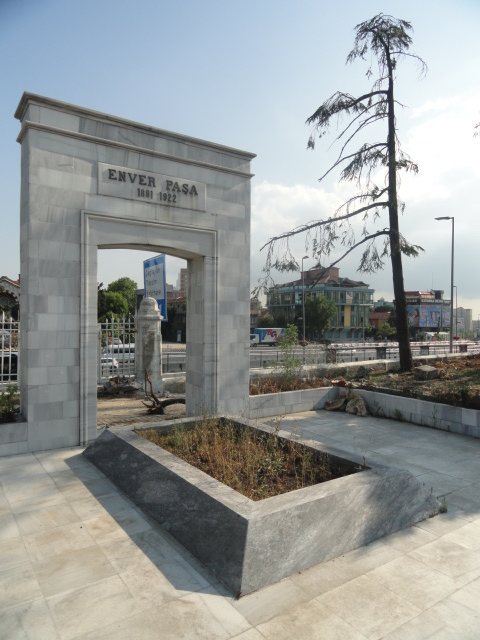
Enver Pasha's grave at the Abide-i Hürriyet (Monument of Liberty) cemetery in Istanbul, where his remains were interred in 1996

Fromkin writes:

There are several accounts of how Enver died. According to the most persuasive of them, when the Russians attacked he gripped his pocket Koran and, as always, charged straight ahead. Later his decapitated body was found on the field of battle. His Koran was taken from his lifeless fingers and was filed in the archives of the Soviet secret police.

Enver's body was buried near Ab-i-Derya in Tajikistan. In 1996, his remains were brought to Turkey and reburied at Abide-i Hürriyet (Monument of Liberty) cemetery in Şişli, Istanbul. He was re-buried on the 4 August, the anniversary of his death in 1922. Enver Pasha's image remains controversial in Turkey, since Enver and Atatürk had a personal rivalry at the end of the Ottoman Empire and his memory was cultivated by the Kemalists. But upon his body's arrival in Turkey, he was rehabilitated by the Turkish President Süleyman Demirel who held a speech acknowledging his contributions to Turkish nationalism. Following renewed hostilities between Armenia and Azerbaijan over the Nagorno Karabakh region in 2020, Enver Pasha's role during World War I was praised by Turkish President Erdoğan during an Azeri victory parade in Baku. In 2023, Azerbaijani officials issued a map of the formerly Armenian Stepanakert, renaming one of the streets after Enver Pasha.

== Family ==
After Enver's death, three of his four siblings, Nuri (1889–1949), Mehmed Kamil (1900–62), and Hasene Hanım, adopted the surname "Killigil" after the 1934 Surname Law required all Turkish citizens to adopt a surname.

Enver's sister Hasene Hanım married Nazım Bey. Nazım Bey, an aid-de-camp of Abdul Hamid II, survived an assassination attempt by Talaat during the 1908 Young Turk Revolution of which his brother-in-law Enver was a leader. With Nazım, Hasene gave birth to Faruk Kenç (1910–2000), who would become a famous Turkish film director and producer.

Enver's other sister, Mediha Hanım (later Mediha Orbay; 1895–1983), married Kâzım Orbay, a prominent Turkish general and politician. On 16 October 1945, their son Haşmet Orbay, Enver's nephew, shot and killed a physician named Neşet Naci Arzan, an event known as the "Ankara murder". At the urging of the Governor of Ankara, Nevzat Tandoğan, Haşmet Orbay's friend Reşit Mercan initially took the blame. After a second trial revealed Haşmet Orbay as the perpetrator, however, he was convicted. The murder became a political scandal in Turkey after the suicide of Tandoğan, the suspicious death of the case's public prosecutor Fahrettin Karaoğlan, and the resignation of Kâzım Orbay from his position as Chief of the General Staff of Turkey after his son's conviction.

Djevdet Bey who was the Vali of Van in 1915, was also a brother-in-law of his.

== Marriage ==
Around 1908, Enver Pasha became the subject of gossip about an alleged romance between him and Princess Iffet of Egypt. When this story reached Istanbul, the grand vizier, Hüseyin Hilmi Pasha decided to exploit Enver's marital eligibility by arranging a rapprochement between the Committee for Union and Progress and the imperial family. After a careful search, the grand vizier chose the twelve-year-old Naciye Sultan, a granddaughter of Sultan Abdulmejid I, as Enver's future bride. Both the grand vizier and Enver's mother then notified him of this decision. Enver had never seen Naciye, and he did not trust his mother's letters, since he suspected her of being enamored with the idea of having a princess as her daughter-in-law.

Therefore, he asked a reliable friend, Ahmed Rıza Bey, who was president of the Ottoman Parliament to investigate. When the latter reported favorably on the prospective bride's education and beauty, as well as on the prospective dowry, Enver took a practical view of this marriage and accepted the arrangement. Naciye had been previously engaged to Şehzade Abdurrahim Hayri. However, Sultan Mehmed V broke off the engagement, and in April 1909, when Naciye was just twelve years old, engaged her to Enver, fifteen years older than her. Following the old Ottoman pattern of life and tradition, the engagement ceremony was celebrated in Enver's absence as he remained in Berlin.

The marriage took place on 15 May 1911 in the Dolmabahçe Palace, and was performed by Şeyhülislam Musa Kazım Efendi. Head clerk of the sultan Halid Ziya Bey served as Naciye's deputy, and her witnesses were director of the imperial kitchen Galib Bey, and the personal physician of the sultan Hacı Ahmed Bey. Minister of War Mahmud Şevket Pasha served as Enver's deputy, and his witnesses were aide-de-camp of the sultan Binbaşı Re'fet Bey and chamberlain of the imperial gates Ahsan Bey. The wedding took place about three years later on 5 March 1914 in the Nişantaşı Palace. The couple were given one of the palaces of Kuruçeşme. The marriage was very happy.

Refik Halid Karay believed Enver went through with the marriage in order to overthrow the Ottoman dynasty in a coup and have the legitimacy to create his own imperial dynasty.

On 17 May 1917, Naciye gave birth to the couple's eldest child, a daughter, Mahpeyker Hanımsultan. She was followed by a second daughter, Türkan Hanımsultan, born on 4 July 1919. Both of them were born in Istanbul. During Enver's stay in Berlin, Naciye and her daughters Mahpeyker and Türkan joined him. When Enver left for Russian SSR his family remained there. His son, Sultanzade Ali Bey was born in Berlin on 29 September 1921, after Enver's departure and he never saw him. Naciye was widowed at Enver's death on 4 August 1922.

After his death, Naciye remarried his brother Mehmed Kamil Killigil (1900–1962) in 1923, and had one other daughter, Rana Hanımsultan.

== Issue ==
By his wife, Enver had two daughters and a son:

- Mahpeyker Hanımsultan (17 May 1917 – 3 April 2000). Married once, had a son.
- Türkan Hanımsultan (4 July 1919 – 25 December 1989). Married once, had a son.
- Sultanzade Ali Bey (29 September 1921 – 2 December 1971). Married twice, had a daughter.

== In arts and culture ==
Enver Pasha plays an important role in The Golden House of Samarkand, a comic book by Hugo Pratt, from the Italian series Corto Maltese.

== Works ==
- Enver authored a book in German, Enver Pascha «um Tripolis», which is his diaries during the war in Libya (1911–12).

== See also ==
- Pursuit of Goeben and Breslau
- Harun el-Raschid Bey, born Wilhelm Hintersatz, Enver's aide-de-camp

== Sources ==
- Fromkin, David (1989), A Peace to End All Peace, Avon Books
- Kansu, Aykut (1997). The Revolution of 1908 in Turkey. Brill. ISBN 9789004107915.
- Moorehead, Alan (1997), Gallipoli, Wordsworth Editions, p. 79, ISBN 1-85326-675-2.
- Woodward, David R (1998), Field Marshal Sir William Robertson, Westport, CT & London: Praeger, ISBN 0-275-95422-6.
