= Ibrahim Bek =

Leader of Islamic resistance to the Soviet Union

- Ibrohimbek Chaqaboev/Иброҳимбек Чакабаев (Uzbek)
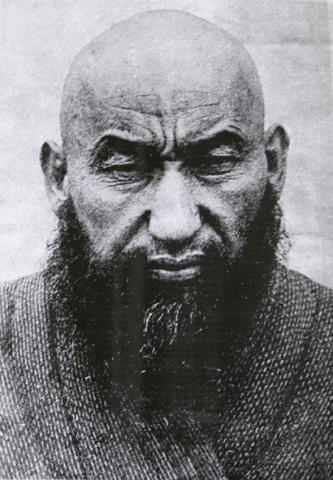
- Islamist Uzbek leader Ibrahimbek Chaqaboev
- Born: Ibrahimbek Chaqaboev; 1889; Emirate of Bukhara
- Died: August 31, 1931 (aged 41–42); Tajik SSR

Ibrahim Bek Lakai (Uzbek: Ibrohimbek Laqay; 1889 – 31 August 1931), also known as Mullah Muhammad Ibrahimbek Chaqabay Toqsaba Oghli (Uzbek: Mulla Muhammad Ibrohimbek Chaqaboy To‘qsabo o‘g‘li) and Ibrahimbek Chaqabayev (Russian: Ибрахимбек Чакабаев) was an Uzbek leader in the Basmachi movement, a liberation movement in Central Asia, which fought against the Red Army. He was a member of the Lakai tribe in Eastern Bukhara and led an organized resistance against the Soviet military in the early 1920s.

== Biography ==
Ibrahim Bek was born around 1889 in the Emirate of Bukhara. He hailed from the Lakai tribe, a group of Uzbeks distinguished by their tribal and regional identity. His tribal background influenced his leadership style and his close association with traditional Islamic values. A conservative Muslim, Ibrahim Bek eventually emerged as a prominent leader in the Basmachi movement, a guerrilla resistance against the Russian conquest of Central Asia after the Russian Revolution. Unlike secular, nationalist, or pan-Turkist factions within the Basmachi movement, Ibrahim Bek presented an Islamic conservative ideology advocating for the restoration of Islamic authority and tribal autonomy under the Emirate of Bukhara. Ibrahim Bek strongly opposed the Pan-Turkism of Enver Pasha, emphasizing the Islamic basis of resistance over secularism, nationalism, and other political ideologies perceived as foreign. Ibrahim Bek eventually expelled the jadids from within the Basmachi ranks and actively fought against Enver Pasha. Despite being a capable guerrilla leader, Ibrahim Bek was essentially a relic of an older time and was to find his increasingly sophisticated military tactics out of step with the political nature of the Russian Civil War.

Ibrahim Bek and his Basmachi were engaged and defeated by Red Army units of the Turkestan Military District under the command of Mikhail Frunze in the spring of 1925. The Soviets asserted that Bek had been provided assistance by British intelligence services.

Ibrahim Bek was eventually forced to flee south into Afghanistan, from where he along with Faizal Maksum led several cross-border raids back into the newly organized Soviet Socialist Republic of Tajikistan. Ibrahim Bek was based in Kunduz and Aliabad. Between 1926 and 1931, Ibrahim Bek led raids into Uzbekistan and Tajikistan. Eventually, Ibrahim Bek was captured by Tajik villagers and turned in to Soviet authorities, where he was executed on August 31, 1931. By mid-1931, the Basmachi had been largely defeated by the Red Army.

== See also ==
- Osman Batur
