= History of rail transport in Russia =

Aspect of Russian history

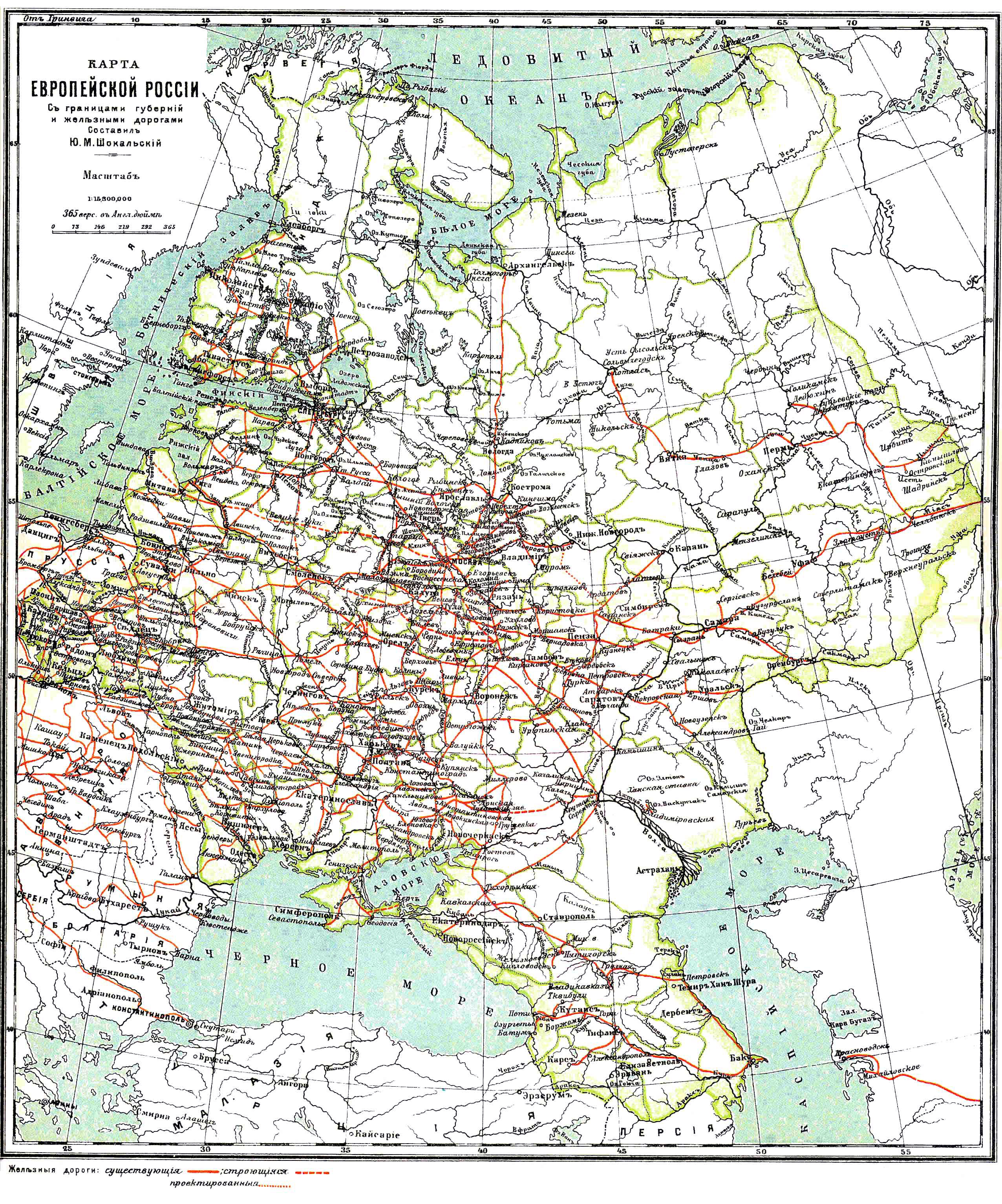
Railways in the Russian Empire around 1900

Russia was and is the largest country in the world. Its geography of north–south rivers and east–west commerce, plus, importantly, the mostly flat terrain, made it very suited to develop railroads as the basic mode of transportation.

Today Russian Railways, a state-owned railway company, is one of the biggest railway companies in the world with 950,000 employees and a monopoly within Russia. The total length of line used by the Russian Railways is, at 85,500 kilometres (53,130 mi), one of the largest in the world, exceeded only by the United States.

== General history ==
=== Russian Empire (1837–1917) ===
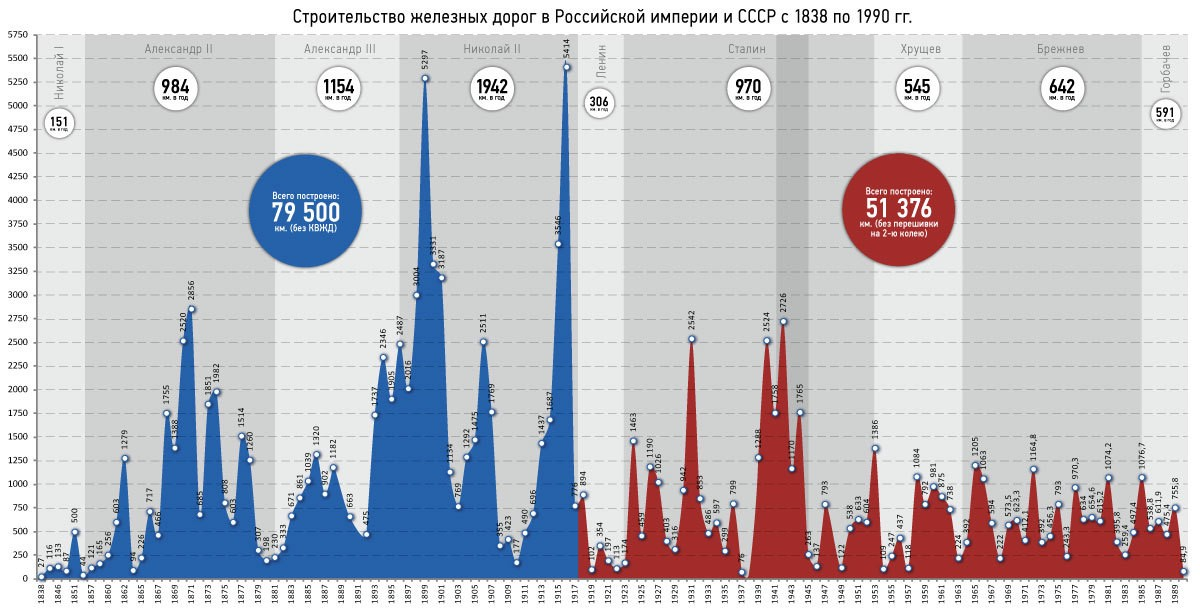
Russian railroads construction by year 1837–1989

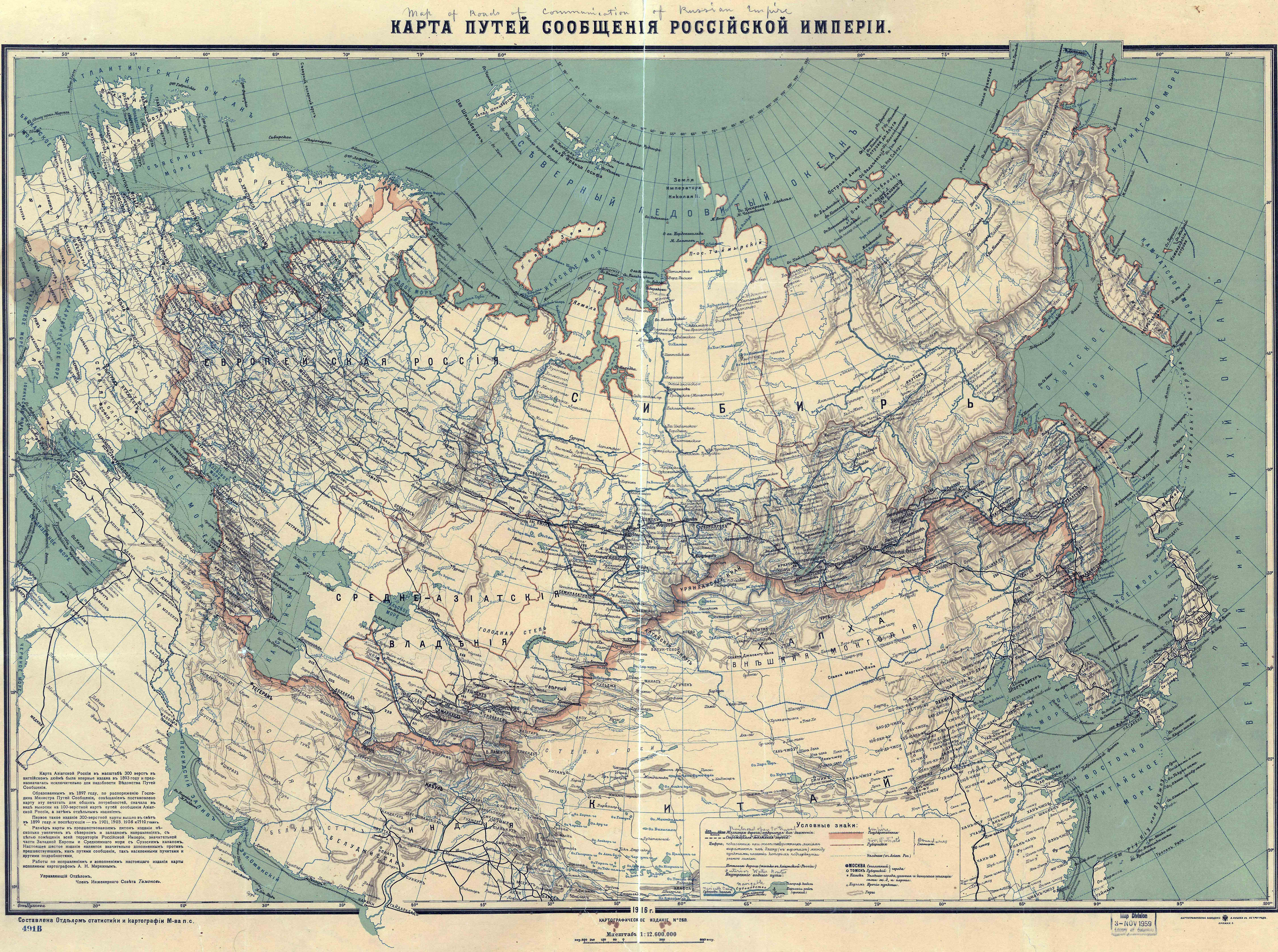
Map of Russian railroads in 1916

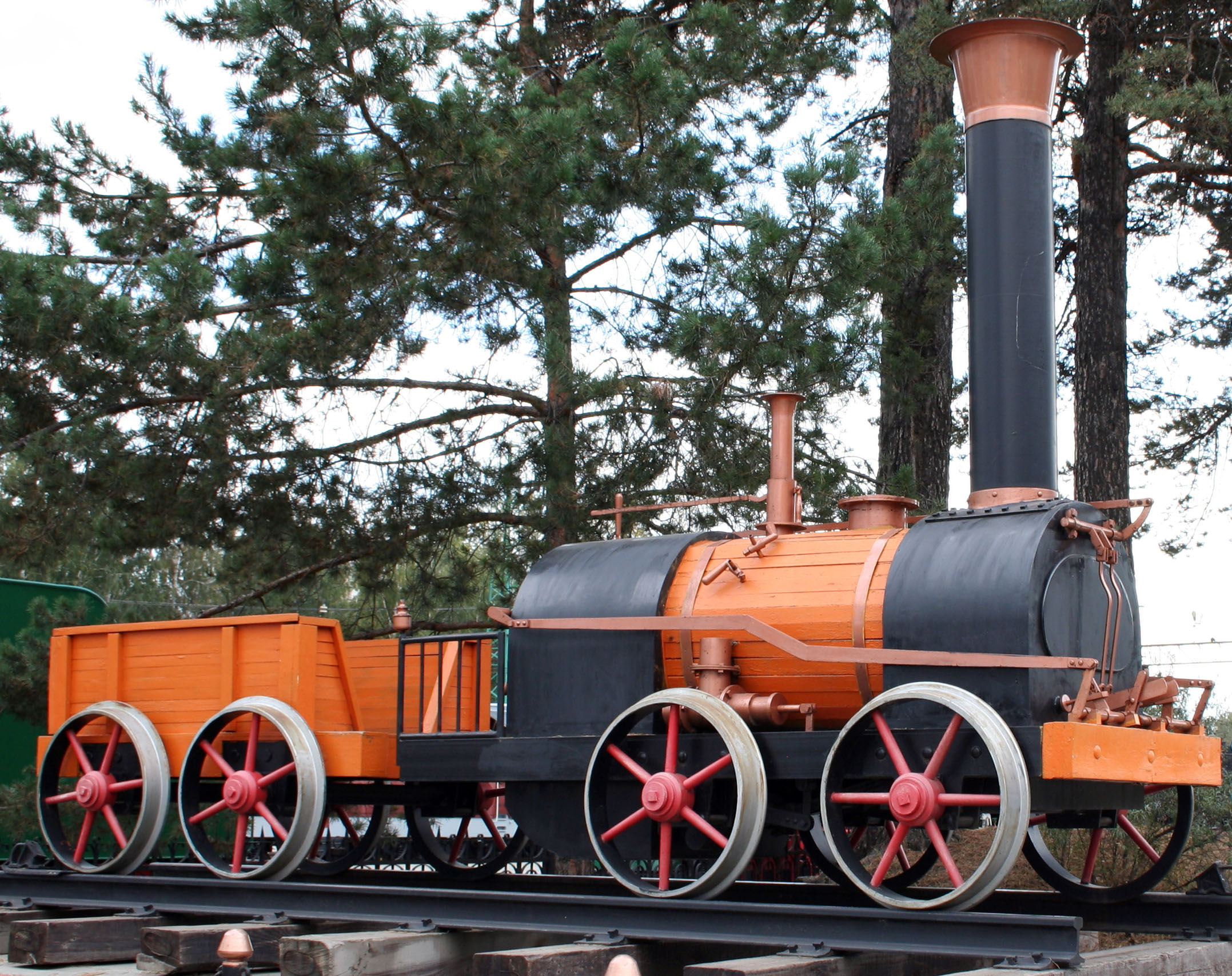
Model (2002) of the steam locomotive constructed by Cherepanov (1834)

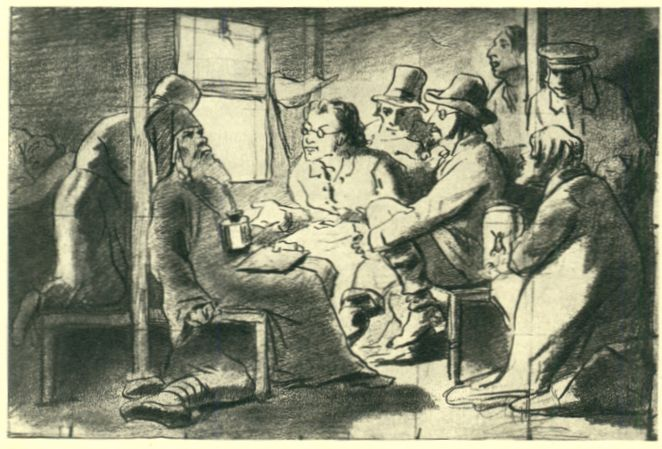
People of all ethnicities and walks of life would meet on Russian trains (sketch by Vasily Perov, 1880)

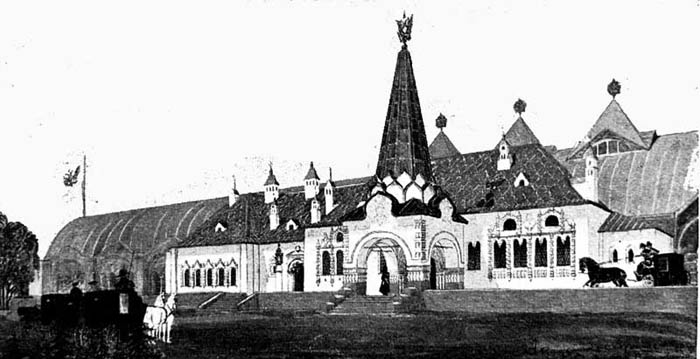
Tsarskoye Selo Imperial Station / Emperor railway station in Pushkin town 1913

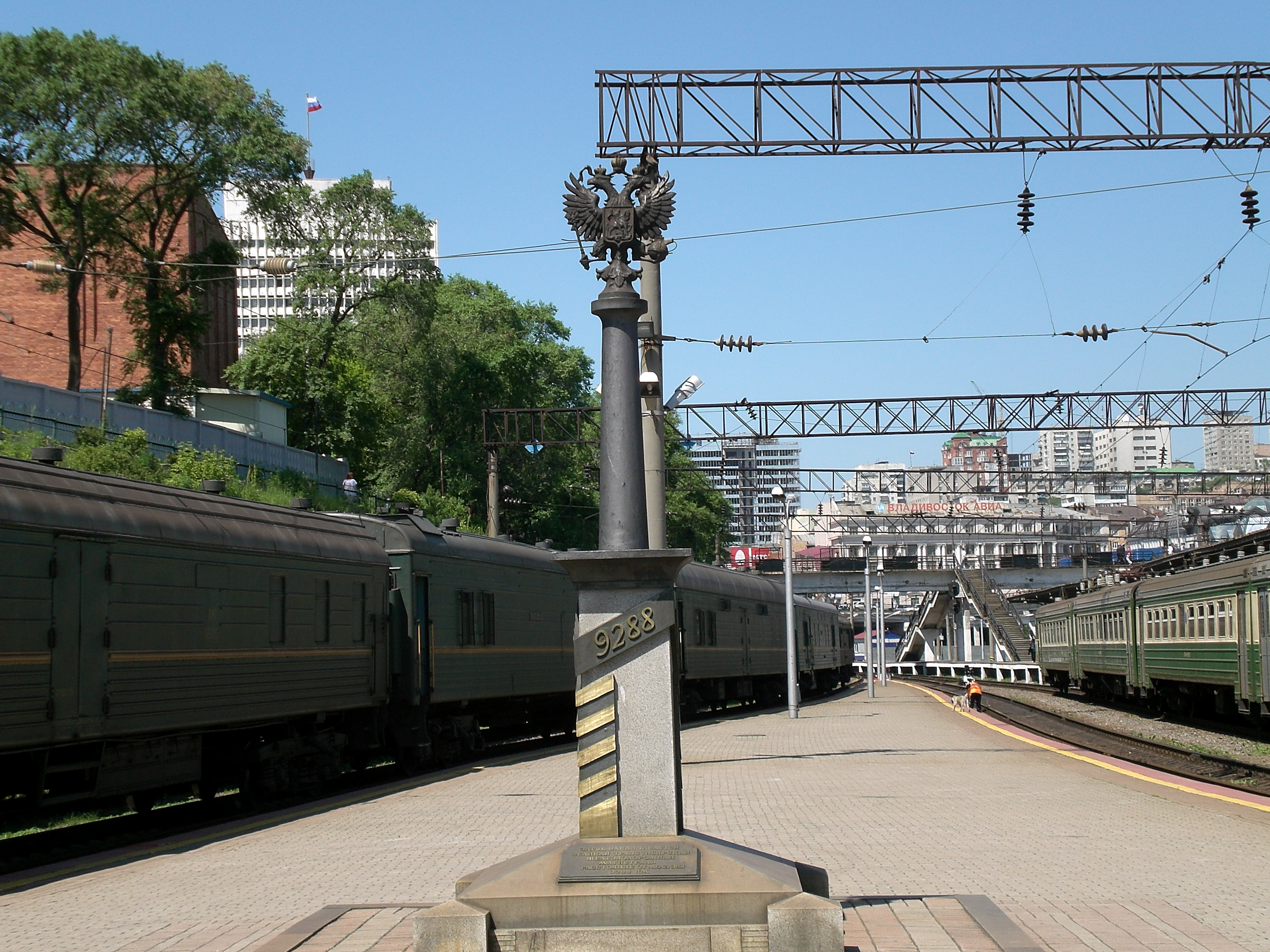
The marker for kilometre 9288, at the end of the Trans-Siberian Railway in Vladivostok

In the early 1830s Russian inventors father and son Cherepanovs built the first Russian steam locomotive. The first railway line was built in Russia in 1837 between Saint-Petersburg and Tsarskoye Selo, and called the Tsarskoye Selo Railway. It was 27 km (17 mi) long and linked the Imperial Palaces at Tsarskoye Selo and Pavlovsk. Track gauge was 6 feet (1830 mm). This railway has been described as a "toy" railway, as it had no economic, political or social impact on the Russian Empire.

The Warsaw–Vienna railway in Congress Poland started operating in 1845, and fully opened in 1848, with 327,6 km length of track. It ran from Warsaw to the border with the Austrian Empire and used the standard European gauge (1,435 mm (4 ft 8 1/2 in)), as opposed to all other railways in the Russian Empire which used the broad gauge (1,524 mm or 5 ft), hence it formed a system physically separated from other Russian railways.

The Department of Railways, later part of the Ministry of Communication Routes, was created in the Russian Empire in 1842 in order to oversee the construction of Russia's second major railway line, the Moscow–Saint Petersburg Railway. The railway linked the imperial capital Saint-Petersburg and Moscow and was built between 1842 and 1851. Track gauge was 1,524 mm (5 ft) and this became the Russian standard gauge. From 1853 to 1862, a line was built from Saint Petersburg to Warsaw, thus connecting with Western Europe.

Year	Miles of track
1838	16
1855	570
1880	14,208
1890	19,011
1905	31,623
1917	50,403

On 15 June 1865, an edict of Alexander II established the Ministry of Communications, which absorbed the Department of Railways. In the 1860s and 1870s, Pavel Melnikov, Russia's first Minister of Communications, played a key role in the expansion of the railway network throughout European Russia.

In the 1880s and 1890s, the Trans-Caspian railway connected Russian Empire's Central Asian provinces (now, independent states of Turkmenistan and Uzbekistan) with the Caspian port of Krasnovodsk; by 1906, Central Asia was directly connected by the Trans-Aral Railway with European Russia via Kazakhstan. The Trans-Siberian Railway connecting European Russia with the Russian Far East provinces on the Sea of Japan was built between 1891 and 1916. The Russian-built system included the Chinese Eastern Railway, short-cutting across China's Manchuria; later on, its southern branch was connected with other Chinese railways. During the First World War and especially the Russian Civil War more than 60% of the Russian railway network and more than 80% of the carriages and locomotives were destroyed. With the German and Turkish blockade of the Russian Baltic and Black Sea ports, the Trans-Siberian Railway acquired a new significance as the lifeline connecting Russian Empire to its World War I allies. To provide a shorter connection to the Entente powers, a railway was constructed to the newly built Arctic ice-free port of Murmansk as well (1916).

Tsar Nicholas II clearly attached great importance to railways since he had his own railway line constructed from Vitebsky railway station to the Emperor railway station in Pushkin town in 1902. It ran parallel to the main line of the Tsarskoye Selo Railway and then branched south west at the village of Kouzmino. It was designated for members of the imperial family and representatives of foreign powers.

During World War I Russia used a mix of light and heavy armoured trains. The heavy trains mounted 4.2 inch or 6 inch guns while the light trains were equipped with 76.2mm guns.

=== Soviet Russia (1917–1922) ===
The railways and railway workers played a major role during the Russian Revolution. For example, the Tashkent Soviet was founded on 2 March 1917 by thirty five railway workers. The Transcaspian Government was founded by Menshevik and Social revolutionary railway workers in revolt against the Bolsheviks who ran the Tashkent Soviet and existed from July 1918 to July 1919.

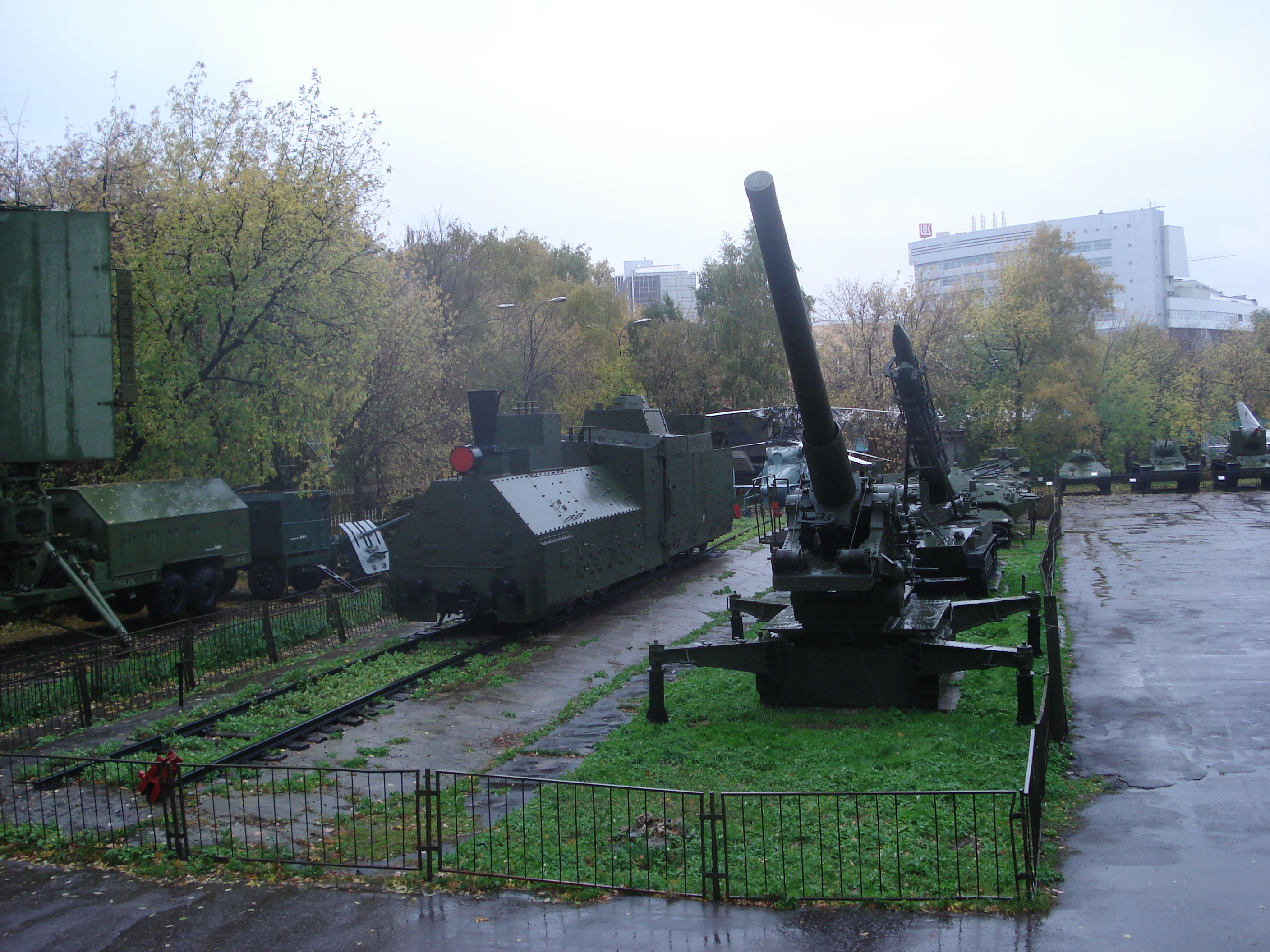
0-8-0 Armoured Russian locomotive class O Ov 5067 at the Central Armed Forces Museum, Moscow

Tsektran (Central Administrative Body of Railways) was established in September 1920 as a fusion of the Commissariat of Transport, the Railway unions and the relevant political departments of the Bolshevik Party. Trotsky was put in charge.

Leon Trotsky spent much of the Russian Civil War on board his armoured train:

"During the most strenuous years of the revolution, my own personal life was bound up inseparably with the life of that train. The train, on the other hand, was inseparably bound up with the life of the Red Army. The train linked the front with the base, solved urgent problems on the spot, educated, appealed, supplied, rewarded, and punished ..."

The Revolt of the Czechoslovak Legion, a rebellion by returning Czech and Slovak prisoners of war on the Trans-Siberian Railway from prisoner-of-war camps in Siberia, posed a major threat to the RSFSR. One of the Red Army's most successful strategies in the war was to use trains to transport small contingents of troops, which allowed the Russians to win the Soviet–Ukrainian War and defeat the Volunteer Army during its advance towards Moscow.

=== Railways in the Soviet Union (1922–1991) ===
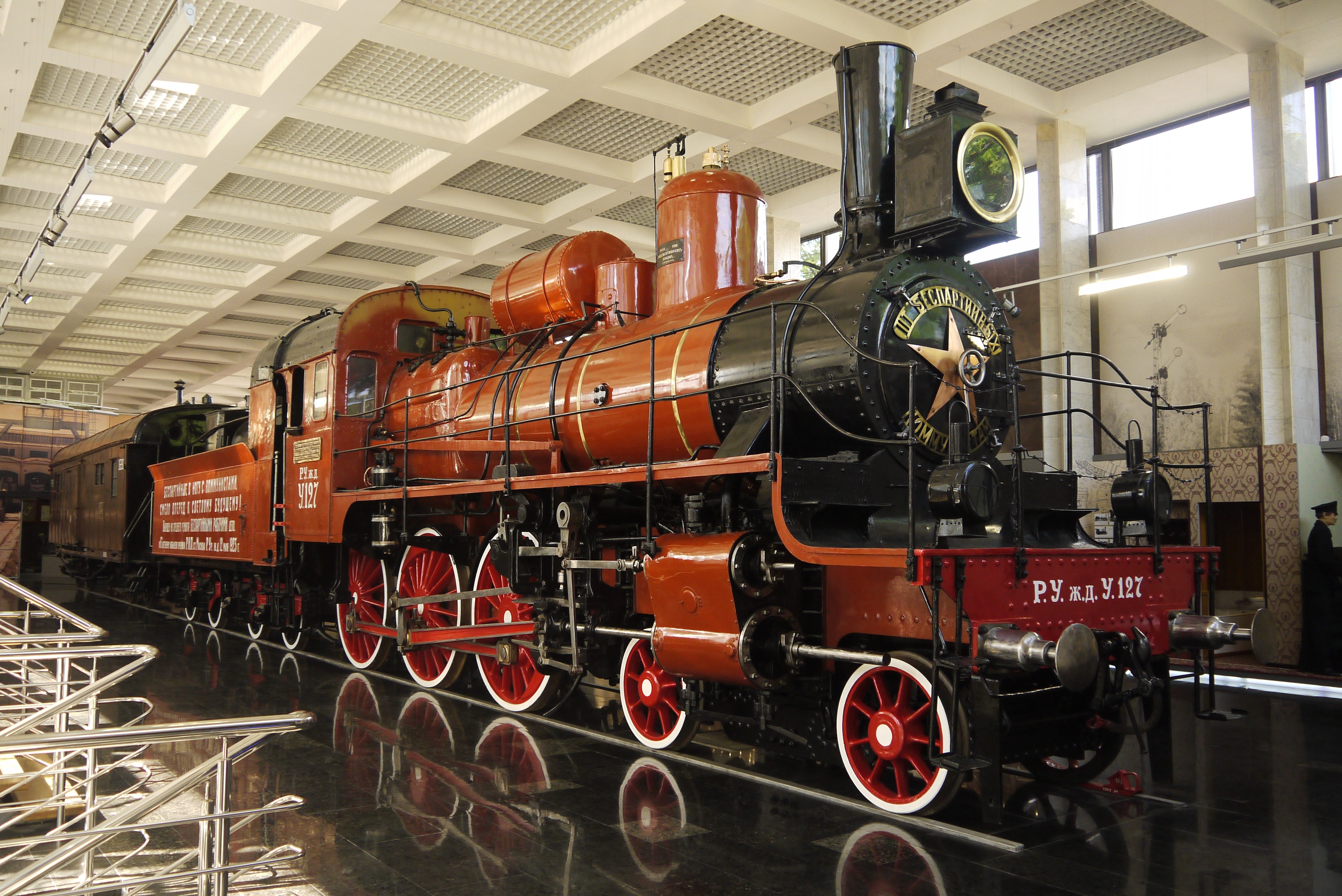
Russian locomotive class U - U-127 Lenin's 4-6-0 oil burning compound locomotive, currently preserved at the Museum of the Moscow Railway at Paveletsky Rail Terminal

After the foundation of the Soviet Union the People's Commissariat of Railways (after 1946 named the Ministry of Railways) expanded the railway network to a total length of 106,100 km by 1940. A notable project of the late 1920s and one of the centerpieces of the first five-year plan was the Turkestan–Siberia Railway, linking Western Siberia via Eastern Kazakhstan with Uzbekistan.

During the Great Patriotic War (World War II) the railway system played a vital role in the war effort transporting military personnel, equipment and freight to the frontlines and often evacuating entire factories and towns from European Russia to the Ural region and Siberia. The loss of mining and industrial centers of the western Soviet Union necessitated speedy construction of new railways during the wartime. Particularly notable among them was the railway to the Arctic coal mines of Vorkuta, extended after the war to Labytnangi on the Ob River; construction work to extend it all the way to the Yenisey continued into the 1950s, aborted with the death of Joseph Stalin.

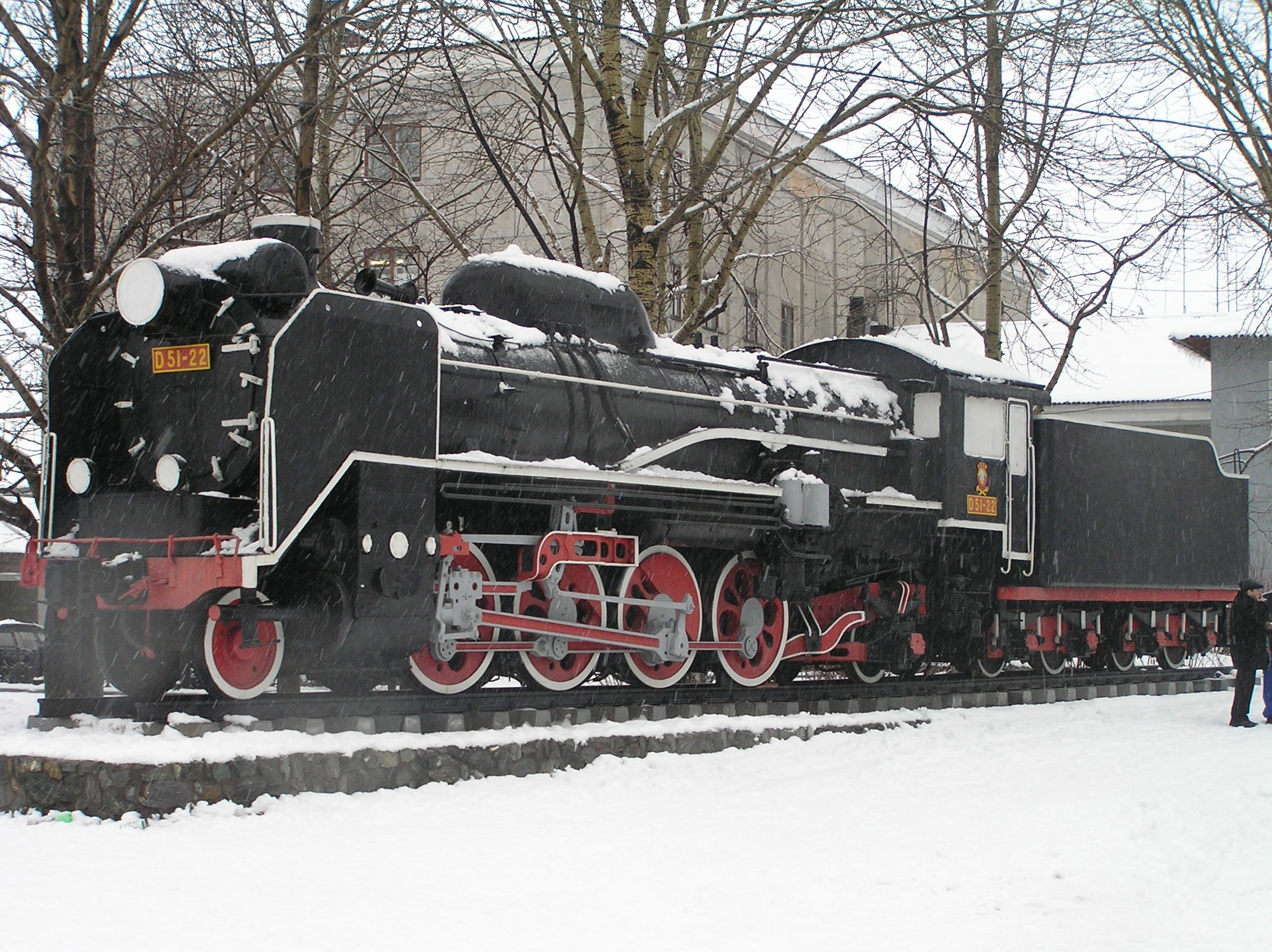
Japanese D51 steam locomotive outside the Yuzhno-Sakhalinsk Railway Station Sakhalin Island, Russia (2007)

As a result of the World War II victory over Japan, the southern half of Sakhalin Island was returned to Russia in 1945. The 1,067 mm (3 ft 6 in) railway network built by the Japanese during their forty years of control of Southern Sakhalin now became part of Soviet Railways as well (as a separate Sakhalin Railway), the only 3 ft 6 in (1,067 mm) rail system within USSR (or today's Russia).

After the war the Soviet railway network was re-built and further expanded to more than 145,000 km (90,000 mi) of track by major additions such as Baikal Amur Mainline.

In the late 1960s the official gauge was redefined as 1,520 mm (4 ft 11 27/32 in) (i.e. 4 mm smaller) to allow better running without regauging rolling stock. The difference is within the normal tolerance so little immediate effect was shown and conversion took place progressively over 30 years as lines were maintained and upgraded. See 1520 mm railways redefinitions.

==== Electrification ====
While the former Soviet Union got a late (and slow) start with rail electrification in the 1930s it eventually had success in electrification in terms of the volume of traffic under the wires.

=== Russian Federation (1991 to present day) ===
Following the Collapse of the Soviet Union its railway system broke up into national railway systems of various former Soviet republics. Due to the ensuing depression, Russian freight traffic fell by 60% and has (as of 2010) not yet fully recovered.

In 2003 a vast structural reform was implemented in order to preserve the unity of the railway network and separate the functions of state regulation from operational management: On 18 September 2003, Decree No.585 of the Russian Government established the Russian Railways Public Corporation with state holds 100% of the shares.

The Cape gauge railway system of Sakhalin is being re-gauged to 1,520 mm (4 ft 11 27/32 in).

The current CEO of the company is Vladimir Yakunin. There are plans for partial privatization of the company in the future in order to raise much needed capital from the sale of shares. In 2009, Russian Railways stated that it expected a loss of 49.7 billion rubles in the year, compared with a profit of 13.4 billion rubles in 2008, and that it planned to shed 53,700 jobs from its workforce of 1.2 million.

In 2007, as part of a liberalisation process, Russian Railways established First Freight Company which holds a large number of freight wagons; in 2010, it was announced that Second Freight Company would be established, and remaining freight wagons transferred to that.

In July 2010, RZD signed an agreement for Siemens to provide rolling stock (240 EMUs) and upgrade 22 marshalling yards.

== Economic history ==
=== Government ownership ===
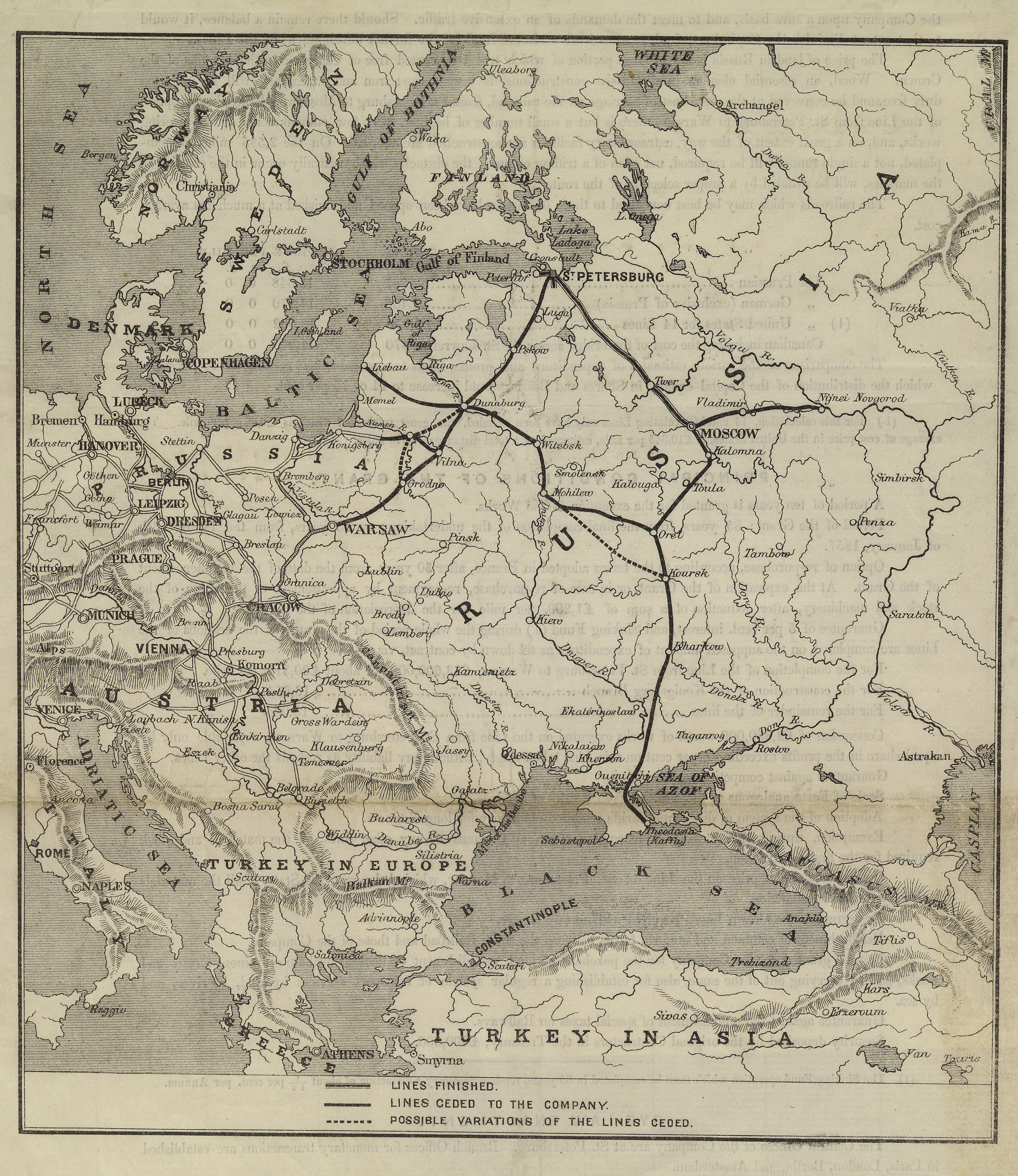
Moscow to St Petersburg Railway, 1857

The first initiative in developing railways came following a meeting called by Tsar Nicholas I held on 13 January 1842 where he announced that the state would build the St Petersburg-Moscow railway. This decision came about after seven years of consideration. With characteristic slowness in committing himself, Nicholas I nevertheless proceeded with determination, aiming to overcome problems relating to having his capital some distance from the centre of his empire. Built in addition to the roads and canals that previous generation had built to link the two cities, Nicholas I envisaged that the railway would provide a more reliable method of transport particularly during the climatic extremes of summer and winter. Although influenced by military considerations, the railway would help bring food grown in the South to the less fertile northern areas. The plan for this first railway also offered the possibility of creating a network which could extend to the Lower Volga and the Black Sea, developing Moscow as a railway hub similar to Chicago in the United States.

Due in part to the poor financial state of the Tsarist government and their inability to finance railroad construction, by the early 1880s all railroads were private companies. But then as private railroads got into financial difficulty, the government took over some of them, resulting in mixed system of private and government railways. However, the government had guaranteed payment of interest and dividends on the securities of the private railroads resulting in a strong incentive for government takeover of failing railroads.

Sergei Witte was able to turn around some money-losing railroads and make them profitable. The remaining private companies had strong incentive towards more efficient operation in order to avoid nationalization. The result, according to one observer was that: "Russian railroads gradually become perhaps the most economically operated railroads of the world." Profits were high: over 100 million gold rubles a year to the government (exact amount unknown due to accounting defects).

After the Russian Revolution (1917) all railroads become government owned by the Soviet Union. During the earlier years, the Soviet railroads were financially in the red, but by 1965 they returned a profit to the Soviet Government of 13.3% on their capital investment. By 1980 profits had nearly halved to 7.1%.

=== Subsidy to passengers ===
Passenger travel on Soviet and Russian railways has long been subsidized by profits from freight transportation. In 2000 (post-Soviet), long-distance passengers only paid 55% of the cost while commuter train passengers paid only 15% of costs. But six years later (2006) these figures were about 80% and 50% due mainly to increased fares. Current policy (2010) is to eliminate such subsidy and thus commuter fares have drastically increased. As a result of this plus the economic crisis, commuter passengers have decreased and many trains have been removed from service. Another problem is that it's estimated that over one-third of passengers cheat and pay no fare at all (including bribing the ticket inspector).

== Freight traffic: growth and decline ==
=== Imperial period: ton-km ===
In 1916, just at the start of First World War (during which Germany invaded Russia) freight traffic on Russian Railway reached nearly 100 billion tonne-kilometers (traffic on United States railways was about five times higher). But due to the war, a few years later Russian traffic had crashed to about 20 billion ton-km. Then the civil war started with the reds fighting the whites, which delayed the recovery of rail traffic. The reds (communists) won, resulting in the formation of the Soviet Union (USSR) and a new chapter in railway development.

=== Soviet period: ton-km ===
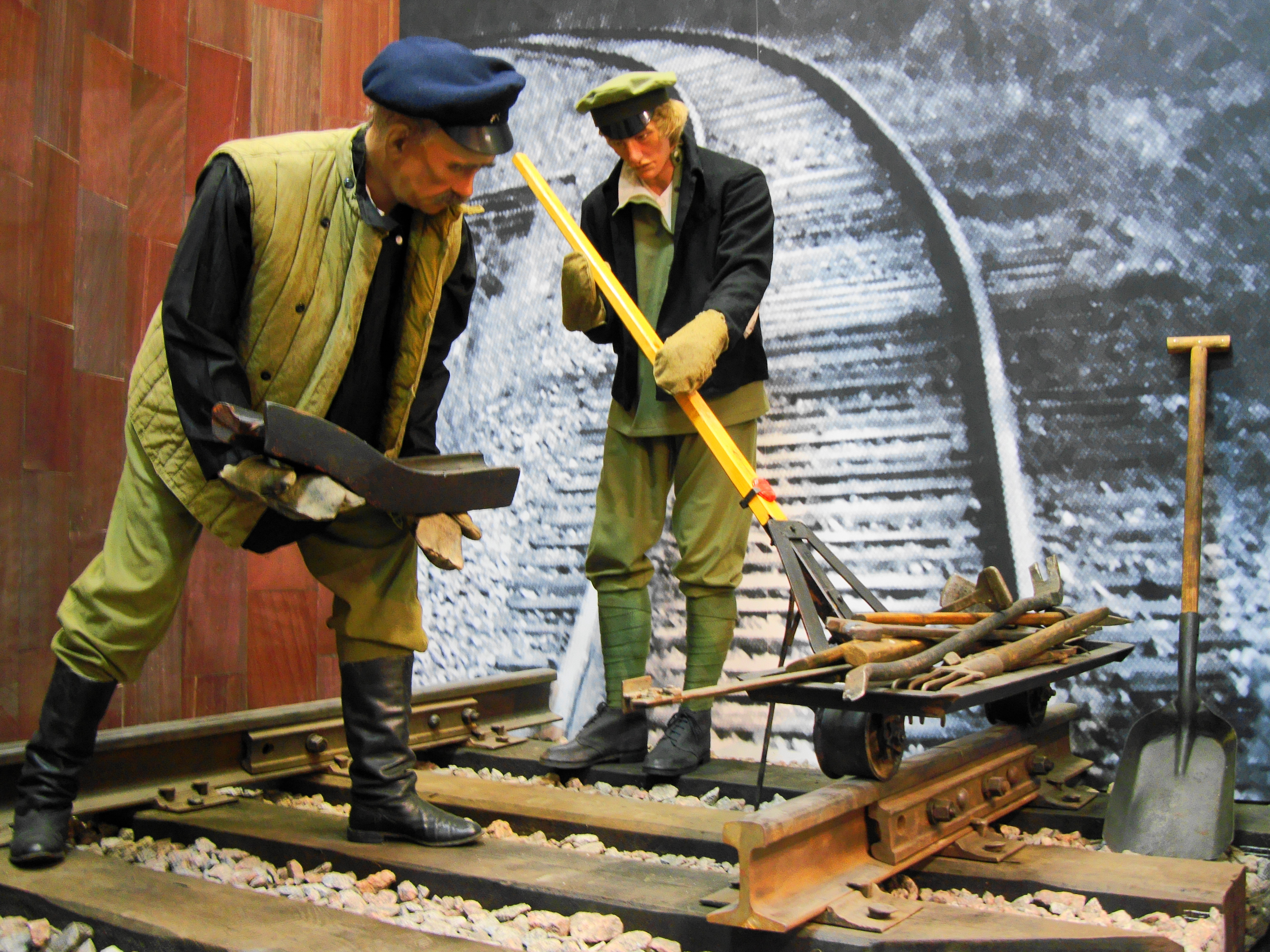
A life size diorama of Russian track workers repairing railway tracks at the Museum of the Moscow Railway

The USSR rebuilt its rail system and industrialized with five-year plans. As a result, railroad freight grew about 20 times from 20 to 400 billion tonne-km by 1941. But then disaster struck again: World War II in 1941 when Nazi Germany invaded the Soviet Union. In the first year or so of the war, traffic plummeted to about half its prewar value. But then the USSR started restoring and constructing railroads during wartime so that by the end of the war about half of the lost traffic had been recovered. After the war was over it took a few more years to restore the railroads and get back to the pre-war level of traffic.

Then the USSR embarked on a series of more five-year plans and rail traffic rapidly increased. By 1954 their rail freight traffic (about 850 billion tonne-km) surpassed that of the United States and the USSR then hauled more rail freight than any other country in the world. Rail freight continued to rapidly increase in the USSR so that by 1960 the USSR was hauling about half of all railroad freight in the world (in tonne-km) and they did this on a rail system consisting of only 10% of the world's railway kilometrage. The status of hauling half the world's rail freight continued for almost 30 years but in 1988 rail freight traffic peaked at 3852 billion tonne-km (nearly 4 trillion). And then, a few years later in 1991, the Soviet Union fell apart and its largest republic, the Russian Federation, which then hauled about 2/3 of the traffic of the former USSR, became an independent country.

For the USSR in 1989 (shortly before the collapse), the railroads hauled nearly eight times as much ton-km of freight by rail as they did by highway truck. For the US, it was only 1.5 times as much by rail. Thus trucks in the USSR played a far lesser role in hauling freight than they did in the US, leaving the railroad as the basic means of freight transportation. In 1991 a law was passed which declared that railroads were the basic transportation system of the USSR.

=== Russian Federation: ton-km ===
Prior to 1990, traffic in the Russian Republic (of the USSR) was about two-thirds of what was hauled by the USSR (since all the other former republics of the USSR hauled about 1/3 of the rail freight of the USSR). This amounted to significantly more rail freight than any country in the world. However the severe depression in Russia in the 1990s after the collapse of the Soviet Union (actually beginning in the last year of its existence), resulted in rail freight falling to about 40% of its 1988 value to its low point in 1997 (1020 billion ton-km).

Russia was no longer number one for rail freight. In 1993 Russia was overtaken by the United States and the next year, 1994, it was overtaken by China So for rail freight, Russia had fallen from a strong first place to third and remains so to this day even though there was partial recovery to 2116 ton-km by 2008, which is still well below the peak of 2606 ton-km in 1998. For a graph ('til 2002) (in Russian) see.

By 2010 there was reported to be a growing share of railroad freight being diverted to highway trucks.

== Notable people associated with the Russian Railways ==
- Sergei Witte, Director of Railway Affairs in the Ukraine; Minister of Ways and Communications in Imperial Russia
- Fyodor Funtikov, President of the Transcaspian Government
- Leon Trotsky, People's Commissar of Army and Navy Affairs under Vladimir Lenin
- Lazar Kaganovich, People's Commissar of Communication Routes under Josef Stalin

== See also ==
- Russian Railway Museum
- Tsarskoye Selo Railway
- The Museum of the Moscow Railway
- Emperor railway station in Pushkin town
- Moscow Rizhskaya railway station
- Upper Volga railway
- Vikzhel negotiations
