= Reginald Teague-Jones =

Reginald Teague-Jones MBE (30 July 1889 – 16 November 1988) was a British political and intelligence officer. He was active in the Caucasus and Central Asia during the Russian Civil War. For the last 66 years of his life he was known as Ronald Sinclair. Under that assumed name, he authored two published accounts of his travels and adventures in Asia and the Middle East.

== Early life ==
Teague-Jones was born in Lancashire. He was brought up in St. Petersburg, capital of Imperial Russia. His father was a language teacher and died when Reginald was still a child. He was educated at a German-run school that specialised in languages where he learned French, German and Russian, and at Bedford School between 1905 and 1907. He later spent two years studying at King's College London, but left without taking a degree.

== Indian intelligence officer ==
In 1910, at the age of 21, he joined the Indian Police and was soon transferred to the (British) Indian government's Foreign and Political Department, an organisation that had trained earlier players in the so-called Great Game, the clandestine struggle for influence in Central Asia between the Russian and British empires during the 19th and early 20th centuries.

Here he became involved in intelligence work on the North West Frontier, undertaking missions in disguise and adding Persian to his knowledge of languages.

== World War I and the Russian Civil War ==
In 1917 he was moved to military intelligence at G.H.Q. Delhi and given responsibility for the Persian Gulf. The war in the Middle East was now entering a critical stage with the collapse of Russian forces following the October Revolution and the creation of a power vacuum in the Caucasus.

As 1918 dawned, a reinvigorated Turkish force, the Ottoman Army of Islam under Enver Pasha began advancing on Baku, much to the alarm of the British, who envisaged Enver's army crossing the Caspian, sweeping through Transcaspia (Russia's southernmost Central Asian possession) and on to India by way of Afghanistan.

Teague-Jones was now despatched on an intelligence-gathering mission to Transcaspia via the British garrison commanded by Wilfrid Malleson at Meshed to find out what resistance to the Turks could be expected. Crossing the Kopet Dagh mountains in disguise in July, he spent the next six months between Meshed, Baku and the Transcaspian capital Ashkhabad, where he found the Bolsheviks had been overthrown days earlier and replaced by the Transcaspian Government, claiming allegiance to the Social Revolutionaries.

He was appointed British political representative in Ashkhabad as a small British force, the Malleson Mission, arrived from Persia to aid resistance against the Turks and to fend off attacks by the Bolsheviks from Tashkent. Here he remained until the withdrawal of this force began early in 1919

== The 26 Baku Commissars ==
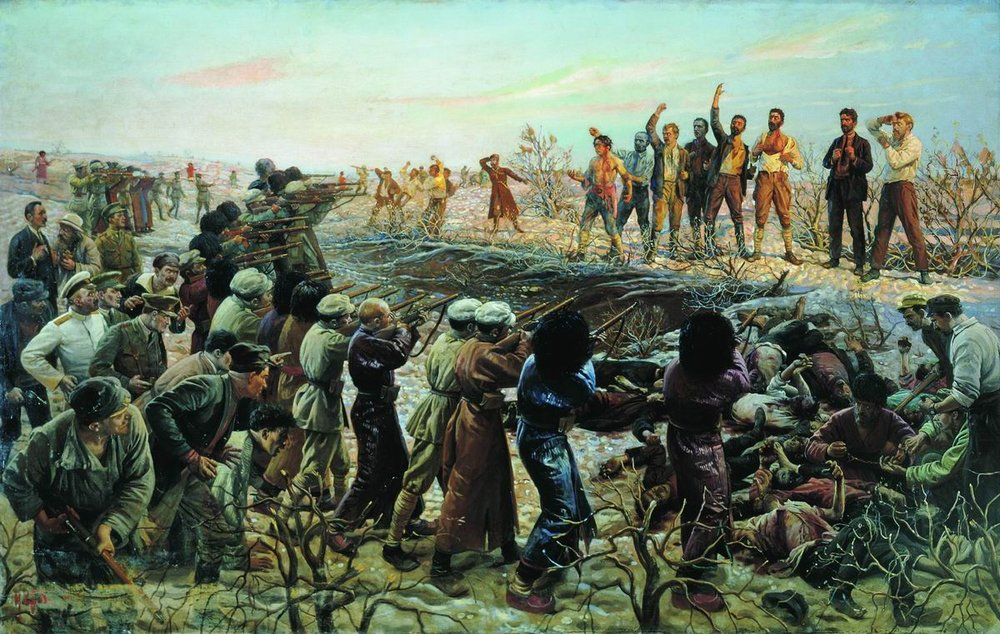
Isaak Brodsky's The Execution of the Twenty Six Baku Commissars depicting the Soviet view of the execution.

As a result of his involvement in Transcaspian politics, his name became linked to the murder of the 26 Baku Commissars. The commissars had escaped across the Caspian after the fall of Baku in September 1918, and had been taken prisoner by White Russians at Krasnovodsk. They were then shot in the desert between Krasnovodsk and Ashkhabad in mysterious circumstances on 20 September.

In 1919, and again in 1922, the Social Revolutionary lawyer Vadim Chaikin claimed these murders had been carried out under the direct orders of Teague-Jones. In November 1922 Teague-Jones produced a 1,500-word rebuttal of Chaikin's claims which was passed by the British Foreign Office to the Soviet Commissariat for Foreign Affairs.

However, Chaikin's version of events was later endorsed by Trotsky and was upheld by Soviet historians until the collapse of the USSR.

== Change of identity ==
Teague-Jones changed his name in 1922 and all reference to him in Foreign Office files ceased after the end of 1922. For the next 66 years until his death, he was known as Ronald Sinclair.

In 1926 he undertook a trip by car across Persia, ostensibly in the interests of a British business consortium. The trip is widely held to have been undertaken in a Ford Model A, although this fact is disputed as the model did not go on sale until December 1927. His account of this trip, Adventures in Persia: To India by the Back Door was published in 1988 just before his death. As Ronald Sinclair, he later served as Vice-Consul in New York from 1941 until his retirement shortly after the war, possibly in collaboration with the newly-formed Office of Strategic Services.

It has been suggested that his change of identity was intended either to protect him from Soviet vengeance for the death of the Baku commissars, or to provide cover for future intelligence operations. Evidence that he had worked for MI5 was found in his possessions at the time of his death, and it seems likely that both his 1926 Persian trip and his diplomatic position in New York were fronts for intelligence work.

== Death ==
He died on 16 November 1988, as Ronald Sinclair at a private nursing home in Plymouth, England. An obituary appeared in The Times on 22 November, alerting Peter Hopkirk, a historian of the Great Game, who was researching Teague-Jones at the time. As a result, Hopkirk immediately wrote a second obituary for The Times revealing his true identity.

== References / Bibliography ==
- Hopkirk, Peter (1990): The Spy Who Disappeared (Introduction and epilogue), Victor Gollancz
- Hopkirk, Peter (1994): On Secret Service East of Constantinople, Oxford University Press
- Teague-Jones, Reginald (1988): Adventures in Persia: To India by the Back Door, Victor Gollancz
- Teague-Jones, Reginald (1990): The Spy Who Disappeared, Victor Gollancz
- Ter Minassian, Taline (2012): Reginald Teague-Jones, Paris: Grasset (a new work by a professor of Russian history at the INALCO (Institut national des langues et civilsations orientales) in France, which is dedicated to Brian Pearce for his help with the research).
- Ter Minassian, Taline (2014): The Most Secret Agent of Empire: Reginald Teague-Jones, Master Spy of the Great Game, translated from the French by Tom Rees, London: Hurst Publishers.
- Ter Minassian, Taline (2014). "Some fresh news about the 26 commissars: Reginald Teague-Jones and the Transcaspian episode". Asian Affairs. 45 (1): 65–78. doi:10.1080/03068374.2013.872360. S2CID 159979990.
- Trotsky, Leon Between Red and White

A large number of Teague-Jones's papers are in the British Library, under various headings, and can be found via the Access to Archives website.
