= Battle of Dushak =

1918 battle between British India and the Soviet Union in Turkmenistan

- Part of the Malleson Mission, and the Russian Civil War
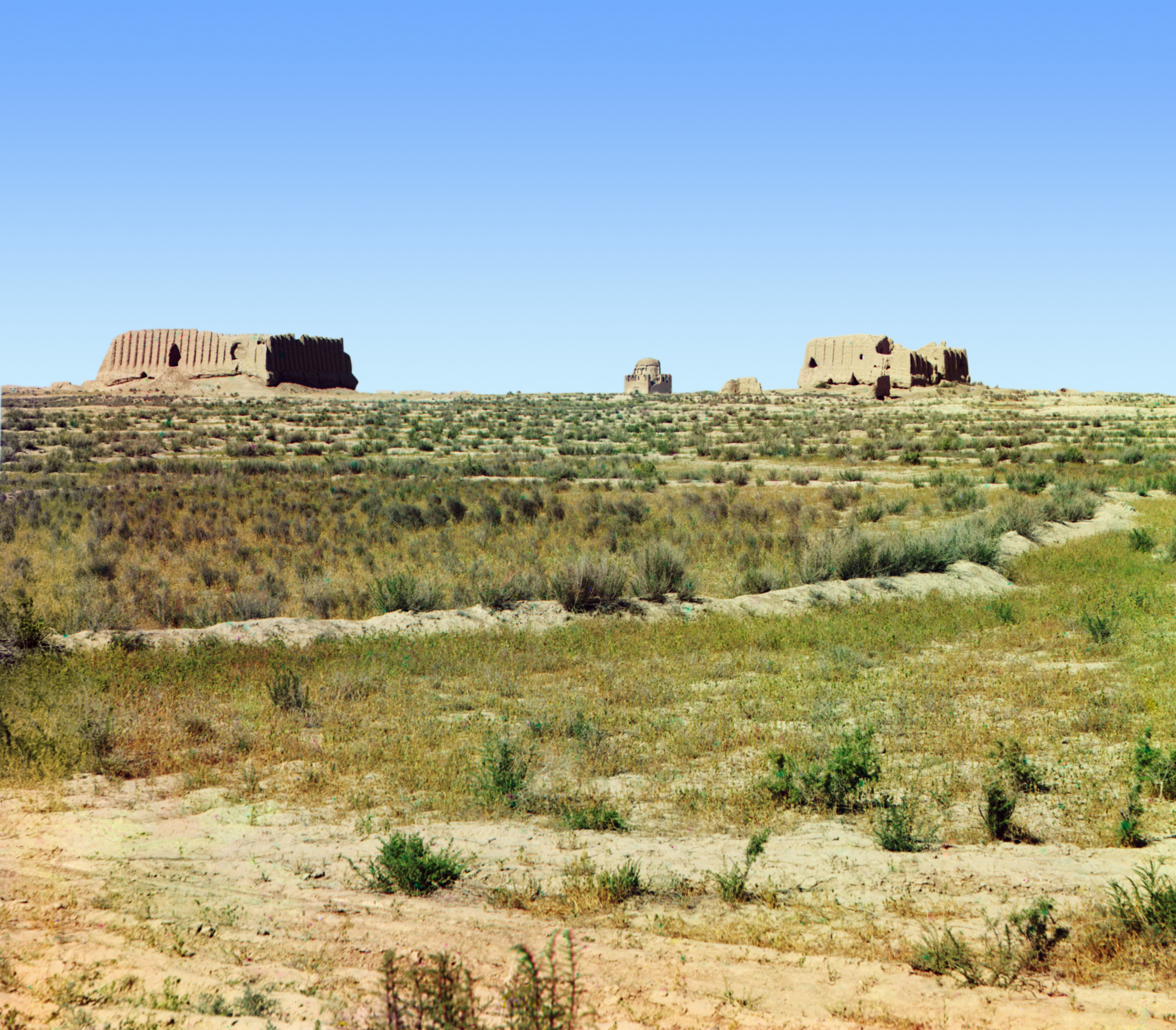
- The oasis near Merv, Turkmenistan
Date	October 1918
Location	Dushak, Transcaspian Region (modern-day Turkmenistan)
Result	White coalition victory
Territorial changes	Merv and the oasis area ceded back to the Transcaspian Government

Belligerents
India; White movement	Soviet Russia

Commanders and leaders
Major-General Wilfrid Malleson	Unknown Soviet commander

Units involved
19th Punjabis; Transcaspian Infantary	Soviet Red Army

Strength
c. 1,000 (Note: ~600 British Indian troops 400 Transcaspian irregulars)	c. 3,000 Soviet Red Army soldiers

Casualties and losses
47 killed 139 wounded	~1,000 casualties

The Battle of Dushak (Russian: Битва при Душаке, romanized: Bitwa pri Dushake) occurred in October 1918 as part of the British Malleson Mission during the Russian Civil War. British Indian troops, under the command of Major-General Wilfrid Malleson, engaged Soviet Red Army forces near the town of Dushak in the Transcaspian Region (modern-day Turkmenistan). The battle was a key confrontation in the Allied intervention aimed at halting the spread of Bolshevik influence in Central Asia.

== Background ==
The preparations involved significant logistical challenges for Malleson. Although the supply line from Meshed to Ashkhabad was operational, the British force still relied heavily on the Transcaspian Committee for provisions, medical support, and transportation. There were doubts about the committee's ability to manage a crisis due to poor staff work and governance. Despite cordial relations between the British and the committee, the latter faced internal issues, particularly distrust between members of proletarian and bourgeois backgrounds.

British-Transcaspian military cooperation remained strong, with former Russian officers holding key positions in the Transcaspian army and showing admiration for British and Indian troops. However, maintaining secrecy about the attack was difficult, as Bolshevik sympathizers in Ashkhabad and Merv, along with deserters, could leak information. To counter this, the British spread disinformation about large reinforcements and military advancements.

== The attack on Dushak ==
During the battle, two armored trains attempted to leave the station, but a well-aimed shell hit an ammunition wagon, causing a massive explosion that destroyed the station and killed many enemy troops. Encouraged, Transcaspian and Turkman soldiers returned to loot the wreckage. Amid the chaos, the Bolsheviks regrouped with reinforcements from Tedzhen, and their armored trains moved back toward the station. Only the Punjabis, despite heavy casualties, continued to fight, launching a bayonet charge. Reinforcements from the 28th Cavalry arrived, pushing the enemy back and capturing war material. Despite the desire to pursue the retreating enemy, the British withdrew to Kaakha due to the disorganization of the Transcaspian troops. British and Indian forces suffered moderate losses, with the 19th Punjabis losing all their British officers and many soldiers. Total casualties included 47 killed and 139 wounded among the Punjabis, 17 casualties in the 28th Cavalry, while the enemy suffered approximately 1,000 killed and wounded.

== Aftermath ==
The Bolshevik defeat at Dushak proved significant, as it allowed the Transcaspian government to regain control of Merv and the surrounding oasis area, alleviating an economic crisis that threatened their stability. However, the disorganized command structure between the British and Transcaspian forces was inadequate for the situation. Malleson's troops, although under Oraz Sirdar operationally, lacked unified leadership. To address this, Malleson requested Delhi to expedite the appointment of a senior officer. Brigadier-General G. Beatty, a seasoned leader from campaigns in France and Egypt, was appointed and expected to arrive by late November.

== See also ==
- 19th Punjabis
- Allied intervention
- Merv, Turkmenistan
