= Turkestan Army (Armed Forces of South Russia) =

Location of the Transcaspian Oblast.

The Turkestan Army (Russian: Туркестанская армия, romanized: Turkestanskaya armiya) was a White army during the Russian Civil War, which operated from January 1919 to February 1920, in the Transcaspian Oblast area.

== History ==
The Turkestan Army was established on January 22, 1919, by order of the Supreme commander of the AFSR, Lieutenant-General Anton Denikin, as an integral part of the Armed Forces of South Russia. The army was formed with the financial and logistical support of the British military mission in Turkestan, under the leadership of Major General Wilfrid Malleson at the counter-revolutionary Transcaspian Government in Ashgabat. When in April–July 1919, the British troops were withdrawn from Turkestan, the leadership of the Turkestan Army was transferred to the command of the AFSR.

On 1 May 1919, the Turkestan Army had some 7,000 infantry and 2,000 cavalry.

The Turkestan Army was supported by General Junaid Khan, the dictator of the Khanate of Khiva and a leader of the Basmachi movement who had an army of some 12,000 soldiers. At the suggestion of the AFSR's headquarters, the Turkestan Army was to march from the Krasnovodsk district to Tashkent and Verny, to link up with the Basmachis.

However, in May–July 1919 the Red Transcaspian Front of the Turkestan SFR, warned of this attack, advanced and took on May 21 Baýramaly, on May 23 Merv, on May 24 Serhetabat, on July 7 Tejen, and on July 9 the capital Ashgabat. The Turkestan Army was thrown back to the Caspian Sea and on October 19, 1919 suffered another severe defeat at the Aydyn station (1000 soldiers surrendered into captivity). The Turkestan army was again seriously defeated in the district of Kazan-Jika on December 2–7, 1919.

The change of the Turkestan Army's commander between July and October did not bring the desired success. The defeats continued one after the other. Finally, by the beginning of 1920 the Army was reduced to a small group, encircled in the area of Krasnovodsk. On February 6, 1920, the Turkestan Army's remnants were evacuated from Krasnovodsk to Dagestan on the AFSR's Caspian Flotilla's ships, and the city was occupied by the Red Army. A small part of the Army was transported to Persia (Iran) by British ships.

The Turkestan Army ceased to exist and was dissolved.

== Commanders of the Turkestan Army ==
- Lieutenant-General Ippolit Savitsky, 10.04 – 22.07.1919;
- Lieutenant-General Aleksander Borovsky, 22.07 – 08.10.1919;
- Lieutenant-General Boris Kazanovich, October 1919 – February 1920.

== See also ==
- Turkestan Army (RSFSR)
- Turkestan Legion
