= Fyodor Funtikov =

Fyodor Adrianovich Funtikov
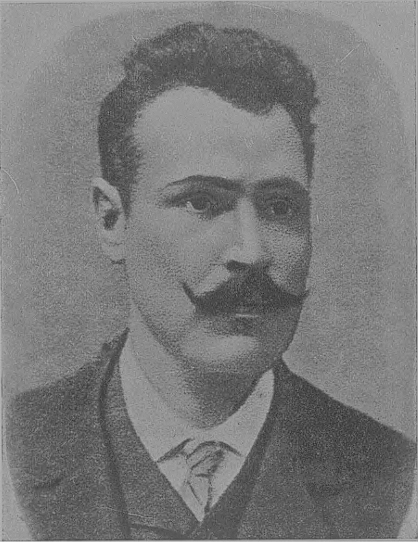

Chairman of the Trans-Caspian Government
- In office 12 July 1918 – 15 January 1919
- Preceded by: Position established
- Succeeded by: Position abolished

Personal details
- Born: 1875
- Died: 5 May 1926 (aged 50–51) Baku, Azerbaijan SSR
- Party: Socialist Revolutionary Party

Fyodor Adrianovich Funtikov (Russian: Фёдор Адриа́нович Фу́нтиков; 1875/76 – 5 May 1926) was Chairman of Provisional Executive Committee of the Transcaspian Region Soviet during the period July 1918 – Jan 1919. He was a Socialist Revolutionary railway worker, who in his role as head of the Transcaspian Government was held responsible for the execution of the 26 Baku Commissars.

== Biography ==
Funtikov was a locomotive engineer and a member of the Socialist Revolutionary Party since 1905. On 11–12 July 1918 he became one of the leaders of the anti-Bolshevik uprising of workers in Ashgabat. On 12 July, he was elected the head of the Transcaspian Government by the Ashgabat strike committee, composed mainly of workers, Socialist-Revolutionaries and Mensheviks.

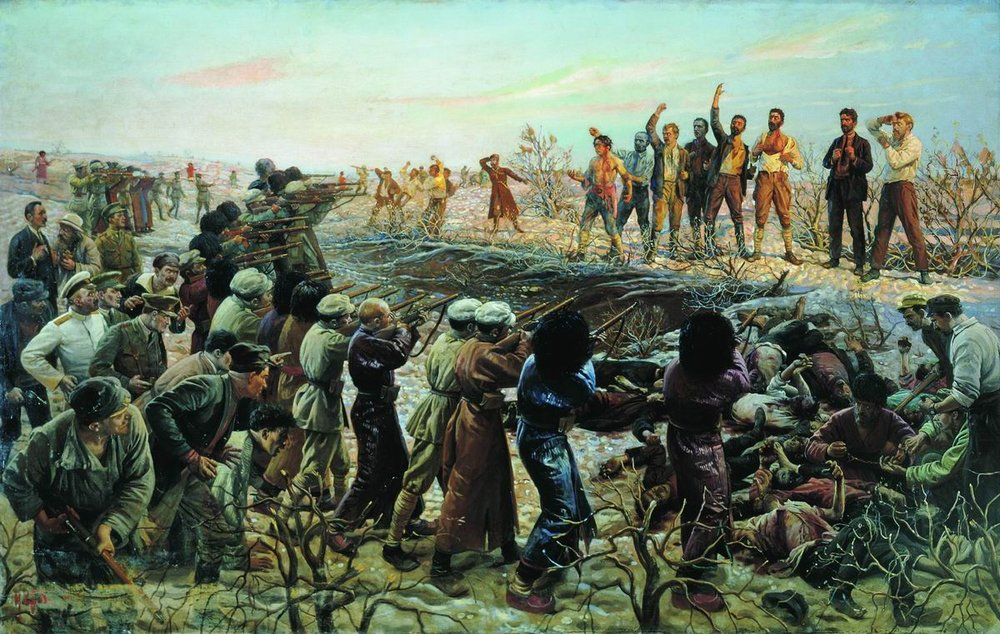
Isaak Brodsky's The Execution of the 26 Baku Commissars, depicting the Soviet view of the execution.

After the defeat of the rebels near Chardzhou on 28 July 1918, Funtikov turned for help to the head of the British military mission in Mashhad (northeastern Iran), General Wilfred Malleson, with whom a formal agreement was signed on 19 August 1918. Malleson sent 2,000 Indian sepoys led by Colonel Nollis, who took command of the combined forces. As a result, the Funtikov government fell into a certain dependence on the British, which subsequently gave Soviet historiography reason to consider it as a "puppet". On 19 September 1918, Funtikov participated in a meeting in Krasnovodsk, where it was decided to shoot the 26 Baku Commissars.

On 2 January 1919, after the unrest of workers in Ashgabat, the Provisional Government was ousted and replaced by a "Committee of Public Salvation" of five persons who arrested Funtikov on 15 January 1919 on charges of corruption. On 2 March 1919, Funtikov testified to the former member of the SR Central Committee, Vadim Chaikin, who, on behalf of the Central Committee, conducted an investigation into the participation of party members in the murder of commissars. He said of his role in the execution: "I was aware of this upcoming case, but did not consider it possible to prevent it ... the execution was previously decided at the insistence of the English mission."

Soon after, Funtikov was released and left for Russia as a private individual. Funtikov hid on his farm near Tsaritsyn until he was betrayed to the Cheka by his daughter. He was then put on trial in Baku on 26 April 1926. The trial was well publicised. Funtikov was described by N. Smirnov as "a man of medium height, dressed in a worn chuiku and boots, with a thick beard on a slightly elongated face." Mir Bashir Gasimov attended the trial. He was charged with rebellion against the Soviet regime, relations with foreign states and the organization of terrorist acts. The court hearings were held in the hall, which accommodated one and a half thousand people, and, in addition, powerful loudspeakers were installed on one of the squares in Baku. He pleaded guilty to counter-revolutionary activity and organising an uprising to seize power in the Transcaspian region. He admitted linking up with the British command and in the shooting of 9 Ashgabat commissars. However he denied any involvement in the execution of the Baku commissars. The central newspapers Pravda and Izvestia, as well as Dawn of the East and Baku Worker regularly and fully covered the process.

On 27 April 1926 he was found guilty and sentenced to death. After his application for clemency was rejected, Fyodor Funtikov was executed on 5 May 1926.
