= Trudovaya mysl' (Merv) =

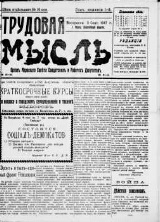
Trudovaya Mysl, 1917, issue 81

Trudovaya mysl’ (Russian: Трудовая мысль, 'Labour Thought') was a daily newspaper published from Merv, Transcaspian Oblast, Russia. It was published by the Merv Soviet of Workers and Soldiers Deputies. It had a Socialist Revolutionary-Menshevik political line. D. Bergelson was the publishing editor of the newspaper as of May 1917. From the 74th issue (August 21, 1917), V. I. Ladydin was the editor of the newspaper. Copies were sold for 10 or 15 kopeks.

In January 1918 the Merv Soviet of Workers and Soldiers Deputies issued a special resolution whereby a new editorial board of Trudovaya Mysl’ was set up, which included the Bolsheviks V. V. Malkov, I. K. Kallenichenko and S. G. Geivandov. Trudovaya Mysl’ became an important organ for the Bolsheviks in Merv. The editors of the newspaper dedicated significant effort to articles on the Leninist line on the national question. Trudovaya Mysl’ continued to be published until the end of October 1918.
