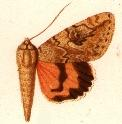

Scientific classification
- Kingdom: Animalia
- Phylum: Arthropoda
- Class: Insecta
- Order: Lepidoptera
- Superfamily: Noctuoidea
- Family: Erebidae
- Genus: Catocala
- Species: C. timur

Binomial name
- Catocala timur Bang-Haas, 1907

= Catocala timur =

Timur underwing

Species of moth

Catocala timur, the Timur underwing, is a moth of the family Erebidae. It is found in Transcaspia.

The wingspan is about 40 mm.

== Subspecies ==
- Catocala timur timur (Transcaspia)
- Catocala timur richteri Wiltshire, 1961 (Southern Iran)
