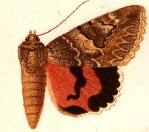

Scientific classification
- Kingdom: Animalia
- Phylum: Arthropoda
- Class: Insecta
- Order: Lepidoptera
- Superfamily: Noctuoidea
- Family: Erebidae
- Genus: Catocala
- Species: C. amabilis

Binomial name
- Catocala amabilis Bang-Haas, 1907

= Catocala amabilis =

Species of moth

Catocala amabilis is a moth of the family Erebidae. It is found in Transcaspia.
