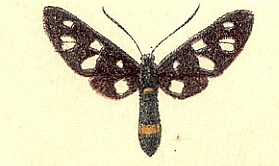

Scientific classification
- Domain: Eukaryota
- Kingdom: Animalia
- Phylum: Arthropoda
- Class: Insecta
- Order: Lepidoptera
- Superfamily: Noctuoidea
- Family: Erebidae
- Subfamily: Arctiinae
- Genus: Amata
- Species: A. caspia

Binomial name
- Amata caspia (Staudinger, 1877)

Synonyms
- Syntomis caspia Staudinger, 1877; Syntomis caspia martinierici Bryk, 1941; Syntomis caspia martini-erici Bryk, 1941; Syntomis minuta A. Bang-Haas, 1910; Amata (Syntomis) banghaasi Obraztsov, 1966; Amata (Syntomis) minutissima Obraztsov, 1966; Syntomis banghaasi schachti de Freina, 1994

= Amata caspia =

Species of moth

Amata caspia is a species of moth of the subfamily Arctiinae first described by Otto Staudinger in 1877. It is found in south-western Russia, the southern Ural Mountains, the Caucasus, Transcaspia, Kazakhstan and Turkey.

The wingspan is 19–28 mm. Adults have been recorded on wing in June and July.
