= Mir Bashir Gasimov =

Soviet Azerbaijani revolutionary and politician (1879–1949)

- Mir Bəşir Qasımov
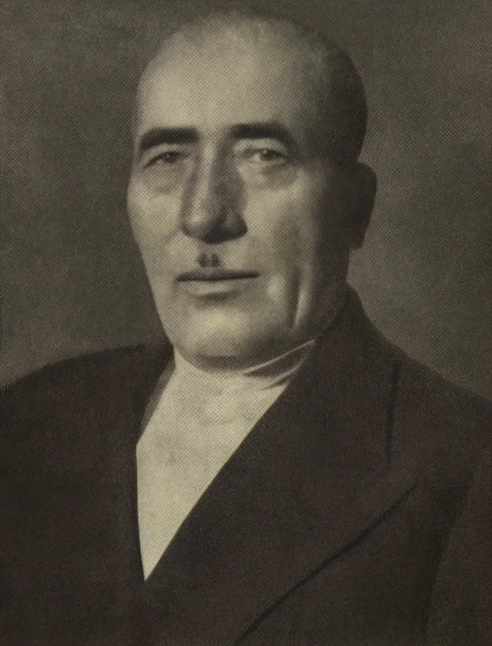

Chairman of the Presidium of the Supreme Soviet of the Azerbaijan SSR
- In office 21 July 1938 – 23 April 1949
- Preceded by: Position established
- Succeeded by: Nazar Heydarov

Deputy Chairman of the Presidium of the Supreme Soviet of the Soviet Union
- In office July 1938 – 23 April 1949
- Chairmen: Mikhail Kalinin; Nikolai Shvernik

Chairman of the Central Executive Committee of the Azerbaijan SSR
- Acting
- In office June 1937 – 18 July 1938
- Preceded by: Sultan Majid Afandiyev
- Succeeded by: Position abolished

People's Commissar of Social Security of the Azerbaijan SSR
- In office 19 January 1935 – June 1937

Personal details
- Born: 1879 Dashbolagh, East Azerbaijan Province, Persia
- Died: 23 April 1949 (aged 69–70) Baku, Azerbaijan SSR, USSR
- Party: Communist Party of the Soviet Union

Mir Bashir Fattah oghlu Gasimov (Azerbaijani: Mir Bəşir Fəttah oğlu Qasımov; 1879 – 23 April 1949) was a Soviet and Azerbaijani revolutionary and statesman. Twice receiver of Order of Lenin and two more orders.

== Revolutionary ==
Mir Bashir Fattah oghlu Gasimov was born in Dashbolagh, Persia (present-day Ardabil Province, Iran) in 1879 to a poor family of peasants. Gasimov started his revolutionary work in 1898, as soon as he started work at the Balakhani oil factory in Russian Azerbaijan. He joined the Bolshevik faction of the Russian Social Democratic Labour Party the same year and participated in the 1905 Russian Revolution as a member of combat brigades of Baku Bolshevik organization.

In 1917–1918, he represented communists in Baku and Lankaran. After the fall of the Soviet-oriented Baku Commune in Azerbaijan, Gasimov engaged in underground political activity. At the First Congress of the Workers' (Bolshevik) Party of Azerbaijan in February 1920, he was elected to the Central Committee.

Gasimov was one of the organisers of the uprising against the Musavat government in the Azerbaijan Democratic Republic and one of the key figures that contributed to the Sovietization of Azerbaijan on 28 April 1920. He was initially one of the followers of Nariman Narimanov's national communism policy in the Azerbaijan SSR.

== Statesman ==
One day after the establishment of the Soviet rule in Azerbaijan, Gasimov was already a member of the Revolutionary Committee of Baku. He soon advanced in his career in the Communist Party and was appointed the Deputy Chair of the Central Executive Committee of the republic, serving in that position in 1921–1924 and in 1931–1935. In 1925 he attended the trial of Fyodor Funtikov, the former accused of ordering the execution of the 26 Baku Commissars.

In 1935–1937, he served as People's Commissar of Social Welfare of the Azerbaijan SSR and later, in 1937–38, was the acting Chair of the Central Executive Committee of Azerbaijan. From 1938 until his death, he headed the Presidium of the Supreme Council of the Azerbaijan SSR in addition to being the Deputy Chair of the Presidium of the Supreme Soviet of the USSR. He is known to have opposed Zangezur becoming part of the Armenian SSR.

He was also chosen as a deputy of the Supreme Soviet of the USSR in the first and second convocations.

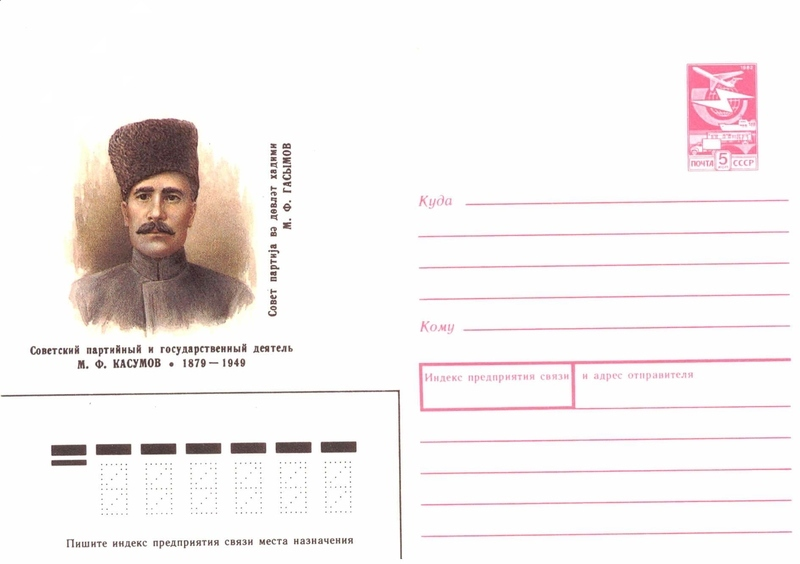
Soviet 1989 commemorative envelope for Mir Bashir Gasimov

The city of Tartar was named Mirbashir after his death in 1949 and retained that name until 1991. There is a street named after him in Baku. Today Gasimov is still seen as a significant political figure by members of the Azerbaijan Communist Party and other left-wing politicians.
