= Sultan Majid Afandiyev =

Azerbaijani revolutionary and statesman

- Sultan Məcid Əfəndiyev
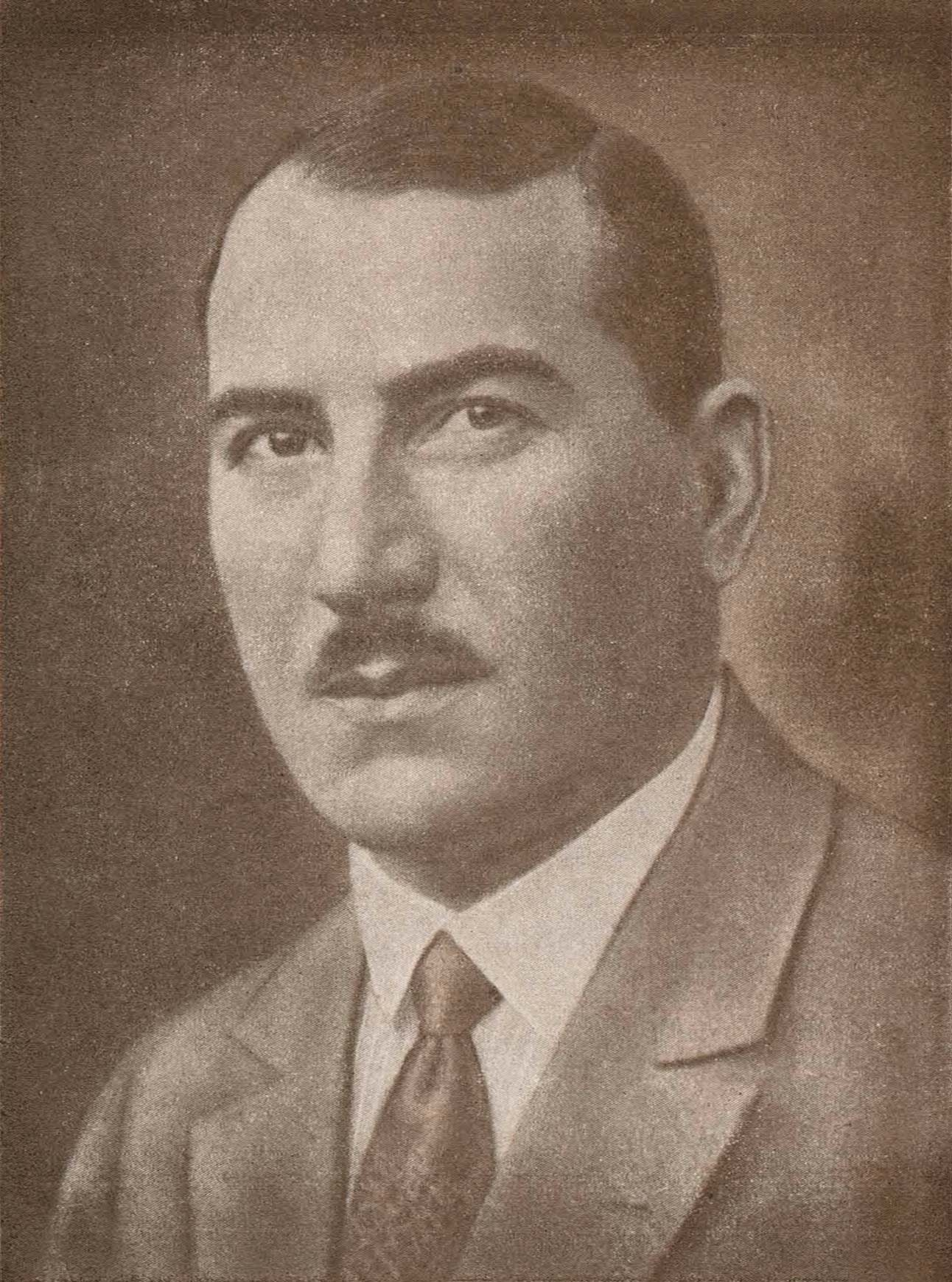

Chairman of the Central Executive Committee of the Azerbaijan SSR
- In office 15 December 1931 – June 1937
- Preceded by: Gazanfar Musabekov
- Succeeded by: Mir Bashir Gasimov

Personal details
- Born: May 26, 1887 Shamakhi, Baku Governorate, Russian Empire
- Died: April 21, 1938 (aged 50) Baku, Azerbaijani SSR, Soviet Union
- Party: Communist Party of the Soviet Union
- Education: Kazan State University

Sultan Majid Afandiyev (Azerbaijani: Sultan Məcid Əfəndiyev; Russian: Султан Меджид Эфендиев), also spelled Efendiyev (May 26, 1887 – April 21, 1938), was an Azerbaijani revolutionary, statesman, and one of the founders of the Communist Party of Azerbaijan. He was repressed during the Great Terror.

== Early years ==
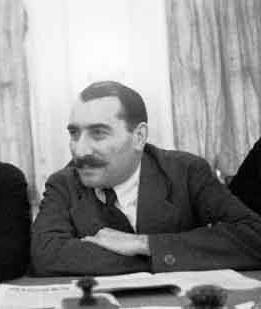
Sultan Majid Afandiyev. Moscow, 1936

He was born at Shamakhi in what is modern day Azerbaijan as the son of a merchant and grandson of the Transcaucasian mufti. His family moved to Baku after his father's trading business collapsed after the 1902 Shamakhi earthquake.

In Baku, Afandiyev was sent to a six-year school, where he first became acquainted with Marxism. Beginning in 1902, Afandiyev participated in the revolutionary movement of Azerbaijan—at that time a region of the Russian Empire. In 1904 he became a member of the Russian Social Democratic Labour Party.

It was then that he first encountered the police, when they were conducting a search of the apartment of a social democrat he knew. Afandiyev arrived at the apartment with leaflets, which he tore up and threw into the corner of the room. However, a neighbor of the apartment owner, who was an agent of the tsarist secret police, picked up the scraps of the leaflet and informed the police search team that Afandiyev had torn them up and thrown them away. Afandiyev spent several hours at the police office, where he was interrogated and then released.

Afandiyev went on to become one of the organizers of the Hummet party, created to bring Muslim workers into the social democratic movement, in 1904. As he recalled:

Due to the shortage of Turkic workers at that time, I performed the duties of an agitator, propagandist, organizer, newspaper worker, etc. In addition, I had to carry out all the work on printing proclamations and illegal newspapers in the Turkic language using hectographic and typographic methods.

Afandiyev took part in the general strike of Baku workers in 1904, acting as one of the delegates at the negotiations with oil industrialists, which took place on December 30, 1904 in the building of the Electric Power Joint-Stock Company. The December strike of Baku workers resulted in the adoption of the first collective bargaining agreement in the history of the Russian labor movement (the so-called "fuel oil constitution") that reduced working hours, raised wages and provided further benefits for oil workers.

During the 1905 Revolution, Afandiyev distinguished himself as a publicist. Following that strike Afandiyev also participated in the 1906 strike by textile workers at the firm owned by Zeynalabdin Taghiyev, speaking passionately at meetings and rallies of textile workers. This two-month strike ended with the governor-general and the factory administration fulfilling the demands of the strikers.

Afandiyev then enrolled in the Medicine Department of Kazan State University. During his studies he was imprisoned for participating in student protests. After qualifying as a physician in 1915 he began working as a doctor at a medical observation point ("cholera barracks") in the village of Vasilsursk in the Nizhny Novgorod Governorate until he was transferred to Vladimirovka.

== Soviet career ==
After the February Revolution of 1917, he became a member of the Baku Council, the Hummet Committee, and the Russian Social Democratic Labour Party (Bolsheviks) Committee. During the Civil War he took part in the defense of Astrakhan.

From 1918 to 1931 Afandiyev was appointed to many roles: Commissar for Muslim Affairs of the Transcaucasus of the Narkomnats of the RSFSR, deputy chairman of the Central Bureau of the Congress of the Peoples of the East, member of the executive committee of Baku Council, Extraordinary Commissioner of the Central Committee of the Azerbaijan Communist Party ("AKP"), Commissar of Ganja Province (where he led the suppression of the anti-Bolshevik rebellion in Ganja), member of the Central Executive Committee, People's Commissar of Lands, People's Commissar of Revolutionary Commissariat of Azerbaijan Soviet Socialist Republic ("ASSR"), member of Central Committee of VKP(b) (All-Union Communist Party of the Bolsheviks), member of Transcaucasian Regional Committee of VKP(b) (All-Union Communist Party of the Bolsheviks), Bureau of the Central Committee of the AKP, member of the Central Executive Committee of the USSR, Deputy Chairman (and from 1931) the Chairman of the Central Executive Committee of the Azerbaijani SSR, and one of the chairmen of the Central Executive Committee of the Transcaucasian Soviet Federative Socialist Republic.

== Arrest and execution ==
At the 22nd Baku Party Conference, held in May 1937, Afandiyev was accused of harboring enemies of Soviet power. The resolution adopted following the conference included a clause on the insincere behavior of Afandiyev, Hamid Sultanov and other communists and the investigation of their "case". On June 5, speaking at a meeting of the 13th Congress of the AKP, Afandiyev rejected the charges brought against him. Mir Jafar Baghirov, the first secretary of the Central Committee of the AKP, and Yuvelian Sumbatov-Topuridze, minister of internal affairs of the ASSR, demanded that he confess to anti-Soviet, counterrevolutionary activities.

Baghirov's principal accusation against Afandiyev was that "you sent your so-called relatives in quotation marks to Moscow, giving them a statement on the leadership of the Central Committee of the CP(b) of Azerbaijan." During the debate, Baghirov recalled that Afandiyev mentioned the name Mahammad Amin Rasulzade in one of his articles in 1924. Afandiyev explained this by the requirement to observe “historical truthfulness”, in response to which Baghirov said: “Comrades, whose language is this? Comrades, this is the language of Trotsky.” Other delegates to the congress also made accusations. Thus, the chairman of the Council of People's Commissars of the republic, Huseyn Rahmanov, said:

Afandiyev tried to recognize the most evil enemy of the Azerbaijani people, Mahammad Amin Rasulzade, as his leader. Otherwise, it is impossible to explain why he called Rasulzade his comrade... To call him his comrade and to consider that he fought in the Baku organization to pacify the so-called national hatred is a pure counter-revolutionary trick and it is not accidental on the part of Afandiyev”.

On June 24, he was arrested by the NKVD. At the end of the month, the Chairman of the Central Executive Committee of the USSR Mikhail Kalinin requested information about the circumstances of Afandiyev’s case, but Baghirov reported that he had been removed from his post and arrested for counterrevolutionary activity.

According to witnesses, he was subjected to severe beatings by the employees of the Azerbaijani NKVD, who demanded the testimony they needed from him. Nevertheless, he held out for a long time, refusing to give the required testimony. According to D. P. Voznichuk, who worked as a senior prison warden, “…the chairman of the Central Election Commission Afandiyev and former employee of the agencies Pavlov were subjected to brutal beatings. Moreover, Afandiyev was beaten so hard that after interrogations he could only lie down…”. Former NKVD operative of Azerbaijan V. M. Dudiyev said:

Once I went into the office of Sonkin or Ermakov - I don’t remember exactly - there was operative Musatov Nikolay (a boxer), head of the department Tsinman, People's Commissar Sumbatov-Topuridze and some other employees. Among those arrested in the office was Afandiyev Sultan Mejid, he was sitting on the floor in a torn shirt, beaten all over. One of the investigators poured water on him and brought him to his senses, and at that time another one said to him: “Give evidence…”.

Finally, on August 16, 1937, Tsinman drew up a report:

The accused, Sultan Mejid Afandiyev, who was brought into the investigation, reported that although he did not participate in counter-revolutionary activities, given the current political situation, he was ready to testify about his participation in a nationalist counter-revolutionary organization.

Afandiyev did not plead guilty at the trial and retracted his testimony during the preliminary investigation, which he declared was false. On April 21, 1938, the Military Collegium of the Supreme Court of the USSR sentenced him to death. He was executed at Baku on April 21, 1938.

== Rehabilitation ==
On November 23, 1955, the Prosecutor General of the USSR Roman Rudenko sent a note to the Central Committee of the CPSU on the rehabilitation of S. M. Afandiyev. On November 30, members of the Presidium of the Central Committee of the CPSU decided by poll: "To accept the proposal of the Prosecutor General of the USSR, Comrade Rudenko, set out in the note of November 23, 1955, No. 214ls". Afandiyev was formally exonerated in 1956.

With the downfall and execution of Lavrentiy Beria in 1953 Baghirov not only lost his chief protector but found himself on trial for, among other things, bringing about the deaths of Afandiyev and other senior communists during the Great Purge. Baghirov's trial took place in April 1956. According to the verdict handed down on April 26 by the Military Collegium of the Supreme Court of the USSR, Afandiyev, like a number of other leading party and Soviet workers of Soviet Azerbaijan, was groundlessly arrested "on the criminal orders of Baghirov." The court also found that Agasalim Atakishiyev had taken part in falsifying the interrogation protocols in the Afandiyev case.
