= Malleson mission =

1918–19 Russian Civil War military action

Malleson mission British intervention in Transcaspia
- Part of the Allied intervention in the Russian Civil War
- Location of the Transcaspian Oblast
Date	11 August 1918 – 5 April 1919
Location	Transcaspian Oblast (now Turkmenistan)
Result	British withdrawal in March–April 1919

Belligerents
(Russian Soviet Federative Socialist Republic) Turkestan ASSR	India; Transcaspian Government (Russia) Turkestan Army

Commanders and leaders
(Russian Soviet Federative Socialist Republic) Turar Ryskulov	(British Raj) Wilfrid Malleson

Strength
c. 3,000 Bolsheviks (at Bairam Ali)	950 Anglo-Indians: 19th Punjabis; c. 1,000 Transcaspian Mensheviks (at Bairam Ali)

Casualties and losses
Unknown, but at least 1,000 casualties at Battle of Dushak	(British Raj) 86+ killed 213+ wounded

The Malleson mission or British intervention in Transcaspia was a military action by a small autonomous force of British Indian troops, led by General Wilfrid Malleson, operating against Bolshevik forces over large distances in Transcaspia (modern Turkmenistan) between August 1918 and April 1919, in the context of the Allied intervention in the Russian Civil War.

== Background ==
In 1918 Russian Turkestan was in chaos due to the Russian Civil War, with many factions engaged in conflict. The Bolshevik Tashkent Soviet was under attack from various groups, including cossacks, who had claimed independence for their respective regions. In addition, there were dealings between the White Russian forces and the British. Geopolitically, from the British point of view, the area was of interest to them because of its proximity to British India and Persia and their general sphere of influence. While the Russian Empire remained an ally this was not an issue for the British, but with the Bolshevik revolution of November 1917, it became one. To add to the complex situation, around 28,000 German and Austro-Hungarian soldiers were in the area, as prisoners of war. By June 1918, the British authorities in London and Delhi, and their Central Asian allies – particularly the Emirate of Afghanistan – still did not have a coherent or consistent vision for what they intended to do with the rapidly developing situation, and what their goals and methods would be if they were to attempt a political or military intervention in the region.

== The mission ==
Concerned about the Bolsheviks and German and Turkish military activity, the British Government decided to send a force to the area, from British India towards its base of operations in Meshed (Mashhad), Imperial Persia (modern Iran). The force was to be led by General Wilfrid Malleson. His mission was given as "to combat German and Turkish propaganda and attempts to organise men, railways and resources towards assisting hostile enterprises, aggression or active operations against us or our Allies."

=== Battle of Bairam Ali ===
Malleson instructed Reginald Teague-Jones to make preliminary contact with the Ashkhabad Committee, the group in control of the anti-Bolshevik Transcaspian Government which seized power in Ashgabat on 12 July 1918. The first military action occurred on 11 August, when two machine guns of the 19th Punjabis left the Persian town of Muhammabad and crossed the border to Artyk (Artik), where they boarded an armoured train and travelled along the Trans-Caspian railway towards Baýramaly (Bairam Ali, Bahram Ali) to assist local Transcaspian rebel forces in case of a Bolshevik attack.

The Bolsheviks indeed attacked the British-Indian and Transcaspian position at Bairam Ali on 12 or 15 August 1918 with about 3,000 troops. The Transcaspian force however, numbered round 1,000 men (largely Turkmen troops). They were quickly overrun by the Bolshevik army, with the local Transcaspian defenders abandoning their trenches, while the British-Indian machine guns and Punjabi infantry tried defending their armoured train. However, the usage of machine guns by the Indian detachment prevented complete rout, as per the official account.

“These men fired their guns till they became too hot to handle and, according to the Transcaspian account, inflicted 350 casualties on the enemy. Two of the Indian detachment were wounded and one of its machine guns had to be abandoned after two men had been burnt in trying to carry it out of action.”

Despite avoiding disaster, the Anglo-Indians and Transcaspians were compelled to march back without rest and little food and water for 3 days, retreating to Dushak along the railway line. The machine gun detachment returned to Muhammadabad in Persia due to disease and casualties.

=== Skirmishes at Kaka ===
After reconstituting his forces in Persia, Malleson moved about 500 men of the 19th Punjabi Regiment commanded by Knollys back across the border into Russian Turkestan, where a Transcaspian rebel force joined them at Kaka (Kaahkha) on 26 August. These local forces of some 1,000 Transcaspians were seen by the British as rather poor quality troops. They were commanded by a Turkmen chieftain, Oraz Sirdar.

The Bolshevik force, consisting of a good proportion of Austrian ex-POWs, attacked the British-Transcaspian force, but was repelled at Kushkh on the Afgan border. There was further action at Kaka, Turkmenistan, on 28 August, 11 September and 18 September, which saw a minor success for the British, encouraging the Transcaspian and British leadership in Meshed. Malleson then received some reinforcements with the arrival of the 28th Light Cavalry from Persia.

Malleson had further contact with the Ashkhabad Committee. They were eager to secure British funding and support, as they basically had no economy or method for raising funds. Two British colonels had secured dealings with another group, the Turkestan Union, a shadowy group who secured money from the British but whose motivation and levels of support were unclear. The group and the money were not seen again.

=== Battle of Dushak ===
At this point, Malleson, against the wishes of the Indian Government, decided to push further into Transcaspia and attack the Bolsheviks. The combined force completed a double night march, and engaged and defeated the Bolsheviks at Arman Sagad between 9 and 11 October and at the Battle of Dushak on 14 October. At Dushak, the British force suffered 54+ killed & 150+ wounded while inflicting 1,000 casualties on the Bolsheviks. The Anglo-Indian forces did most of the fighting, with the Transcaspian forces largely unreliable. A bayonet charge by the Punjabi infantry, as well as an attack by the 28th Cavalry, eventually drove off the Bolshevik forces. The Transcaspian forces retired to Kaakha, while the Bolshevik forces retired with their trains to Dushak but then pulled back further to Merv. The British occupied Tejend on 20 October. The Transcaspian force then went on to occupy Merv.

Armoured trains featured in the battles, the British/Transcaspians having two, the Bolsheviks three. Roads were not usable and vehicles did not have the range. Armoured trains, armed with cannons, were used for transport and to attack. However, with the end of World War I, one of the primary reasons for the mission, the threat from the Germans and the Turks, was no longer extant. Malleson, however, felt compelled to support the committee.

=== Committee resignation and Turkestan Army creation ===
By late 1918 the Ashkhabad Committee was starting to lose grip on the capital and asked for British assistance. Malleson had not supplied the committee with the funds he had promised. There was general rebellion in the capital and the Ashkhabad Committee resigned. On 1 January 1919 a new Committee of Public Safety was formed to govern Transcaspia, its composition of five people largely chosen by Reginald Teague-Jones. He appointed two Turkmen to the new committee, and it became more susceptible to British influence at this stage.

On 12 January, the British force came under attack from the Bolsheviks at Annenkovo, but defended the settlement with the loss of 12 killed and 38-39 wounded.

White Russian forces, from General Anton Denikin's Southern White Russian Army, started joining the Transcaspian army in small groups. The Transcaspian Government soon became linked with the White Russian Forces. Denikin eventually started having more control over the force, as more of his troops starting fighting with them. On 22 January 1919, the White Turkestan Army was created.

== British withdrawal ==
Malleson had spent some time planning how to extricate the British forces, which was a complex task. He had told the Committee confidentially that he was withdrawing; they had decided not to tell the public for fear it would cause panic. The Committee itself was alarmed at the news, though they had been making an effort to work with Denikin and the White Russians With Denikin's involvement in the Transcaspian, they now had a new sponsor. In order to safely withdraw, Malleson spread a rumour that the withdrawal was a feint for a flanking attack. The Bolsheviks were fooled by the ruse, and responded to the rumour by reinforcing their positions rather than pursuing the withdrawing British forces. The British forces, at this point numbering 950, began their withdrawal early in March. They had all left by mid April 1919. However, with the British gone, the Bolsheviks launched new offensives, gradually pushing the Transcaspian forces back. They were defeated by 1920, and the Bolshevik Tashkent Soviet regained control of the territory.

Dick Ellis served as an officer with the Malleson mission, writing his account in 1963 after he had retired.

== Battles and casualties ==
Battles and British casualties during the Malleson mission were as follows:

- 12/15 August 1918: Battle of Bairam Ali
- 28 August 1918: Defence of Kaakha – 5 killed
- 1918: Defence of Kushkh – 3 officers killed or wounded, 24 other ranks killed or wounded
- 15 September 1918: Skirmish near Kaakha – 3 killed
- 9–14 October 1918: Battle of Dushak – 54+ killed, 150+ wounded
- 12 January 1919: Defence of Annenkovo – 12 killed, 38-39 wounded
- (other): 10 killed in other skirmishes/actions

== Bibliography ==
=== Primary sources ===
- Milner Papers (1931) at New College Oxford, Volume 1 and 2. Written by Alfred Milner, 1st Viscount Milner, British Secretary of State for War (18 April 1918 – 10 January 1919).
- India Office Records (until 1947), London. Written by the government of British India.
- Ellis, Charles Howard "Dick" (1963). The British "Intervention" in Transcaspia, 1918–1919. Berkeley and Los Angeles: University of California Press. p. 186. (also known as "The Transcaspian Episode", written by a participating British officer)

=== Literature ===
- Moberly, Frederick James (1987). Operations in Persia, 1914–1919. London: HMSO. p. 490. ISBN 9780112904533. ("Official History")
- Sargent, Michael (April 2004). British Military Involvement in Transcaspia: 1918–1919 (PDF). Camberley: Conflict Studies Research Centre. p. 54. ISBN 1-904423-64-7.
- Wright, Damien (2017). Churchill's Secret War With Lenin: British and Commonwealth Military Intervention in the Russian Civil War, 1918–20. Solihull: Helion and Company. p. 576. ISBN 9781913118112.
