= Trans-Caspia =

Trans-Caspia is an old name for the region lying to the east of the Caspian Sea in Central Asia.

It can mean either Turkmenistan in particular, or the Central Asia region in general.

== History ==
It was used by the nineteenth century Russians because their main forces were in the Caucasus, and they approached the area by crossing the Caspian Sea. After the conquest of Turkmenistan they established a Transcaspian Oblast.

Following the Russian Revolution of 1917, the British Empire sent the Malleson Mission (1918-1919) to Trans-Caspia.

== See also ==
- Kirghiz−Kazakh Steppe
- Trans-Caspian Gas Pipeline
- Trans-Caspian Oil Pipeline
- Trans-Caspian railway
