= Tashkent Soviet =

1917 political organisation in Tashkent, Russian Turkestan

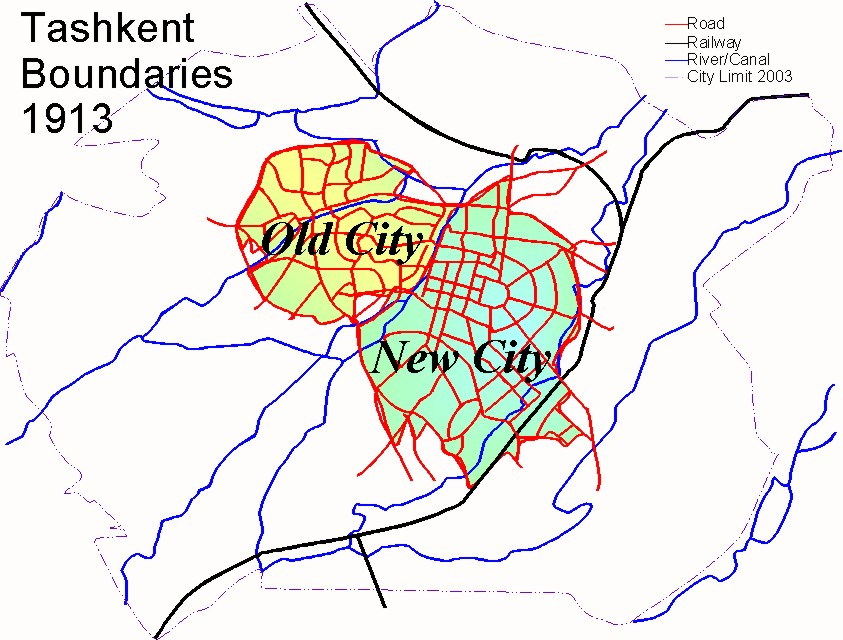
Map of Tashkent showing the boundaries of the city, main roads, railways and waterways

The Tashkent Soviet was a public organisation set up in Tashkent during the Russian Revolution. It was established on 2 March 1917 at an inaugural meeting that consisted of thirty five workers from the Central Asian Railway. It was headed by a technician named I. I. Bel'kov. The following day, there was a meeting in the local Duma which set up an Executive Committee of Public Organisations to manage the "sociopolitical and economic life of the city".

== Membership ==
Only two Central Asians were involved in this committee, the lawyers Fayzulla Khodzhayev and Tashpolad Narbutabekov. Despite this failure to actively involve the majority population, many Central Asians had high hopes for the post-tsarist era. The poet Sirajiddin Makhdum Sidqi published poems in popular verse to popularise the revolution. Veterans of the Jadid resistance to the draft in 1916 such as Kojaev and Munawar Qari organised the Tashkand Muslim Council (Tashkand Shura-yi Islamiya).

Tashkent was a divided city, with the Central Asians (predominantly Muslim) generally living in the Old City, while Russians and other Europeans usually lived in the New City, which was also where the railway was developed. The Soviet set up an independent provisions commission to battle what it described as "trader-marauders", however this term soon lost its ostensible class connotations, as the term was used to refer uniquely to Central Asians. At the same time, when some Central Asian workers set up a Muslim branch of the Social Democratic Party, the Tashkent Soviet did not welcome them.

== 1917 Revolution ==
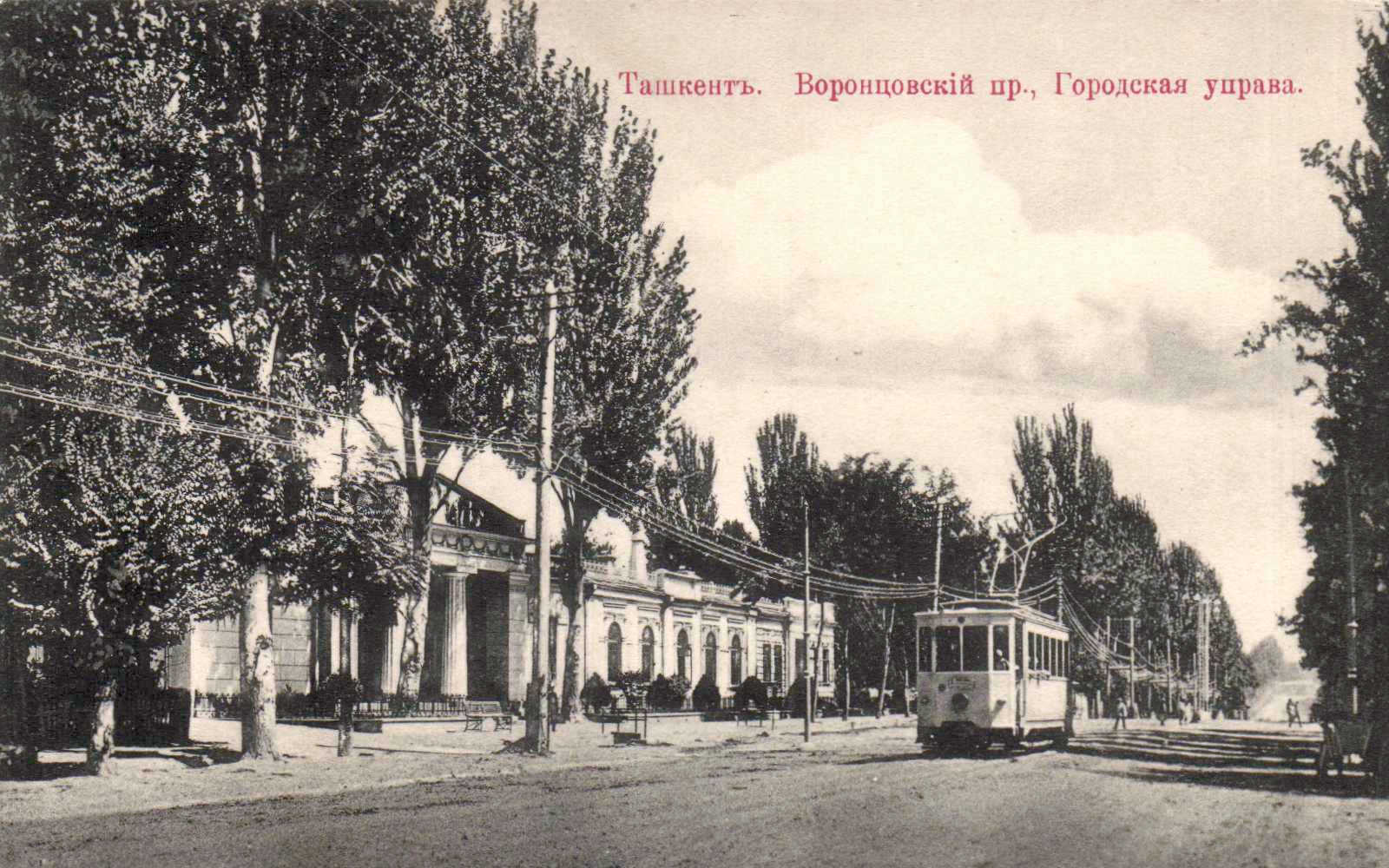
The building of the Tashkent Soviet, 1917

Prior to the revolution, the Bolsheviks did not have much influence in Tashkent. They had no official representation and organization; people in Tashkent and other smaller towns were never even aware of the word "Bolshevik" until late April or May. Thus, they had to cooperate with the Mensheviks. The Soviet organizations were first organized in the Tashkent and Turkestan regions after the officials of the Imperial regime were deposed after the formation of the Regional Soviet during April 7-15. The regional Soviet that was formed by the first Regional Congress of Workers' and Soldiers Deputies assumed nominal dominance in Turkestan, while the Executive Committee of the Tashkent Soviet that was dominated by the Mensheviks and Socialist Revolutionaries assumed pre-eminence in Tashkent. However, the Turkestan Committee that was appointed in Petrograd and consisted of several former members of the State Duma, the chairman, plus four Russian and four Muslim commissars, did not acknowledge the Soviets in the government even after the Provisional Government arrived in Tashkent to "restore order" in the region. The Turkestan Committee was trying to assert power over local authorities and troops to maintain order, however, every attempt was subsequently met with the Soviets questioning the legitimacy of the proceedings. The power and influence of Mensheviks were increasing, especially after the Provisional Government voted down the Bolshevik resolution demanding to end the war, in favour of the Mensheviks during the Second Regional Congress of the RSDLP that took place in Tashkent from 21 to 27 June 1917 (244). In this regard, no further political and social actions could be taken without the Tashkent and Regional Soviet's decision. After the "July Days" in Petrograd when pro-Bolshevik soldiers, sailors, and workers threatened to topple the government, many in Tashkent switched allegiance to the Bolsheviks, resulting in a decline of Menshevik's support, particularly when the Tashkent Social Democratic organization adopted a resolution for "All power to the Soviet" on July 21 (264). With the food shortages becoming critical in September and increasing distrust toward the Provisional Government, a crowd of thousands of people gathered together where a presidium, headed by the Bolshevik, was elected (256). After the fall of the Provisional Government, the power was finally passed to the Soviets.

The Tashkent Soviet fought the Transcaspian Government, who were assisted variously by the British Malleson Mission and the White Russians for control of the region between 1918 and 1919. The Tashkent Soviet succeeded after the British had withdrawn and Mikhail Frunze had arrived.

== See also ==
- Turkestan Autonomous Soviet Socialist Republic
