= Trans-Caspian railway =

Railway in Turkmenistan and Uzbekistan

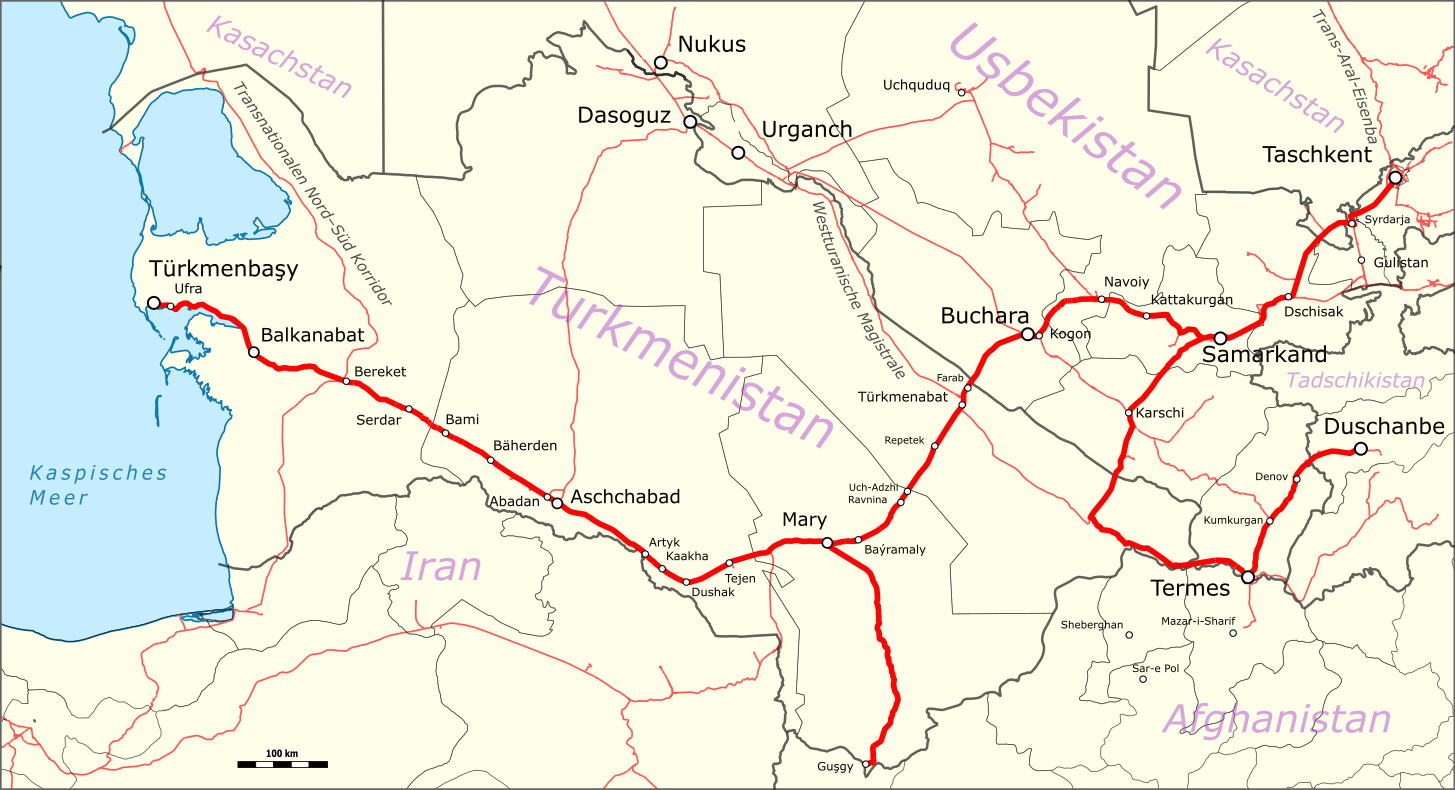
Map of the Trans-Caspian railway

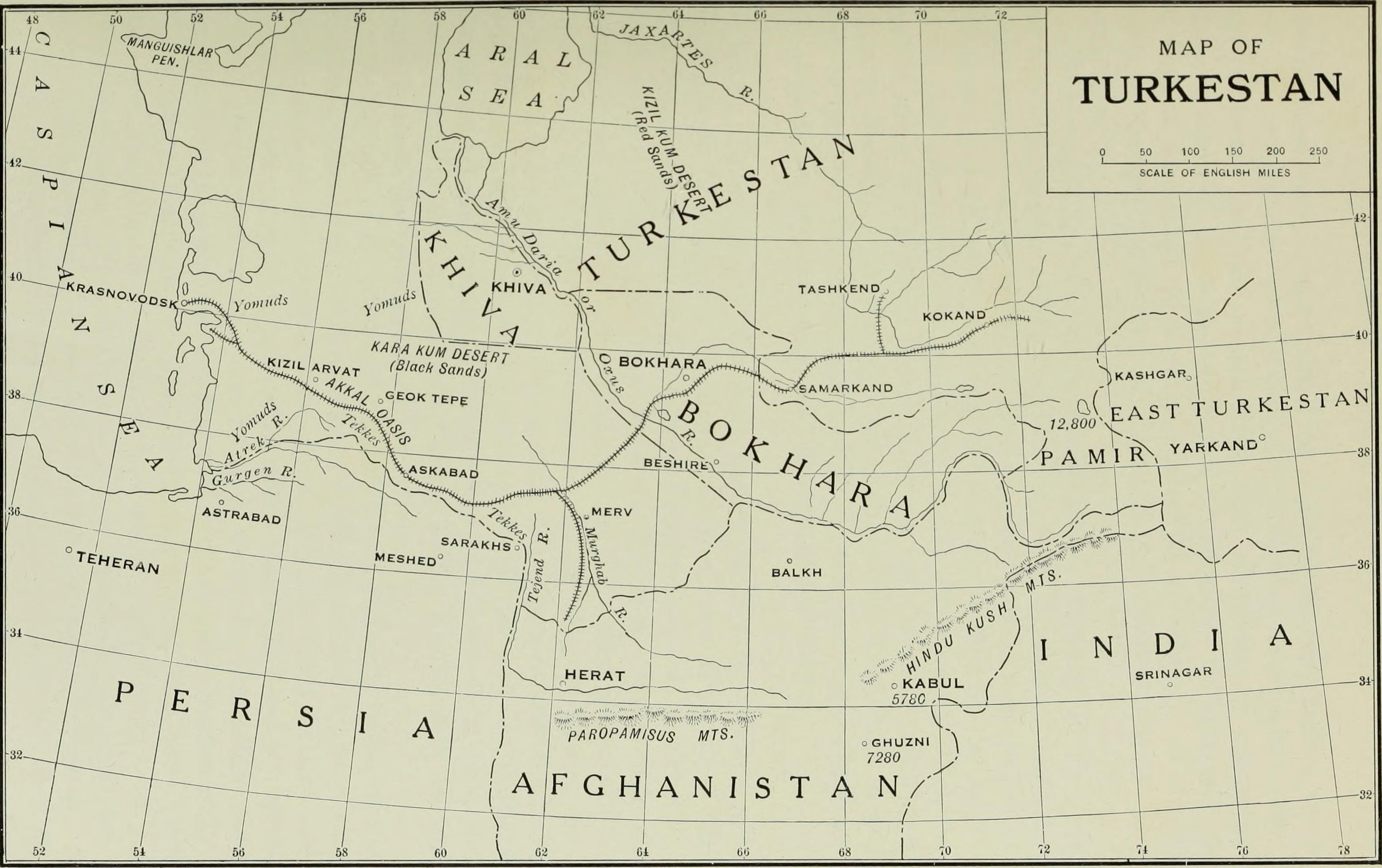
A map of the Central Asian Railway in 1922. The railway ran from Krasnovodsk to Kokand and Tashkend via Askabad, Bokhara and Samarkand.

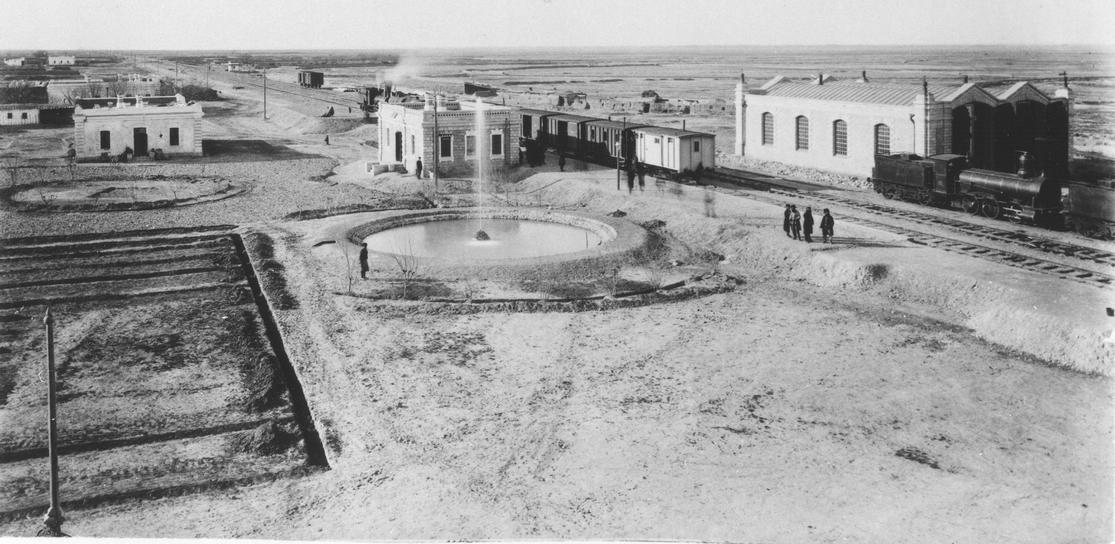
The station of Baharly on the Trans-Caspian Railway, c. 1890

The Trans-Caspian Railway (also called the Central Asian Railway, Russian: Среднеазиатская железная дорога) is a railway that follows the path of the Silk Road through much of western Central Asia. It was built by the Russian Empire during its expansion into Central Asia in the 19th century. The railway was started in 1879, following the Russian victory over Khokand. Originally it served a military purpose of facilitating the Imperial Russian Army in actions against the local resistance to their rule. However, when Lord Curzon visited the railway, he remarked that he considered its significance went beyond local military control and threatened British interests in Asia.

== History ==
=== Construction ===
Route of Trans-Caspian railway in Turkmenistan

Route of Trans-Caspian railway in Uzbekistan

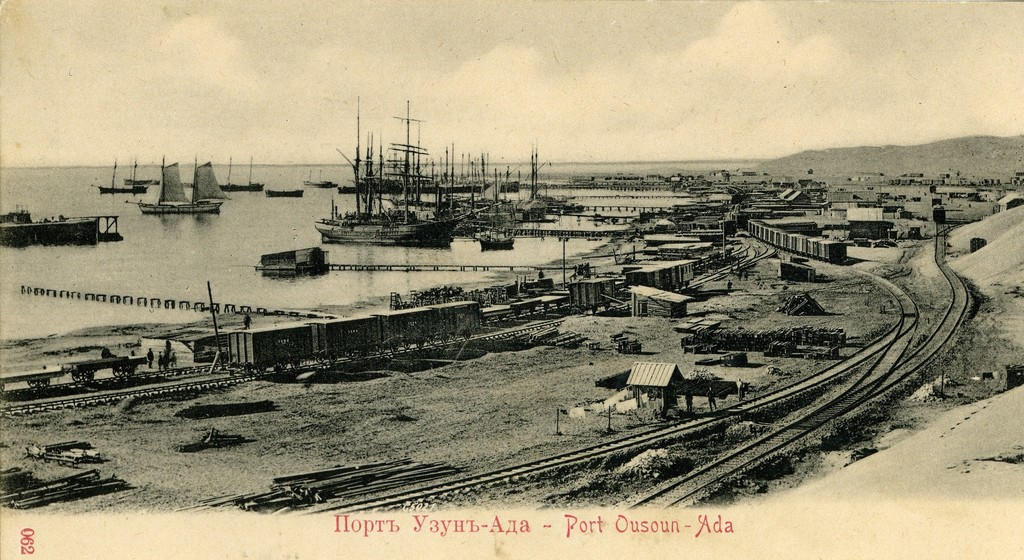
Uzun-Ada port and railway station

Construction began in 1879 of a narrow-gauge railway to Gyzylarbat in connection with the Russian conquest of Transcaspia under General Mikhail Skobelev. It was rapidly altered to the standard Russian gauge of 5 ft (1,524 mm), and construction through to Ashkabad and Merv (modern Mary) was completed under General Michael Nicolaivitch Annenkoff in 1886. Originally the line began from Uzun-Ada on the Caspian Sea, but the terminus was later shifted north to the harbour at Krasnovodsk. The Railway reached Samarkand via Bukhara in 1888, where it halted for ten years until extended to Tashkent and Andijan in 1898. The permanent bridge over the Oxus (Amu-Darya) was not completed until 1901, and until then trains ran over a rickety wooden construction that was often damaged by floods. As early as 1905, there was a train ferry across the Caspian Sea from Krasnovodsk to Baku in Azerbaijan. The Tashkent Railway connecting the Transcaspian Military Railway with the network of other Russian and European railways was completed in 1906.

=== Economic impact ===
The railway permitted a massive increase in the amount of cotton exported from the region. This increased from 873,092 pudy in 1888 to 3,588,025 in 1893. Also sugar, kerosene, wood, iron and construction material were imported into the area. These rising trade figures were used by Governor-General Nikolai Rozenbakh to argue for the extension to Tashkent, while the merchant N. I. Reshetnikov offered private funds for the same purpose.

=== Revolution and Civil War ===
The railway was the most important means of communication in the area, and workers on the railway became key activists during the Russian revolution. It was thirty-five railway workers who founded the Tashkent Soviet on 2 March 1917. They decreed that the administration of the railway should be transferred away from Ashkhabad and sent Commissar Frolov to that city, a move that proved unpopular. In turn, railway workers along the western end of the railway initiated a break away from Bolshevik-oriented Tashkent, setting up the Ashkhabad Executive Committee on 14 July 1918.

Both railway and workers played an important role in the Russian Civil War. Troops of the British Indian Army participated in some of the battles along the railway line. Tashkent was an important bastion for the Red Army.

=== Under the Soviet Union ===
During the Soviet period and beyond, the railway was administered from Tashkent.

== Route ==
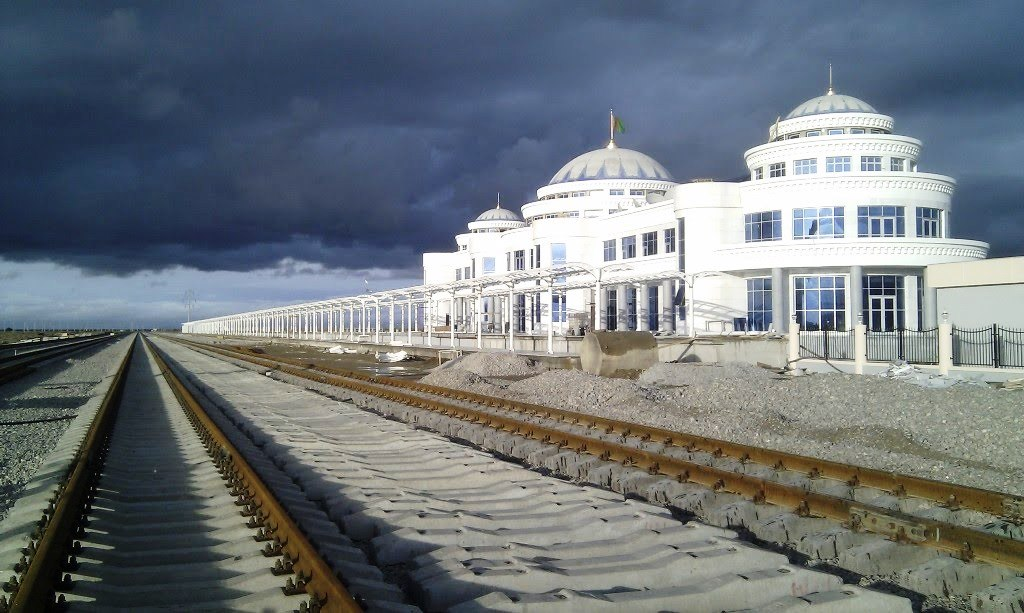
Bereket city in Turkmenistan is an important junction on the Trans-Caspian route.

The railway starts at the eastern shore of the Caspian Sea at Turkmenbashi (Krasnovodsk) and heads southeast, along the edge of the Karakum Desert. The important junction on the route and locomotive repair depot is located in Bereket city (formerly Gazandjyk) some 340 km (211 mi) to the east. Also at this point the Trans-Caspian railway intersects the newly constructed North-South Transnational Railway which connects Russia, Kazakhstan, Turkmenistan, Iran and ends at Persian Gulf. After Bereket, the route runs parallel to the Karakum Canal. It passes through Ashgabat (Ashkhabad) and continues southeast, hugging the foothills of the Kopet Dagh mountains, and passing through Tejen. At Tejen, a modern railway link branches off, heading to the Iranian border at Serakhs, and thence to Mashhad in Iran. From Tejen, the Trans-Caspian heads northeast, through Mary (Merv), where a branch line built in the 1890s leads to the Afghan border at Gushgy, and the main line carries on to Turkmenabat (Chärjew). From there, a branch built in the Soviet period connects northwestward to Urganch and on to Kazakhstan and Russia.

The main line continues from Turkmenabat through Bukhoro (where a branch line built in 1910 leads to Termez and Dushanbe) and then carries on to Samarqand. At Sirdaryo, where it crosses the Syr Darya river, a branch runs east into the fertile Fergana Valley. From there, the railway continues to Tashkent. There another northwest bound line runs to Kazakhstan, which branches at Arys forming the Turkestan-Siberia Railway to Novosibirsk.

== See also ==
- Railways in Turkmenistan
