= Transcaspian Government =

1918–1919 anti-Bolshevik government in Turkmenistan

Transcaspian Provisional Government Закаспийское временное правительство
- 1918–1920
- Flag

- Map showing the Transcaspian Government
- Capital: Ashgabat
- Government: Provisional government
- President
  - 1918–1919: Fyodor Funtikov
- History
  - Established: 12 July 1918
  - Disestablished: February 1920
Preceded by	Succeeded by
Russian SFSR	Turkestan Autonomous Soviet Socialist Republic
- Today part of: Turkmenistan

The Transcaspian Government (1918 - July 1919) was a "Menshevik-Socialist Revolutionary" coalition set up by the railway workers of the Trans-Caspian Railway in 1918. It was based at Ashgabat, Transcaspian Oblast.

== Origin ==
Autonomous sentiments were developing amongst the local Turkmen population, with the formation of the Turkmen National Army (TNA) in February 1918. Concerned about this, the Bolshevik Ashgabat Soviet appealed to Fyodor Kolesov, leader of the Tashkent Soviet for military support and declared it would carry out a census of all arms-bearing men in the Russian majority town on 17 June 1918. However, this sparked off two days of rioting.

The Tashkent Soviet dispatched some Red Guards led by V. Frolov and a Cheka contingent who arrived on 24 June and disarmed the Turkmen Cavalry Squadron, which was the core of the TNA. Frolov declared martial law and personally shot the five members of a delegation of railwaymen that had tried to present a petition to him. He proceeded to Kizyl-Arvat to continue restoring Bolshevik control but local railway workers had heard of the events and armed themselves. Frolov and a number of his bodyguards were shot and the remainder disarmed.

== Ashkhabad Committee ==
On 14 July 1918 The Ashkhabad Executive Committee was founded by Mensheviks and Social Revolutionaries following their successful revolt against the Bolsheviks of Tashkent. This committee took the name of the Trans Caspian Provisional Government in November 1918, but is generally referred to as the Transcaspian Government.

The initial leadership consisted of:

- Fyodor Funtikov, Socialist Revolutionary worker, President
- Vladimir Dhokov, railway worker
- D. Kurilov, railway worker
- L. A. Zimen, school teacher and orientalist, Minister of Foreign Affairs

== Military action ==
The Committee had around 1000 armed men, which consisted of Armenian and Russian troops. British opinion of these forces was less than complimentary. General Wilfrid Malleson had been dispatched by the British Government to resist the Bolshevik forces and assisted the Transcaspian forces by sending them a machine gun team across the border from India. This team stopped the Transcaspian forces being completely overrun by the Bolsheviks early in the conflict.

Malleson then sent an Anglo Indian unit to assist in what became referred to as the Malleson mission. The combined Anglo-Indian and Transcaspian force then went on to successfully engage the Bolsheviks, pushing them out of some of the major cities.

The Government was largely in a weak position. It had no economy and was existing on the money it had gained from the Soviets when it took over. The main economy was based on cotton, but it had no means to export it. It largely sought funds from the British which it did not get, even for food the British military had used and promised to pay for.

== The execution of the Baku Commissars ==
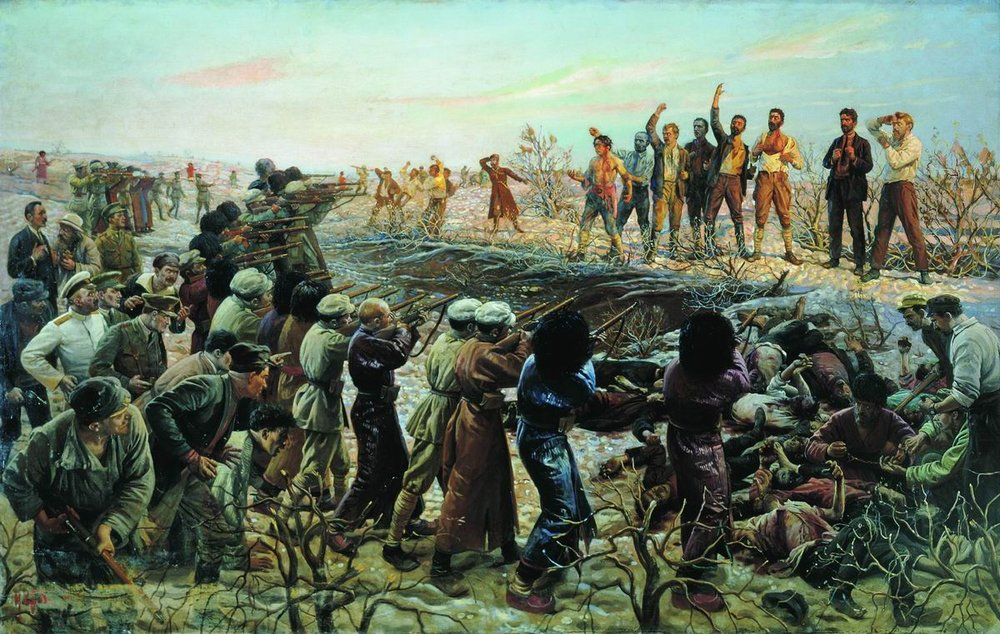
Isaak Brodsky's The Execution of the Twenty Six Baku Commissars, depicting the Soviet view of the execution.

On the night of 20 September 1918, under the leadership of Fyodor Funtikov, they executed the 26 Baku Commissars who had fled Baku by ship to Krasnovodsk in Turkmenistan.

== The crisis of December 1918 ==
In December 1918 there was a crisis in the Transcaspian Government. The Government felt it could not control the capital and asked help from the British, who helped by sending troops there. However the Government was fragile, Malleson's opinion being that they had at best a tenuous grip on their forces and people. In addition, Malleson had promised funds and had not delivered them. The people started protesting and the Committee resigned. It was replaced by another committee, which was appointed by Teague-Jones. The new committee eventually came under the influence of Denikin's Southern White Russian army and his men came to bolster the force, creating the White Turkestan Army in January 1919. However, when the British withdrew in the same year, the Bolsheviks went on the offensive and defeated the Transcaspian forces. By 1920 the Tashkent Soviet had regained control of the area and the Transcaspian Government was no more.

== See also ==
- Centrocaspian Dictatorship
