= Wilfrid Malleson =

British Army general (1866–1946)

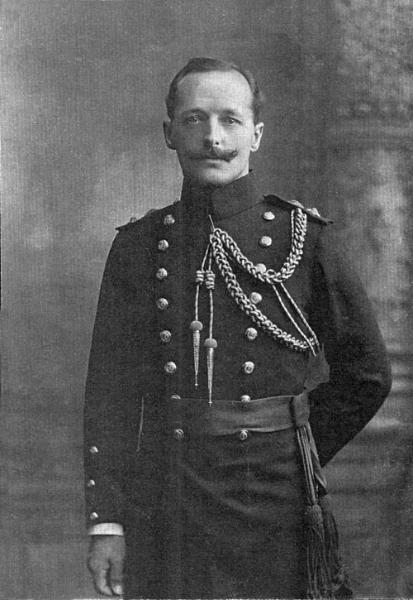
Wilfrid Malleson

Major-General Sir Wilfrid Malleson KCIE CB (8 September 1866 – 24 January 1946) was a major-general in the British Indian Army who led a mission to Turkestan during the Russian Civil War.

== Life ==
Malleson born in Baldersby, Yorkshire, and he was commissioned into the Royal Artillery in 1886. In 1904 he was transferred to the Indian Army and accompanied Sir Louis Dane on his mission to Kabul, Afghanistan, 1904–1905. He was posted to British East Africa, where he was appointed Inspector General of Communications. He participated in the Battle of Salaita and the Battle of Latema Nek.

He was appointed a Companion of the Order of the Bath in August 1916.

He then led the British Military Mission to Turkestan between 16 July 1918 – 5 April 1919, aiming to block possible German-Turkish thrusts towards India and Afghanistan. In August 1918, he dispatched a British Indian Army force consisting of a machine gun detachment comprising 40 Punjabi troops and a British officer to resist the Bolsheviks near Meru in what was the first direct confrontation between British and Russian troops since the Crimea War. He led the Malleson Mission an effort to curtail German and Turkish influence in the area, and to assist the Transcaspian Government against the Bolsheviks in the Russian Civil War. Malleson was forced to withdraw in April 1919 however.

Later he participated in the Third Anglo-Afghan War in 1919. He was involved in military intelligence, running a spy network from Meshed in north-eastern Iran against the Russians during this period. For his services, Malleson was knighted as a Knight Commander of the Order of the Indian Empire (KCIE) on 1 January 1920.

He retired from the Indian Army on 30 October 1920.

== Personal aspects ==
In 1894, he married Ida Kathleen King, daughter of Frederick St Aubyn King. Their son Wilfred St. Aubyn Malleson was awarded the Victoria Cross.

He died in Newton Abbot in 1946.

== See also ==
- Allied intervention in the Russian Civil War
