= Transcaspian Oblast =

Province of the Russian Empire and early Soviet Russia

Coordinates: 37.9500°N 58.3833°E

Transcaspian Oblast Закаспійская область
- Oblast
- Coat of arms

- Location in the Russian Empire
- Country: Russian Empire
- Governorate-General: Turkestan
- Established: 1881
- Abolished: 1921
- Capital: Askhabad

Area
  - Total: 605,150.93 km^{2} (233,650.08 sq mi)

Population (1897)
  - Total: 382,487
  - Density: 0.632052/km^{2} (1.63701/sq mi)

The Transcaspian Oblast, (Note: Russian: Закаспі́йская о́бласть, romanized: Zakaspíyskaya óblastʼ) or simply Transcaspia, (Note: Russian: Зака́спія, romanized: Zakáspiya) was an oblast of the Russian Empire and early Soviet Russia to the east of the Caspian Sea during the second half of the 19th century until 1924.

It was bounded to the south by Iran's Khorasan Province and Afghanistan, to the north by the former Ural Oblast of the Russian Empire, and to the northeast by the former Russian protectorates of Khiva and Bukhara. Part of Russian Turkestan, it corresponded roughly to the territory of present-day Turkmenistan and southwestern Kazakhstan.

The name of the oblast (literally, 'Beyond [the] Caspian') is explained by the fact that until the construction of the Trans-Aral Railway in the early 20th century the easiest way to reach this oblast from central Russia (or from Russian Transcaucasia) was across the Caspian Sea, by boat from Astrakhan or Baku.

Transcaspian Oblast in 1900 (in pink)

== History ==
Transcaspia was conquered by Russia in 1879–1885, in a series of campaigns led by Generals Nikolai Lomakin, Mikhail Skobelev, and Mikhail Annenkov. The construction of the Transcaspian Railway was started from the shores of the Caspian in 1879 in order to secure Russian control over the region and provide a rapid military route to the Afghan border. In 1885 a crisis was precipitated by the Russian annexation of the Panjdeh oasis, to the south of Merv, which nearly led to war with Britain, as it was thought that the Russians were planning to march on to Herat in Afghanistan. Until 1898 Transcaspia was part of the Governor-Generalship of the Caucasus Viceroyalty administered from Tiflis, but in that year it was made an oblast of Russian Turkestan governed from Tashkent. The best known military governor to have ruled the region from Ashkhabad was probably General Kuropatkin, whose authoritarian methods and personal style of governance made the province very difficult for his successors to control. Consequently, the administration of Transcaspia became a byword for corruption and brutality within Russian Turkestan, as Russian administrators turned their districts into petty fiefdoms and extorted money from the local population. These abuses were fully exposed by the Pahlen Report of 1908–1910.

In July 1918, anti-Bolshevik railway workers established a provisional Transcaspian government at Ashkhabad, dominated by members of the Socialist Revolutionary Party with Menshevik participation. British forces of the Malleson Mission entered Transcaspia from Persia the following month and supported the government in fighting along the Trans-Caspian railway until the last British troops withdrew on 14 April 1919. Bolshevik forces captured Merv in May 1919, and the remaining anti-Bolshevik government and military forces evacuated Ashkhabad on 15 July and retreated westwards, first towards Kizyl-Arvat and then Krasnovodsk. The capture of Krasnovodsk by Bolshevik forces in February 1920 completed the reconquest of Transcaspia.

== Demographics ==
As of 1897, 382,487 people populated the oblast. Turkmens constituted the majority of the population, and significant minorities were Kazakhs and Russians. The total Turkic-speaking population was 328,059 (85.8%).

=== Ethnicity ===
==== Overall ====
According to the 1897 Russian census, the ethnic groups by population were:

Ethnic group	Population	Percentage
Turkmens	248,651	65%
Kazakhs	74,225	19.4%
Russians	27,942	7.3%
Persians	8,015	2.1%
Total	382,487	100%

==== By okrug ====
Ethnic groups by percentage of the Transcaspian population according to the 1897 census:

Okrug (district)	Turkmens	Kazakhs	Russians	Persians
Ashgabat	73.1%	-	12.8%	3.3%
Krasnovodsk	62.4%	19.3%	9.7%	3.4%
Mangyshlak (centred on Fort-Aleksandrovsk)	4%	93%	2.6%	-
Merv	88%	-	4.5%	0.8%
Tejen	82%	-	7.9%	4.1%
Total	65%	19.4%	7.3%	2.1%

Ethnic groups by population in Transcaspia according to the 1897 census:

Okrug	Turkmens	Kazakhs	Russians	Persians
Ashgabat	67,443	22	11,763	3,206
Krasnovodsk	33,529	10,394	5,222	1,822
Mangyshlak	2,767	63,795	1,795	6
Merv	104,980	11	5,321	964
Tedjen	39,932	3	3,841	2,017
Total	248,651	74,225	27,942	8,015
