= List of fleet and grand admirals =

The following list of fleet and grand admirals is a summary of those individuals who have held the rank of fleet admiral, or its equivalent, as the senior officers of their countries' navies.

== Austria-Hungary ==
- 1911 – Archduke Charles Stephen of Austria (1860–1933)
- 5 May 1916 – Anton Haus (1851–1917)
- 9 October 1916 – Prinz Heinrich of Prussia (1862–1929)
- 1 November 1916 – Charles I of Austria (1887–1922)
- 22 February 1917 – Emperor William II of Germany (1859–1941)

== China ==
- Zheng He (1371–1433)
- Shi Lang (1621–1696)
- Sa Zhenbing (1859-1952)
- Chen Shaokuan (1889-1969)
- Xiao Jingguang (1903–1989)

== Croatia ==
- March 1996 – Sveto Letica (1926–2001)

== Egypt ==
- King Fuad I (1868–1936)
- King Farouk (1920–1965)
- 26 July 1952 – King Fuad II (born 1952)

== France ==
- 1340 – Hugues Quiéret (1290–1340)
- 1341 – Luis de la Cerda (1291–1348)
- 1373 – Jean de Vienne (1341–1396)
- 1421 – Louis de Culant (1360–1444)
- 1437 – André de Laval-Montmorency (1408–1485)
- 1450 – Jean V de Bueil (1406–1477)
- 1521 – Guillaume Gouffier de Bonnivet (1488–1525)
- 1525 – Philippe de Chabot (1492–1543)
- 1552 – Gaspard de Coligny (1519–1572)
- 1582 – Anne de Joyeuse (1560–1587)
- 1587 – Jean Louis de Nogaret de La Valette (1554–1642)
- 1592 – Charles de Gontaut, duc de Biron (1562–1602)
- 1612 – Henri II de Montmorency (1595–1632)
- 1651 – César de Bourbon, duc de Vendôme (1594–1665)
- 1683 – Louis-Alexandre de Bourbon, Comte de Toulouse (1678–1737)
- 1737 – Louis Jean Marie de Bourbon, duc de Penthièvre (1725–1793)
- 2 February 1805 – Joachim Murat (1767–1815)
- 1814 – Louis-Antoine, Duke of Angoulême (1775–1844)
- 1831 – Laurent Truguet (1752–1839)
- 1840 – Albin Roussin (1781–1854)
- 1854 – Charles Baudin (1792–1854)
- 1854 – Ferdinand Alphonse Hamelin (1796–1864)
- 1854 – Alexandre Ferdinand Parseval-Deschenes (1790–1860)
- 1855 – Armand Joseph Bruat (1796–1855)
- 1860 – Prince Napoléon (1822–1891)
- 1860 – Joseph Romain-Desfossés (1798–1864)
- 27 January 1864 – Charles Rigault de Genouilly (1807–1873)
- 15 November 1864 – Léonard Charner (1797–1869)
- 20 February 1869 – François Thomas Tréhouart (1798–1873)
- 1939 – François Darlan (1881–1942)

== Germany ==
- 1871 – Prince Adalbert (1811–1873)
- 1901 – Emperor Wilhelm II (1859–1941)
- 1901 – King Oscar II of Sweden (1829–1907)
- 26 June 1902 – King Edward VII of Great Britain (1841-1910)
- 28 June 1905 – Hans von Koester (1844–1928)
- 4 September 1909 – Prinz Heinrich of Prussia (1862–1929)
- 27 January 1911 – Alfred von Tirpitz (1849–1930)
- 31 May 1918 – Henning von Holtzendorff (1853–1919)
- 1 April 1939 – Erich Raeder (1876–1960)
- 30 January 1943 – Karl Dönitz (1891–1980)

== Greece ==
- WWII – King George II of Greece (1890–1947)

== Iraq ==
- King Faisal I (1883–1933)

== Italy ==
- 4 November 1924 – Conte Paolo Thaon di Revel (1859–1948)

== Japan ==
- 20 January 1898 – Marquis Tsugumichi Saigo (1843–1902)
- 31 January 1906 – Sukeyuki Ito (1843–1914)
- 31 October 1911 – Viscount Yoshika Inoue (1845–1929)
- 21 April 1913 – Marquis Heihachiro Togo (1847–1934)
- 7 July 1913 – Prince Takahito Arisugawa (1862–1913)
- 26 May 1917 – Goro Ijuin (1852–1921)
- 27 June 1922 – Prince Yorihito Higashi (1867–1922)
- 8 January 1923 – Baron Hayao Shimamura (1858–1923)
- 24 August 1923 – Baron Tomozaburo Kato (1861–1923)
- 27 May 1932 – Prince Hiroyasu Fushimi (1876–1946)
- 18 April 1943 – Isoroku Yamamoto (1884–1943)
- 21 June 1943 – Osami Nagano (1880–1947)
- 31 May 1944 – Mineichi Koga (1885–1944)

== Korea ==
- Yi Sunsin (1545–1598)

== Ottoman Empire ==
- List of Ottoman Kapudan Pashas

== Peru ==
- 1967 – Miguel Grau Seminario (1834–1879) (posthumous)

== Prussia ==
- 1854 – Prince Adalbert (1811–1873)

== Russian Empire ==
- 1708 – General-Admiral Count Fyodor Apraksin (1661–1728)
- 1727 – Admiral Generalissimus Prince Alexander Menshikov (1673–1729)
- 1740 – General-Admiral Count Andrei Osterman (1686–1747)
- 1756 – General-Admiral Prince Mikhail Golitsyn (1681–1764)
- 1762 – General-Admiral Tsar Paul I (1754–1801)
- 1784 – General-Field marshal Prince Grigori Potemkin (1739–1791)
- 1796 – Navy General-Field marshal Count Ivan Chernyshyov (1726–1797)
- 1831 – General-Admiral Grand Duke Konstantin Nikolayevich of Russia (1827–1892)
- 1883 – General-Admiral Grand Duke Alexei Alexandrovich (1850–1908)

== Russian Federation ==
=== Admirals of the fleet ===
- 1996 – Feliks Gromov (1937–2021)
- 2000 – Vladimir Kuroyedov (1944–2026)
- 2005 – Vladimir Masorin (born 1947)
- 2025 – Aleksandr Moiseyev (born 1962)

== Soviet Union ==
=== Admirals of the fleet ===
- 31 May 1944 – Nikolai Kuznetsov (1902–1974) (Note: (later admiral of the fleet of the Soviet Union)) (demoted to rear admiral 3 February 1948, promoted to vice admiral 27 January 1951, reinstated 11 May 1953)
- 31 May 1944 – Ivan Isakov (1894–1967)
- 18 June 1962 – Vladimir Kasatonov (1910–1989)
- 28 April 1967 – Sergey Gorshkov (1910–1988)
- 30 April 1970 – Nikolai Sergeyev (1909–1999)
- 28 July 1970 – Semyon Lobov (1913–1977)
- 1973 – Georgiy Yegorov (1918–2008)
- 5 November 1973 – Nikolai Smirnov (1917–1992)
- 16 February 1982 – Alexei Sorokin (1922–2020)
- 5 November 1983 – Vladimir Chernavin (1928-2023)
- 4 November 1988 – Ivan Kapitanets (1928–2018)
- 4 November 1989 – Konstantin Makarov (1931–2011)

=== Admirals of the Fleet of the Soviet Union ===
- 03 March 1955 – Nikolai Kuznetsov (1902–1974) (demoted to vice admiral 17 February 1956, reinstated posthumously 26 July 1988)
- 03 March 1955 – Ivan Isakov (1894–1967)
- 28 October 1967 – Sergey Gorshkov (1910–1988)

== Sri Lanka ==
- Wasantha Karannagoda (born 1952) (Honorary rank)

== Sweden ==
- King Charles XIII (1748–1818)
- King Oscar I (1799–1859)
- King Oscar II (1829–1907)

== Thailand ==
- 1910 – Prince Bhanurangsi Savangwongse (1859–1928) (Honorary rank)
- 1917 – Prince Paribatra Sukhumbandhu (1881–1944)
- 1941 – Plaek Phibunsongkhram (1897–1964) (Honorary rank)
- 1956 – Prayoon Yuthasastrkosol (1905–1957)
- 1959 – Sarit Thanarat (1908–1963) (Honorary rank)
- 1964 – Thanom Kittikachorn (1911–2004) (Honorary rank)
- 1973 – Praphas Charusathien (1912–1997) (Honorary rank)
- 1992 – Queen Sirikit (1932–2025) (Honorary rank)
- 1998 – Prince Mahidol Adulyadej (1892–1929) (Honorary rank awarded posthumously, previously served in the Royal Thai Navy as a captain)

== United Kingdom ==
- List of British admirals of the fleet

== United States ==
- 24 March 1903 (retroactive to 2 March, 1899) – George Dewey (1837–1917)
- 15 December 1944 – William D. Leahy (1875–1959)
- 17 December 1944 – Ernest King (1878–1956)
- 19 December 1944 – Chester W. Nimitz (1885–1966)
- 11 December 1945 – William Halsey Jr. (1882–1959)

== Yugoslavia ==
- 1983 – Branko Mamula (1921–2021)
