= List of inspectors general of the Ministry of Defence of the Russian Federation =

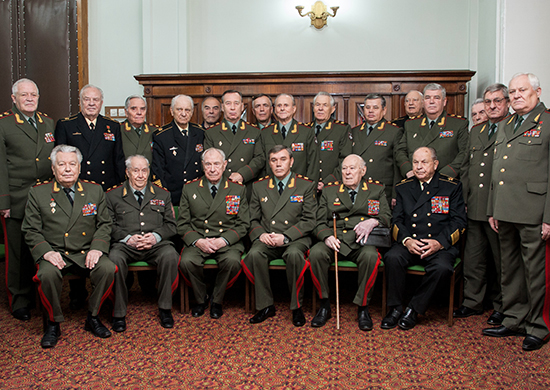
Members of the Office of Inspectors General in 2013, with Chief of the General Staff Valery Gerasimov

The Office of Inspectors General of the Ministry of Defence of the Russian Federation (Russian: Управление генеральных инспекторов Министерства обороны Российской Федерации is a constituent part of the Russian Ministry of Defence.

Created in 2008, it numbers around thirty retired senior members of the Russian Armed Forces, usually those with the ranks of marshals of the Soviet Union, generals of the army, admirals of the fleet, marshals of artillery, marshals of aviation, and colonel generals. The membership changes as members die, and new members are appointed. Though members remain retired from the military during their service, they receive a salary.

The original members were presented with their credentials by Deputy Defence Minister Nikolay Pankov at an official ceremony at the Central House of Officers of the Russian Army on 30 December 2008. Among this original group were Marshal of the Soviet Union Dmitry Yazov, army generals Anatoly Betekhtin, Filipp Bobkov, Makhmut Gareev, Nikolai Grachyov, Ivan Yefremov, Viktor Yermakov, Konstantin Kochetov, Vladimir Lobov, Mikhail Moiseyev, Stanislav Postnikov, Viktor Prudnikov, Viktor Samsonov, Vladimir Shuralyov, Yuri Yashin and Yury Yakubov, Admirals of the Fleet Ivan Kapitanets, Konstantin Makarov, Vladimir Chernavin and Alexey Sorokin, Marshal of the Artillery Vladimir Mikhailin, Marshal of Aviation Ivan Pstygo and Colonel General Ivan Fuzhenko.

== Current members ==
Name	Image	Born	Rank	Career posts	Appointment
Yuri Baluyevsky		1947	Army General	Chief of the General Staff, First Deputy Minister of Defence (2004–2008)	
Valery Baranov		1948	Colonel General	Commander of the Joint Group of Forces for Counter-Terrorist Operations in the North Caucasus Region (2000-2001 and 2003–2004)	
Viktor Barynkin		1946	Colonel General	Head of the Main Operations Directorate of the General Staff of the Armed Forces of the Russian Federation (1992–1996)	
Aleksandr Bezverkhny		1950	Colonel General	Head of FSB military counterintelligence (2000–2015)	
Vladimir Boldyrev		1949	Army General	Commander-in-Chief of the Russian Ground Forces (2008–2010)	
Dmitry Bulgakov		1954	Army General	Head of the Logistical Support of the Russian Armed Forces (2008–2011) - Deputy Minister of Defence (2008–2022)	2022
Anatoly Grebenyuk		1955	Army General	Head of the Military Construction Complex of the Ministry of Defence (2004–2007)	
Vladimir Isakov		1950	Army General	Head of Rear of the Russian Armed Forces - Deputy Minister of Defence (1997–2008)	
Konstantin Kochetov		1932	Army General	First Deputy Minister of Defence (1989–1991)	2008
Georgy Kogatko		1944	Colonel General	Commander of the Russian Railway Troops (2004–2008)	
Vladimir Lobov		1935	Army General	Chief of the General Staff of the Soviet Armed Forces — First Deputy Minister of Defence (1991)	2008
Nikolay Makarov		1949	Army General	Chief of the General Staff of the Russian Armed Forces — First Deputy Minister of Defence (2008–2012)	
Ivan Marchuk		1944	Colonel General	Head of the Ministry of Defence Federal Road Construction Directorate (1992–1998)	
Yuri Rodionov		1938	Colonel General	Deputy Minister of Defence for Personnel - Head of the Main Directorate of Personnel of the Ministry of Defence (1991–1992)	
Vladimir Semyonov		1940	Army General	Commander-in-Chief of the Soviet Army (1991–1992), Commander-in-Chief of the Russian Army (1992–1997)	
Vladimir Yakovlev		1954	Army General	Commander-in-chief of the Strategic Rocket Forces (1997–2001)	
Yury Yakubov		1946	Army General	Commander of the Far Eastern Military District (1999–2006)	2008
Ivan Yefremov		1946	Army General	Head of the Military Academy of the General Staff of the Armed Forces of Russia (2005–2007)	2008
Viktor Yermakov		1935	Army General	Head of the Main Directorate of the Ministry of Defence of the USSR - Deputy Minister of Defence of the USSR for Personnel (1990–1991)	2008

== Former members ==
Name	Image	Lifespan	Rank	Career posts	Appointment
Anatoly Betekhtin		1931—2012	Army General	First Deputy Commander of the Army (1988–1992)	2008
Filipp Bobkov		1925—2019	Army General	First Deputy Chairman of the KGB (1985–1991)	2008
Vladimir Chernavin		1928—2023	Admiral of the Fleet	Commander-in-Chief of the Navy — Deputy Minister of Defence (1985–1992)	2008
Pyotr Deynekin		1937—2017	Army General	Commander-in-Chief of the Russian Air Force (1992–1998)	
Ivan Fuzhenko		1937—2011	Colonel General	Commander of the Logistics Forces — Deputy Defence Minister (1991–1992)	2008
Makhmut Gareev		1923—2019	Army General	Deputy Head of the General Staff (1984–1989)	2008
Nikolai Grachyov		1930—2013	Army General	Chief military specialist to the Afghan Armed Forces (1990–1992)	2008
Feliks Gromov		1937—2021	Admiral of the Fleet	Commander-in-Chief of the Russian Navy (1992–1996)	
Ivan Kapitanets		1928—2018	Admiral of the Fleet	First Deputy Commander-in-Chief of the Russian Navy (1988–1992)	2008
Georgy Kondratyev		1944—2020	Colonel General	Deputy Defence Minister (1992–1995)	
Oleg Losik		1915—2012	Marshal of the Armoured Forces	Head of the Military Armoured Forces Academy (1969–1986)	
Konstantin Makarov		1931—2011	Admiral of the Fleet	Chief of the Naval General Staff — First Deputy Commander-in-Chief of the Navy (1985–1992)	2008
Vladimir Mikhailin		1927—2017	Marshal of the Artillery	Commander of the Rocket Forces and Artillery of the Army (1983–1991)	2008
Mikhail Moiseyev		1939—2022	Army General	Chief of the General Staff of the Soviet Armed Forces - First Deputy Defence Minister (1988–1991), Acting Defence Minister (22-23 August 1991)	2008
Stanislav Postnikov		1928—2012	Army General	Commander-in-Chief of the Western Forces Direction (1988–1992)	2008
Viktor Prudnikov		1939—2015	Army General	Commander-in-Chief of the Air Defence Forces (1992–1997)	2008
Ivan Pstygo		1918—2009	Marshal of Aviation	Head of the Central Flight Safety Inspectorate of the Armed Forces (1977–1983)	2008
Igor Puzanov		1947—2023	Army General	Commander of Leningrad Military District (2005–2007)	
Viktor Samsonov		1941—2024	Army General	Chief of the General Staff of the Russian Armed Forces - First Deputy Defence Minister (1996–1997)	2008
Sergey Sokolov		1911—2012	Marshal of the Soviet Union	Defence Minister (1984–1987)	2008
Alexey Sorokin		1922—2020	Admiral of the Fleet	First Deputy Head of the Political Directorate of the Soviet Army and Soviet Navy (1981–1989)	2008
Vladimir Shuralyov		1935—2020	Army General	Deputy Defence Minister (1990–1991)	2008
Dmitry Yazov		1924—2020	Marshal of the Soviet Union	Defence Minister (1987–1991)	2008
Yuri Yashin		1930—2011	Army General	Deputy Defence Minister (1989–1992)	2008
Yuri Zarudin		1923—2020	Colonel General	Commander of the Northern Group of Forces (1978–1984)	
