= Admiral of the Fleet of the Soviet Union =

Highest naval rank of the Soviet Union

Admiral of the fleet of the Soviet Union Адмирал Флота Советского Союза
- Marshal's star – big

- Uniform shoulder strap (1955–1990)
- Country: USSR
- Service branch: Soviet Navy
- Rank: General officer
- Formation: March 1955
- Abolished: 1991
- Next higher rank: Generalissimo of the Soviet Union
- Next lower rank: Admiral of the fleet
- Equivalent ranks: Marshal of the Soviet Union

An Admiral of the Fleet of the Soviet Union (Russian: Адмирал Флота Советского Союза, romanized: Admiral Flota Sovietskogo Soyuza) was the highest naval rank of the Soviet Union.

== Overview ==
The rank was largely honorary and could be considered equivalent to admiral of the fleet in other nations. It was formally established by the Council of Ministers of the Soviet Union on March 3, 1955, and replaced a similarly named rank, Fleet Admiral/Admiral of the Fleet (адмирал флота) that had been equivalent to Army General since 1945. The holders were entitled to a marshal's star.

Upon its creation, the only two admirals of the fleet, Nikolai Kuznetsov and Ivan Isakov, were "promoted" to this rank. Less than a year later Kuznetsov was demoted to vice admiral for political reasons in 1956 and Isakov remained the only admiral of the fleet of the Soviet Union until his death in 1967. Then, in October 1967, Fleet Admiral Sergei Gorshkov became the third and final admiral of the fleet of the Soviet Union. Gorshkov died in 1988 and no further appointments were made before the fall of the Soviet Union in 1991 and the elimination of the rank.

From 1962 onwards, it was one grade higher than Fleet Admiral, which was recreated as an intermediate rank, equivalent to Army General.

== List of admirals of the fleet of the Soviet Union ==
Portrait	Name (Birth–Death)	Promoted	Retired	Ref.
	Ivan Isakov (1894–1967)	3 March 1955		
	Nikolai Kuznetsov (1904–1974)	3 March 1955	February 1956 (Note: Demoted 17 February 1956, rank restored posthumously 26 July 1988.)	
	Sergey Gorshkov (1910–1988)	28 October 1967	December 1985	

== See also ==
- Ranks and rank insignia of the Soviet Army 1943–1955, and ... 1955–1991
- Marshal of the Soviet Union
- Soviet military ranks
