= Army ranks and insignia of the Russian Federation =

The ranks and insignia used by Russian Ground Forces are inherited from the military ranks of the Soviet Union, although the insignia and uniform have been altered slightly.

Civil service insignia may be confused with military insignia. Civil servants within the Russian Ministry of Defense may carry green or black service uniforms. See State civilian and municipal service ranks of the Russian Federation for a list of civil ranks.

== Ranks and insignia ==
The following is a table of ranks of the armed forces of the Russian Federation. An English translation is given first, followed by the Russian original, then by a transromanisation of the Russian.

=== Officers ===
Category	Troop ranks	Dress uniform	Everyday uniform	Field uniform
Supreme and general officers	Marshal of the Russian Federation (Note: The rank of marshal of the Russian Federation, the highest in the Russian Army, is not presently held by anyone in the modern armed forces of the Russian Federation. The only officer to hold the rank is the former Minister of Defense Igor Sergeyev, who was elevated from the commander (army general) of the Strategic Rocket Forces. As it stands, marshal of the Russian Federation should be considered an honorary title equivalent to a field marshal, marshal or five-star general in other countries, created in the event of a major war or as the result of extreme military accomplishment (see marshal of the Soviet Union).); Ма́ршал Росси́йской Федера́ции; Márshal Rossíyskoy Federátsii			
Supreme and general officers	Army general Генера́л а́рмии Generál ármii			
Supreme and general officers	Colonel general Генера́л-полко́вник; Generál-polkóvnik			
Supreme and general officers	Lieutenant general Генера́л-лейтена́нт; Generál-leytenánt			
Supreme and general officers	Major general Генера́л-майо́р; Generál-mayór			
Senior officers or field grade officers	Colonel; Полко́вник; Polkóvnik			
Senior officers or field grade officers	Lieutenant colonel Подполко́вник; Podpolkóvnik			
Senior officers or field grade officers	Major; Майо́р; Mayór			
Junior officers or company grade officers	Captain; Kапита́н; Kapitán			
Junior officers or company grade officers	Senior lieutenant Ста́рший лейтена́нт Stárshiy leytenánt			
Junior officers or company grade officers	Lieutenant; Лейтена́нт; Leytenánt			
Junior officers or company grade officers	Junior lieutenant Mла́дший лейтена́нт Mládshiy leytenánt			
Student officers	Officer cadet Курса́нт; Kursánt			

=== Other ranks ===
Category	Troop ranks	Dress uniform	Everyday uniform	Field uniform
Warrant officers	Senior warrant officer Ста́рший пра́порщик Stárshiy práporshchik			
Warrant officers	Warrant officer Пра́порщик; Práporshchik			
Sergeants	Sergeant major Старшина́ Starshiná			
Sergeants	Senior sergeant Ста́рший сержа́нт Stárshiy serzhánt			
Sergeants	Sergeant; Сержа́нт; Serzhánt			
Sergeants	Junior sergeant Мла́дший сержа́нт Mládshiy serzhánt			
Enlisted	Corporal; Ефре́йтор; Yefréytor			
Enlisted	Private; Рядово́й; Ryadovóy			

Rank titles are sometimes modified due to a particular assignment, branch, or status:

- The ranks of servicemen assigned to a "guards" unit or formation are preceded by the word "guards";
- The ranks of servicemen in the legal, medical, and veterinary branches are followed by "of justice", "of the medical service", and "of the veterinary service", respectively;
- The ranks of servicemen in the reserve or retired are followed by "of the reserve" or "in retirement", respectively.

== Reforms ==
=== Insignia reform (2010) ===
On 11 March 2010, Law No.2010-293 of the President of Russia introduced a new set of rank insignia. Privates, airmen, and seamen now wear plain shoulder epaulets. Senior NCOs had their chevrons replaced by plain bars (small horizontal bars for corporals and sergeants increasing in number with seniority, large horizontal bars for staff sergeants, and vertical bars for master sergeants). These rank badges mirror the insignia of both the Imperial Russian Army and the Soviet Army in the 1970s. Warrant officers and officers received new shoulder rank epaulettes and all general officer insignia now reflect service affiliation in the duty dress uniform. The parade dress gold epaulets have been retained. The insignia for a marshal of the Russian Federation retained the coat of arms of Russia and the marshal's star.

=== Rank and insignia reform (2013) ===
In 2013, the insignia of an army general now included the marshal's star, surmounted by a red star in a wreath. In Spring 2013, the warrant officer ranks, which had been removed as a result of the 2008 Russian military reform, were reinstated.

== See also ==
- History of Russian military ranks
- List of Russian generals killed during the 2022 invasion of Ukraine
- Ranks and insignia of the Russian Federation's armed forces 1994–2010
- Registered Cossack ranks
