= Federal Military Memorial Cemetery =

Federal cemetery in Moscow, Russia

Coordinates: 55°55′38″N 37°40′31″E

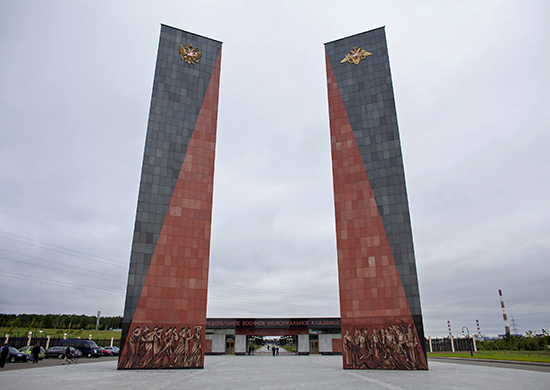
- Interactive map of Federal Military Memorial Cemetery

Details
- Established: 21 June 2013
- Location: Mytishchinsky District, Moscow Oblast
- Country: Russia
- Owned by: Ministry of Defence
- Size: 55 hectares (140 acres)

The Federal Military Memorial Cemetery (Russian: Федеральное военное мемориальное кладбище) is a national cemetery of Russia, located in Mytishchinsky District, Moscow Oblast, on the north-eastern outskirts of Moscow.

The cemetery was built as the new burial place for national dignitaries to replace the Kremlin Wall Necropolis, where burials ceased after 1985, and was opened with its inaugural burial on 21 June 2013.

== History ==
The first decision to establish a national cemetery was adopted in 1953, as a resolution of the USSR Council of Ministers, but the project was never implemented. The burial of national dignitaries irregularly took place at the Kremlin Wall Necropolis in Red Square, Moscow, ending with the funeral of Soviet General Secretary Konstantin Chernenko in March 1985. After the fall of the Soviet Union in 1991, there were plans to relocate the Kremlin Wall Necropolis, since it ruins the old style of the Moscow Kremlin. The concept of a national cemetery was resurrected in the early 1990s by a state-owned body called Mosproject-4, and the designer Alexander Taranin said he wanted to "create a minimalistic cemetery that gave a quiet and honest reflection of Russia". The cemetery was established in accordance with the Presidential Decree of 11 July 2001, number 829 "On the Federal Military Memorial Cemetery" to "perpetuate the memory of soldiers and other Russian citizens who died in the defense of the Motherland, and who had special merits to the state".

Construction of the Federal Military Memorial Cemetery began on 15 March 2008, on a 55 hectare plot off the Ostashkovskoe highway, located near the villages of Sgonniki and Borisovka in Mytishchinsky District, Moscow Oblast, west of the city of Mytishchi. The cemetery is planned to be the main national cemetery of Russia for the next 200 years, and is predicted to house 40,000 graves. On 21 June 2013, the inaugural burial took place when the remains of an unknown Red Army soldier who died in Smolensk Oblast during World War II, and the complex was officially opened to the public the following day. On 30 August 2013, Patriarch Kirill of Moscow consecrated the cornerstone of the cemetery church in honor of St. Sergius of Radonezh, which was opened in 2014. On 27 December 2013, the funeral of Mikhail Kalashnikov became the inaugural funeral held at the cemetery, conducted by Metropolitan Juvenally of Krutitsy and Kolomna.

== Design ==
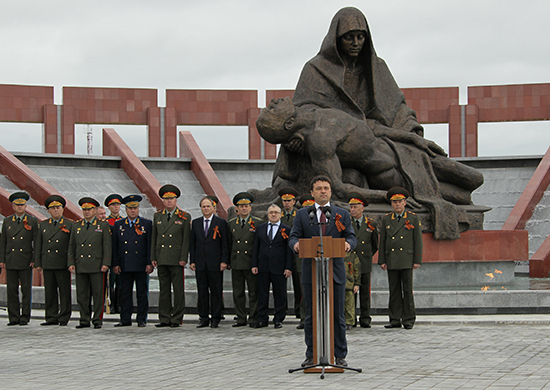
A monument at the ceremonies area

The award-winning artist and architect Sergey Vitalevich Goryaev served as artistic director of the project. According to the British newspaper The Daily Telegraph, the cemetery will be "a testament to extravagance, a piece of architectural monumentalism intended to reflect the glory of a resurgent Russia. Drawings show that the 132-acre (0.53 km^{2}) site will feature obelisks, golden statues of figures from Russia's past and friezes of workers in heroic poses. The cemetery will be richly adorned, using red and grey granite together with bronze". Goryaev died on 8 September 2013, just months after the cemetery's completion.

In 2015, monuments were planned to be installed on the first five graves. It is assumed that all the gravestones on the cemetery will be maintained in a uniform style and correspond to the three categories of burials. The contractor should have been selected by the competition, the documentation for which was developed by the specialists of the cemetery. The first contest was to be held in September 2015, but was canceled. The Ministry of Defense appealed to the sculptors and pointed to the obvious shortcomings in the sketches of monuments described in the tender documentation. For example, it turned out that the bust of military commanders was cut off exactly on half of the epaulettes. Neither the developers of the documentation, nor their curators in the management of the perpetuation of memory, this fact apparently did not embarrass. All cancellations of the contest were terminated, along with a behind-the-scenes scandal, resulting in several individuals from the cemetery administration being found guilty and subsequently fired.

Unique in the Russian monumental architecture and art ensemble is divided into four zones: entrance, production, ritual and burial area (including columbarium). For the construction granite and marble were used. At the main entrance to the necropolis are large steles. The black cubes at the crossing symbolize the views of the Armed Forces in the Great Patriotic War: the ground forces, the navy, the air force and the rear of the Armed Forces. The main central Alley is two kilometers long, along it are all architectural objects. The functional part consists of four pavilions, including the underground memorial hall, a ritual store, a cafeteria and a public toilet. The bridge, constructed above the beam, symbolically linking life to death, continues with the Alley of Heroes. On it, tracing the history of Russia from antiquity to the present day, 24 bronze figures of soldiers are installed in the stylized form of six historical epochs: from Dmitry Donskoy's warriors to modern special forces soldiers. On the other side of the bridge there is a ritual zone, two mourning houses, decorated in a single Shchusev style.

Funeral houses are rich in interior decoration in the form of mosaic panels. The first is decorated in a state-owned, powerful style, decorated with symbols in the form of Kremlin towers, a two-headed eagle. The second mourning house is decorated in a military style. At the end of the burial zone, the monument "Tribulation" is established: the mother with the dying warrior son. Before the sculpture is a bowl of water, symbolizing sadness, in the center of the water mirror the Eternal fire burns. On both sides of the Mall are 15 special sites intended for burial of the Supreme Commander-in-Chief of the Armed Forces of the Russian Federation. Land plots for permanent graves have an area of 5 sq.m. – 2.5 × 2 meters. Only one person can be buried in one section and subsequently his spouse or spouse.

With each burial of a military person, military honors are stipulated, regulated by the Charter of garrison and guard services of the Armed Forces of the Russian Federation. When burial of civilians, regulations are in place for burial according to the state protocol, where an honor guard, an orchestra, a solemn march are also provided.

A uniform regulation of tombstones is in place: a bust or bas-relief. The base and its base are made of natural stone (granite of black, red or gray colors). In some cases, they are made of bronze. Established not earlier than one year after the burial, relatives can choose only the color of the stone. Uniform requirements are also applied to the design of the memorial plate for the columbarium niche – it is made of bronze or black granite. An inscription with an honorary (military) rank (if any), a surname, a name, a patronymic, a date of birth and death is put on the memorial plate.

== Notable burials ==
- Yevgeny Barilovich (1932–2020), captain 1st rank, Hero of the Soviet Union
- Vladimir Chernavin (1928–2023), Admiral of the fleet, Commander-in-Chief of the Soviet Navy, Hero of the Soviet Union
- Aleksandr Denisov (1955–2020), lieutenant-general
- Mikhail Kalashnikov (1919–2013), lieutenant-general, Hero of the Russian Federation, creator of the Kalashnikov rifle
- Igor Kirillov (1970–2024), lieutenant-general, Hero of the Russian Federation, head of Russian NBC Protection Troops
- Nikolai Kuimov (1957–2021), lieutenant colonel, Hero of the Russian Federation
- Alexei Leonov (1934–2019), major-general, two times Hero of the Soviet Union, cosmonaut and first person to walk in space
- Nikolai Lukashevich (1941–2021), colonel-general
- Nikolai Moskvitelev (1926–2020), colonel-general
- Vasiliy Petrov (1917–2014), Marshal of the Soviet Union
- Vasily Reshetnikov (1919–2023), colonel-general, Deputy Commander-in-Chief of the Soviet Air Forces, Hero of the Soviet Union
- Vladimir Matyukhin, General of the Army
- Igor Rodionov (1936–2014), Defence Minister of the Russian Federation
- Yevgeny Shaposhnikov (1942–2020), Marshal of Aviation and the last Minister of Defence of the Soviet Union
- Vladimir Shatalov (1927–2021), lieutenant-general of the Air Force, two times Hero of the Soviet Union, cosmonaut
- Vladimir Shuralyov (1935–2020), Deputy Defence Minister of the Soviet Union
- Alexey Ivanovich Sorokin (1922–2020), Admiral of the Fleet
- Boris Tarasov (1932–2021), lieutenant-general
- Dmitry Utkin (1970–2023), lieutenant colonel, co-founder and military commander of the Wagner Group
- Dmitry Yazov (1924–2020), last Marshal of the Soviet Union, Minister of Defence
- Boris Utkin (1923–2023), retired Soviet Colonel General
- Bratislav Živković (1975–2025), Serbian mercenary

== See also ==
- Tomb of the Unknown Soldier (Moscow)
- Kremlin Wall Necropolis
- Novodevichy Cemetery
- List of national cemeteries by country
