= Fleet admiral (United States) =

Rank in the United States Navy

- Flag of the fleet admiral

- Fleet admiral collar device, shoulder board, and sleeve stripes.
- Country: United States
- Service branch: United States Navy
- Abbreviation: FADM
- Rank: Five-star
- NATO rank code: OF-10
- Formation: December 14, 1944
- Next lower rank: Admiral
- Equivalent ranks: General of the Army (U.S. Army); General of the Air Force (USAF)

Fleet admiral (abbreviated FADM) is a five-star flag officer rank in the United States Navy whose rewards uniquely include active duty pay for life. Fleet admiral ranks immediately above admiral and is equivalent to General of the Army and General of the Air Force. It is the same as the discontinued Admiral of the Navy.

Although it is a current and authorized rank, no U.S. Navy officer holds it at present. Only four officers have ever held the rank, all in the World War II era: William D. Leahy, Ernest J. King, Chester W. Nimitz, and William Halsey Jr. Leahy, King, and Nimitz were promoted to the rank in December 1944, followed by Halsey in December 1945. While all four men effectively retired in the late 1940s, the rank of fleet admiral is for life. The last living fleet admiral was Nimitz, who died in 1966.

== History ==
=== Post Spanish–American War ===
The Navy had a 5-star rank: Admiral of the Navy, established and given only to Admiral George Dewey in recognition of his victory at Manila Bay in 1898. Superior to Admiral, the rank used the 1867 regulation Admiral insignia. On March 2, 1899, Congress passed Pub. L. 55–378, approving the creation of the rank. The Senate confirmed Dewey's promotion to that rank on March 14, 1903, and he was officially promoted to Admiral of the Navy on March 24, 1903, with a retroactive date-of-rank of March 2, 1899. The congressional act also stipulated that upon Dewey's death, the rank would cease to exist. Dewey died on January 16, 1917, ending the Navy's use of the rank.

=== World War II ===
A proper five-star rank of fleet admiral was created in 1944 to give U.S. military officers comparable rank to five-star officers of allied nations. Congress created the rank of fleet admiral on December 14, 1944, via Pub.L. 78-482, which stipulated that up to four officers could hold the rank temporarily . The rank was made permanent for the four individual holders by Pub. L. 79–333 on March 23, 1946. There has been no new legislation authorizing the use of the rank of fleet admiral since then. (In 1950, Congress authorized the promotion to five-star rank of Omar Bradley, who was then serving as chairman of the Joint Chiefs of Staff, so that he would be of the same rank as General of the Army Douglas MacArthur, the theater commander in Korea.)

The rank of fleet admiral was held during and after World War II by four officers:

Name	Portrait	Position	Date of rank (age)	Retired	Deceased (age)
William D. Leahy		Chief of Staff to the Commander in Chief (The President)	15 December 1944 (69)	March 1949	20 July 1959 (84)
Ernest King		Chief of Naval Operations	17 December 1944 (66)	December 1945	25 June 1956 (77)
Chester W. Nimitz		Commander-in-Chief - Pacific Ocean Areas	19 December 1944 (59)	December 1947	20 February 1966 (80)
William Halsey Jr.		Commander-in-Chief - 3rd Fleet	11 December 1945 (63)	March 1947	16 August 1959 (76)

The timing of the first three appointments was carefully planned, such that a clear order of seniority and a near-equivalence between the services was established for the Generals of the Army promoted at the same time.

Admiral Leahy acted as an executive Chief of Staff over Admiral King and General Marshall and briefed President Franklin D. Roosevelt. King coordinated all naval operations. Nimitz commanded all naval operations in the Pacific Ocean area. Halsey received his promotion based on his successes.

George C. Marshall was promoted to General of the Army on December 16, 1944; General MacArthur was promoted on December 18, 1944; General Eisenhower was promoted on December 20, 1944, and General Arnold was promoted on December 21, 1944. Arnold would later be laterally promoted to General of the Air Force on May 7, 1949, after the Air Force was created as a separate service as part of the National Defense Act of 1947.

The insignia for a fleet admiral is composed of five silver stars in a pentagonal design. Worn on the service dress blue uniform sleeve was a gold stripe two inches wide surrounding the sleeve two inches from the cuff with four half-inch stripes placed at 1/4 inch intervals. The single gold five-pointed star, one ray down, worn above the top stripe was not part of the rank, but indicated the wearer to be a line officer.

=== Post–World War II ===
Another contender to receive the rank of fleet admiral was Admiral Raymond A. Spruance; the choice between him and Halsey was an issue that occupied several months of deliberation, before Admiral King finally chose Halsey. Purportedly U.S. Representative Carl Vinson, chairman of the House Armed Services committee and a strong supporter of Halsey, was responsible for blocking subsequent efforts to promote Spruance to fleet admiral (although his promotion continued to be blocked after Vinson retired). Instead, Spruance's achievements were recognized by the unique honor of a Special Act of Congress awarding him full four-star admiral's salary during the remainder of his life. Spruance expressed the following feelings over the issue:

So far as my getting five star rank is concerned, if I could have had it along with Bill Halsey, that would have been fine; but, if I had received it instead of Bill Halsey, I would have been very unhappy over it.

The first fleet admiral to leave active duty was Ernest King, who retired immediately after the conclusion of World War II. Chester Nimitz and William Halsey both retired two years later while William Leahy was the last fleet admiral to leave active duty in 1949. According to Public Law 78-482, fleet admirals on active duty receive the same pay as a Rear Admiral, Upper Half (two star) plus a $5,000 personal allowance, and upon retirement were to receive 75% of their active duty pay. When Public Law 79-333 made the rank permanent for Leahy, King, Nimitz, and Halsey, it also provided for full pay and allowances once those officers retired. As with a general of the army, a fleet admiral was entitled to an office maintained by the Navy along with an aide (of the Naval rank of Captain), a secretary, and an orderly.

Three of the four fleet admirals died in the late 1950s and, by 1960, Chester Nimitz was the sole surviving U.S. Navy fleet admiral. He held a ceremonial post as Navy adviser to the Western Sea Frontier with his quarters based in San Francisco. Nimitz died in 1966 with no further fleet admirals appointed since.

=== Modern usage ===
The president, with consent from the Senate, may award a fifth star to admirals. In the 1990s, there were proposals in Department of Defense academic circles to bestow a five-star rank on the office of the Chairman of the Joint Chiefs of Staff. Military leaders in the Global War on Terrorism can be promoted to a five-star rank.

== Ranks senior to fleet admiral ==
The Navy does not have an established rank senior to fleet admiral. The only officially recognized United States military rank senior to fleet admiral is General of the Armies when Congress passed Pub. L. 94–479 in 1976, promoting George Washington to that rank and making him senior to all other grades of the Army, past or present.

== See also ==
- United States Navy officer rank insignia
- List of U.S. military leaders by rank
- List of fleet and grand admirals
- List of comparative military ranks
- Admiral of the fleet as used in other countries
- Supreme Allied Commander
