= Vladimir Shuralyov =

Soviet and Russian military officer (1935–2020)

- Владимир Михайлович Шуралёв
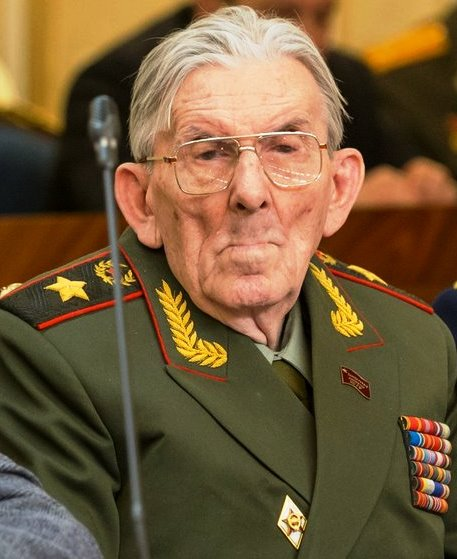
- Born: Vladimir Mikhailovich Shuralyov; 3 April 1935; Kovrov, Vladimir Oblast, Russian SFSR, Soviet Union
- Died: 2 March 2020 (aged 84); Moscow, Russia
- Burial place: Federal Military Memorial Cemetery, Moscow Oblast
- Military career
- Allegiance: USSR; Russia
- Branch: Soviet Army; Russian Army
- Service years: 1955–1992
- Rank: Army General
- Commands: 8th Tank Army; 2nd Guards Tank Army; Belorussian Military District; Vystrel course
- Awards: Order of Honour; Order of Lenin; Order of the October Revolution; Order of the Red Star; Order "For Service to the Homeland in the Armed Forces of the USSR" Third Class; Patriotic Order of Merit in Gold

Vladimir Mikhailovich Shuralyov (Russian: Владимир Михайлович Шуралёв; 3 April 1935 – 2 March 2020) was a Soviet and later Russian military officer who held a number of posts in the Soviet Army, reaching the rank of army general.

Drafted into the Soviet Army in 1955, Shuralyov trained in armoured and tank warfare at the Tashkent Higher Tank Command School, furthering his studies at the Military Academy of the Armoured Forces from which he graduated in 1965. From then on he was appointed as chief of staff and command positions of larger armoured unit formations, from battalions to divisions. He served in several of the Soviet Union's military districts, taking command of the 8th Tank Army in 1979. This was followed by the command of the 2nd Guards Tank Army, part of the Group of Soviet Forces in Germany, and then the Belorussian Military District in 1985. From 1989 he was the representative of the commander-in-chief of the Warsaw Pact armed forces in the National People's Army of the German Democratic Republic, and in 1990 became a Deputy Minister of Defence and Chief Inspector of the Ministry of Defence. His final active role was to command the Vystrel higher officer courses, before his retirement in 1992.

In retirement Shuralyov became a leading analyst at the Office of Inspectors General and a consultant for the General Staff of the Armed Forces. He was a member of the central council of political party A Just Russia, and had received a number of awards and honours over his career, including the Order of Honour, Order of Lenin, Order of the October Revolution, Order of the Red Star and the Order "For Service to the Homeland in the Armed Forces of the USSR" Third Class. Shuralyov died in 2020 from injuries sustained after being struck by a van.

== Early life and career ==
Shuralyov was born in 1935 in Kovrov, Vladimir Oblast, which was then part of the Russian SFSR, in the Soviet Union. He studied while working as head of a repair station on the construction of the Kumertau-Tyurgan railway, in the Bashkir Autonomous Soviet Socialist Republic. After graduating from the Kovrov College of Railway Transport in 1955 he was drafted into the Soviet Army. He trained initially at the Tashkent Higher Tank Command School, graduating in 1958, and was sent to serve with the Group of Soviet Forces in Germany. He joined the Communist Party of the Soviet Union in 1959.

== Command positions ==
Shuralyov graduated from the Military Academy of the Armoured Forces in 1965, and went on to command a tank battalion in the Kiev Military District. From 1967 he was chief of staff of a tank regiment, and its commander from 1970. In 1971 he became chief of staff of a motorized rifle division, serving in the Kiev Military District and the Transbaikal Military District until 1973. He graduated from the Military Academy of the General Staff in 1975, and took command of a tank division in the Baltic Military District. In 1977 he became first deputy commander, and from January 1979 commander, of the 8th Tank Army, deployed in the Carpathian Military District. This was soon followed in July 1980 with the position of commander of the 2nd Guards Tank Army, part of the Group of Soviet Forces in Germany. In March 1984 he was advanced to become first deputy commander-in-chief of the Group of Soviet Forces in Germany, having been promoted to lieutenant-general on 30 October 1981.

In February 1985 Shuralyov was appointed commander of the Belorussian Military District, being promoted to colonel-general on 29 April that year. In January 1989 he became the representative of the commander-in-chief of the Warsaw Pact armed forces in the National People's Army of the German Democratic Republic, and was a deputy commander at the Strategic Arms Limitation Talks in 1989 for the Warsaw Pact member countries. From 1990 to December 1991 he was a Deputy Minister of Defence and Chief Inspector of the Ministry of Defence, after which he was in charge of the Vystrel higher officer courses. He was a candidate member of the Central Committee of the Communist Party of the Soviet Union between 1986 and 1990.

== Retirement ==
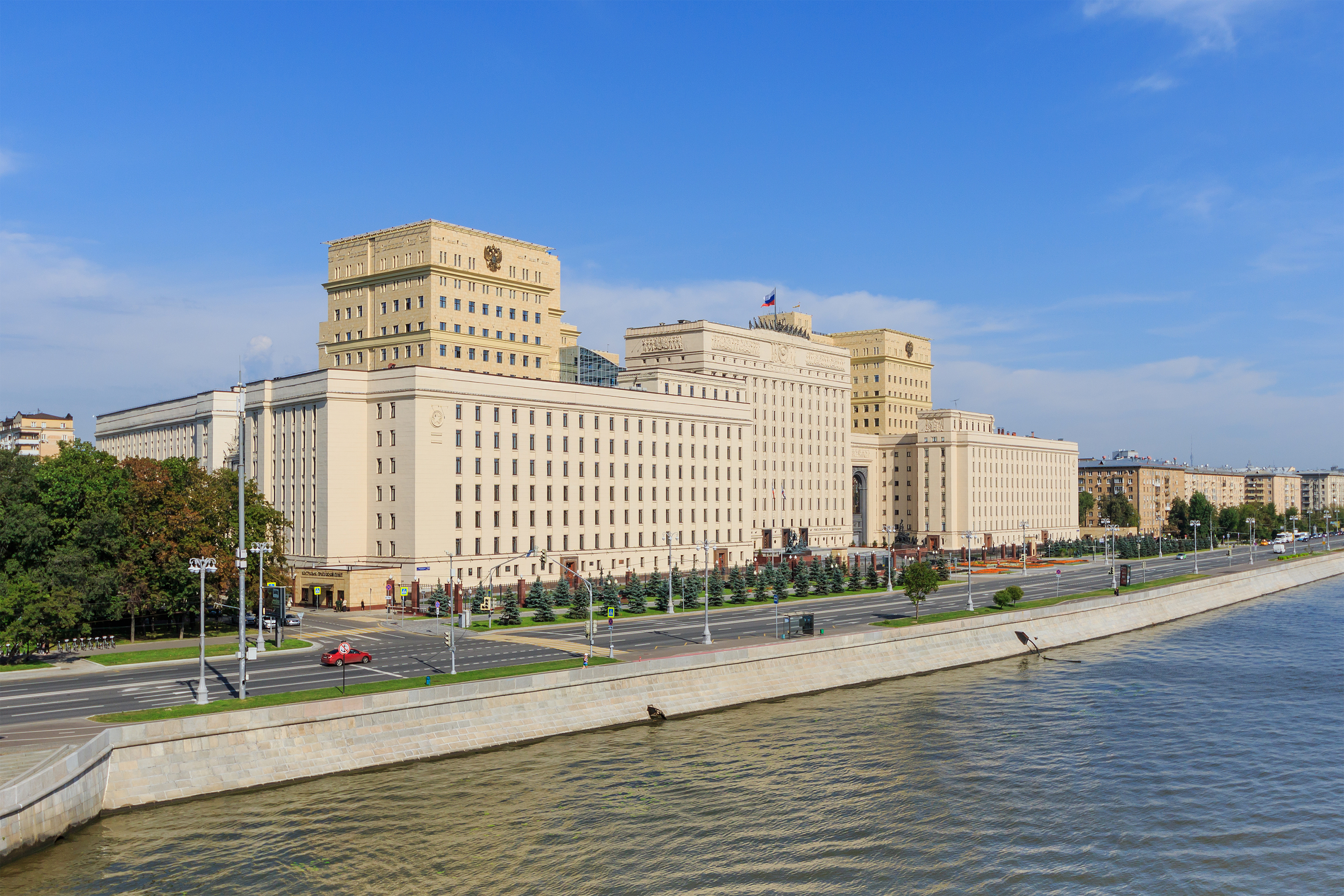
The Main Building of the Ministry of Defence in Moscow. In retirement Shuralyov worked as an analyst and consultant for the ministry.

Shuralyov retired from active service in April 1992, and became a leading analyst at the Office of Inspectors General of the Ministry of Defence of the Russian Federation, as well as a consultant for the General Staff of the Armed Forces. He was a member of the political party A Just Russia, and a member of its central council. In February 2020 Shuralyov attended the funeral of Dmitry Yazov, the last Marshal of the Soviet Union, which took place at the Federal Military Memorial Cemetery.

== Death and honours ==
Shuralyov died in Moscow on 2 March 2020 at the age of 84, after sustaining injuries when he was struck by the driver of a reversing van near his house on 1 March. A criminal case was opened against the driver. Shuralyov was buried on 5 March in the Federal Military Memorial Cemetery in a funeral ceremony led by Commander-in-Chief of the Russian Ground Forces Oleg Salyukov and attended by around 500 people.

He had received a number of awards and honours over his career, including the Order of Honour, Order of Lenin, Order of the October Revolution, Order of the Red Star and the Order "For Service to the Homeland in the Armed Forces of the USSR" Third Class.
