= Marshal of the Russian Federation =

Highest Russian military rank

Marshal of the Russian Federation Маршал Российской Федерации
- Marshal's star – big

- The insignia used from 2010
- Country: Russia
- Service branch: Russian Armed Forces
- Rank group: General officer
- Rank: Five-star rank
- Formation: 11 February 1993
- Next lower rank: Army general
- Equivalent ranks: Marshal of the Soviet Union

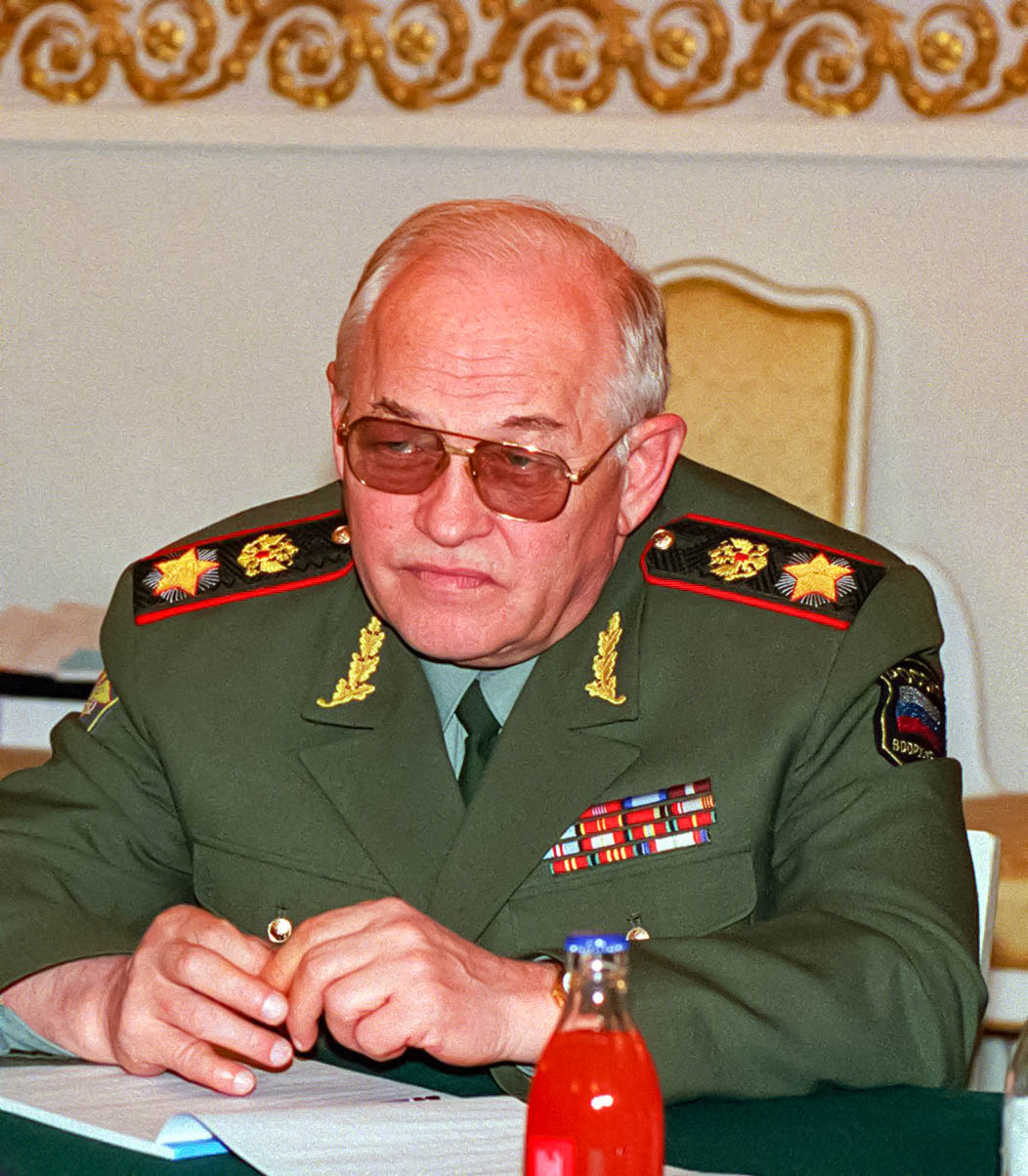
Marshal of the Russian Federation Igor Sergeyev

Marshal of the Russian Federation (Russian: Маршал Российской Федерации, romanized: Marshal Rossiyskoy Federatsii) is the highest military rank of Russia, created in 1993 following the dissolution of the Soviet Union. It ranks immediately above Army general and Admiral of the fleet (also called Fleet Admiral in some English-language texts), and is considered the successor to the Soviet-era rank of Marshal of the Soviet Union.

A Marshal of the Russian Federation outranks Generals of the Army (four stars), Colonel-Generals (three stars), Lieutenant-Generals (two stars) and Major-Generals (one star). It is roughly equivalent to American General of the Army and the British Field Marshal.

The only officer so far to have held the rank was Igor Sergeyev, the former Minister of Defence, who had been elevated from the General of the Army of the Strategic Rocket Forces. Sergeyev was a Marshal of the Russian Federation from 1997 until his death in 2006.

The insignia for Marshal of the Russian Federation is similar to the one for the Marshal of the Soviet Union, with the Soviet emblem replaced by the Russian coat of arms. An officer who is given this rank would also wear the Marshal's star.

== Rank insignia ==
Rank insignia Marshal of the Russian Federation

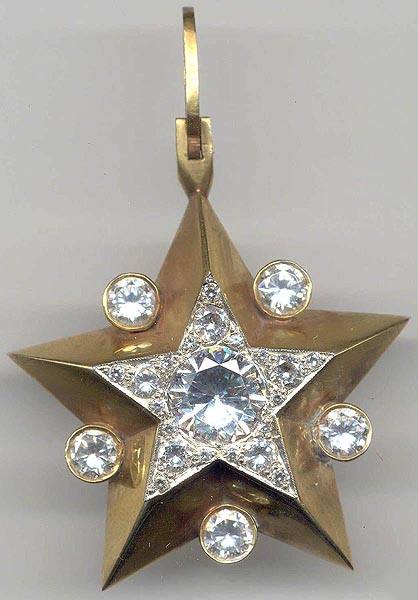
Marshal's star

Parade uniform
(1997–2010)

Service uniform (1997–2010)

Field uniform
(1997–2010)

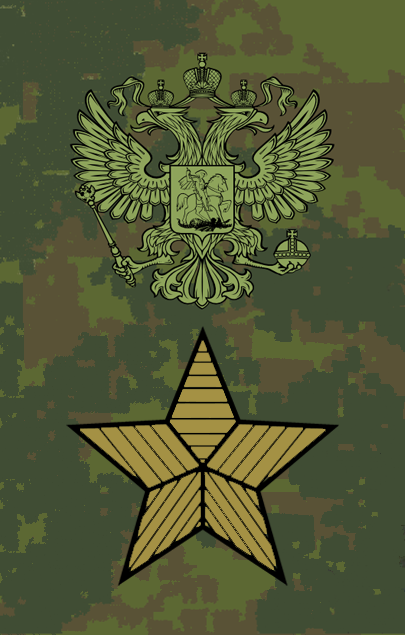
Field uniform
(2010–present)

== See also ==
- Army ranks and insignia of the Russian Federation
- Marshal of the Soviet Union
- Field marshal (Russia)
