= Yevgeny Barilovich =

Soviet naval officer (1932–2020)

- Native name: Евгений Алексеевич Барилович
- Born: 30 October 1932; Moscow, Russian SFSR, Soviet Union
- Died: 5 March 2020 (aged 87) Moscow, Russian Federation
- Buried: Federal Military Memorial Cemetery
- Allegiance: Soviet Union; Russia
- Branch: Soviet Navy
- Service years: 1951–1985
- Rank: Captain 1st Rank
- Awards: Hero of the Soviet Union; Order of Lenin; Order of the Red Banner; Medal "For Battle Merit"

Yevgeny Alekseyevich Barilovich (Russian: Евгений Алексеевич Барилович; 30 October 1932 – 5 March 2020) was an officer in the Soviet Navy. Part of the submarine branch, he rose to command his own vessels, reaching the rank of captain 1st rank. In 1979 he was awarded the title of Hero of the Soviet Union.

== Career ==
Barilovich was born on 30 October 1932 in Moscow, then part of the Russian Soviet Socialist Federative Republic, in the Soviet Union. He took ten classes of schooling, and after graduating from the Saratov Naval Preparatory School in 1951, entered the Soviet Navy. Barilovich graduated from the Higher Naval School of Submarine Navigation in 1955 and was sent to serve aboard submarines in the Black Sea Fleet. He took the Higher Special Officer Classes of the Navy, graduating in 1965, and from 1966 was in command of his own submarines, specialising in testing new equipment and weapons systems.

Barilovich's service was rewarded on 10 January 1979 by a decree of the Presidium of the Supreme Soviet awarding him the title of Hero of the Soviet Union, with the concurrent award of the Order of Lenin and gold star. The award, for "courage and heroism in the performance of military duty", was number 11425. He also received the Order of the Red Banner during his time in service.

Barilovich retired at the rank of captain 1st rank in 1985 and settled in Moscow, where he worked as head of the production preparation bureau of the Lianozovsky Electromechanical Plant. He died on 5 March 2020, with his death was reported on 11 March 2020 in Krasnaya Zvezda, the news outlet of the Russian Ministry of Defence. He was buried in the Federal Military Memorial Cemetery.
