= Marshal's star =

Soviet and Russian military badge of rank

Marshal's Star
- Marshal's Star (large)
- Country: USSR
- Status: No longer awarded
- Established: 2 September 1940
- First award: September 1940

Highlights
- Total: ~570
- Marshal's Star (small)

The Marshal's Star (Russian: маршальская звезда, romanized: marshalskaya zvezda) is an additional badge of rank worn by marshals of the armed forces of the Soviet Union, and subsequently the Russian Federation.

== Overview ==
The armed forces of the Soviet Union and the Russian Federation have two such insignia for higher military ranks, both in the form of a five-pointed star of gold and platinum with diamonds. They are worn around the neck when in parade uniform (originally under the collar of the parade tunic, since 1955 on top of the necktie). There are two different sizes of star available, with the official name, size and number of diamonds corresponding to the marshal's rank. Informally they are known as the "Large Marshal's Star" and the "Small Marshal's Star". The official names of the Marshal's Stars have changed over time, depending on which ranks received the right to wear them.

The Marshal's Stars correspond with the Western use of the marshal's baton. On the death of the recipient, the award is returned to the Diamond Fund for re-use.

Marshal's Stars were first awarded to holders of the ranks Marshal of the Soviet Union and Admiral of the Fleet of the Soviet Union. In time, smaller stars were awarded to chief marshals of the branch, marshals of the branch, Army Generals and Fleet Admirals.

== Large Marshal's Star ==
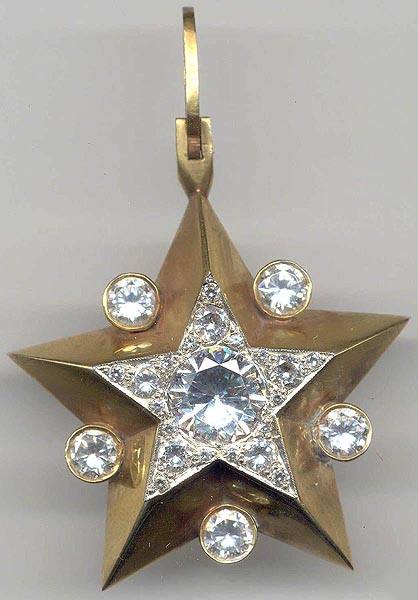
Large Marshal's Star

=== Description ===
It is a gold five-pointed star with smooth diagonal rays on the front side. In the center is a platinum, five-pointed star with diamonds. The diamonds in the center have a total weight of 2.62 carats and in the rays there are 25 diamonds weighing a total of 1.25 carats. Between the edges of rays are 5 diamonds weighing a total of 3.06 carats. The diameter of the gold star is 44.5 millimetres (1.75 in) and the platinum stars are 23 millimetres (0.91 in) in diameter. The star has a depth of 8 millimetres (0.31 in).

The Marshal's Star has a triangular eyelet in the upper beam which is connected to an oval eyelet measuring 14 millimetres (0.55 in). The Marshal's Star is suspended by a 25 millimetres (0.98 in) moire ribbon. The total weight of the Large Marshal's Star is 36.8 grams (1.30 oz). Approximately 200 of this type of Marshal's Star were produced.

=== Use in the Soviet Union ===
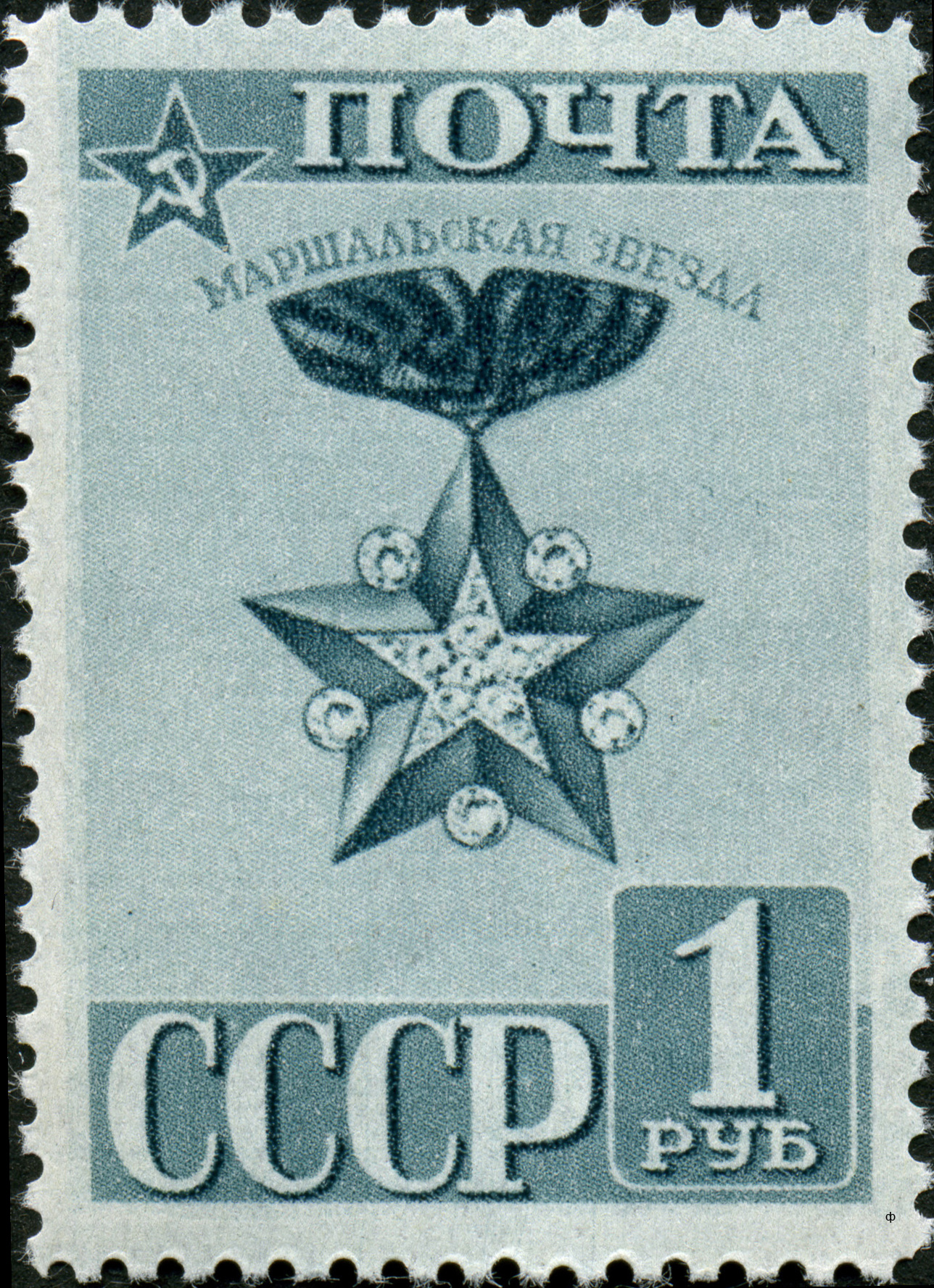
Marshal's star on a 1941 stamp

The Large Marshal's Star was the distinction insignia for OF10-ranks as follows:

- From 2 September 1940 for holders of the rank of Marshal of the Soviet Union
- From 3 March 1955 for holders of the rank Admiral of the Fleet of the Soviet Union

=== Use in the Russian Federation ===
In the armed forces of the Russian Federation, the Large Marshal's Star was the defining insignia for marshals of the Russian Federation from 1993 until 21 January 1997.

== Small Marshal's Star ==
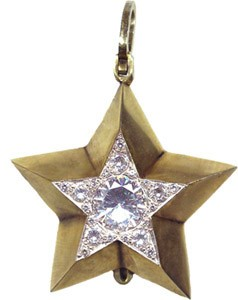
Small Marshal's Star

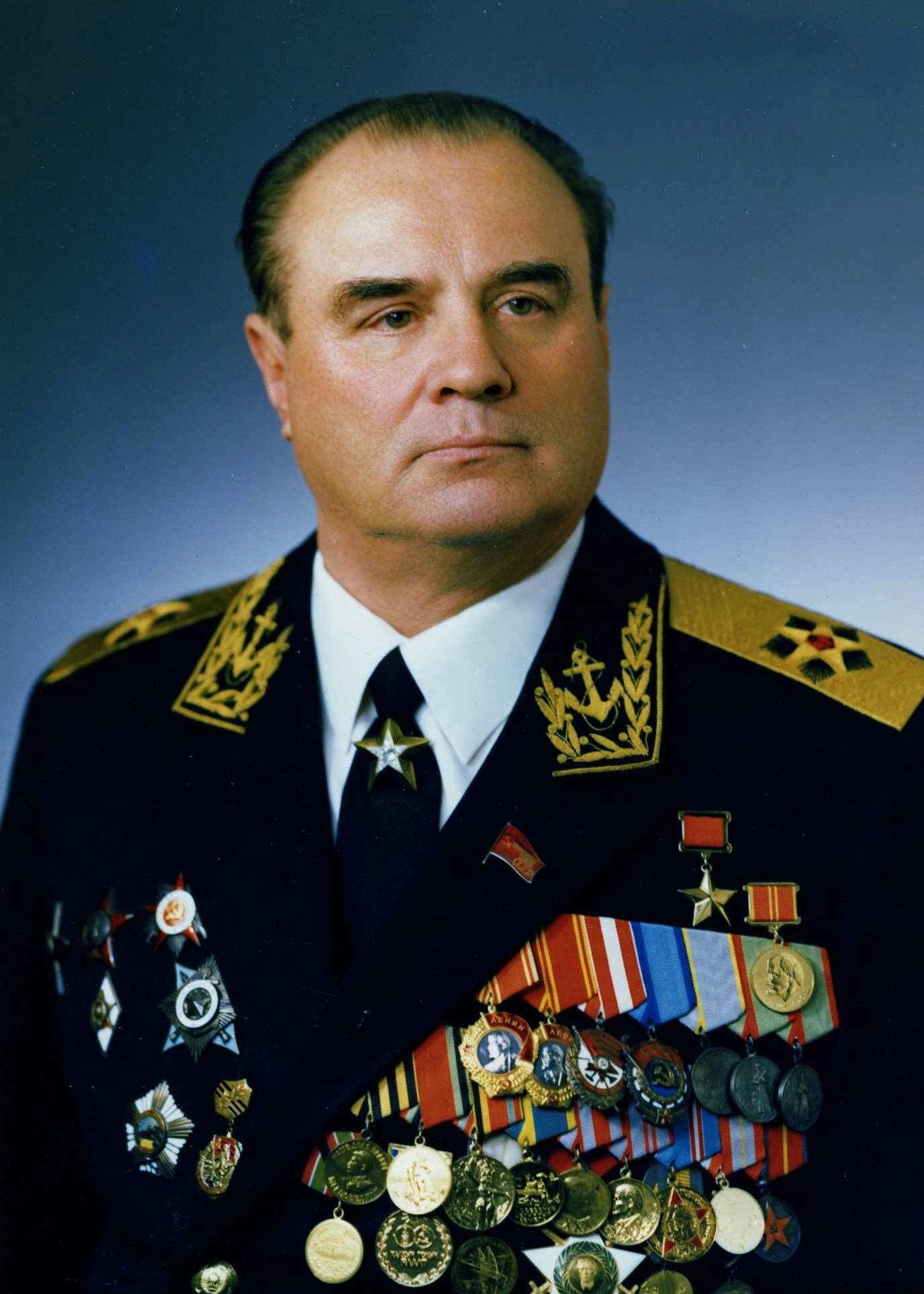
Fleet Admiral Nikolay Smirnov wearing his Small Marshal's Star on top of his necktie

=== Description ===
The decoration is a five-pointed gold star with smooth dihedral rays on the obverse. On top of the gold star there is a smaller five-pointed star made of platinum. In the center of the platinum star there is a 2.04-carat diamond. In the rays of platinum star there are twenty-five 0.91-carat diamonds. The total diameter of the gold star is 42 millimetres (1.7 in) and it weighs 35.1 grams (1.24 oz). It is connected to a moire ribbon in the same way as the large star. About 370 Small Marshal's Stars have been produced.

=== Use in the Soviet Union ===
The "Small Marshal's Star" was the distinction insignia for OF9 ranks as follows:

- From February 27, 1943, for the following marshal of the branch ranks:
  - Marshal of the Artillery, Marshal of Aviation and Marshal of the Armored Troops
- From March 20, 1944, for:
  - Marshal of the Signal Troops and Marshal of Engineer Troops
- From June 5, 1962: Fleet Admiral
- From November 1, 1972: Army General

There was no formal decree pertaining to use the Small Marshal's Star as distinction insignia to chief marshal of the branch ranks. However, after promotion from marshal of the branch to chief marshal of the branch the appropriate general officers continued to wear the Small Marshal's Star.

=== Use in the Russian Federation ===
In the armed forces of the Russian Federation, the Marshal's Star was a defining symbol for the ranks general of the army and admiral of the fleet. It has not been awarded since the collapse of the Soviet Union.

== Ribbons ==
A Marshal of the Soviet Union's star used a red satin ribbon suspension; ribbons for marshals of a branch varied accordingly: gold for artillery, light blue for aviation, burgundy for armoured troops, crimson for engineers, blue for signals, and turquoise for the navy.

== See also ==
- Marshal's baton
