= Admiral of the fleet =

Military naval officer of the highest rank

An admiral of the fleet or shortened to fleet admiral is a senior naval flag officer rank, usually equivalent to field marshal and marshal of the air force. An admiral of the fleet is typically senior to an admiral.

It is also a generic term for a senior admiral in command of a large group of ships, comprising a fleet or, in some cases, a group of fleets. If actually a rank, its name can vary depending on the country. In addition to "fleet admiral" and "admiral of the fleet", such rank names include "admiral of the navy" and "grand admiral".

== Usage in specific countries ==
The following articles contain specific information on the rank as it pertains to individual countries:

- Admiral of the fleet (Australia)
- Admiral flote (Croatia)
- Admiral of the fleet (Russia)
  - Admiral of the fleet (Soviet Union)
- Admiral of the fleet (Sri Lanka)
- Chom phon ruea (Thailand)
- Admiral of the fleet (Turkey)
- Admiral flote (Socialist Federal Republic of Yugoslavia)
- Admiral of the fleet (United Kingdom)
- Fleet admiral (United States)
  - Admiral of the Navy (United States) (1903-1917)

Ambiguity exists when translating the French amiral into English (into admiral of the fleet or admiral). A French title of amiral de la flotte, outranking a full admiral was created in 1939 for Darlan, who was the only person in French history to hold that title. Amiral de la flotte became a rank in 1942, when Darlan was commander in chief of the military forces of the Vichy Regime. The rank of Amiral de la flotte was still mentioned in French laws in 1957.

== NATO code ==
While the rank of admiral of the fleet/fleet admiral is used in some of NATO countries, it is ranked differently depending on the country.

NATO code	Country	English equivalent	
NATO code	Country	UK	US
OF-10	Croatia, Portugal	Admiral of the Fleet	Fleet admiral
OF-8	Poland	Vice admiral	Vice admiral

== Gallery ==
Almirante-da-Armada
(Angolan Navy)

Admiral of the fleet
(Royal Australian Navy)

Laksamana armada
(Royal Brunei Navy)

Admiral flote
(Croatian Navy)

Admiral of the fleet
(Indian Navy)

Laksamana armada
(Royal Malaysian Navy)

Admiral of the fleet
(Nigerian Navy)

Admiral of the fleet
(Royal New Zealand Navy)

Admirał floty
(Polish Navy)

Almirante da Armada
(Portuguese Navy)

Адмирал флота
Admiral flota
(Russian Navy)

Admiral of the fleet
(Sri Lanka Navy)

Flot admiraly
(Turkmen Naval Forces)

Admiral of the Fleet
(Royal Navy)

Fleet admiral
(United States Navy)

== See also ==
- List of fleet and grand admirals
- Admiralissimo
