= Ivan Isakov =

Soviet Armenian Admiral of the Fleet (1894–1967)

Admiral of the Fleet of the Soviet Union Ivan Isakov
- Հովհաննես Իսակով
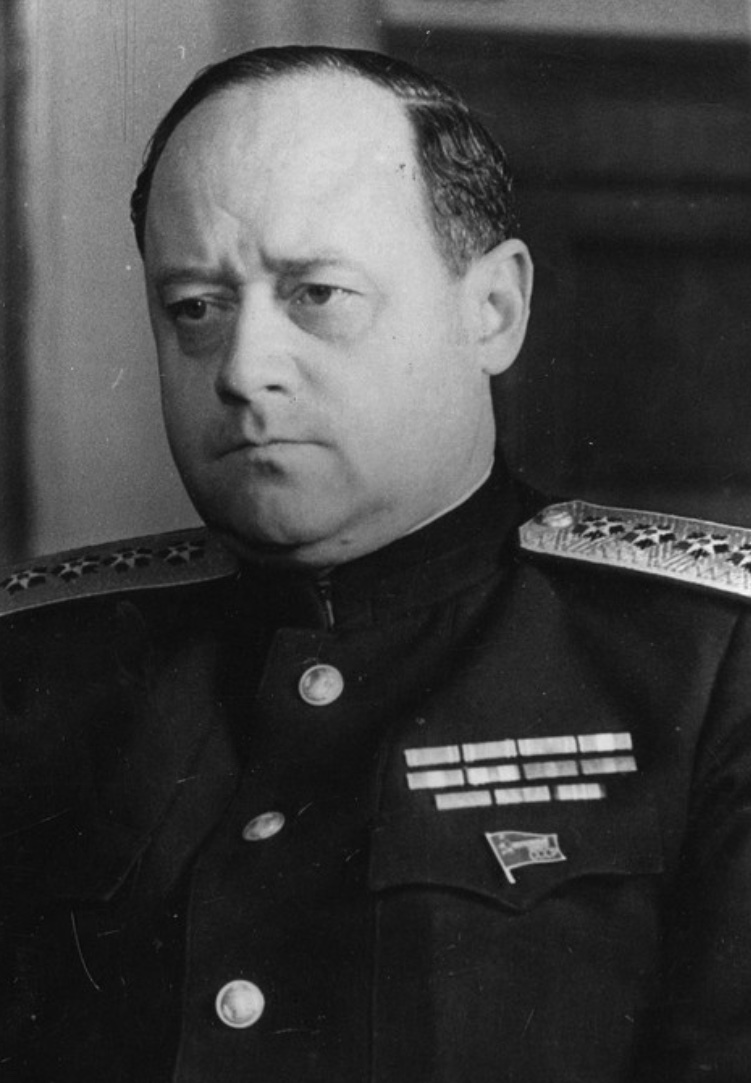
- Isakov in 1945

Chief of the Naval Staff
- In office 23 October 1940 – 21 April 1945
- Preceded by: Lev Haller
- Succeeded by: Vladimir Alafuzov

Personal details
- Born: 22 August 1894 Hadjikend, Kars Oblast, Russian Empire
- Died: 11 October 1967 (aged 73) Moscow, Soviet Union
- Resting place: Novodevichy Cemetery
- Citizenship: Soviet
- Awards: Hero of the Soviet Union see below

Military service
- Allegiance: Soviet Union
- Branch/service: Soviet Navy
- Years of service: 1917–1967
- Rank: Admiral of the Fleet of the Soviet Union
- Commands: Chief of the Naval Staff; Baltic Fleet; Naval Academy
- Battles/wars: World War I; Russian Civil War; World War II; Winter War; North Caucasus Front; Kerch–Eltigen operation

Ivan Stepanovich Isakov (Armenian: Հովհաննես Իսակով, Russian: Иван Степанович Исаков; 22 August [O.S. 10 August] 1894 – 11 October 1967), born Hovhannes Ter-Isahakyan, was a Soviet Armenian military commander, Chief of Staff of the Soviet Navy, Deputy USSR Navy Minister, and held the rank of Admiral of the Fleet of the Soviet Union. He played a crucial role in shaping the Soviet Navy, particularly the Baltic and Black Sea flotillas during the Second World War. Aside from his military career, Isakov became a member and writer of the oceanographic committee of the Soviet Union Academy of Sciences in 1958 and, in 1967, became an honorary member of the Armenian Soviet Socialist Republic's Academy of Sciences.

== Early life ==
Ivan Isakov was born Hovhannes Ter-Isahakyan in the family of an Armenian railway worker in the village of Hadjikend in the Kars Oblast, then a part of the Russian Empire (currently the Kars vilayet of Turkey). He changed his name after Russian Revolution. His father died soon after he was born. Afterward, his mother raised their three children with her brother. His uncle had dreamed of service in the navy and had a library of marine literature, which inspired an identical love of watercraft for Isakov. The family later moved to Tiflis, where he studied mathematics and engineering at the local realschule, which Isakov graduated from in 1913.

== Military service ==
In 1917, Isakov moved to Petrograd and entered the Naval Guards School of the Imperial Russian Navy and graduated as a midshipman in March of that year. He briefly saw action against the Germans in West Estonian archipelago (Moonsund archipelago). He continued his service after the October Revolution in the Baltic Sea fleet as a torpedo officer, where he served on several warships, including the Izyaslav, the Riga, the Kobchik and the Korshun. In 1918, he took part in several battles against the German Imperial Navy until the signing of the Treaty of Brest-Litovsk, which effectively ended the war between Russia and Germany, granting the Baltic Sea to the latter. In March 1918, Isakov participated in the Ice Cruise of the Baltic Fleet from the naval base at Helsingfors where Russian warships and icebreakers were transferred from the Baltic to the naval base in Kronshtadt near Petrograd. An authoritative Russian Navy source notes that Isakov completed additional courses in mine-sweeping and mine-laying in 1919 and then served in the Caspian Sea, returning to the Baltic in 1920 and subsequently serving in the Black Sea until the mid-1920s.

In 1920, Isakov was transferred and assigned to the destroyer Deyatelni, which patrolled from the Volga River down to the Caspian Sea and later shelled the positions of Allied interventionist forces in the midst of the Russian Civil War. Noted for his distinction during the battles, he was made the gun battery commander of the destroyer Izyaslav in 1921. From 1922 to 1927, he served as a shtab operative, or member of the deputy chief of staff, of naval forces in the Black Sea Fleet. In 1928, Isakov completed academic courses at the Naval Academy in Leningrad and from 1930, he was Chief of Staff of the Baltic Fleet. In 1932, Isakov became the professor and head of the naval art department of the Soviet Naval Military Academy and taught as a professor for five years until he was promoted commander of the Baltic Fleet. From 1938 to 1939, he headed the Naval Academy. Isakov was appointed vice-commissar of naval affairs, and in March 1939, he arrived in New York City on the RMS Aquitania, leading a naval delegation to the United States with the goal of purchasing new warships. He met with the Secretary of the Navy, but the delegation left empty-handed due to a multitude of factors. Isakov broke away from teaching with the onset of the Winter War and entered active service; he coordinated not only the movement of naval warships in the Baltic Sea but also the ground forces of the Red Army in the Soviet war against Finland. From 1941 to 1943, Isakov was the chief of the Main Maritime Staff. From 1946 to 1947, he was chief of the Main Navy Staff. From 1947 to 1950, he was deputy commander-in-chief of the navy. From 1950 to 1956, he was deputy Naval Minister. From 1957, he was a member of the Defense Ministry General Inspectorate.

=== World War II ===
With the German invasion of the Soviet Union in 1941, the Soviet Navy's manpower drastically decreased because men were needed to stave off the advances made by the German armies. Nevertheless, Isakov temporarily served in the Soviet Red Banner Northern Fleet until 1942 when he became a commander in the North Caucasus Front, where German forces were attempting to penetrate the oil fields of Baku. There, he was a member of the North-Caucasian Directive, a military council which planned operations and directed naval forces defending in the region. He was responsible for the successful naval landing by Soviet forces on the Kerch Peninsula (the Kerch–Eltigen Operation), then held by German forces. On 4 October 1942, Isakov was injured in a German bombing raid in Tuapse and had his leg amputated, spending the remainder of the war in a field hospital. Nevertheless, Isakov continued to serve in his capacity as chief of staff of Soviet naval forces. After the war, during a celebratory banquet for the Politburo and marshals, on 24 May 1945, Stalin walked all the way to his distant table to clink glasses in a toast to his efforts.

=== Admiralship and scholarly work ===
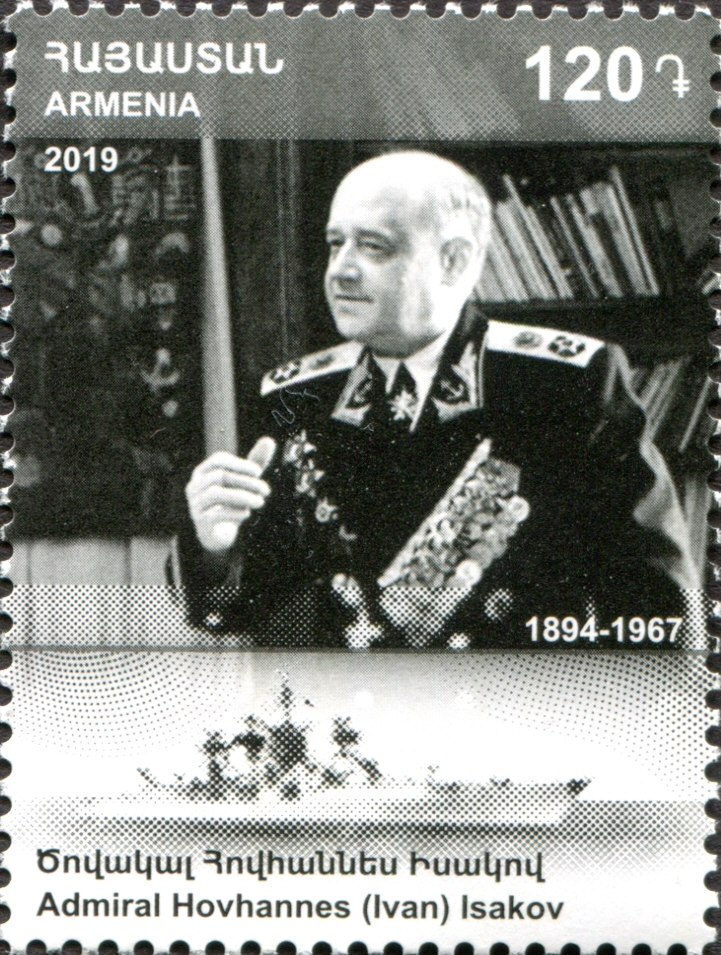
Isakov on a 2019 stamp of Armenia

In March 1955, Isakov was promoted to the service rank of Admiral of the Fleet of the Soviet Union, one of only three to hold that rank, but he also managed to find the time for scholarly work. After becoming a professor in 1932, Isakov had spent much of his time researching military naval tactics and strategy. From 1932 to 1933, he had participated in a Soviet military report, which examined German naval, particularly submarine, tactics used during battles in the First World War. He received his Doktor nauk in 1937 after defending his dissertation on the routing of German forces by the Imperial Japanese Navy in the Battle of Tsingtao in 1914. In 1947, Isakov was appointed editor and president of The Atlas of the Sea, a three-volume work on the charting of naval routes, the mapping of the seafloor and the physical landscape of the oceans and the history of naval warfare. The work went on to receive the 1951 Stalin Prize. Other prestigious positions Isakov went on to hold was editor and adviser in the writing of the Great Soviet Encyclopedia. In 1958, he became a Corresponding Member of the USSR Academy of Sciences. Isakov became a member of the Writers' Union of the USSR in 1964.

By decree of the Supreme Soviet of the Soviet Union on 7 May 1965, "For his able leadership of the troops, courage, bravery and heroism in the fight against the Nazi invaders, and in commemoration of the 20th anniversary of the victory in the Great Patriotic War," Fleet Admiral Isakov was awarded the title of Hero of the Soviet Union.

== Appraisal, critics and legacy ==
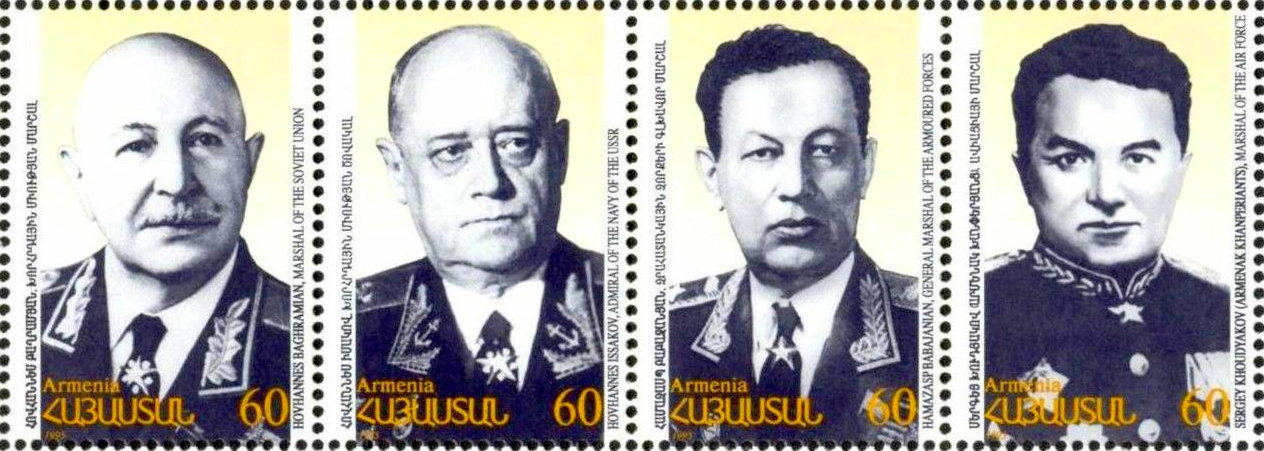
World War II Armenian heroes stamps: Bagramyan, Isakov, Babadzhanian, Khudyakov

As a naval commander, Isakov has been described by one military historian as "more a naval practitioner than a theoretician" who "emphasized that the theory of the command of the sea was a rational theory."

Academician Abraham Alikhanov wrote that Joseph Stalin said, "A real admiral of the fleet, Comrade Isakov. Clever, just one leg, but also one strong head."

As a Russified Armenian, Isakov's personal worldview and identification can be characterized as a Great Russian's own instead of a Soviet's. In January 1965, Isakov wrote in the newspaper Nedelya that "for centuries foreign enemies have tried to close for the Russian people all exits to the sea." Then he recalled, how "Astrakhan's kingdom has blocked the Caspian Sea. In the Baltic the role of Cerberus was played in turn by the Livonian Knights, the Hanseatic League and later Sweden". Isakov concluded "The fortress Oreshek or Schlüsselburg has remained in the mouth of the Neva to this very day as a reminder of how afraid they were of letting the Russians out of Lake Ilmen."

On the basis of this article, Ivan Dziuba, a Ukrainian-born Soviet philologist and a staunch Leninist, criticized Isakov strongly in his book Internationalism or Russification (1968) for repeating "what was written by the propagandists of tsarist times and in their falsified history textbooks," an attitude "which looked on the whole surrounding world whether it was in the way of Russia or not, whether it satisfied the appetites of tsarism or not." Dziuba used Isakov as an example of how tsarist Russia was identified completely with the contemporary USSR and how Great Russian chauvinism had surpassed "the Communist class approach" with "a pitiable Shulgin-type interpretation of the grandiose class battle of the proletariat, of the grandiose drama of universal history!"

Both the Soviet Union and Armenia have issued postage stamps dedicated to Isakov. An avenue in Yerevan is named after him, as well as a former Soviet cruiser and a Russian frigate.

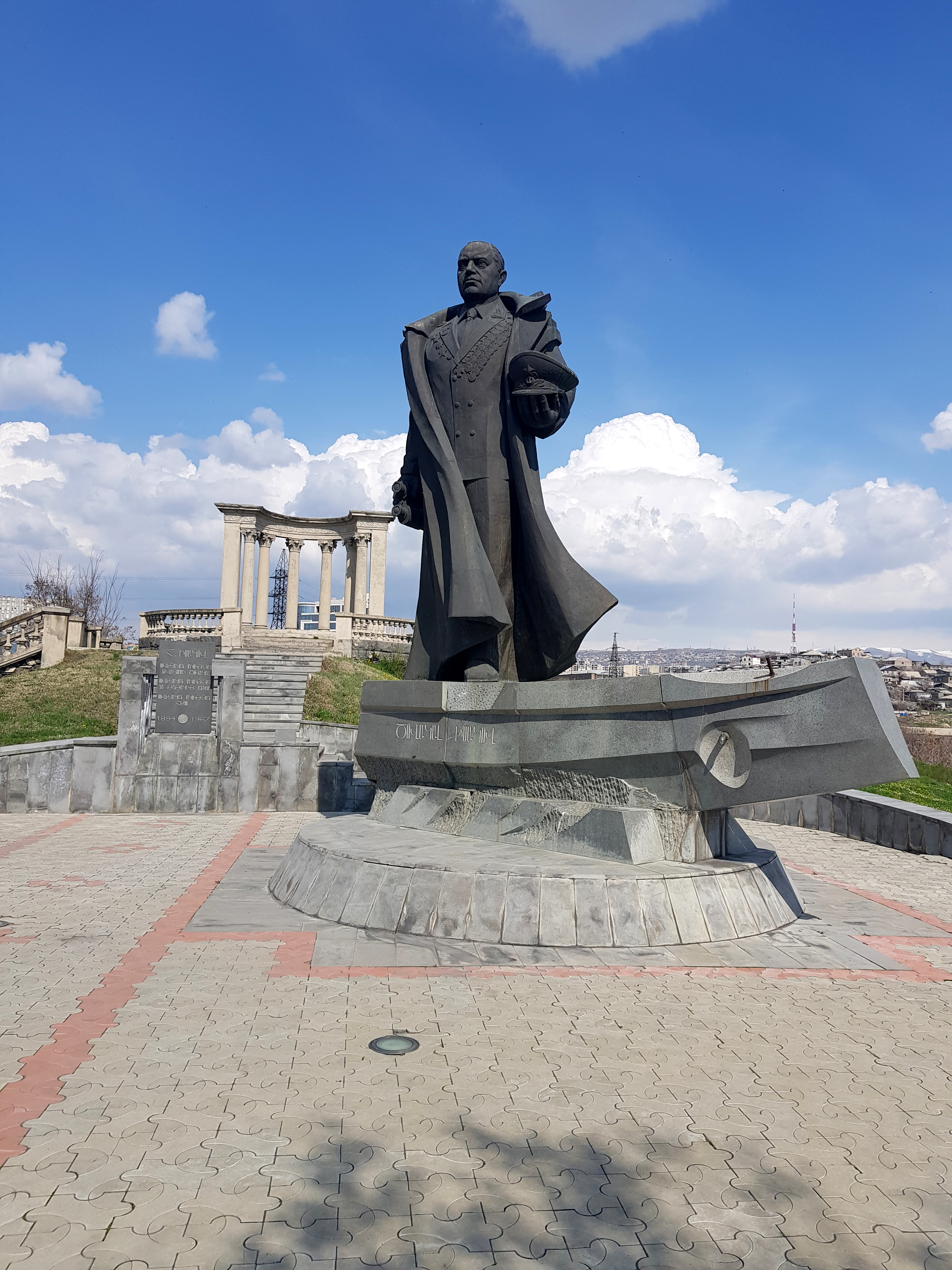
Memorial in Yerevan

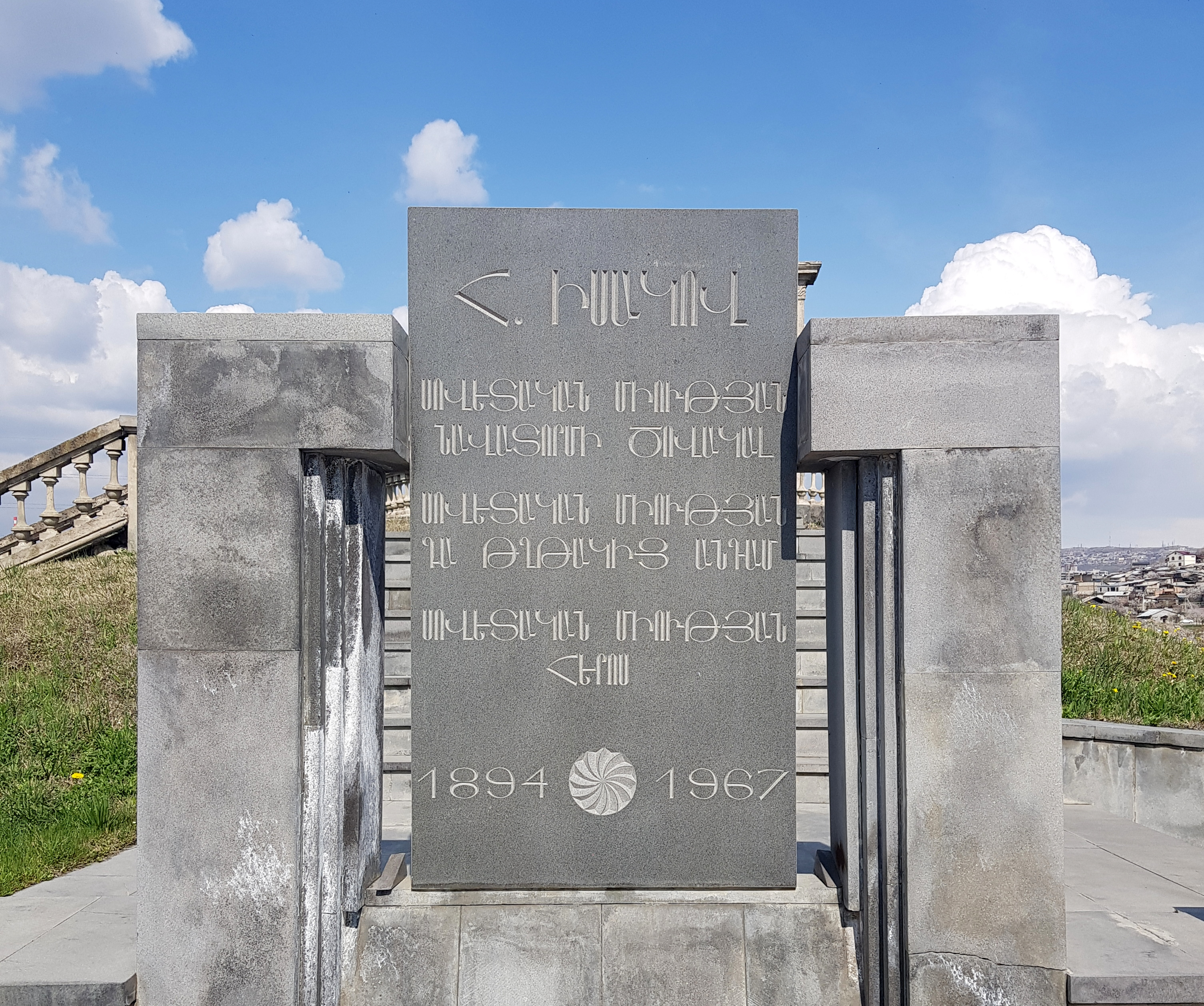

== Honours and awards ==
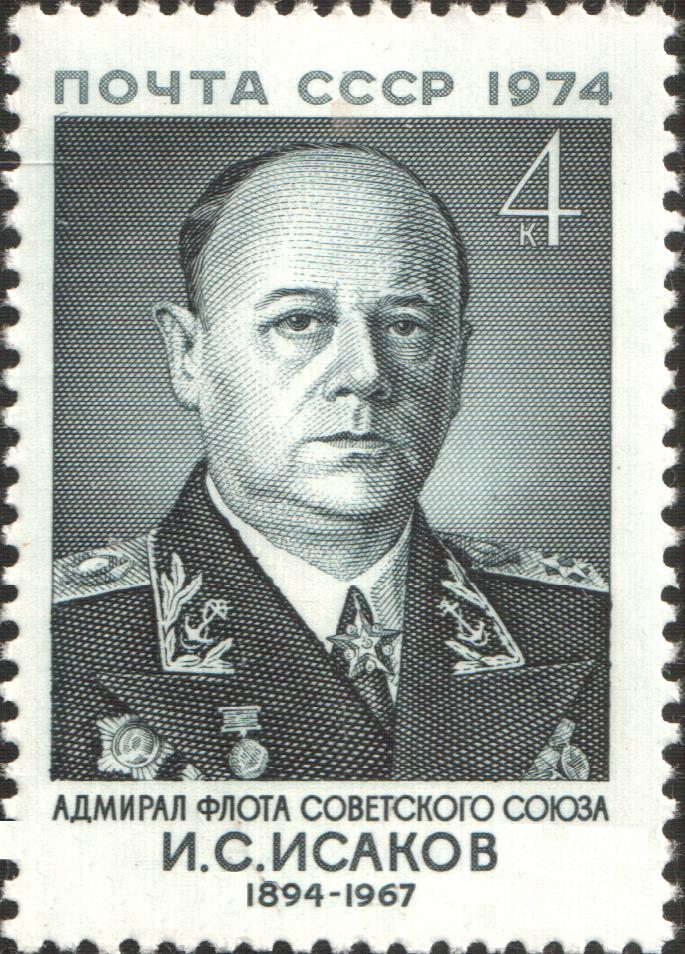
1974 Soviet stamp commemorating Isakov

Soviet Union

Hero of the Soviet Union (7 May 1965)
Six Orders of Lenin (22 February 1938, 13 December 1942, 21 February 1945, 21 August 1954, 21 August 1964, 7 May 1965)
Order of the Red Banner, three times (21 April 1940, 3 November 1944, 6 November 1947)
Two Orders of Ushakov, 1st class (22 July 1944, 28 June 1964)
Order of the Patriotic War, 1st class (22 February 1943)
Order of the Red Star (23 February 1934)
Medal "For the Defence of Leningrad" (22 December 1942)
Medal "For the Defence of Moscow" (1 May 1944)
Medal "For the Defence of Sevastopol" (22 December 1942)
Medal "For the Defence of the Caucasus" (1 May 1944)
Medal "For the Victory over Germany in the Great Patriotic War 1941–1945" (9 May 1945)
Medal "For the Victory over Japan" (30 September 1945)
Jubilee Medal "Twenty Years of Victory in the Great Patriotic War 1941–1945" (7 May 1965)
Jubilee Medal "XX Years of the Workers' and Peasants' Red Army" (24 January 1938)
Jubilee Medal "30 Years of the Soviet Army and Navy" (22 February 1948)
Jubilee Medal "40 Years of the Armed Forces of the USSR" (17 February 1958)
Medal "In Commemoration of the 800th Anniversary of Moscow" (20 September 1947)
Medal "In Commemoration of the 250th Anniversary of Leningrad" (16 May 1957)

- Wound stripe
- Stalin Prize (1950)

Foreign

Order of the Cross of Grunwald, 1st Class (Poland)
Order of National Liberation (Yugoslavia)
Order of the Partisan Star, 1st class, twice (Yugoslavia)

== Writings ==
Isakov had written several books, mainly about naval warfare:

- "Japanese Operations Again Tsingdao in 1914", 1936
- "USSR Naval Fleet in the Patriotic War", 1947
- "Stories About the Navy", 1962
- "The End of a Nine", 1963
- "The First Diplomatic Assignment", 1964
- "Story of an Indestructible Major", 1965
- "Naval Attractions", 1984
- "Selected Works", 1984
