= Anatoly Betekhtin =

Soviet general

Anatoly Vladimirovich Betekhin (Russian: Анатолий Владимирович Бетехин; September 20, 1931 – October 27, 2012) was a Soviet military commander and full general since 1988. He was born in the village of Argunovo, Nikolsky District, Vologda Oblast. He started his military career in 1950 and graduated from the Kiev Military college of Self-propelled artillery in 1953, the Military Academy of Armoured Forces in 1961, the General Staff Academy in 1972, and higher academic courses of General Staff Academy in 1980.

Betekhin became a full general of the Red Army. In June 1981 he was appointed as first deputy head and chief of staff of the Odessa Military District. In January 1984 he headed the Baltic Military District. In 1987 Betekhin became the commander of the Transbaikal Military District. From 1988 to 1992 he was the first deputy minister of the Soviet Land Forces.
