= Vladimir Chernavin =

Soviet admiral of the fleet (1928–2023)

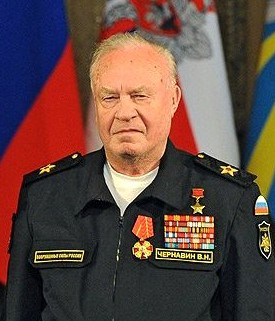
- Chernavin in 2013
- Born: 22 April 1928; Nikolayev, Ukrainian SSR, Soviet Union
- Died: 18 March 2023 (aged 94); Moscow, Russia
- Burial place: Federal Military Memorial Cemetery, Moscow Oblast
- Education: Baku Higher Naval School; Frunze Higher Naval School; Naval Academy; General Staff Academy
- Military career
- Allegiance: Soviet Union; Russia
- Branch: Soviet Navy; Russian Navy
- Service years: 1947–1993
- Rank: Admiral of the fleet
- Commands: Commander-in-Chief of the Soviet Navy; Northern Fleet; 3rd Submarine Flotilla; 19th Submarine Division; K-21; S-347
- Awards: Hero of the Soviet Union; Order of Lenin (2); Order of the October Revolution; Order of the Red Banner; Order of Alexander Nevsky

Admiral of the Fleet Vladimir Nikolayevich Chernavin (Note: Russian: Владимир Николаевич Чернавин) (22 April 1928 – 18 March 2023) was a Russian officer of the Soviet Navy. He was the last commander-in-chief of the Soviet Navy from 1985 to 1991 and the only commander-in-chief of the Commonwealth of Independent States Navy from 1991 to 1992.

Chernavin served a submarine officer in the Northern Fleet for over three decades and participated in the development of nuclear submarines. He commanded the November-class submarine K-21 and led it on the first patrol of the Arctic Sea by a Soviet nuclear submarine. Chernavin later commanded the 19th Submarine Division of Delta-class submarines and the 3rd Submarine Flotilla. From 1977 to 1981, he was commander of the Northern Fleet, and from 1981 to 1985 he was Chief of the Main Staff and First Deputy-Commander-in-Chief of the Navy. During his tenure as Commander-in-Chief the Soviet Navy was at the peak of its power, and had more than 200 ships deployed around the world at any time. After his retirement in 1993, was the president of the Union of Submariners until 2014.

== Early life ==
Vladimir Nikolayevich Chernavin was born in Nikolayev, Ukrainian Soviet Socialist Republic, Soviet Union, on 22 April 1928. His father Nikolai Vasilyevich (1895–1944) had been drafted in the Imperial Russian Navy in 1916, during World War I, and later fought on the Eastern Front of World War II. He served in the north and died from combat injuries while at a military hospital in 1944. From 1941 the younger Chernavin lived in Ulyanovsk after having been evacuated, and completed two courses there as a mechanic before entering the Higher Naval School in Baku, Azerbaijan Soviet Socialist Republic, in 1944. He was commissioned as a lieutenant upon graduation in 1947.

== Naval career ==
Immediately after being commissioned Chernavin attended the Frunze Higher Naval School in Leningrad until he graduated 1951. He was then assigned to the Northern Fleet submarine forces, where he served in several roles aboard the S-class submarine S-102 until 1953, including as its executive officer. Chernavin then attended the Higher Officer Classes of the 1st Submarine Higher Naval School, which he completed in 1954, and then executive officer aboard S-155. In February 1956 he was appointed commander of the Whiskey-class submarine S-347, and in the summer of 1958 the submarine traveled from Kola Bay during a month-long patrol to Iceland and the Faroe Islands.

In April 1959 Chernavin was designated commander of the November-class submarine K-21, which entered service in October 1961. In 1962 he led K-21 on the first patrol of the Arctic Sea by a Russia nuclear submarine. The patrol lasted 51 days and traversed a total distance of 10,124 miles, the majority of which were spent submerged. The crew maneuvered K-21 under the sea ice, and Captain 2nd rank Chernavin later led a commission that put together instructions for maneuvering a nuclear submarine under ice. From 1962 to 1965 he attended the Naval Academy, before serving as chief of staff of the 3rd Submarine Division of the Northern Fleet from July 1965. In February and March 1966 he commanded the global circumnavigation by submarines K-116 and K-133, which took place from the Barents Sea through the Atlantic, the Drake Passage, the Pacific, and ended in Kamchatka.

In February 1969 he became first commander of the newly formed 19th Submarine Division, consisting of Delta-class submarines, which belonged the second generation of Soviet nuclear submarines. From January to March 1971 he commanded the transfer of the K-408 from the Northern Fleet to the Pacific Fleet, via the Drake Passage. In February 1972, Rear Admiral Chernavin became chief of staff and first deputy commander of the 3rd Submarine Flotilla and a member of its military council. He was also on board K-245 when it went on patrol to the North Pole. In August 1973 he was made commander of the flotilla. After that, Chernavin served chief of staff and first deputy commander of the Northern Fleet from September 1974 to June 1977. During his tenure, in 1975, he was promoted to vice admiral.

During his tenure as commander of the Northern Fleet from July 1977 to December 1981, Northern Fleet nuclear submarines were routinely deployed to the South Atlantic and the Indian Ocean. The fleet took part in strategic exercises involving the Soviet Armed Forces, and in 1979 and 1980 it was recognized as being the best fleet in the Soviet Navy. In 1978 he was promoted to admiral. For his "great contribution in increasing the combat readiness of the forces of the Navy and capable management of them in the difficult conditions of the world's oceans, personal bravery, demonstrated in difficult ocean patrols" Chernavin was awarded the title Hero of the Soviet Union in February 1981. In December 1981 he was made the Chief of the Main Staff and First Deputy-Commander-in-Chief of the Navy, and was promoted to admiral of the fleet on 4 November 1983.

=== Navy Commander-in-Chief ===
On 29 November 1985 he was appointed Commander-in-Chief of the Soviet Navy and a deputy minister of defense. During his tenure the Soviet Navy was at the peak of its power, with 200 ships deployed in the world's oceans at any given time. Chernavin oversaw an operation code-named "Atrina" in March 1987, during which five nuclear submarines were positioned in the Western Atlantic to monitor American submarine activity, before returning to their base at the Kola Peninsula. After the dissolution of the Soviet Union, from February to August 1992 he was briefly the commander of the Commonwealth of Independent States Navy. Chernavin was then placed at the service of the Russian Minister of Defense before retiring in February 1993.

== Post-naval career ==
From 1993 to 1994 he was the head of the Russian State Naval Historical-Cultural Center, and from 1995 he was the main specialist of the Russian Navy. From 2008 he was the leading analyst in the Office of Inspectors General of the Ministry of Defense. He founded the Union of Submariners on 14 January 1992 and was its president from then until 2014. From 2014, he was its honorary president. Chernavin wrote multiple books, and since 2004 had been the organizer of the film festival "We are from the submarine fleet."

Chernavin died in Moscow on 18 March 2023, at the age of 94. He was buried with military honours at the Federal Military Memorial Cemetery's Pantheon of Defenders of the Fatherland on 21 March 2023.

== Honours and awards ==
His awards include:

- Hero of the Soviet Union (1981)
- Order of Lenin (1971 and 1981)
- Order of the October Revolution (1976)
- Order of the Red Banner (1966)
- Order of Alexander Nevsky (2013)
- Order of the Red Star (1988)
- Order of Courage (1997)
- Order of Naval Merit (2008)

== Notes ==
Military offices
Preceded by Georgy Yegorov	Commander of the Northern Fleet; 1977–1981	Succeeded by Arkady Mikhailovsky
Preceded by Georgy Yegorov	Chief of the Main Staff and First Deputy Commander-in-Chief of the Soviet Navy; 1981–1985	Succeeded by Konstantin Makarov
Preceded by Sergey Gorshkov	Commander-in-Chief of the Soviet Navy; 1985–1992	Succeeded by Feliks Gromov as Commander-in-Chief of the Russian Navy
