= Sergey Gorshkov =

Soviet admiral of the fleet (1910–1988)

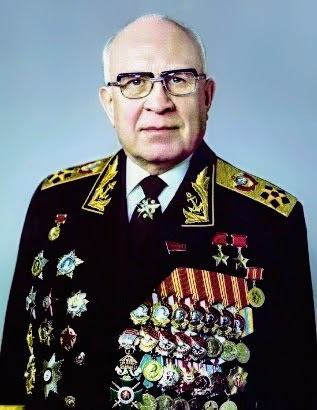
- Gorshkov between 1982 and 1983

Commander-in-Chief of the Soviet Navy
- In office 5 January 1956 – 9 December 1985
- Preceded by: Nikolai Kuznetsov
- Succeeded by: Vladimir Chernavin

Personal details
- Born: 26 February 1910 Kamianets-Podilskyi, Russian Empire (modern-day Ukraine)
- Died: 13 May 1988 (aged 78) Moscow, Russian SFSR, Soviet Union
- Awards: Hero of the Soviet Union (twice)

Military service
- Allegiance: Soviet Union
- Branch/service: Soviet Navy
- Years of service: 1927–1985
- Rank: Admiral of the Fleet of the Soviet Union
- Commands: Azov Flotilla; Danube Flotilla; Black Sea Fleet; Soviet Navy
- Battles/wars: Battle of Lake Khasan; World War II

Sergey Georgyevich Gorshkov (Russian: Серге́й Гео́ргиевич Горшко́в; 26 February 1910 – 13 May 1988) was an admiral of the fleet of the Soviet Union. Twice awarded the title Hero of the Soviet Union, Gorshkov oversaw the expansion of the Soviet Navy into a vast force capable of global-scale operations during the Cold War, during his 29-year tenure as its Commander-in-Chief from 1956 to 1985.

== Early life and prewar service ==
Born in Kamianets-Podilskyi to a Russian family, Gorshkov grew up in Kolomna. After joining the Soviet Navy in 1927, he entered the M.V. Frunze Naval School in Leningrad during October of that year. Gorshkov began his service with the Black Sea Fleet (then known as the Black Sea Naval Forces) upon graduation in November 1931 as a watch officer aboard the destroyer Frunze. He quickly became its navigator a month later and in March 1932 transferred to the Pacific Fleet to serve in the same position aboard the minelayer Tomsk. Promoted to become flagship navigator of the minelaying and minesweeping brigade of the fleet in January 1934, Gorshkov was given command of the Uragan-class guard ship Buran in November of that year. He studied at courses for destroyer commanders between December 1936 and March 1937, becoming commander of the destroyer Razyashchy following completion. After becoming chief of staff of the Pacific Fleet Destroyer Brigade in October, Gorshkov was appointed its commander in May 1938. During this period he participated in the Battle of Lake Khasan before being transferred west to command the Black Sea Fleet Cruiser Brigade in June 1940.

== World War II ==
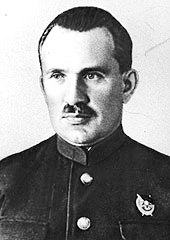
Gorshkov during World War II

From the first days after the beginning of Operation Barbarossa, the German invasion of the Soviet Union, Gorshkov's destroyer brigade participated in the Black Sea Fleet's operations. Gorshkov was promoted to rear admiral on 16 September. During the Siege of Odessa, Gorshkov led a landing in the area of Grigorievka before taking command of the Azov Flotilla in October. In late December and early January 1942 he commanded the landings on the north coast of the Kerch Peninsula. In August, Gorshkov commanded 150 warships of the flotilla in a breakout from the Sea of Azov to the Black Sea after the withdrawal of Soviet troops to Novorossiysk. After the resulting disbandment of the flotilla, he became deputy commander of naval forces and a member of the military council of the Novorossiysk Defense District. Gorshkov temporarily commanded the troops of the 47th Army defending the region in November during the Battle of the Caucasus.

After taking command of the reformed Azov Flotilla in February 1943, he led the unit during landings at Taganrog, Mariupol, and Osipenko, before supporting the troops of the North Caucasian Front in the capture of the Taman Peninsula. During the November 1943 Kerch–Eltigen Operation, Gorshkov personally supervised the preparations and the landing of troops for the main attack. For his leadership of amphibious operations, he was awarded the Order of Kutuzov, 1st class, while receiving the Order of Ushakov, 2nd class, for his command of the flotilla during the recapture of Crimea.

After being made commander of the Danube Flotilla in April 1944, Gorshkov led the unit during the August Jassy–Kishinev Offensive, supporting the troops of the 3rd Ukrainian Front in the crossing of the Dniester and the entry into the Danube Delta. Between September and November, the flotilla went on to support the troops of the 2nd and 3rd Ukrainian Fronts during the Belgrade and Budapest Offensives. Gorshkov was promoted to vice admiral in September 1944 and was transferred in December to command the Black Sea Fleet squadron, ending the war in that position. He was mentioned seven times in the orders of Joseph Stalin in the latter's capacity of Supreme Commander of the Soviet Armed Forces.

== Cold War ==
Following the end of the war, Gorshkov continued to command the squadron until becoming Chief of Staff of the Black Sea Fleet in November 1948. He became the commander of the fleet in August 1951 and was promoted to admiral on 3 August 1953. Following his July 1955 appointment as First Deputy Commander-in-Chief of the Soviet Navy, Nikita Khrushchev made him Commander-in-Chief of the Soviet Navy in January 1956, succeeding Nikolai Kuznetsov. As Commander-in-Chief of the Soviet Navy, Gorshkov simultaneously served as a Deputy Minister of Defense of the Soviet Union, receiving the rank of admiral of the fleet on 24 April 1962. Under Leonid Brezhnev, Gorshkov oversaw a massive naval build-up of surface and submarine forces, creating a force capable of challenging Western naval power by the late 1970s. This included the adoption of nuclear weapons, which were carried by ballistic missile submarines and aircraft, as well as the development of nuclear submarines and shipboard helicopters. In order to project Soviet military power, Gorshkov sent ships on lengthy cruises and formed operational squadrons in the Mediterranean Sea and the Atlantic, Pacific, and Indian Oceans, building a blue-water navy. He received the title Hero of the Soviet Union on 7 May 1965 and was promoted to admiral of the fleet of the Soviet Union – the highest Soviet naval rank – on 22 October 1967.

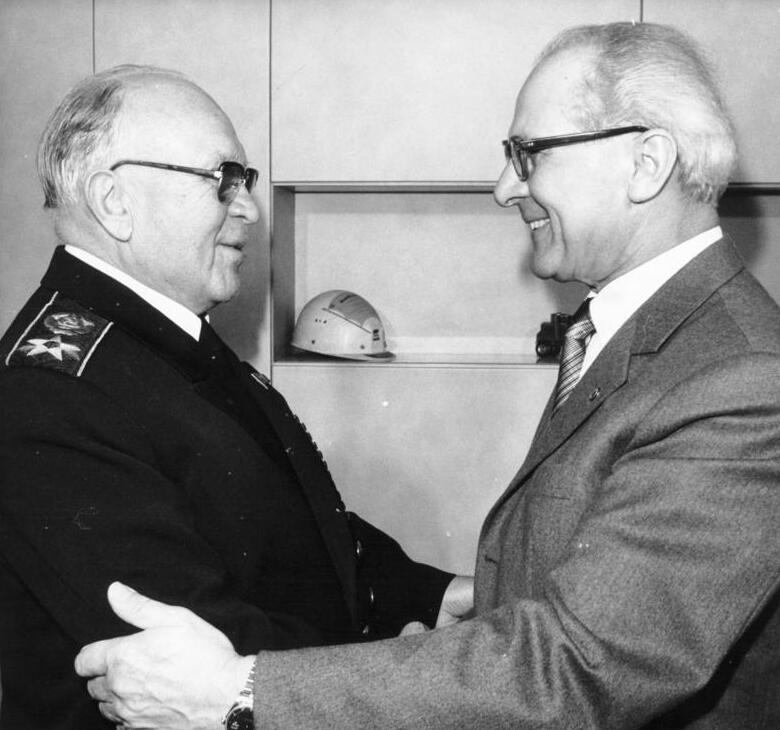
Gorshkov meeting East German leader Erich Honecker, 1980

Gorshkov was again awarded the title Hero of the Soviet Union on 21 December 1982. Transferred to the Group of Inspectors General of the Ministry of Defense in December 1985, a retirement post for elderly senior officers, he was succeeded by Vladimir Chernavin. Gorshkov died in Moscow on 13 May 1988. He was buried in the Novodevichy Cemetery.

Gorshkov is often associated with the phrase "'Better' is the enemy of 'Good Enough'" ("Лучшее - враг хорошего") which is reputed to have hung on the wall of his office as a motto. Similar sentiments have been attributed to Clausewitz and Voltaire. The motto appears in the Tom Clancy novel, The Hunt for Red October. The phrase is also attributed to Admiral Gorshkov in Norman Polmar's Guide to the Soviet Navy (1983, 3rd edition).

== Awards, honours and decorations ==
Soviet awards

- Hero of the Soviet Union, twice (1965 and 1982)
- Order of Lenin - 7 times (1953, 1960, 1963, 1965, 1970, 1978, 1982)
- Order of the October Revolution (1968)
- Order of the Red Banner, four times (1942, 1943, 1947, 1959)
- Order of Ushakov, 1st and 2nd classes
- Order of Kutuzov
- Order of the Patriotic War, 1st class (1985)
- Order of the Red Star
- Order for Service to the Homeland in the Armed Forces of the USSR, 3rd class (1975)
- USSR State Prize (1980)
- Lenin Prize (1985)
- Honorary Citizen of Sevastopol, Vladivostok, Berdyansk, Eisk and Severodvinsk
- campaign and jubilee medals
- Honorary Weapon (1968)

Gorshkov has been commemorated by various monuments and namesakes:

- Monuments in Kolomna (sculpted by Lev Kerbel) and Novorossiysk
- Memorial plaque on the Russian Navy Headquarters building in Moscow
- Memorial plaque on the headquarters building of the Black Sea Fleet
- Central Hospital of the Navy
- School number 9 in Kolomna, from which he graduated in 1926, street and school in the district
- Streets and a gymnasium in Kupavna microdistrict, Balashikha, Moscow Oblast
- A lyceum and a microdistrict in Novorossiysk
- Central Sports Club of the Navy
- The Admiral Gorshkov Medal (Russian Navy, 2006)
- A Kiev-class aircraft carrier (Admiral Gorshkov, renamed INS Vikramaditya after sale to India)
- Russian frigate Admiral Gorshkov, the lead ship of her class

Foreign awards

- Gold Patriotic Order of Merit (East Germany)
- Scharnhorst Order (East Germany)
- Gold Order of the Partisan Star (Yugoslavia)
- Order of Sukhbaatar (Mongolia)
- Order of the Hungarian People's Republic, 1st class (Hungary)
- Order of the People's Republic of Bulgaria, 1st class (Bulgaria)
- Grand Cross of the Order of St. Alexander, with swords (Bulgaria)

Military offices
Preceded by Nikolay Gerasimovich Kuznetsov	Commander-in-Chief of the Soviet Navy; 1956-1985	Succeeded by Vladimir Nikolayevich Chernavin
