= Semyon Lobov (admiral) =

Soviet admiral (1913–1977)

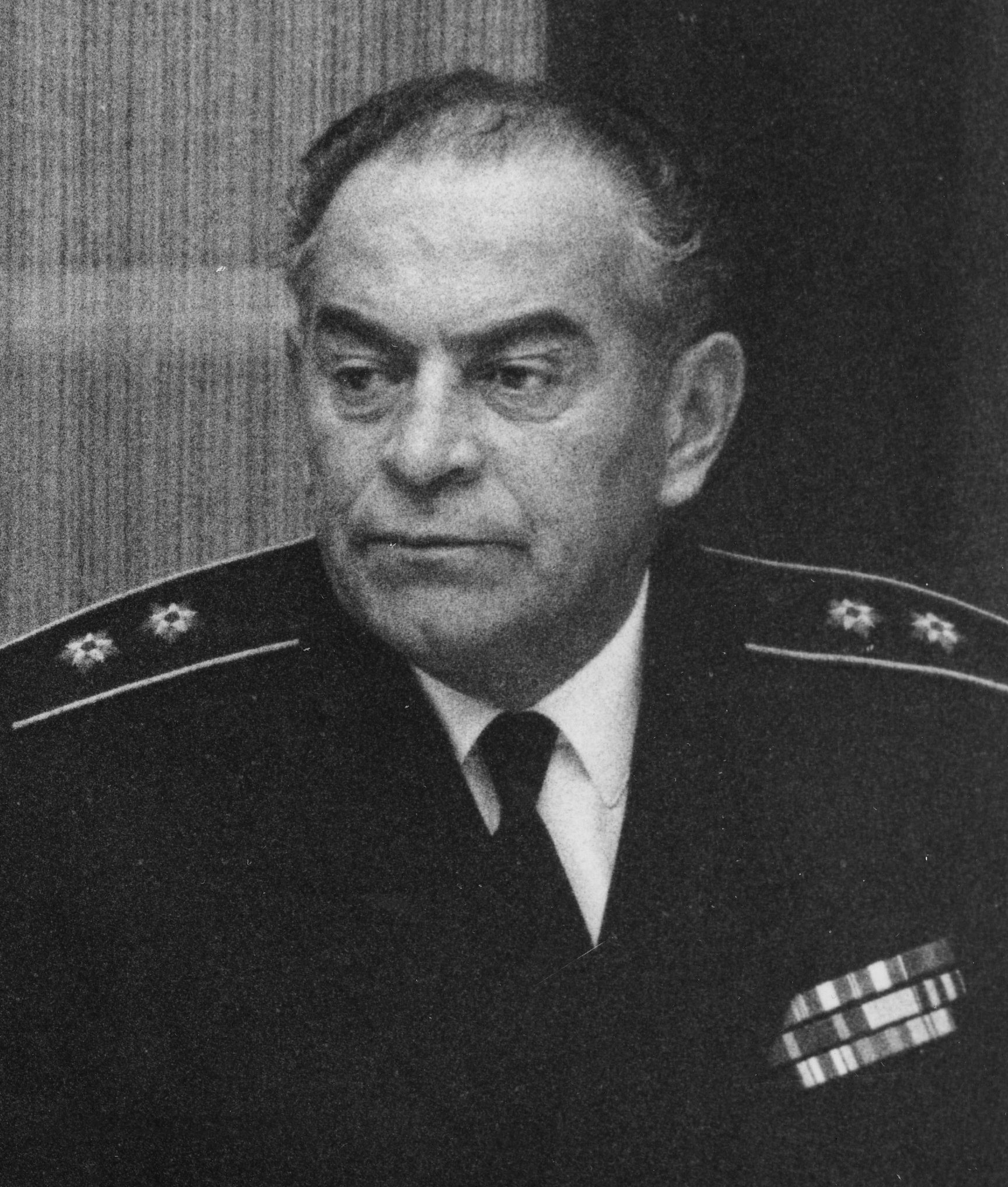
- Lobov in 1964
- Native name: Семён Михайлович Лобов
- Born: 15 February 1913; Smolnikovo, Moscow Governorate, Russian Empire
- Died: 12 July 1977 (aged 64) Moscow, Soviet Union
- Buried: Novodevichy Cemetery
- Allegiance: Soviet Union
- Branch: Soviet Navy
- Service years: 1932-1977
- Rank: Fleet Admiral
- Commands: Northern Fleet
- Conflicts: World War II
- Awards: Order of Lenin (twice)

Semyon Mikhailovich Lobov (Russian: Семён Михайлович Лобов; 15 February 1913 – 12 July 1977) was a Fleet Admiral in the Soviet Navy.

Lobov was born in Smolnikovo, Volokolamsky District, Moscow Oblast and joined the Soviet Navy in 1932. In 1937 Lobov completed the M.V. Frunze Higher Naval School and served in the Soviet Pacific Fleet. Between 1938 and 1946 he commanded an escort ship and a destroyer. In 1945 he took part in the Soviet war against Japan.

In 1946 Lobov transferred to the Black Sea Fleet where he commanded the Kirov-class cruiser Voroshilov. In 1951 he commanded the battleship Sevastopol. In 1954 Lobov transferred to the Soviet Northern Fleet where he became a squadron commander and in 1964 he became Commander of the Northern Fleet.

In 1972 Lobov was deputy chief of staff of the Soviet Navy and became a candidate member of the Central Committee of the Communist Party. He was also a deputy in the Supreme Soviet.

Lobov is buried in the Novodevichy Cemetery in Moscow.

The fourth, incomplete and uncommissioned, Slava-class cruiser Admiral Flota Lobov was named after him.

== Awards and decorations ==
- Order of Lenin - twice
- Order of the October Revolution
- Order of the Red Banner - twice
- Order of the Red Star - twice
