= Admiral of the fleet (Soviet Union) =

Admiral of the fleet Адмирал флота Admiral flota
- Marshal's star (small version)

- Shoulder strap (1955–1990)
- Country: USSR
- Service branch: Soviet Navy
- Rank group: General officer
- Formation: 1940 1st 1962 2nd
- Abolished: March 1955 1st 1991 2nd
- Next higher rank: Admiral of the fleet of the Soviet Union
- Next lower rank: Admiral
- Equivalent ranks: General of the army

The rank of admiral of the fleet or fleet admiral (Note: A literal translation of the Russian "адмирал флота" would be "admiral of the fleet" (адмирал — "admiral", nominative singular, флота — "of the fleet", genitive singular of флот, "fleet"). This equates in meaning and form with the Commonwealth rank "admiral of the fleet", but equally well to the rank "fleet admiral". Either translation is acceptable.) (Russian: адмирал флота, romanized: admiral flota) was the highest naval rank of the Soviet Union from 1940 to 1955 and second-highest from 1962 to 1991.

It was first created by a decree of the Presidium of the Supreme Soviet in 1940 as an equivalent to general of the army, but it was not used until 1944, when Ivan Isakov and Nikolai Kuznetsov were promoted to the rank.

The rank was abolished on 3 March 1955 with the establishment of the rank of admiral of the fleet of the Soviet Union. It was restored in 1962 as the second-highest navy rank.

The rank has been retained by the Russian Federation after 1991.

== Insignia ==
The first insignia was only sleeve insignia. In February 1943, traditional Russian ranks were reintroduced and the sleeve insignia was changed and shoulder straps were added with four "Nakhimov stars". In 1945, the stars were replaced with a single, bigger star to look similar to marshal's shoulder boards.

Use
Insignia
1940–1943

1943–1945
1945–1955
1962–1974
1974–1991

== Officers promoted to admiral of the fleet ==
Portrait	Name (Birth–Death)	Promoted	Retired	Ref.
	Ivan Isakov (1894–1967)	31 May 1944	11 October 1967 †	
	Nikolai Kuznetsov (1904–1974)	31 May 1944	17 February 1956	
	Sergey Gorshkov (1910–1988)	28 April 1962	13 May 1988	
	Vladimir Kasatonov (1910–1989)	18 July 1965	9 June 1989	
	Nikolai Sergeyev (1909–1999)	30 April 1970	11 January 1992	
	Semyon Lobov (1913–1977)	28 July 1970	12 July 1977 †	
	Georgy Yegorov (1918–2008)	5 November 1973	May 1992	
	Nikolay Ivanovich Smirnov (1917–1992)	5 November 1973	11 January 1992	
	Vladimir Chernavin (1928–2023)	4 November 1983	11 January 1992	
	Alexey Sorokin (1922–2020)	16 February 1988	May 1992	
	Ivan Kapitanets (1928–2018)	4 November 1989	11 January 1992	
	Konstantin Makarov (1931–2011)	4 November 1989	12 September 1992	

== See also ==
- Ranks and rank insignia of the Soviet Army 1943–1955, and ... 1955–1991
- Army General (Soviet rank)
- Admiral of the fleet (Russia)
- Admiral of the fleet
