= Army General (Soviet rank) =

Military Rank

Army general генерал армии general armii
- Small marshal's star

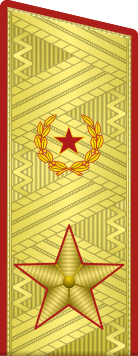
- Uniform shoulder board (1974—1991)
- Country: Soviet Union
- Service branch: Army
- Formation: June 1940
- Abolished: December 1991
- Next higher rank: Marshal of the Soviet Union
- Next lower rank: Colonel general
- Equivalent ranks: Marshal of the branch Admiral of the fleet

Army general (Russian: генерал армии, romanized: general armii) was a rank of the Soviet Union which was first established in June 1940 as a high rank for Red Army generals, inferior only to the marshal of the Soviet Union. In the following 51 years the Soviet Union created 133 generals of the army, 32 of whom were later promoted to the rank of marshal of the Soviet Union. It is a direct counterpart of the Russian Federation's "Army general" rank.

== Promotion ==
The rank was usually given to senior officers of the Ministry of Defence and General Staff, and also to meritorious military district commanders. From the 1970s, it was also frequently given to the heads of the KGB and the Ministry of the Interior.

Soviet army generals include Ivan Chernyakhovsky (the youngest Soviet World War II front commander, killed in East Prussia), Aleksei Antonov (head of the General Staff in the closing stages of World War II, awarded the Order of Victory), Issa Pliyev (an Ossetian-born World War II commander who played a major role in the Cuban Missile Crisis) and Yuri Andropov (who held the rank as head of the KGB).

The Soviet rank of army general is equivalent to the UK and US ranks of general; Soviet and current Russian rank systems also have a marshal rank.

The corresponding naval rank is fleet admiral, which has been used in both the Soviet and Russian navies, although conferred much more rarely.

Army general was used for the infantry and marines, but in the air force, artillery, armoured troops, engineer troops and signal troops the ranks of marshal of the branch and chief marshal of the branch were used.

== Versions of rank insignia ==
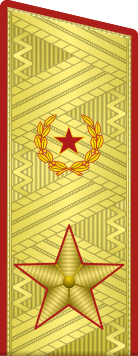
Звание	USSR Red Army		Soviet Army / Soviet Armed Forces
Gorget patch chevron shoulder board
	Komandarm 1st rank (1935—1940)	gorget patch everyday uniform (1940—1943)	shoulder board field uniform (1943—1955)	... dress (1943—1955)	... dress (1955—1974)	... dress (1974—1991)

== See also ==
- Russian military ranks
- Fleet Admiral (Soviet rank)
- Army general (Russia)
- Ranks and insignia of the Soviet Armed Forces 1943–1955, and 1955–1991
- Ranks and insignia of the Russian Federation's armed forces 1994–2010
