= Ivan Kapitanets =

Admiral of the Fleet Ivan Kapitanets
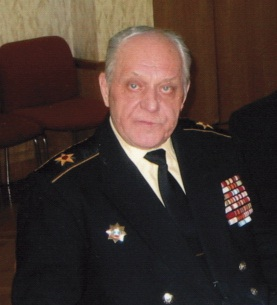
- Born: January 10, 1928; North Caucasus Krai, Russian SFSR, Soviet Union
- Died: September 25, 2018 (aged 90) Moscow, Russia
- Allegiance: Soviet Union
- Branch: Soviet Navy
- Service years: 1941–1992
- Rank: Admiral of the fleet
- Commands: Baltic Fleet; Northern Fleet

Ivan Matveyevich Kapitanets (Russian: Ива́н Матве́евич Капита́нец; 10 January 1928 – 25 September 2018) was a Soviet Navy admiral of the fleet who held two senior commands in the 1980s, the Baltic Fleet and the Northern Fleet.

== Early life and education ==
Kapitanets entered the Navy in 1946 and graduated from the Caspian Higher Naval School in 1950.

== Naval career ==
After graduation he joined the Northern Fleet and served as torpedo officer on the destroyer Okrylenny. He completed the Higher Special Officer Classes of the Navy in 1958 and commanded the destroyers Ostry and Otryvisty of the Northern Fleet.

After completing the Naval Academy in 1961 he commanded a destroyer squadron of the Northern Fleet. Kapitanets graduated from the General Staff Academy in 1970 and was deputy commander of the 5th Operational Squadron (the Soviet Mediterranean squadron) between 1970 and 1973.

In 1973 Kapitanets was assigned to the Pacific Fleet and commanded the Kamchatka Flotilla. He was promoted to vice admiral in 1975.

Kapitanets was deputy commander of the Baltic Fleet in 1978 and commanded this fleet in 1981-85 when he was promoted to commander of the Northern Fleet. Kapitanets was made first deputy commander of the Soviet Navy and Fleet Admiral in 1988. He retired in 1992.

In retirement Kapitanets consulted for the Russian Government on naval matters and was a member of the Academy of Military Sciences. He was also the author of several books on Russian naval history.

== Honours and awards ==
- Order of Courage
- Order of Lenin
- Order of Nakhimov, 1st class
- Order of the Red Star
- Order for Service to the Homeland in the Armed Forces of the USSR, 3rd class

Military offices
Preceded by Vladimir Sidorov	Commander of the Baltic Fleet; 1981–1985	Succeeded by Konstantin Makarov
Preceded by Arkady Mikhaylovsky	Commander of the Northern Fleet; 1985–1988	Succeeded by Feliks Gromov
