= Alexey Sorokin (admiral) =

Soviet admiral (1922–2020)

Admiral of the Fleet Alexey Sorokin
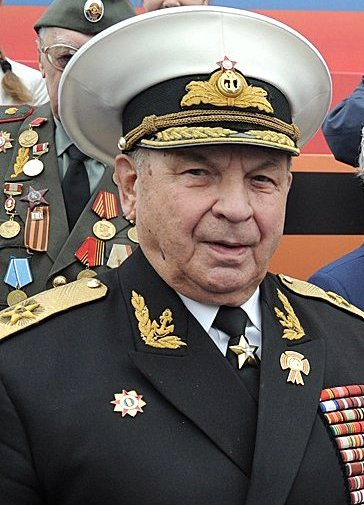
- Born: 28 March 1922; Kirillovka, Nizhny Novgorod Governorate, Russian SFSR
- Died: 4 March 2020 (aged 97) Moscow, Russia
- Buried: Federal Military Memorial Cemetery
- Allegiance: Soviet Union
- Branch: Soviet Navy
- Service years: 1941–1992
- Rank: Admiral of the fleet
- Conflicts: World War II
- Awards: Order of Lenin; Order of the October Revolution; Order of the Red Banner of Labour; Medal of Zhukov

Alexey Ivanovich Sorokin (Russian: Алексе́й Ива́нович Соро́кин; 28 March 1922 – 4 March 2020) was a Soviet Fleet Admiral and member of the Congress of People's Deputies of the Soviet Union.

== Biography ==
Sorokin was born one of five children. His father, a veteran invalid of the Russian Civil War, died in 1933 and his brother, Serafim, was reported as missing in action at the front near Moscow in March 1942. Sorokin joined the Red Army in 1941 and served as a mortar operator. He was promoted to lieutenant, commanding a mortar battery and fought during the liberation of Belarus and with the Baltic Front.

After the war, Sorokin served as a political officer and studied at the Lenin Military-Political Academy between 1948 and 1952. After graduating Sorokin was posted to the Navy and served as a political officer on the destroyers Redky and Vdumchevy of the Soviet Pacific Fleet. In 1954 he became political officer aboard the cruiser Kalinin. In 1956 he became political officer of the Pacific Fleet destroyer squadron and in 1959 he became base political officer at Sovetskaya Gavan.

Sorokin became chief political officer of the Northern Fleet in 1974 and was promoted to vice admiral in 1975. He became chief political officer of the Soviet Navy in 1980 and deputy chief political officer of the Soviet armed forces in 1981. He was promoted to Fleet Admiral in 1988 and retired in 1992.

Sorokin served as a People's Deputy in the Congress of People's Deputies of the Soviet Union in 1989–91. In retirement he lived in Moscow and was president of the International Union of CIS War Veterans (Pensioners) Associations.

Sorokin died on 4 March 2020, at the age of 97. He was buried in the Federal Military Memorial Cemetery on 6 March.

== Awards and honours ==
- Order of Honour (24 February 2012)
- Order of the Badge of Honour
- Order of Lenin
- Order of the October Revolution
- Two Orders of the Patriotic War, 1st class (3 September 1944; 11 March 1985)
- Order of the Patriotic War, 2nd class (23 January 1944)
- Order of the Red Banner of Labour (31 October 1967)
- Two Orders of the Red Star (29 November 1943; 30 December 1956)
- Order "For Service to the Homeland in the Armed Forces of the USSR", 3rd class (30 April 1975)
- Jubilee Medal "In Commemoration of the 100th Anniversary of the Birth of Vladimir Ilyich Lenin"
- Medal "For Battle Merit"
- Medal "For Distinction in Guarding the State Border of the USSR"
- Medal "For Strengthening of Brotherhood in Arms"
- Medal "For the Victory over Germany in the Great Patriotic War 1941–1945"
- Medal of Zhukov
