= Georgy Yegorov =

Soviet Naval Officer

Georgy Mikhailovich Yegorov
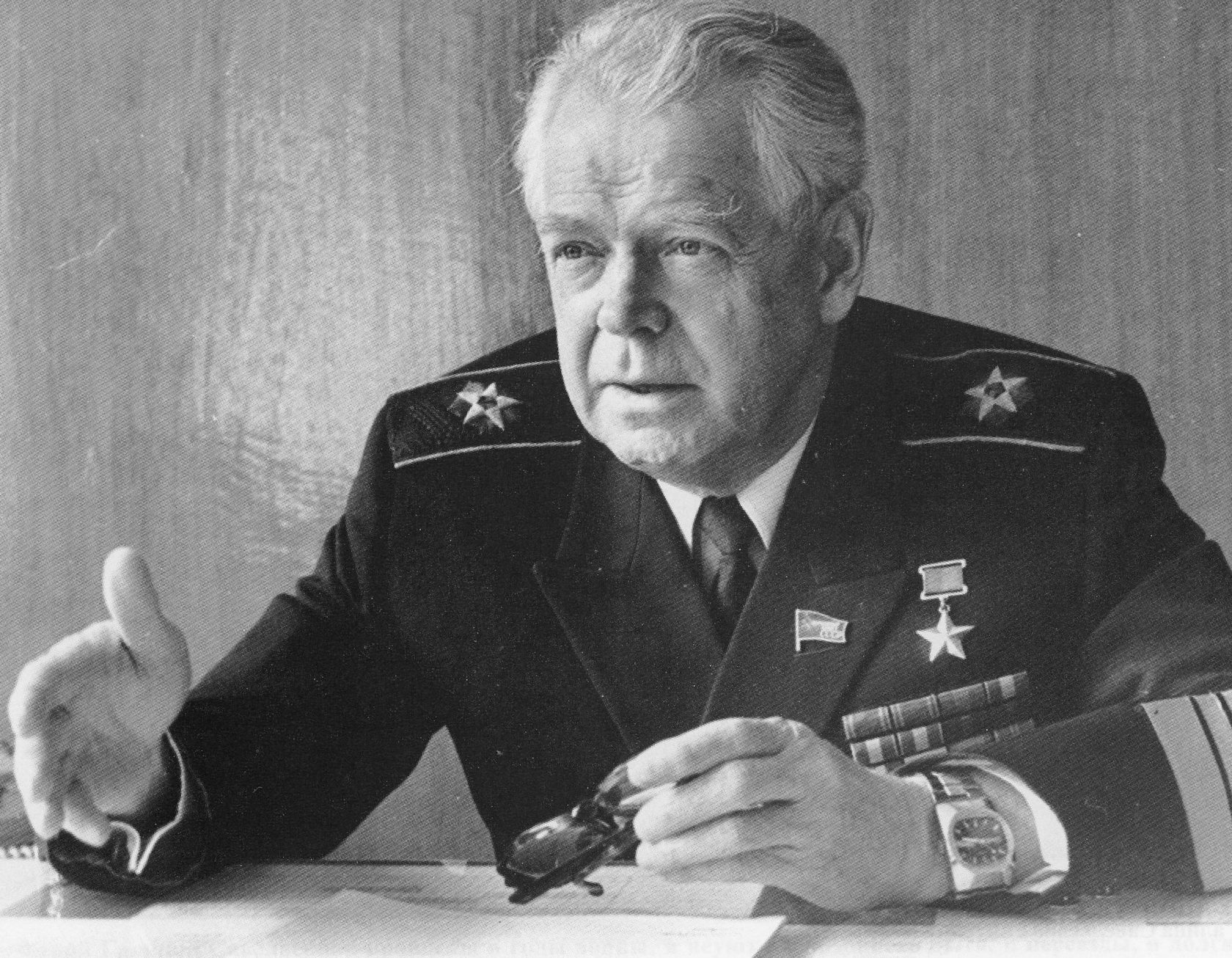
- Born: October 30, 1918; Volosovskiy District, Russian SFSR
- Died: February 9, 2008 (aged 89) Moscow, Russia
- Allegiance: Soviet Union
- Branch: Soviet Navy
- Service years: 1936–1992
- Rank: Fleet Admiral
- Commands: Northern Fleet
- Conflicts: World War II
- Awards: Hero of the Soviet Union

Georgy Mikhailovich Yegorov (Russian: Гео́ргий Миха́йлович Его́ров; 30 October 1918 – 9 February 2008) was a Soviet Fleet Admiral and Hero of the Soviet Union.

== Biography ==
Yegorov was born in a peasant family and graduated from the Frunze Higher Naval School in 1936. At the start of Operation Barbarossa, Yegorov was a Senior Lieutenant and navigating officer of a Shchuka-class submarine, SCH-310. In 1942 this submarine managed to break through into the central Baltic from its base in Leningrad and sink a German transport ship. On returning to base the boat hit a mine and grounded 60 metres (197 ft) underwater. Yegorov managed to refloat the submarine and return her safely to port. In 1944 he commanded the Soviet M-class submarine, M90 in which he completed four war patrols.

After the war Yegorov commanded the submarine divisions of the Northern and Pacific Fleets. In 1963 he became chief of staff of the Northern Fleet and he was deputy fleet commander between 1972 and 1977. In 1977 he became Chief of Staff/First Deputy Commander-in-Chief of the Soviet Navy.

Yegorov retired in 1992 and died in February 2008.

== Honours and awards ==
- "Gold Star" Medal Hero of the Soviet Union number 11304 (1978)
- Order of Lenin, twice
- Order of the October Revolution
- Order of the Red Banner, three times
- Order of the Patriotic War, 1st class, three times
- Order of the Red Star
- Jubilee Medal "In Commemoration of the 100th Anniversary of the Birth of Vladimir Ilyich Lenin"
