= Nikolay Smirnov (admiral) =

Soviet admiral (1917–1992)

Nikolay Ivanovich Smirnov
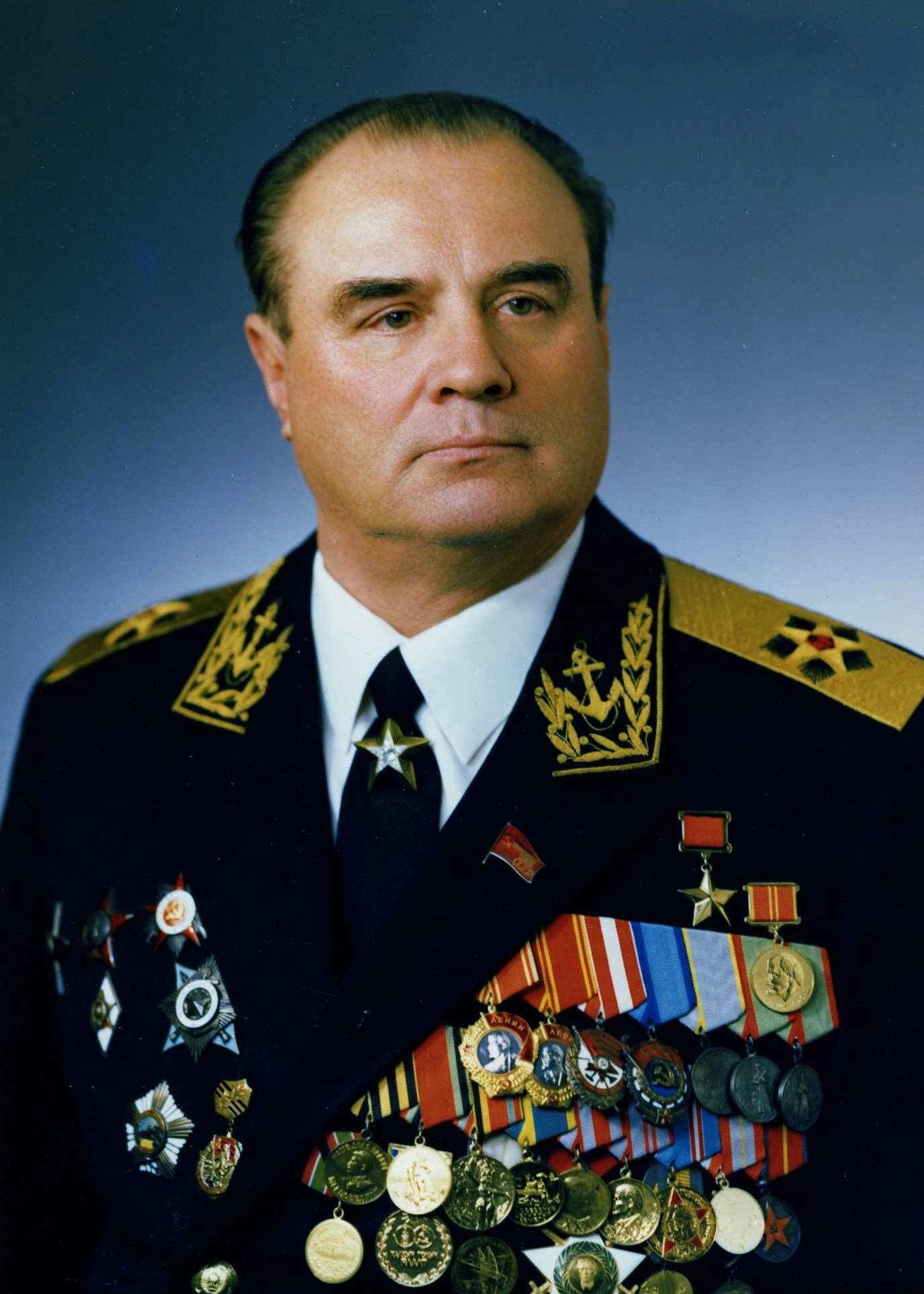
- Born: 5 October 1917; Robtsovo, Kostroma Governorate, Russian Republic
- Died: 8 July 1992 (aged 74) Moscow, Russia
- Allegiance: Soviet Union
- Branch: Soviet Navy
- Service years: 1937–1992
- Rank: Fleet Admiral
- Commands: Soviet Pacific Fleet
- Conflicts: World War II

Nikolay Ivanovich Smirnov (Russian: Николай Иванович Смирнов; 5 October 1917 – 8 July 1992) was a Soviet Navy Fleet Admiral and a Hero of the Soviet Union (1984).

== Biography ==
Smirnov was born in a peasant family and graduated from an agricultural institute. He joined the Navy in 1937 and completed the M.V. Frunze Higher Naval School in Leningrad in 1939. He joined the Pacific Fleet and qualified as a navigator on submarines. In 1943–44 he commanded a Pacific Fleet submarine. In June 1944 he was transferred to the Black Sea Fleet where he commanded a submarine.

After the war Smirnov continued in the Black Sea Fleet serving as a staff officer and commander of a submarine squadron in 1956–57. Smirnov graduated from the General Staff Academy in 1959. In 1960 he became chief of staff of the Black Sea Fleet. From 1964 to 1969 he was head of the Operational Directorate and Deputy Chief of the Main Navy Staff.

Smirnov became Pacific Fleet Commander in 1969 and First Deputy Commander-in-Chief of the Soviet Navy in 1974 having been promoted to Fleet Admiral in 1973.

Smirnov was part of the Inspectorate general of the Armed forces from March 1988. Smirnov died in 1992 and is buried in Novodevichy Cemetery, Moscow.

== Awards and honors ==
- Hero of the Soviet Union (17 February 1984)
- Two Orders of Lenin (1977, 1984)
- Order of the Red Banner (1958)
- Order of the Patriotic War, 1st class (1985)
- Order of the Patriotic War, 2nd class (1945)
- Two Orders of the Red Star (1953, 1966)
- Order "For Service to the Homeland in the Armed Forces of the USSR", 3rd class (1975)
- Order "For Military Merit" (Mongolian People's Republic, 1971)
- Order of 9 September 1944, 1st class with Swords (People's Republic of Bulgaria, 1974)
