= Konstantin Makarov =

Soviet admiral (1931–2011)

Admiral of the Fleet Konstantin Makarov
- Born: 18 June 1931; Tikhoretsk, North Caucasus Krai, Russian SFSR, Soviet Union
- Died: 3 August 2011 (aged 80) Moscow, Russia
- Allegiance: Soviet Union
- Branch: Soviet Navy
- Service years: 1949–1992
- Rank: Fleet Admiral
- Commands: Baltic Fleet
- Awards: Order of Lenin; Order of the October Revolution; Order of the Red Banner; Order of the Red Star - twice

Konstantin Valentinovich Makarov (Russian: Константи́н Валенти́нович Мака́ров, 18 June 1931 – 3 August 2011) was a Soviet Navy admiral of the fleet who served as the Chief of the Main Staff and First Deputy Commander-in-Chief of the Navy from 1985 to 1992.

== Biography ==
Makarov enlisted in the Soviet Navy in 1949 at the age of 18. He served aboard diesel submarines in the Black Sea Fleet, and was appointed commanding officer of a diesel submarine in 1963. He finished the Naval Academy in 1967 and was appointed commanding officer of a nuclear submarine. In a few years' time, Makarov was promoted to Chief of Staff of a division of nuclear submarines in the Northern Fleet. Makarov would continue to rise through the ranks of Soviet navies, having obtained roles such as Deputy Head, 1st Deputy Commander of the Baltic Fleet (eventually becoming the commander of the Baltic Fleet), the Chief of the Main Navy Staff, and finally was promoted to Fleet Admiral in 1989. He retired from the navy in 1992, and died in 2011.

Military offices
Preceded by Ivan Kapitanets	Commander of the Baltic Fleet; 1985	Succeeded by Vitaly Ivanov
Preceded by Vladimir Chernavin	Chief of the Main Staff and First Deputy Commander-in-Chief of the Soviet Navy; 1985–1992	Succeeded by Valentin Selivanov in the Russian Navy
