= Uniforms and insignia of the Red Army (1917–1922) =

In its nascent years, the Red Army's uniform was defined by two main factors: the revolutionary symbology developed in 1917 and the abysmal logistical realities of a country in crisis. This typically meant soldiers marching to Civil War battles in shabby World War hand-me-downs and rustic peasant shoes made of bark, if even that. At this time insignia was also primitive, scant strips of red cloth at best. As the Soviet state consolidated however, these would become more developed. Uniforms became more distinctive and insignia more specific in their meanings, evoking symbols of labour or a mythologised Russian historical continuity. Yet this often would not last: once the revolutionary period had ended, many of these elements would be abandoned or even reversed entirely under the coming regime.

== Symbolic origins and the Red Guards ==
On 8 March 1917, (Note: Russia still used the old Julian calendar until 1 February 1918, when the Bolsheviks changed it to the western calendar. The western calendar is 13 days ahead of the Julian so the February Revolution would have begun on 8 March despite its name.) Russia burst into revolution and with it came the fall of the Tsardom and the establishment of a Provisional Government. The defining factor in the fall of the Autocracy was the lack of support from the military: both soldier and sailor rebelled against their officers and joined the masses. The symbols of the old regime, including those of the military, were the target of a campaign of iconoclasm from the populace that would form the basis of Soviet military symbology for years to come.

=== Symbols of rank ===
The Provisional Government was meant to be only a temporary measure in order to host the first elections to the Constituent Assembly, therefore they made few reforms to the old tsarist uniforms. For the most part these seem to have been made to appease the fiery sentiments of the rank and file. To them the worst symbol of the old order were shoulder boards, especially those of officers. This hatred was so great that officers would sometimes be surrounded by gangs of soldiers and have their shoulder boards forcibly torn from their uniforms and in other instances even murder was committed over them. Men also began to refuse taking orders from officers wearing the tsarist monograms on their shoulders. The reasoning behind these acts was aptly described in the diary of an officer paraphrasing his men's interpretation of Order No.1 from the Petrograd Soviet: 'Saluting acknowledges epaulettes which were created by the Tsar: the Father Tsar is no more, so there is no need for epaulettes, and no need to salute'. Early after February shoulder boards were not yet universally hated, with some adding red sewn material or ribbons to their own, but later the idea that shoulders boards were a relic of the Autocracy became monolithic. The renouncing of shoulder boards was a radical expression of equality and this was likely a consideration for the Red Army when creating its own rank insignia.

=== The colour red ===
After February, the culture of the revolutionary underground came to dominate Russian society along with its love for the colour red. For centuries red (krasnaia in Russian) had been the international colour of defiance and revolution but within Russia it had its own unique meanings. Red had been a favoured colour of the Tsars, using it prominently in their architecture such as in the Red Square for example. Iconic buildings in Russia already sporting a revolutionary hue, alongside krasnaia also meaning beautiful, not to mention its populist appeal, gave the colour additional propaganda usage to the Bolsheviks who would succeed in associating the colour with their brand of communism. It is then unsurprising that it would feature so prominently in the Red Army.

=== The Hammer, Sickle, and Plough ===
Though the now famous and undisputed symbol of the Soviet Union and international communism, the Bolsheviks were not the first to use the hammer and sickle nor was it the first to be used by them. The hammer and sickle had adorned the Chilean one peso coin from 1896 and had even decorated the Marinsky Palace, the seat of the Provisional Government – the opponents of the communists in 1917 – in the days after the February Revolution. The crossed hammer and plough, rather than the sickle, would first be used by the Bolsheviks and was meant to represent the unity of the industrial workers and the rural peasantry. The plough would be short lived however and soon replaced by the hammer and sickle in the army in 1919, although the hammer and plough would still see use until 1922.

=== Origins of the red star ===
There are a few stories of how the red star came to be the symbol of the Red Army. One credible source says that in 1917, members of the Moscow garrison were ordered to wear white tin stars on their caps to differentiate themselves from the mass influx of troops returning from the front against the Central Powers. When a revolutionary air came over them, the garrison painted these stars red with the Bolsheviks approving so much of the idea that it would become the official symbol of the Soviet military. Another, though this account is highly questionable, claims that the star was introduced by the large section of Jews in the young government and military who, allegedly, saw the Revolution as the in-progress building of the Promised Land in Russia. The official line from the Bolsheviks, however, was that the star represented world revolution on the 'five continents'. (Note: Presumably Europe, Africa, Asia, and the Americas)

Yet the red star was by no means a new symbol, for it had religious implications deeply rooted in peasant superstition. One pamphlet from 1918 justified to the peasant soldier why he wore the red star in folkloric terms:

"There once was a beautiful maiden named Pravda (Truth) who had a burning red star on her forehead which lit up the whole world and brought it truth, justice, and happiness. One day the red star was stolen by Krivda (falsehood) who wanted to bring darkness and evil to the world. Thus began the rule of Krivda. Meanwhile, Pravda called on the people to retrieve her star and 'return the light of truth to the world'. A good youth conquered Krivda and her forces and returned the red star to Pravda, whereupon the evil forces ran away from the light 'like owls and bats', and 'once again the people lived by truth'."

=== The Red Guards ===
The beginnings of the Red Army and its continuation of this revolutionary symbology can be seen in the Red Guards that preceded it in 1917. These armed bands, primary composed of factory workers, were a wholly volunteer force where commanders were elected during militia meetings. As more men returned from the front their ranks were swelled with soldiers and sailors as well as international volunteers, during the first months of 1918.

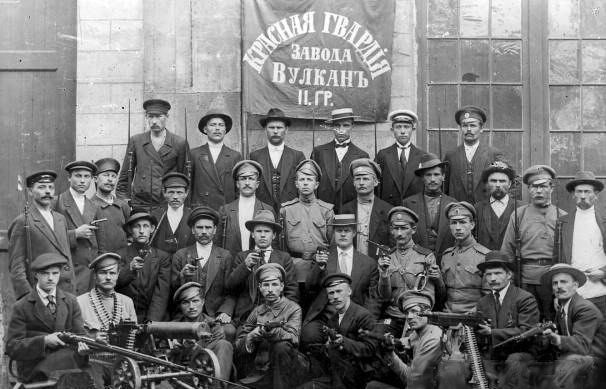
Red Guards of the Vulkan Factory in Petrograd (1917): They wear a mix of military and civilian clothing and seem to lack any kind of Red Guard insignia. In this detachment shoulder boards are still worn by some.

Red Guard uniform, or lack thereof, was a melting pot of both military and civilian garments. Guardsmen wore whatever was available with their scant red symbols being the only thing that united them aesthetically, if even worn. German and Austro-Hungarian POWs turned Red Guards would continue wearing their old uniforms due to a lack of alternatives. During the civil war years, the Red Army would inherit such a situation until new uniforms could be provided.

After their formation following the February Revolution, Red Guards began to wear diagonal (top right to bottom left) red cloth strips on caps and red ribbons alongside red cloth armbands, however the extent to which any of these were worn varied. Some armbands would have writing displaying date of formation, locality or factory of origin, detachment number and/or simply the words 'Red Guard'. Later after November others could feature designs such as Moscow's patron Saint George or badges like those worn by the Militsiya.

== General uniform ==
In the first years of its life, the uniform of the Red Army was anarchic: Both military and civilian garb was worn, men fought each other over life saving army coats in the winter whilst some had to wear ladies' boots. Leon Trotsky had even said to a conference of army political workers in December 1919 that "Comrades, I don't want to frighten you, but ... although we have not been brought down by Denikin or Kolchak, we may yet be brought down by overcoats and boots".

In the first half of 1918, it had become apparent that the new model of army was inadequate, both small in number (200,000 by April) and typically ineffectual in the face of the Germans and the reactionary Volunteer Army. The elections and volunteerism of the Red Guards was abandoned and conscription for men ages 21 to 26 was introduced on 12 June, swelling the size of the army. This engorged force, along with the appalling state of the country's logistics, meant that the introduction of new uniforms and insignia would only be on paper for large portions of the army who would continue on using old tsarist stock and whatever else they could get their hands on. Though the situation would improve over the civil war years, at no point during it could it be said that there was one true uniform. (Note: To record every possible piece of "uniform" worn by the men of the Red Army in this period would be almost impossible and so there will be items that aren't mentioned due to their rarity or obscurity; an effort has been made to cover the subject in as much detail as is feasible.)

=== Red clothing in the Red Army ===
In the early period of the civil war, when troops often had to supply or produce their own uniforms, the cultural obsession with the colour red manifested once more. Soldiers sought out red materials to make their tunics and according to G.H. Mikhailovsk, a Russian diplomat, an entire unit outfitted in the colour occupied Sevastopol in 1919: 'Over all the city... [from] Nakhimovsk Avenue to Ekaterininsk Street [there] was ... a red cavalcade all in red garments from head to toe, with high white gaiters on some... so that they looked like a new type of American red Indian'. Even experienced commanders would wear women's coats with some sense of pride if they sported a suitably proletarian hue.

=== Foreign uniforms ===
After the beginning of the Allied intervention, some foreign uniform pieces began to make their way into the Red Army as Lenin recalled during a 1920 conference: '... and to us now one after [another] approach trains with splendid English equipment, [which] frequently meet Russian Red [Army] men. Whole divisions invested in ... English [clothes] and[,] ... [as] one comrade in the Caucasus [related to me], [a] whole [Red Army] division [wearing] Italian bersale. I feel very sorry that I do not have [any photos] of these ... Red [Army] men ... . I must [admit] ... that the Red Army [is] beholden to English merchants[; merchants] that dress our men via their soldiers, which the Bolsheviks beat and will beat still many more times...'. (Note: This quotation has been heavily paraphrased as the translation it is based on is awkward to read. The original reads '... and to us now one after other approach trains with splendid English equipment, frequently meet Russian Red army men. Whole divisions invested in splendid English cloths and on-days to me related one comrade in the Caucasus, that whole red army mans division wore Italian bersale. I feel very sorry that I do not have to show to you photographic photos of these Russian Red army men dressed in bersale. I must say that English equipment was worn where suitable and that the Red Army was beholden to English merchants. Merchant that dress our men via their soldiers, which the Bolsheviks beat and will beat still many more times...'.) There was much truth behind these words as shown by British Major General Knox's outrage at the situation in Siberia during 1919: 80% of the White Army's conscripts had run off to the Red side of the front, presumably taking 200,000 British uniforms with them. Commissar Trotsky sent a letter to Knox thanking him for his donation.

=== 1918 ===
==== Headwear ====
The most prevalent piece of headwear for all native sides during the civil war was the peaked service cap (furashka) of the Imperial Army. These would have varied from khaki to olive in colour with a front peak and maybe a chinstrap in black leather or the same khaki-olive cloth – caps made wholly of leather were favoured by commanders. The M1910 winter cap (papakha) (Note: This military hat is different in construction to the civilian papakha.) was also worn as well as innumerable different types of fur hat. The papakha consisted of a khaki headpiece with an upward folded front flap and a wider upward folded rear flap that could be folded down to cover the ears and neck; The flaps were made of either light grey natural or artificial astrakhan wool. A khaki side cap (pilotka) was introduced in 1916 for Russian soldiers to wear under French supplied Adrian helmets but in the Red Army these were often reserved for cadets. Occasionally, some units would wear Shakos from old Imperial stores when on parade.

==== Tunics and greatcoats ====
Various wool and cotton field shirts – all called gymnastiorkas – were very common, especially amongst the lower ranks. These all had standing collars fastened by two buttons as well as two or three buttons that, along with the opening to be fastened, stopped about halfway down the khaki-olive shirt – they could turn an off white with enough hard wear and washing however. Among commanders 'French' tunics were popular, this being a slang term for tunics of British or American style: Such tunics typically had turnover or standing collars, four external pockets (two chest and two waist), and buttoned cuff flaps. Officers additionally wore kitels which were similar to the 'French' but with standing collar, internal skirt pockets, and no cuff flaps. Black leather jackets of varying styles were also popular among Red commanders just as it came to be in the last war.

The standard-issue greatcoat (shinel) was double-breasted with a falling collar and was grey to brown with hooks instead of buttons, some with decorative buttons, or light blue-grey with two rows of six buttons– an officer's variant. The cavalry coat was longer, cut just above the ankle rather than mid-shin, and had cuffs that curved to a point at the back and front; all were cinched at the rear with a half-belt and two buttons. Sometimes a bashlyk, a kind of stand-alone hood, would be worn as well.

==== Leg and footwear ====
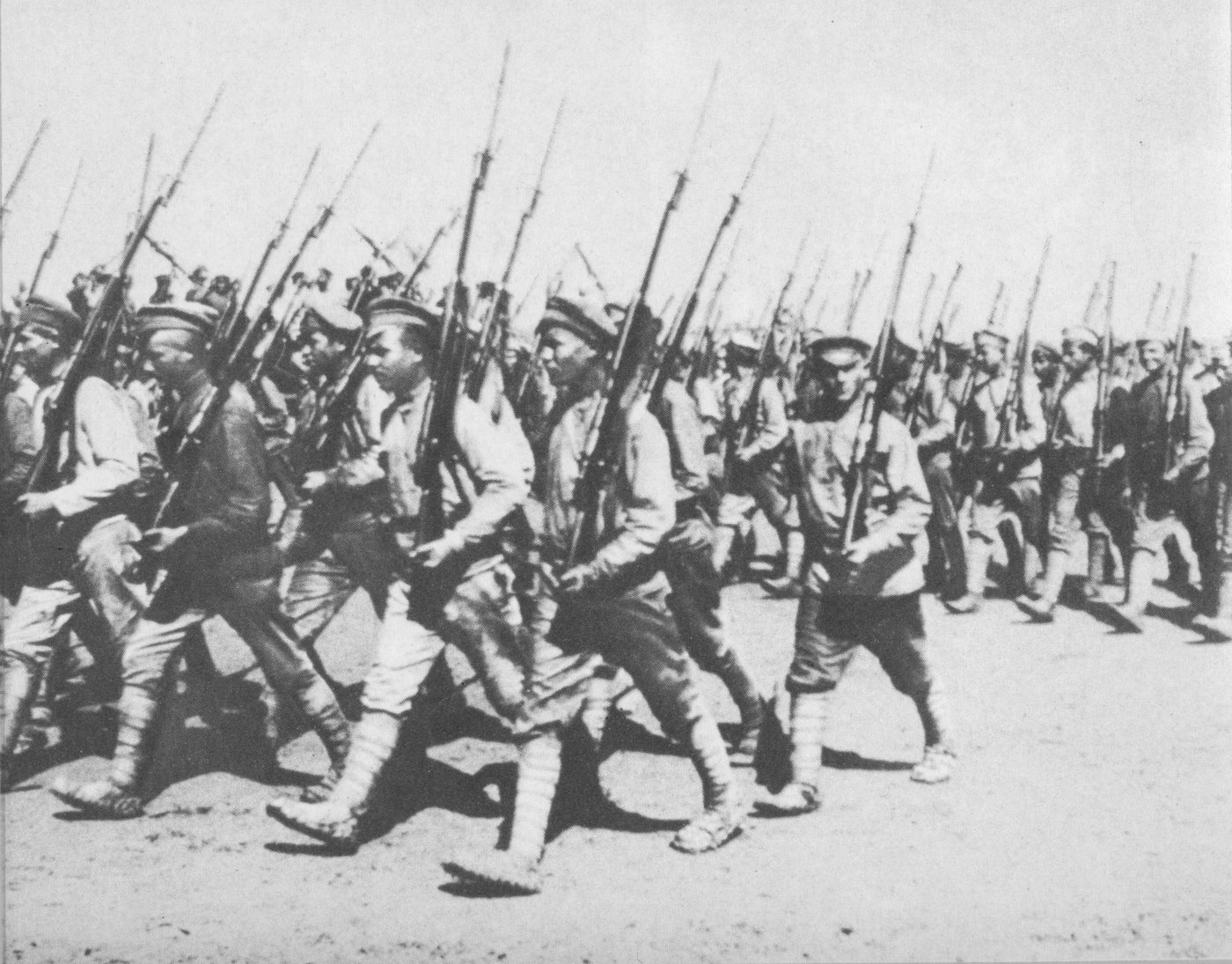
A Red Army parade in Harkov (1920): They wear furashka caps, gymnastiorkas, sharovari trousers, and puttees. Note the prevalence of lapti peasant shoes. None of these men seem to be wearing Red Army insignia; this, along with sharing the same uniforms, would often lead to Reds and Whites mistaking each other for allies, or friends for enemies, during the Civil War.

All men wore trousers (sharovari) of some kind. For many officers these took the form of breeches whilst most soldiers wore semi-breeches – tight at the calf and loose at the thigh but less so than full breeches. Once again leather was especially popular with commanders. During World War 1, the black leather jackboots worn by the army had to be supplemented with puttees and ankle boots; critical shortages of either lead to the introduction of lapti, a kind of slipper made of leather or woven birch bark by peasants, for many in the Red Army. Both military and civilian leather boots, puttees, and leather or canvas gaiters were in use – the first being, again, popular with Red commanders. Valenki felt overboots would also be worn in winter if available.

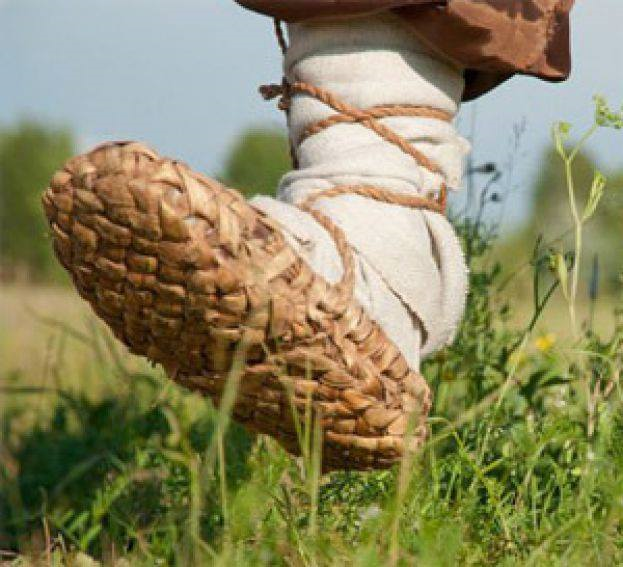
Lapti made of woven birch bark.

==== Equipment ====
The most commonly worn equipment for the average soldier was a brown leather ammunition belt with one to two ammunition pouches or a bandolier in leather, linen, or canvas. A variety of haversacks and backpacks were worn usually of cloth or canvas. When not worn, and if procured, greatcoats would be fastened in bandolier-style over the shoulder and under the arm. During the early parts of the Civil War, ammunition belts for machine guns were often worn criss-crossed over the chest either for convenience or necessity. Bayonet frogs, entrenching tools, curved debout knives and water bottle-tin bowl combinations could also be seen.

Commanders in the field typically wore a brown leather belt with none, one, or two braces arranged vertically over the shoulder or crossed across the chest. After November 1917 wearing vertical braces was banned, presumably to help differentiate between friend and foe, but this changed little. Upon these belts or on separate cross straps were worn map cases, pistol holsters – although simply tucking pistols into belts was common practice until 1922 – kindzhal daggers, binocular cases, and whistles on the brace. Sabres and shashkas were worn in the 'oriental' manner – usually on a separate strap with the cutting edge facing backwards. Leather equipment of Caucasian chic, black with chased silver ornaments, was deemed especially fashionable amongst those on the southern fronts.

==== Insignia ====
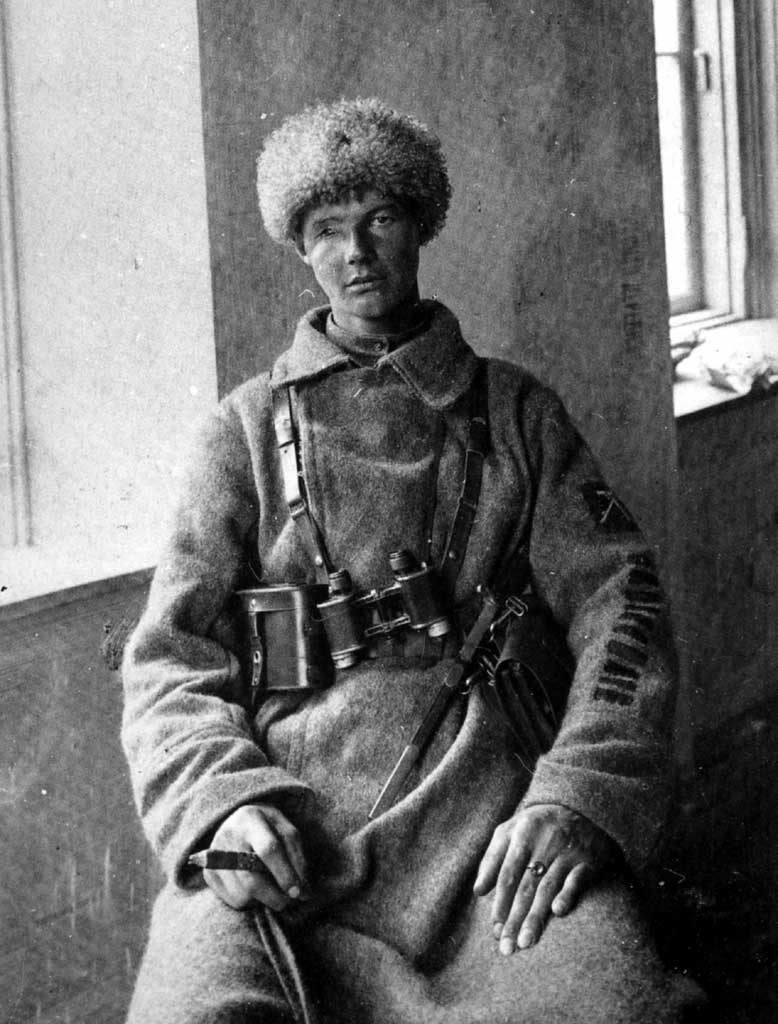
Pictured is Anton Blisnyak, a machine gun team instructor of the 1st Revolutionary Cavalry Regiment. He wears a standard issue Imperial Army greatcoat and a kubanka hat. From his belt hangs a naval dirk whilst on his left sleeve is a machine gun team badge embroidered in gold. Under this patch are ten red wound stripes despite Blisnyak having received a great many more.

During the Red Army's brief flirtation with military democracy, insignia was essentially along the same lines as that of the Red Guards; the only further development beyond this at that time was a cloth red star above the left cuff indicating a commander of a force of any size. After its return to form, the army began to slowly introduce its own distinct insignia. The first of these, introduced by the Supreme Military Soviet (SMS) (Note: This organisation took over responsibility for the armed forces from the Soviet of People's Commissars on Military and Naval Affairs no later than 4th March. Its chairman was Leon Trotsky as the People's Commissar on Military and Naval Affairs.) on 29 July, was 'the Revolutionary Military Symbol of the Red Army': a red enamel or painted star containing a bronze hammer-and-plough device set within a silver wreath – an oak branch on the left side and a laurel on the right. This was essentially the Red Army's membership badge worn on the left breast. It was initially worn by only commanders and cadets but soon could be worn by all Red Army servicemen – if this or the sleeve star was not worn the quality of a man's uniform could imply his status as a commander. These badges would sometimes be augmented with shoulder board branch badges from the old army.

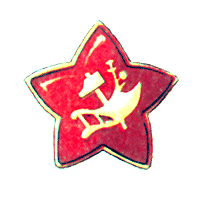
Red star badge as of People's Commissar of War Affairs Order No. 594 (from 29 July 1918)

On the same day a dedicated cap badge of a slightly convex enamel or painted star with hammer-and-plough was also introduced. This was intended to be worn on the band but would often be worn on the crown instead. In 1918 the star was actually worn "upside down" (two points up and one down) but would be changed to the expected orientation by the end of the year. In lieu of official red stars, one of the unofficial locally made variants, or Red Guard style cloth insignia, soldiers would sometimes wear the golden stars from old tsarist officers' shoulder boards and in other cases branch of service badges (an example would be the crossed cannons of the artillery).

Not until 1920 would the Red Army have its own branch insignia and so innumerable unofficial designs were worn, if not tsarist symbols. These were sometimes based on the branch insignia designs of the old army, such as the machine gun worn on the shoulder boards of imperial machine gunners, but now worn on the upper left sleeve in embroidered gold wire.

On 21 October, the month the Soviet government adopted the Geneva Convention, the Revolutionary Military Council of the Republic (RMCR) (Note: This organisation, sometimes abbreviated to Revvoyensoviet, would take over from the Supreme Military Soviet on 6 September 1918 with Trotsky still retaining his role as chairman in the new organisation.) signed Order No. 120 which elaborated on the insignia to be worn by sanitary personnel in the army: 'Due to the fact of enemy violence towards the sanitary personnel, providing aid for the wounded and sick servicemen, it is prescribed: ... To the military-sanitary personnel to have the enamel mark of the Red Cross on the cap-band instead of the former [imperial] cockade, and to those working on a battlefield, besides – the Red Cross [on a white] armband on the left sleeve'.

Above the left cuff, cloth or braid wound stripes in red or yellow were sometimes worn; this was a continuation of those introduced in 1916.

=== 1919 ===
In the previous year the RMCR created one 'Commission on the Elaboration of Uniform' on 25 April. The purpose of the commission, as the name implies, was to host a competition starting on 7 May to design new uniforms and insignia for the Red Army. Many prominent artists and designers took part, with the commission's decisions on new uniforms, insignia, and branch of service colours finalised on 18 December. The RMCR backed these decisions on 16 January 1919 through Order No. 116 which announced their official adoption into the army.

==== The tsarist myth ====
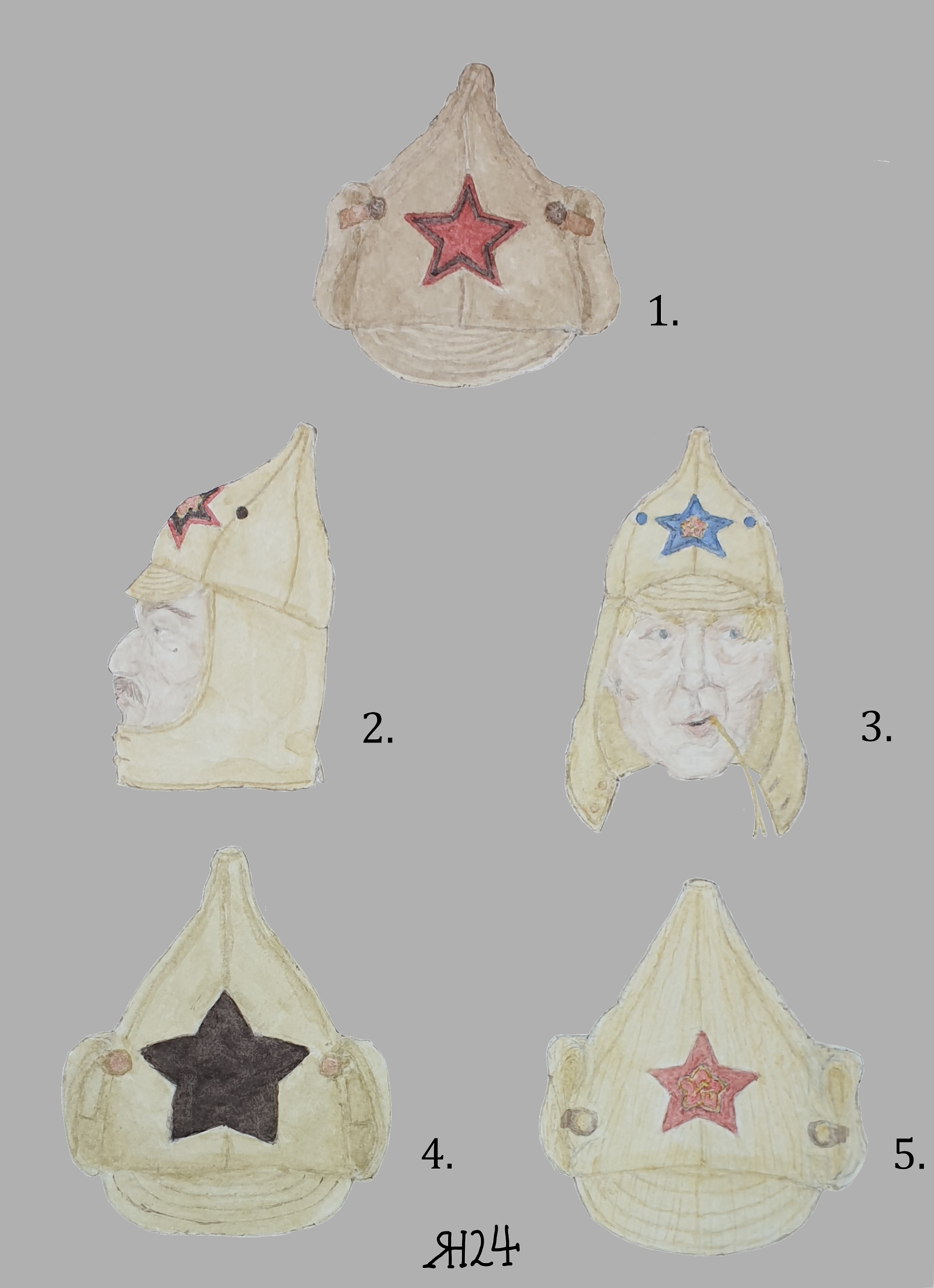
1919 issue budenovkas: note the varying materials, cuts, and colours used. 1: This infantry budenovka is of the first pattern as indicated by the shorter drooping point (no stiffening rod) and the lack of a cap badge. Black lines the inner edge of the crimson star. The buttons are made of bone. 2: A khaki second pattern budenovka with the red bordered black star of the engineers and black cloth covered buttons. 3: Second pattern budenovka in cavalry colours. The blue star has black lines near the inner edge. 4: This second pattern budenovka's abnormally large engineer star lacks the red edging typical of the branch. The brass buttons are embossed with the hammer and plough. 5: Another second pattern example, this one being made of corduroy for summer use. The buttons are covered in corduroy and the star lacks the black inner edging.

It has been erroneously claimed that the M1919 Red Army uniform actually originated in 1913 in order to commemorate the tricentenary of the Romanovs. These uniforms, with three tabs across the chest apparently commemorating each century of the dynasty, would have supposedly been taken from already existing stores and modified for Red Army use. This is likely due to the fact that the budenovka hat was originally designed in 1913 for the Imperial Army – though never seeing use – and this fact has since been blown out of proportion.

==== Headwear ====
The most famous piece of the new M1919 uniform was the budenovka, although it only became commonly worn from 1920. This woollen khaki headgear, intended for winter use, could easily be identified by the blunt cloth "spike" that protruded from the top below which was a cloth peak and a cloth flap – secured with branch colour buttons and leather straps – which could be rolled down to cover the neck, ears, and chin. On the front was worn a cloth star (4.3–8.8 cm in diameter) in branch of service colour with a black lining within the star following close to its edges – black stars had red lines around the edges (both 5–6 mm in width). A second pattern was introduced on 8 April 1919 with a taller point, a stiffening rod to prevent the point drooping, and a larger star (10.5 cm in diameter) with an enamel Red Army cap badge worn in its centre. Men who modified their budenovkas to have even taller points were jokingly nicknamed "umootvod", meaning rod-brains – the taller the point the smaller the brain.

The hat was named after the famed and moustachioed cavalry commander Semyon Budyonny, however budenovka was just one of a few names it was to be known by. The official name was shlem (helmet) but it was first widely known as a bogatirka due its semblance to the helmets of the medieval bogatyrs of Russian legend; the hat was designed by the artist Victor Vasnetsov who was well known for his folkloric paintings of such figures. For a time it was also known as the frunzevka in tribute to Mikhail Frunze, another Red commander, whose troops included weavers who were some of the first to produce and wear the hat.

==== Tunics and greatcoats ====
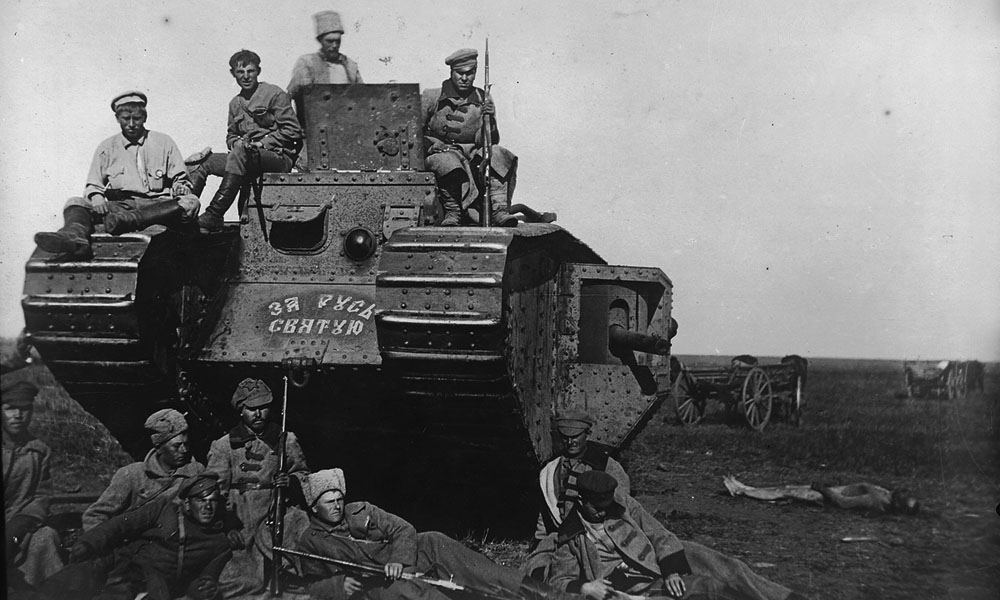
British tank captured by troops of the 51st Rifle Division near Kakhovka (1920): Though most wear old imperial stock, four men (two right most on the ground, right most on the tank, and the man in the budenovka with the large star) wear the 1919 issue kaftan. Note the red collar tabs and piping, the red chest tabs, and the dark khaki collar and cuffs.

The new khaki tunic, introduced from 8 April 1919, was very similar to the Tsarist gymnastiorka but with a few notable additions and changes. The two buttons that went down the chest were now concealed under a cloth strip and it forwent buttons for two sets of hooks to fasten the collar; two buttons fastened the gathered cuffs and flapless internal waist pockets were added; three horizontal mirrored spearhead shaped tabs called razgovory were worn across the chest button flap (22 cm x 4.5 cm), as well as a smaller one across the neck (8 cm x 2.5 cm), all in branch colour. In the field khaki razgovory would sometimes replace the coloured ones. Some commanders would have their old gymnastiorkas tailored so that they would better resemble the new shirt.

The kaftan (Note: Note the difference between this military coat and civilian kaftans.) was the new greatcoat for the army that, much like the new gymnastiorka, had only changed in few ways from its predecessor. The colour was now khaki with a darker shade for the collar, pocket flaps and cuffs; two vertical internal pockets were at the waist and two at the breast with the former having flaps and the latter none; the kaftan's dark khaki cuffs would curve upward at the back; instead of a half belt at the rear, the kaftan had smaller half-belts on both left and right sides; the diamond-shaped collar tabs were in branch colour as well as the three small razgovory chest tabs that went down the right side fastening the coat opening, which was also off centre, along with four sets of hooks; branch colour piping would sometimes be worn on the collar and cuffs. Just as with the new tunic, in the field khaki razgovory were meant to be worn.

The razgovory were in all likelihood meant to evoke the chest tabs worn by the Streltsy who had themselves revolted against the Autocracy in 1698. The meaning behind this nickname isn't definitively known as it can be understood as meaning 'a conversation', 'a mess', or 'to mess around'. The first interpretation could be linked to how Red commanders and commissars were, supposedly, the first to receive the new coats and so their men saw the garb as synonymous with their 'big talking' superiors, whilst the latter could simply refer to the fiddly nature of fastening the tab's buttons.

==== Insignia ====
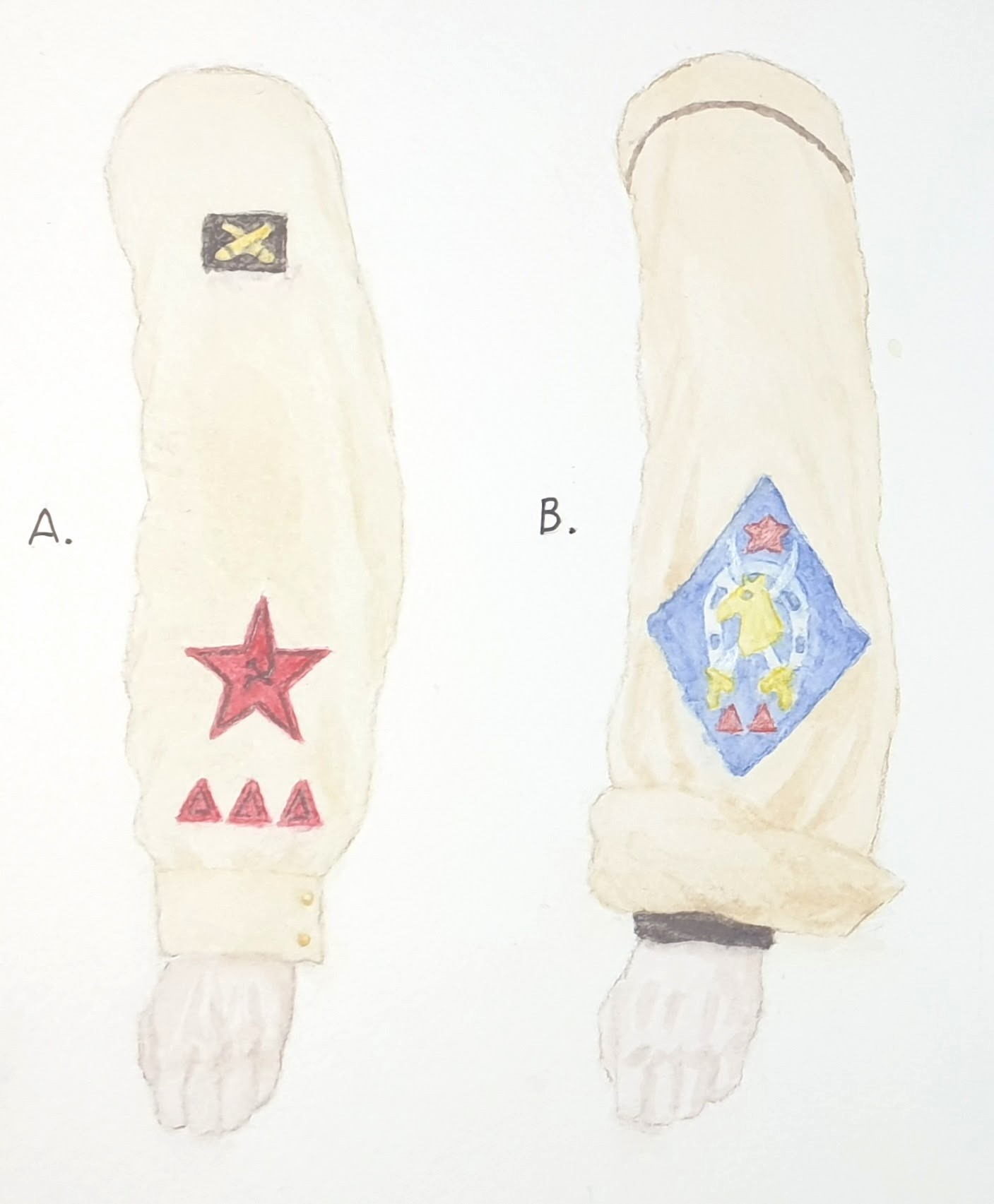
Rank sleeve insignia: A: The 1919 regulation rank patch, here showing the three triangles of a starshina (equivalent to a sergeant major). Above is worn an unofficial artillery patch. B: An example of a non-regulation patch combining a popular cavalry badge design with that of the rank of pomkomvzvoda (equivalent to a sergeant).

As the army became more conventionally hierarchical, the lack of any kind of distinctive rank insignia beyond the universal, and vague, red sleeve star became a greater issue. This was attested to by commanders such as I.P. Uborevich of the 18th Rifle Division who went to the lengths of creating a system of symbols for his own unit not long before the introduction of the official rank markings. This official insignia took the form of a red cloth star (11 cm in diameter) with a black border near the inner edge containing a black hammer and sickle above the left cuff (centred 12.5 cm above the cuff): under this star would be one to four triangles (4 cm a side), squares (3 cm a side), or diamonds (3.5 cm height and 3 cm width) organised in a horizontal line also of red cloth with the black inner edge border. The senior ranks, which used diamonds, had a larger star (14.5 cm in diameter) which had an additional black inner edging within the first – the diamonds also had this additional edging. Various local and unofficial variants of these insignia also existed, with some of these combining both rank and branch distinctions. Often commanders would organize the shapes into unique patterns until uniformity could be properly enforced.

The ranks were as follows:

Rank insignia as of RMCR Order No.116 (from 16 January 1919)
Rank	Equivalent	Insignia
Krasnoarmeyets ('Red Army man')	Private	None
Otdelyonniy komandir	Corporal	One triangle
Pomkomvzvoda	Sergeant	Two triangles
Starshina	Company sergeant major	Three triangles
Komvzvoda	Lieutenant	One square
Komroty	Captain	Two squares
Kombat	Major	Three squares
Kompolka	Colonel	Four squares
Kombrig	Brigadier	One diamond
Nachdiv	Major general	Two diamonds
Komandarm	Lieutenant general	Three diamonds
Komfronta	General	Four diamonds

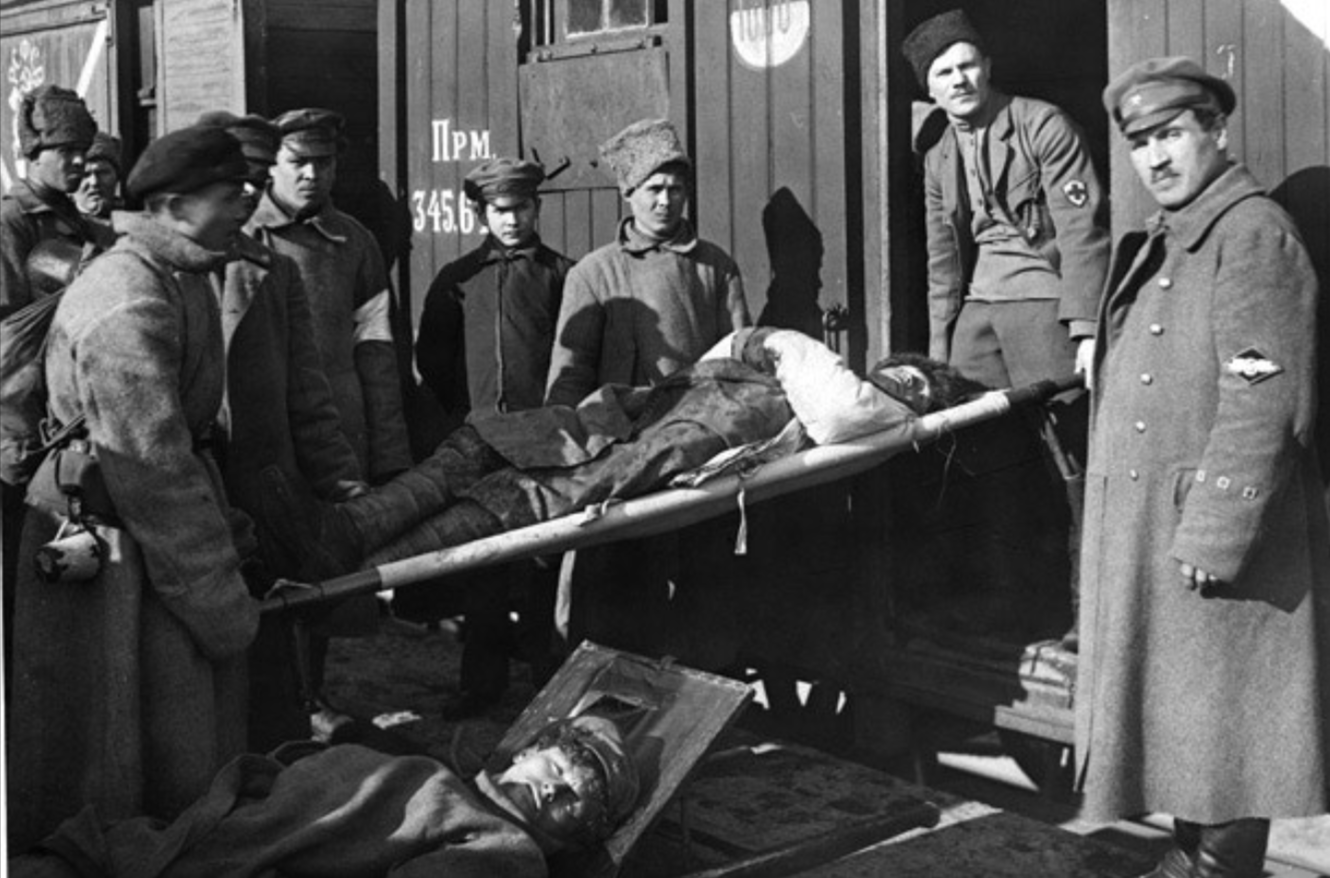
The wounded are evacuated from Kronstadt (1921): To the right stands the railway's commandant who, against regulation, wears his sleeve patch sans armband. He wears the three squares of a battalion commander which he has edged with white thread (presumably a local innovation). Just behind him a medic wears an unofficial sleeve patch piped red (the regulation armband is being worn further to his left).

The new 1919 regulations also introduced distinct branch colours to the army. These were as follows:

Branch colours as of RMCR Order No.116 (from 16 January 1919)
Branch	Colour
General Staff	Black (velvet) piped crimson
Infantry	Crimson
Cavalry	Medium blue
Artillery	Orange
Engineers	Black
Medical Service	Same as attached branch
Air Service	Light blue
Border Guards	Green

On 22 August, RMCR Order No. 1406 was implemented which introduced sleeve insignia for military transportation personnel. (Note: This included railway commandants, a previously civilian profession that was now militarised.) This consisted of a black, velvet, horizontal diamond (12 cm by 8 cm) edged green (3mm width) and containing a two winged railcar wheel embroidered in silver on the left sleeve. Commanders wore this patch on a red armband (12 cm width) with black lines near the top and bottom edges and attached commissars the same but with dark yellow edging rather than green.

During the year it had become a popular practice to return deserters back to their unit with a black armband sewn to their sleeve. At the beginning of 1920 however, this practice was phased out as it would lead to said deserter being antagonised by their fellow soldiers, sometimes to the point of violence or death.

=== 1920 ===
==== Insignia ====
1920 saw the introduction of official branch insignia via one RMCR Order No. 572. The decision to implement such insignia was taken at the end of 1919 which was then followed, on 5 January, by the first design illustrations from the artist V.M. Popov – these being for the Infantry, Cavalry, Artillery, and Engineers. The designs were approved by the RMCR and so a commission was established to further elaborate on them. This commission further assessed these badges – as well as a new design for aviation – over 15 days after which, on 1 March, the final variations were agreed to by the RMCR and were added to the official uniform on 3 April as per the order.

These patches were worn on the upper left sleeve with each consisting of a shape in branch colour with gold (or silver for the Engineers) embroidery near the edges; in the centre of this would be a red star on a sun from which sunbursts (in the same embroidery) would emanate; on the lower half of the patch, superimposed over the sunburst, would be a green semi-circle or wedge in green representing the earth upon which would be an embroidered or metal branch emblem.

The specifics for each badge are as follows:

Branch sleeve patches as of RMCR Order No.572 (from 3 April 1920)
Branch	Image (Note: Images may vary in scale.)	Notes	Dimensions
Infantry			63mmx100mm
Cavalry			60mmx75mm
Artillery		Due to an error in Order No. 572, the colour for the artillery patch was described as scarlet, rather than the artillery branch's orange, which was not corrected until 6 March 1922 by Order No. 89 of the Main Chief of Logistics.	50mmx95mm
Engineer		On engineers patches the branch emblem on the bottom half would vary by speciality.	63mmx63mm
Air Service		The wings and propeller of each patch varied in colour by specialty: black wings and propeller – military and naval pilots; silver wings and propeller – observers; gold wings and propeller – other airmen.	100mmx63mm

These would be edged to denote the acts of a servicemen: in gold for a member of a unit awarded the Order of the Red Banner and in silver for receiving a wound or for serving with the army in the field for over a year whilst also taking part in a major battle.

== Branch and other uniforms ==
=== Air Service ===
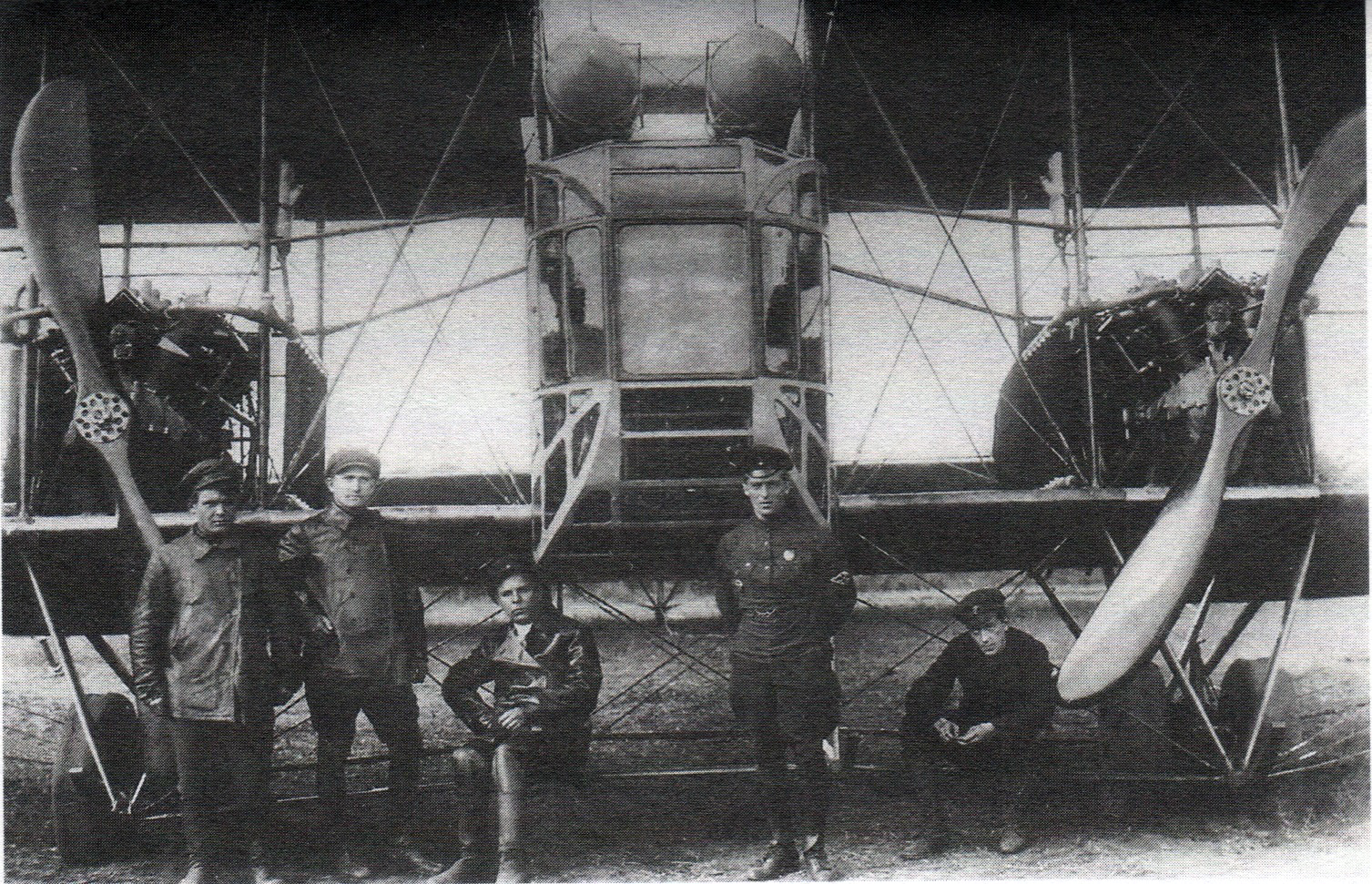
Air crew after a raid at the Fedorovka station airfield (1920): Here the prevalence of black leathers is shown nicely not only of jackets (three leftmost men) but also of caps (far left) and breeches (left sitting). Based on his dark clothing, the centre standing man likely shows us a fairly typical airman's uniform when grounded; He wears the black, piped red cap and breeches of the Imperial air force, its dark blue gymnastiorka, and gaiters with his shoes. The small badge on his cap is likely the 'duck' and his sleeve patch show's the aviator's eagle with a red star upon a diamond - possibly in the branch's light blue. His belt is of the chased silver Caucasian style.

The communist's pilots, many of them having gained their wings in the Imperial air force, brought much of its fashion with them. This typically consisted of dark blue gymnastiorkas or 'frenchs'; black breeches with red piping with either black riding boots or leather gaiters and shoes; and black side caps or peaked caps piped in red, though captured khaki British caps were especially coveted.

In the air leathers would be worn: leather flying helmets and goggles of all imaginable kinds – most commonly the brown leather M1914 helmet – could be seen; black leather jackets were popular, especially the M1914 pilot's jacket – distinguished by its red-piped, black, cloth collar and two rows of six silver buttons – as well as sometimes the French Air Service's horizon blue flying coat – some aviators served in France during the Great War.

When it came to insignia, whilst some pilots wore the red star on their caps, more common were the old shoulder board badges: either the propeller with wings (nicknamed the utka or duck) or the old Imperial double-headed eagle badge clutching sword, flaming grenade, and propeller with the crown removed (derided as the kuritsa or chicken) – these could also be worn pinned onto the Red Army chest badge or as designs seen on sleeve patches; on flying helmets would be worn the double-headed eagle and propeller badge with the crown above replaced with the red star; upon belts could be worn dirks, essentially the badge of the Imperial air force; fashionable among those who flew there was the practice of wearing French pilot's insignia.

=== Armour ===
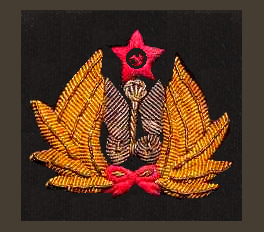
An unofficial sleeve patch of a motorised unit commander.

Uniforms for armoured units, (Note: Armoured cars, armoured trains, and tanks.) just as it was during World War 1, were defined by the rich use of black leather. Service caps with large crowns and squared visors in either leather or olive-khaki cloth were worn. In addition to service caps, black leather budenovkas were also sometimes seen. The near universal garment was black leather jackets of all kinds though the most common was the 1912 issue, double-breasted 'Swedish' jacket under which was worn a gymnastiorka. Below this were worn leather or cloth trousers with leather jack boots or boots with gaiters.

Although at this time a part of the engineers, they would become their own branch in 1922, armoured troops much preferred their own distinct insignia with its motifs inherited from the Imperial Army. These badges varied greatly but common were the Imperial armour's wheels, wings, and machine gun and its wheels, wings, and steering wheel. Armoured train insignia typically took the form of combinations of railway, artillery, and machine-gun badges or sleeve patches depicting the crew's train with its name and/or number.

=== Cavalry ===
In the civil war years, the uniforms worn by most cavalrymen varied only slightly when compared to the other branches: A sabre or shashka was carried, bandoliers were common whilst dark blue breeches were sometimes seen, and stirrups were worn over boots. In addition to these, a cavalry variant of the 1919 issue kaftan was introduced, which only differed in having an open slit down the back of the skirt starting 14 cm below the waist. A branch arm badge was also introduced in 1920.

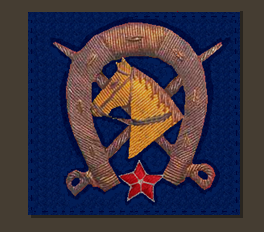
An example of a non-regulation cavalry sleeve patch. Such horse's head, shoe, and sabres designs were very popular leading to great difficulty in replacing them with the regulation patch in 1920.

==== Bashkir Cavalry Division (1919–1921) ====
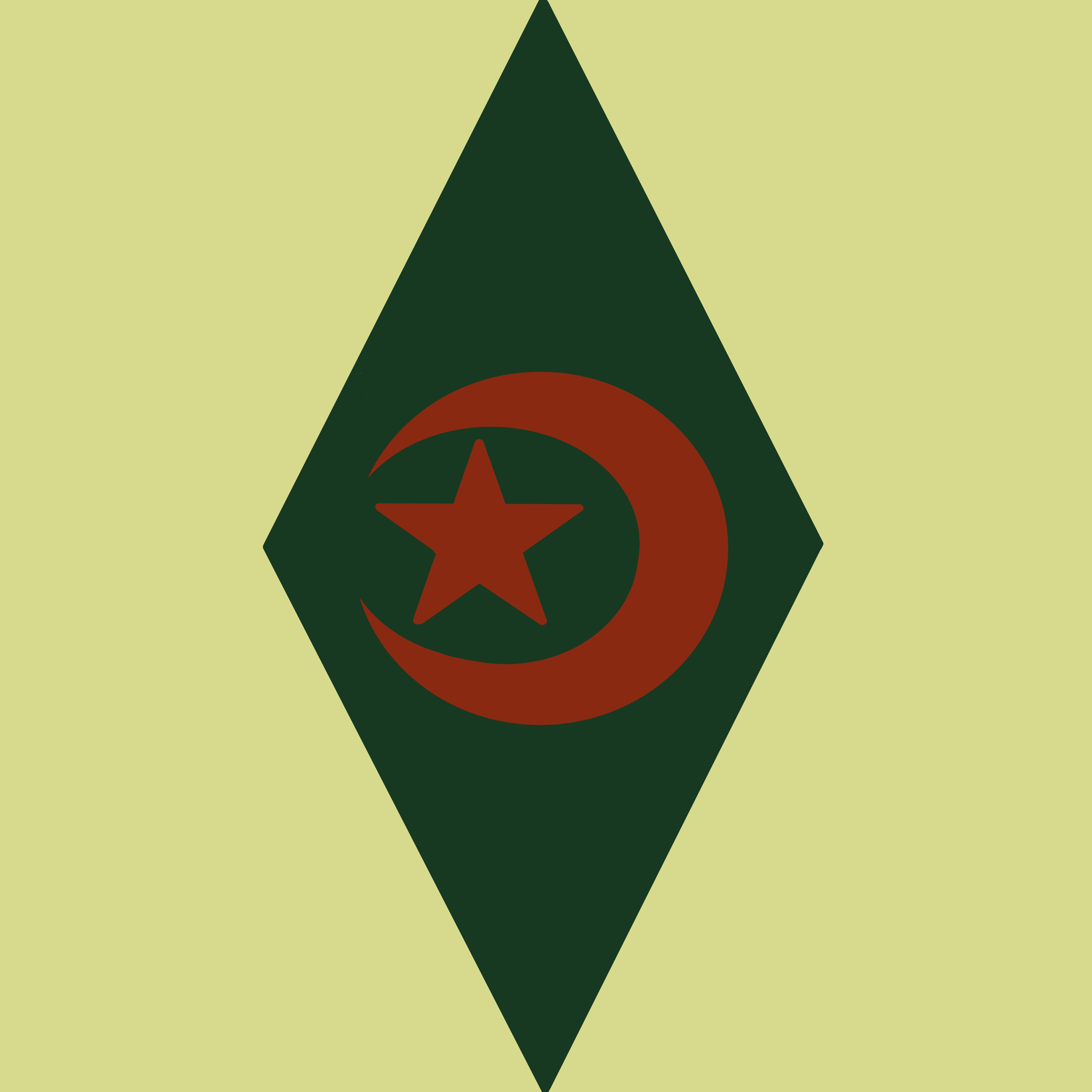
Sleeve patch of the Bashkir Cavalry Division.

Formed in 1919, the Bashkirs of this division – later a brigade – wore much the same as the average Red Army man but with some exceptional details: D.I. Kotomkin, a commander of a battalion of Bashkirs, described how the "front of their caps had green piping [and] on the sleeve was a green diamond patch with a red star and a half moon". This patch was worn on the upper left sleeve and versions with a gold, embroidered border, star, and crescent could sometimes be seen – possibly a version for commanders.

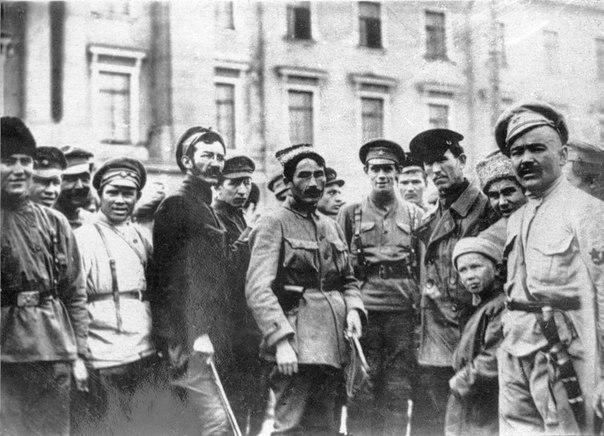
Command staff of the Bashkir Cavalry Division (1919): One of them (far right) wears the unit's sleeve patch without the diamond backing. None of these men appear to be wearing the piping as described by Kotomkin.

===== Cossacks (1918–1920) =====
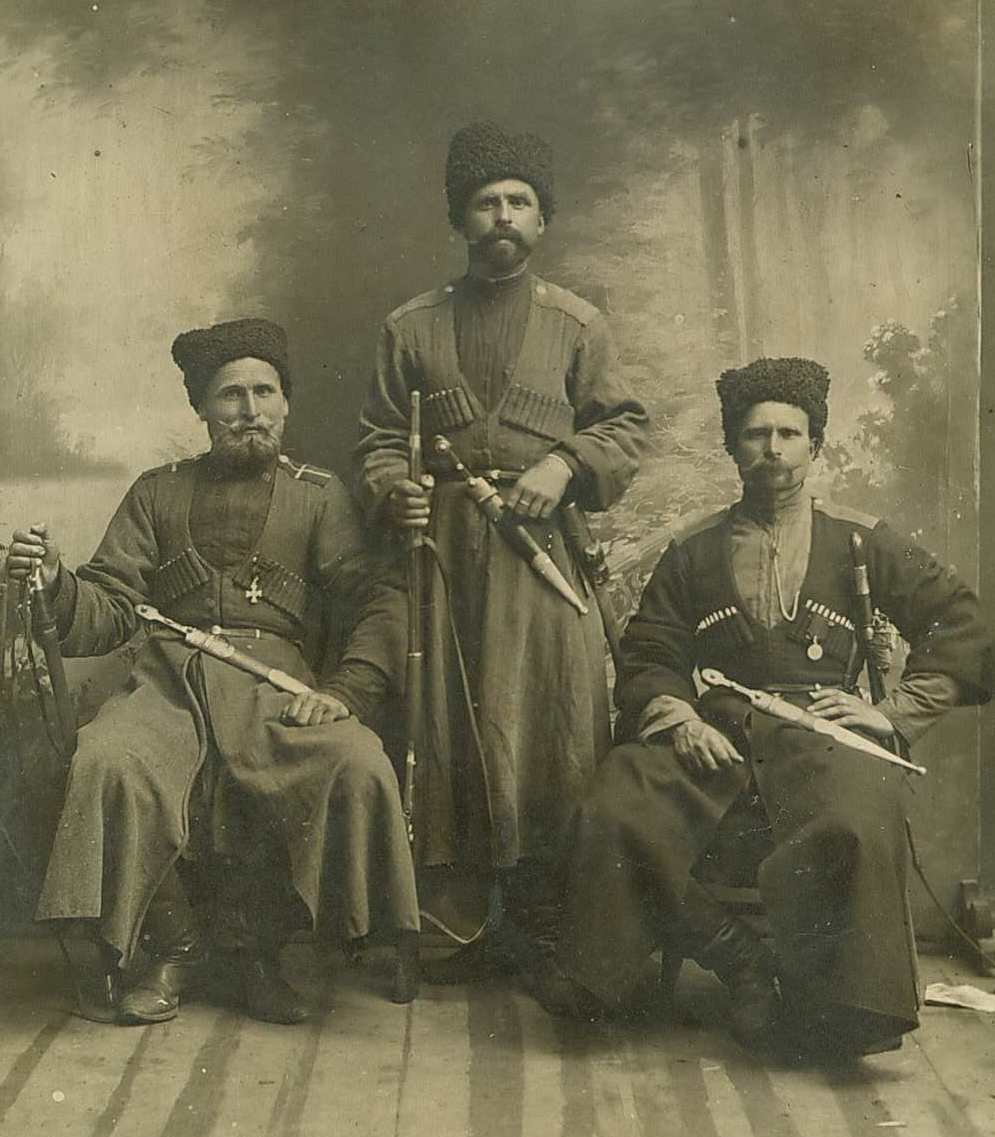
Kuban Cossacks serving during the First World War (1915): Though in Imperial service, these Cossacks would show a good example of the typical Red Kuban if not for the shoulder boards, tsarist medals, and lack of Red Army insignia.

A Cossack's uniform varied depending upon which host he originated from and were a continuation of the old Imperial uniform but with the appropriate changes of insignia. Cossacks of the Kuban Host wore their traditional garb: a short black fleece hat (kubanka) with red crown; a red or drab-coloured linen shirt (beshmet) over which would be worn a drab-coloured, ankle-length robe (cherkeska) with a deep v-neck and 7-11 decorative cartridge tubes (gaziry) on each breast which were a traditional indicator of rank – these would sometimes be used to carry ammunition and modified to show off the bullets of rifle stripper clips in a way that was trendy during World War 1; dark blue breeches which were piped red; soft leather, heelless boots which would be worn without stirrups as Cossacks traditionally used a short leather whip (nagaika) to drive their mounts – although conventional boots and stirrups may also have been worn; a red or drab-coloured bashlyk hood; and a decorative black leather belt with dangling straps and silver chased ornamentation from which would hang a kindzhal dagger and a shashka sabre.

Don Cossacks wore a much more conventional uniform: khaki gimnastiorkas; tall black fleece hats with red crowns or leather peaked caps with dark blue crowns, red bands and red crown piping; and lastly dark blue trousers with wide red stripes down the outer seams tucked into jackboots.

The Orenburg Cossacks, combining the Kuban and Don styles, wore khaki gimnastiorkas but with decorative cartridge tubes. Along with these were worn dark blue, leather peaked caps with light blue bands and crown piping as well as dark blue trousers with wide light blue stripes with boots.

==== Detached International Cavalry Division (1918–1920) ====
Many POWs would join the Reds during the war and Hungarians were no exception. These men would plunder old Austro-Hungarian stores left from the occupation of Ukraine for their uniforms, representing an odd combination of imperial hussar and Russian frontovik. All men wore the bright scarlet Austrian peakless cap – Emperor Franz Jozef's monogram was covered with the red star – and Russian gymnasterkas and greatcoats. The Hungarian squadrons wore the red hussar's breeches with knots and piping down the outer seam, whilst the others wore regular khaki sharovari. Infantry units had Russian peaked caps and puttees with ankle boots.

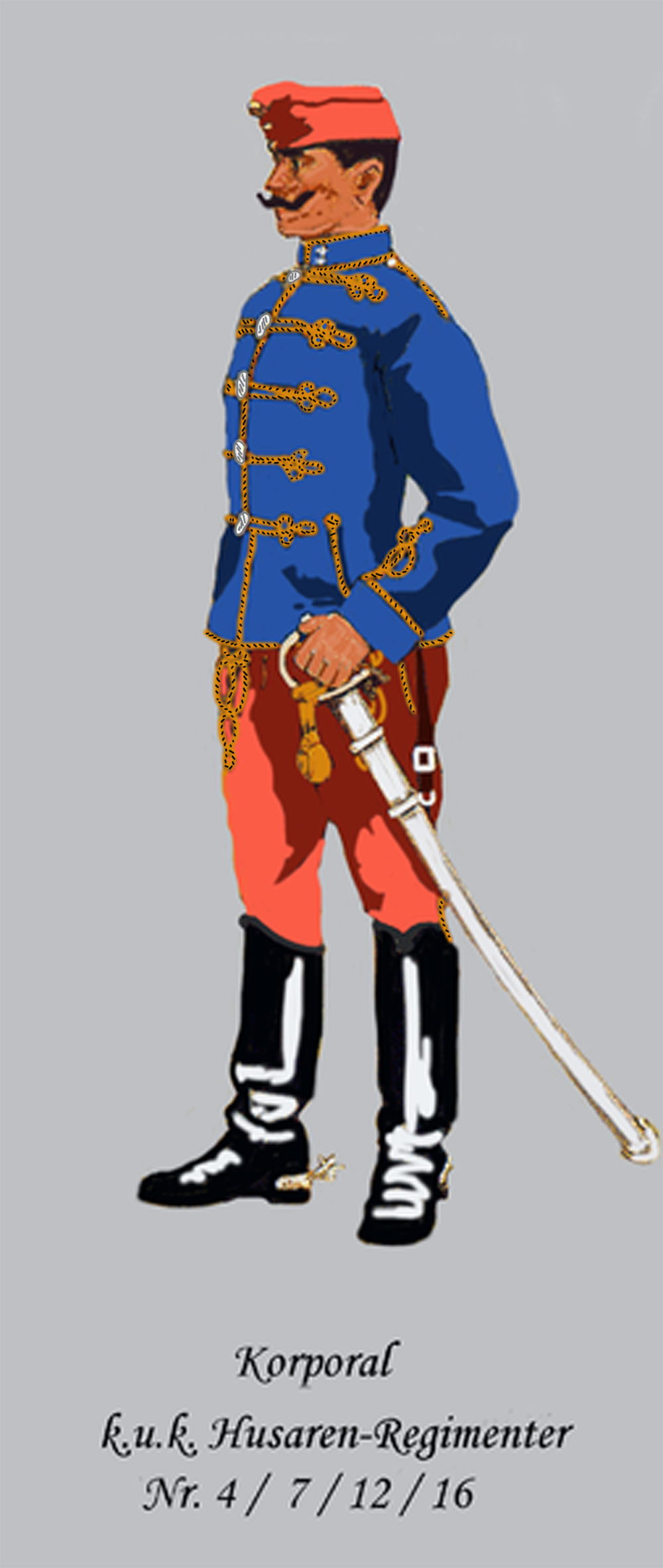
A hussar in Austro-Hungarian service. (1916)

===== 'Red Hussars' (1918–1921) =====
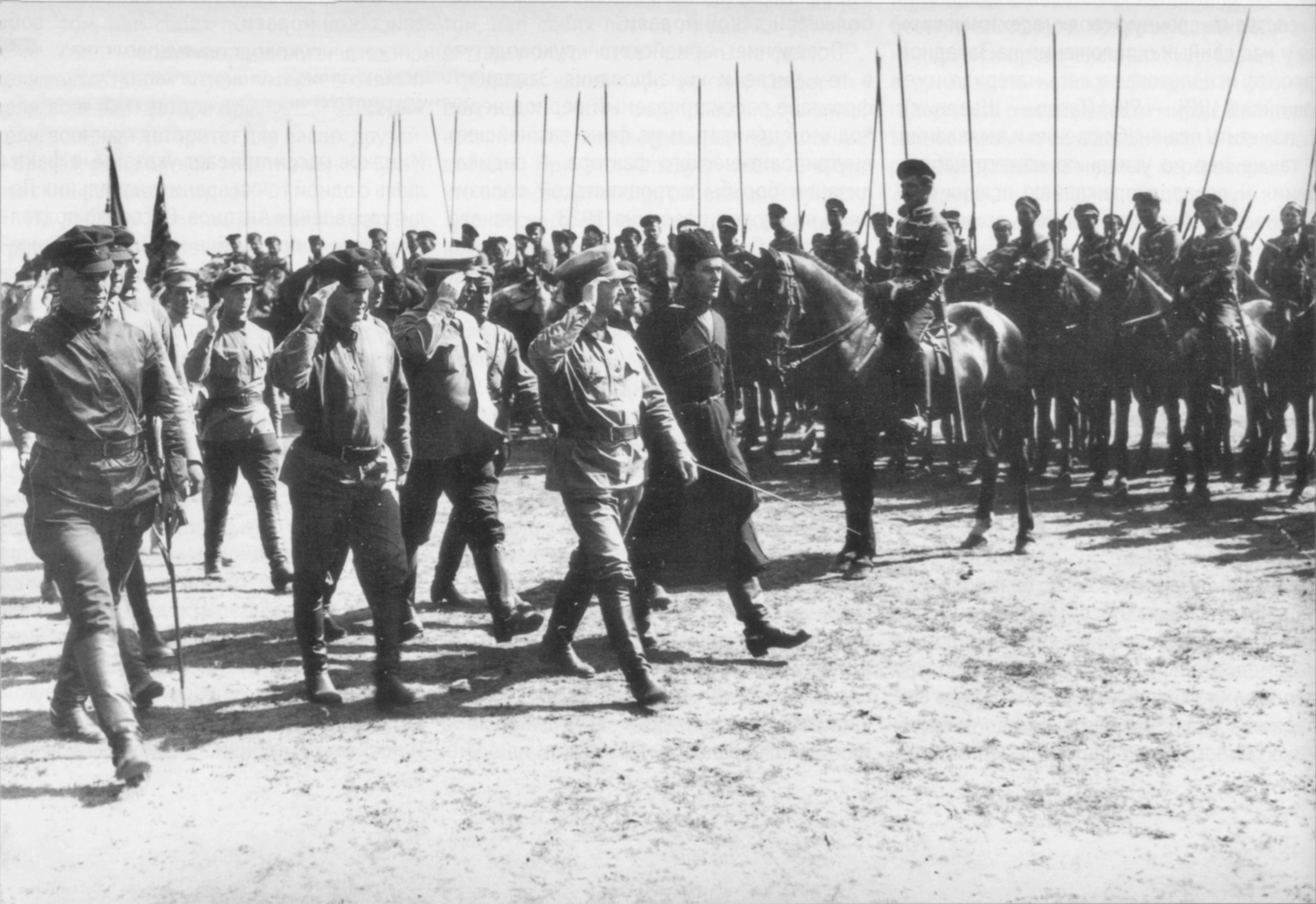
Commissar Trotsky and Commander Yegorov review the cavalry troops (1919): The troopers wear hussar uniforms including dolmans. The right most walking man wears the uniform of the Kuban Cossack Host.

Although most cavalry wore fairly unremarkable uniforms, this was not case for the Red Hussars, who scavenged from old Imperial storehouses for their colourful thrift. Foremost amongst these units was the Zavolzhskaya Brigade of Red Hussars of the 14th Cavalry Division otherwise known as Vatman's Red Hussars Brigade. The Brigade, consisting of three regiments, wore the parade uniforms of both the 1st Sumskoy (Note: Whilst Sumskoy is the name given here, the unit has also been referred to as the Sumy or Sumsky Hussars in some works.) and 3rd Elisavetgradsky Hussar regiments. This uniform consisted of a light blue dolman upon which were yellow tunic cords and brass buttons, the shoulder-knots – a tsarist indicator of rank – were removed; red chakchiry breeches with yellow piping down the sides; cavalry jackboots with the hussar rosette in brass on the fronts; peaked caps in light blue with yellow piping on the crown and band – the band's colour itself was scarlet for the 1st Sumskoy regiment and white for the 3rd Elisavetgradsky regiment. The peak of these caps was black leather and smaller than those of regular caps, often being worn crumpled in the fashion of the time. Instead of dolmans, commanders would wear the more conventional French tunics along with the proper rank insignia. Some of the Red Hussars, in lieu of red stars, would wear on their caps a metal badge consisting of a silver horseshoe behind two silver crossed sabres which in itself was superimposed by a gold horse's head. Regimental musicians would have worn gold lyres rather than stars as well. Some squadrons would also have had lances with two-colour pennants.

Although Vatman's men are the most well known to wear such uniforms, they were not the only ones. The 10th Kuban Cavalry Division's 55th 'Narva' Cavalry Regiment had a uniform which varied from Vatman's Brigade only in having white piping, tunic cords, and metal fittings as well as a yellow cap band which had all originally belonged to the 13th Narvsky Hussar regiment. Another unit was the 21st Rifle Division's Independent Cavalry Battalion which wore the orange caps and dolmans, blue cap bands, red breeches, and white piping and cords of the 15th Ukrainian Hussar Regiment – brown busbys with light blue bags and white metal chin-scales would also have been worn.

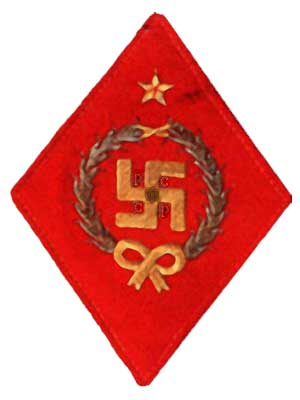
Sleeve patch of the 1st Kalmyk Cavalry Regiment – made up of one of Russia's Buddhist peoples.

=== Commissars ===
Army commissars wore much the same as red commanders with the exception of the 1918 and 1919 rank insignia. If a commissar wore a distinguishing mark, this would be in the form of a large red star edged gold on the left sleeve containing either the hammer and plough or the hammer and sickle.

=== General Staff ===
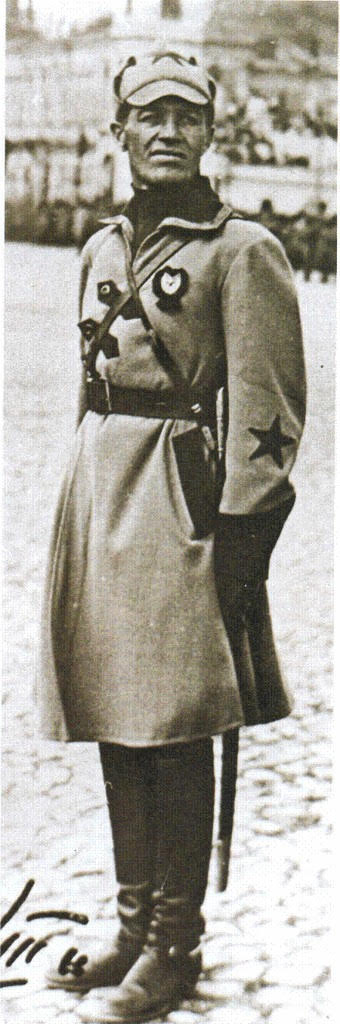
A General Staff Academy graduate (1919): He wears the pea green field kaftan and budenovka.

In 1919 the Red Army's General Staff received its own, rather eccentric, uniform. It consisted of a scarlet service cap and riding breeches, both piped yellow, originating from the old Lifeguard Hussar Regiment stockpile; a dark crimson 1919 issue tunic with black velvet chest tabs, cuffs, and left sleeve star; silver aiguillettes on the right shoulder and spurred jackboots. This garb was woefully unpopular with staff members, who saw it as pompous. Some refused to wear the crimson tunic and instead gave them away to the seamstressing of their wives to be made into ladies' jackets. Conveniently, the aiguillettes came to be 'short in supply'. The hat and breeches became somewhat popular however and would be worn alongside a khaki shirt with the previous black velvet affects if not with the crimson one. The service uniform also included a crimson 1919 issue greatcoat with black velvet collar, chest tabs, pocket flaps, cuffs, and sleeve star all piped light green.

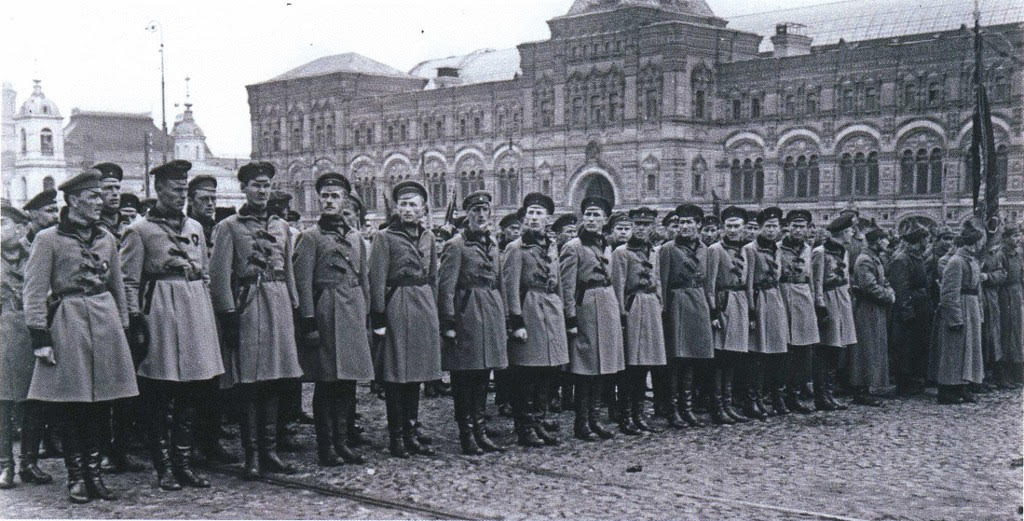
General Staff Academy graduates (1919): They wear the field kaftan but with service caps instead of budenovkas.

The field uniform added a knee-length, open-collared kaftan of high quality pea green material with black velvet collar, razgovory, pocket flaps, cuffs, and sleeve star, all piped crimson. Rows of metal edging topped with loops were sometimes worn on the collar and cuffs, 1–4 gold stripes for general officer equivalents and 3–4 silver stripes for field officer equivalents. A pea green budenovka with a black velvet star piped crimson and black velvet buttons would complete the ensemble.

=== Red Sotnia ===
Serving as both train crew and personal guard of Commissar of War Trotsky, the Red Sotnia's (or Red Hundred's) uniform was made up of distinctive red leathers. By 1919, Budenovkas, jackets, trousers, and jackboots all in red leather were worn as well as a badge worn on the left sleeve: a silver shield embossed with a steaming train imposed over the Sun's rays, a red streak across it in enamel reads 'Revvoyensoviet' whilst more enamel across the top states 'RSFSR', both in Cyrillic.

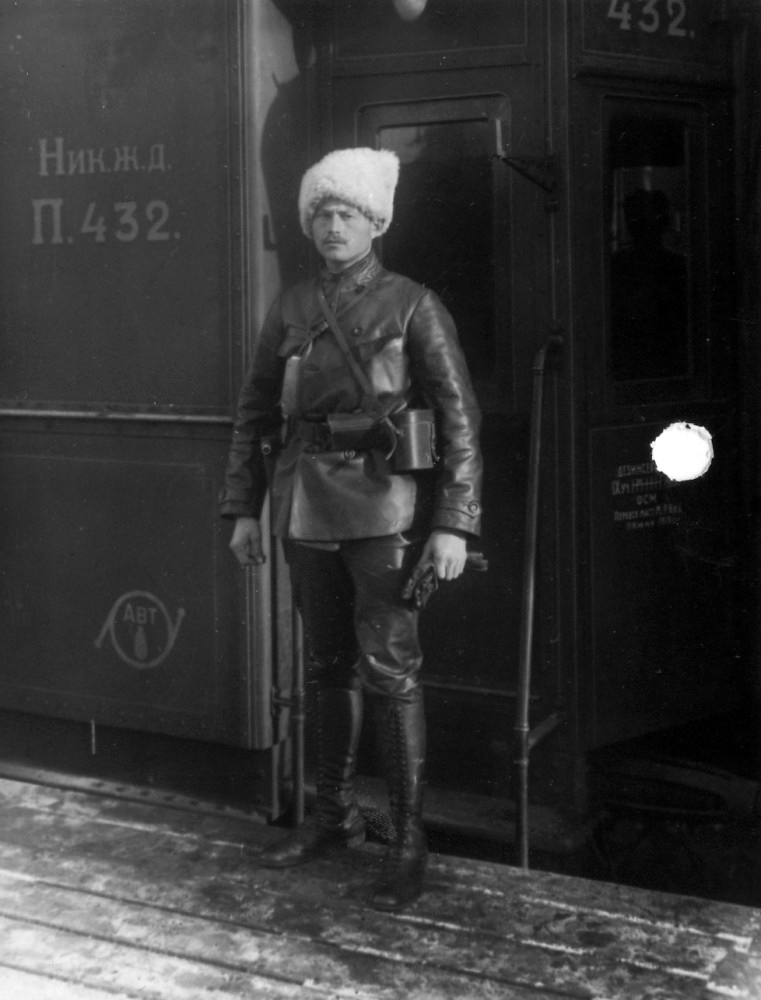
Rudolf Augustovich Peterson (1918-1920): He wears a white civilian papakha with an otherwise typical Red Sotnia uniform sans arm badge.

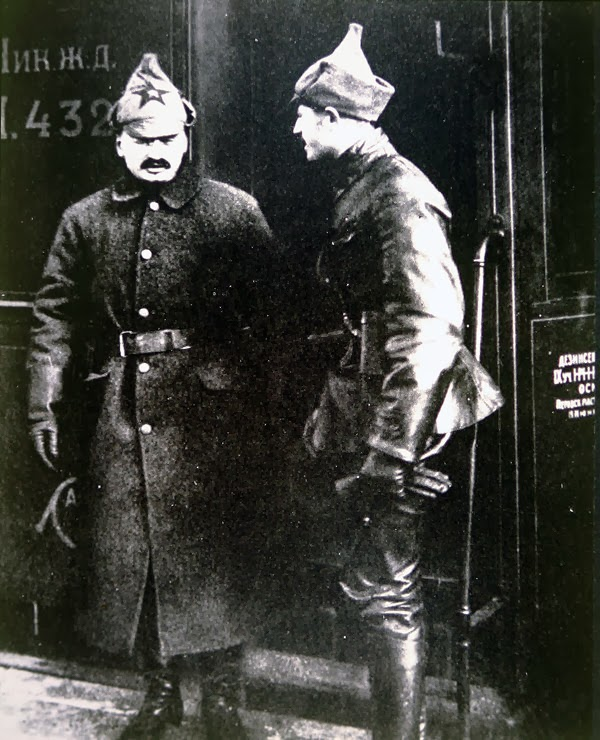
Commissar of War Leon Trotsky (left) with a member of the Red Sotnia (1918-1920).

=== Schools ===
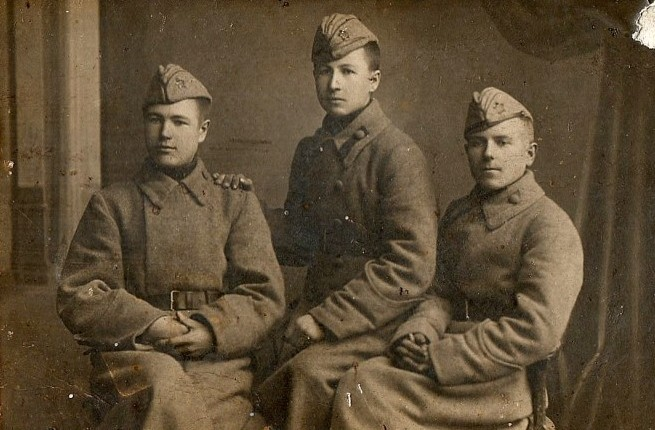
Red Army cadets (1919-1920): They wear cavalry greatcoats, possibly implying their belonging to a cavalry commander's school. Atypically, their caps are a simple khaki rather than the cadet's dark green. Cap badges are worn to one side.

Red cadets, continuing a theme, took from old stores to assemble their uniforms, although not without some modifications being made. The khaki side caps so abundant in warehouses became the standard headwear for cadets, now dyed dark green. Additionally, piping and a pill-shaped patch on the right side of the cap in branch-colour were added, with the pill having one or two brass buttons to fasten the black leather chin-strap that stretched across the top. As ever, the red star or an old metal shoulder badge was worn on the cap. Besides this, cadets wore standard-issue uniforms but of higher quality, with any greatcoats being worn typically having collar patches, upon which were brass buttons and branch badges.

Some schools, especially those stationed in Petrograd, were required to participate in regular parades. In these formative years of the Soviet state, such units would make use of the parade uniforms of the old lifeguard regiments and military academies, however these were not always supplied as full sets with jarring combinations being on display. The ornate Tsarist shakos and czapkas worn in such ensembles would be suitably sovietised with red stars and paint in place of eagles.

Due to the Red Army's constant shortages, suitable footwear was in short number for cadets leading to cases of those on field exercises borrowing the shoes and boots of those who remained within barracks – medical patients, orderlies, and the like.

==== Cavalry Commander's schools (1918–1920) ====
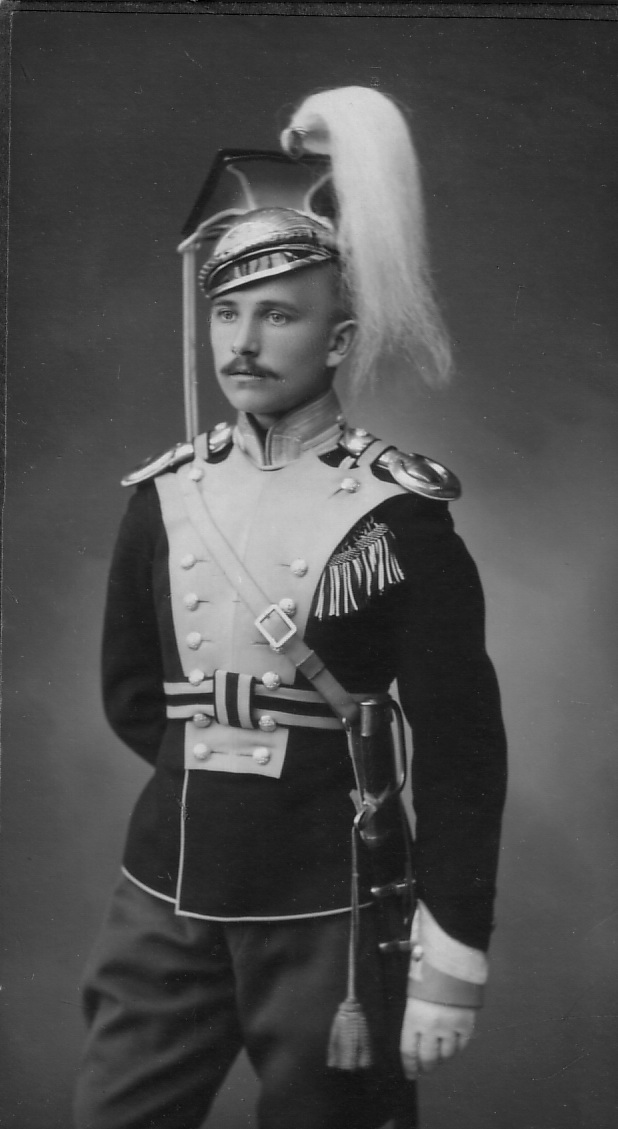
The pupils of the Tver school wore much the same uniform as its previous occupants as pictured here, though with shoulder straps removed and red stars added.

Cadets of the 1st Tver Soviet Cavalry Commander's School were known to wear the opulent 'gala' uniform of imperial cadets of the old Tverskoy Cavalry College. This consisted of a black czapka with light blue and silver accents and a white plume; a dark green tunic with a light blue cloth panel at front and silver buttons and stitching at cuff and collar; a dark green and light blue striped belt and blue breeches tucked into riding boots that cover the knee. This was not their everyday wear however: a peaked or peakless service cap with dark green band and light blue crown with dark green piping was worn; khaki gymnastiorka and sharovari breeches; cavalry jackboots; and a cavalry greatcoat with light blue collar patches piped dark green.

Another example of cavalry cadets wearing such fanciful garb would be the Life Guard Hussar Regiment uniforms worn by attendants of the 1st Petrograd Soviet Cavalry Commander's School. This took the form of a brown busby with white plume, a scarlet dolman, blue breeches, and a white pelisse all with yellow cords – sabretaches were discarded.

==== Infantry Commander's School (1918–1920) ====
Once graduated, the cadets of this school would shed their uniforms for a new one: a commander's light grey peaked cap, black gymnastiorka, blue, blue-grey, or khaki breeches, and jackboots. Chevrons with the school or branch emblem were sometimes worn on the left sleeve.

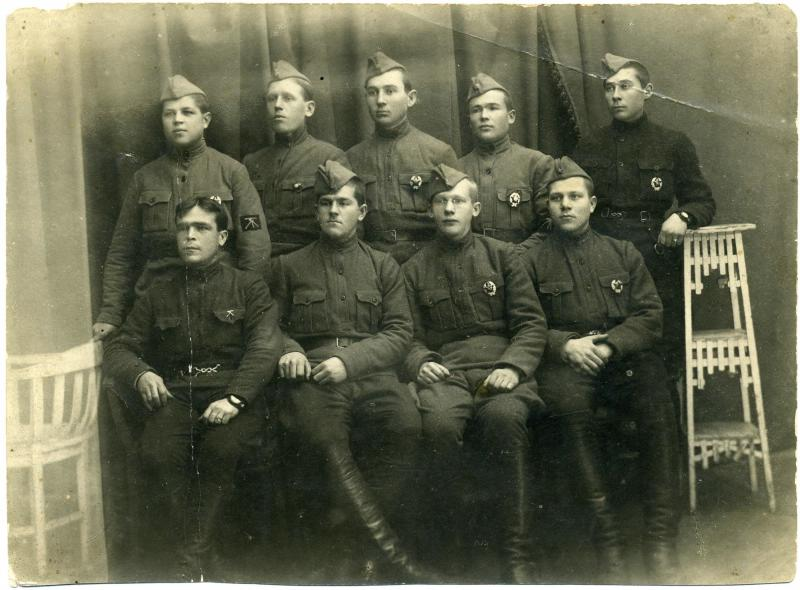
Cadets of the Kremlin Machine Gun School of Command Staff (1920): Their caps lack both the piping and the green fabric of the regulation cadet uniform. Many of them wear the M1918 Red Army badge on the left breast, whilst one cadet (front and far left) wears a Tsarist machine gunner's shoulder board badge instead.

=== Other unit uniforms ===
==== Taman Army (1918–1920) ====
The Taman Army was formed in south Russia in 1918 and so too would its distinctive mark later that year. The Army's chevron was introduced in September 1918, no later than the 26th, by Yepifan Kovtyukh for his 1st Column – one of three in the army. On 10 October, now commander of the whole army, Kovtyukh had the chevron apply to all columns. The patch was meant to commemorate the army's breakout through enemy lines and was, unlike in many other units at this time, very strict in its presentation – commanders would not allow any unofficial modifications. The chevron was officially '22.3 cm long and 4.5 cm wide'.

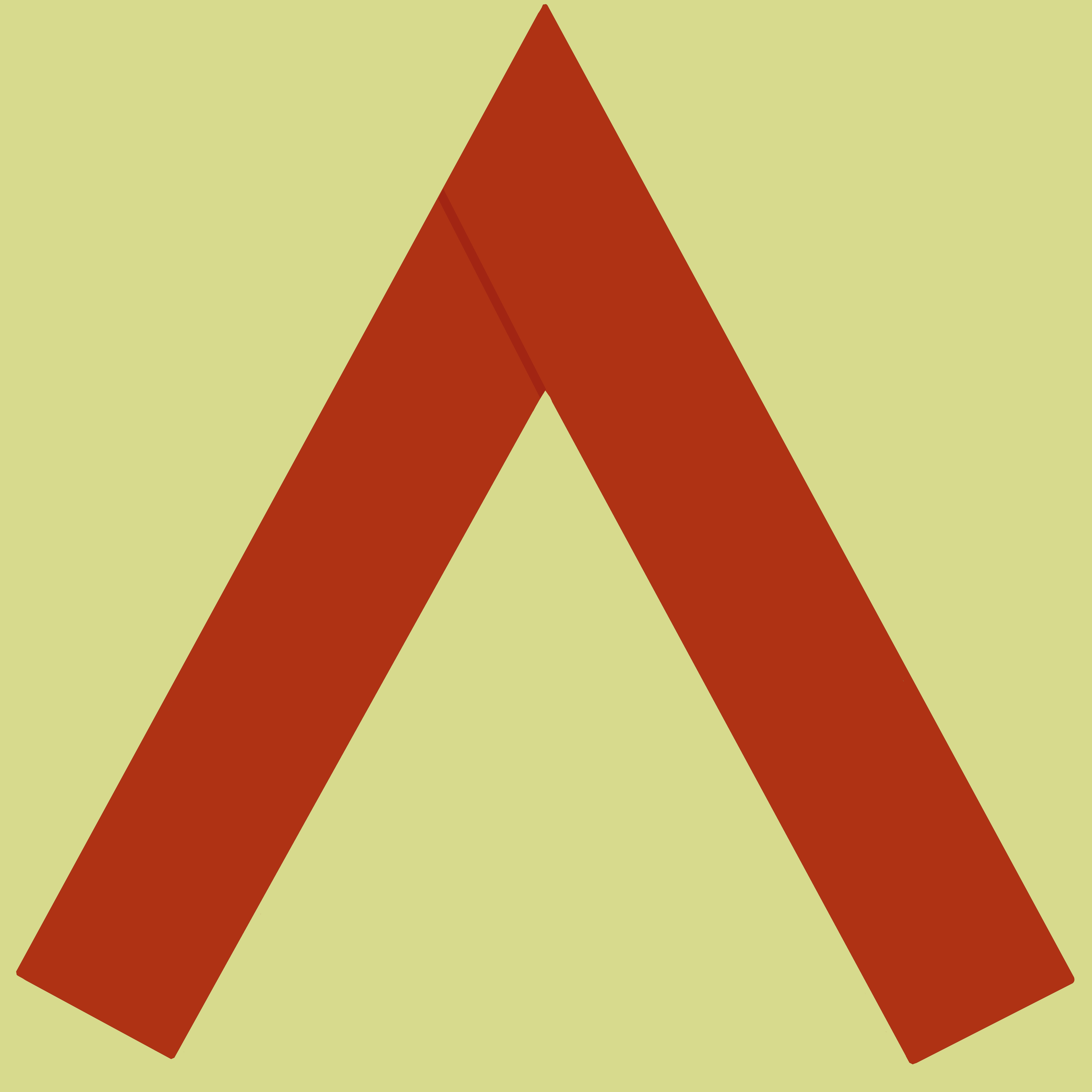
Sleeve patch of the Taman Army

== Allied uniforms ==
There were several forces during the Civil War that were, at least nominally, independent from the Red Army and had the uniforms to prove it. Others were forced into its ranks by circumstance yet retained much of their old looks. In either case their uniforms were made to be suitably soviet.

=== Estonian Red Army (1919) ===
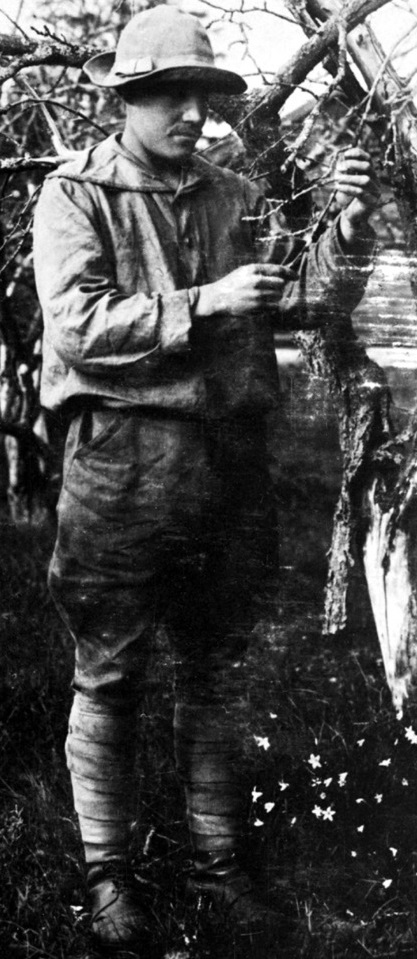
Estonian Red Army infantryman (1919): He wears the Estonian hat and shirt, tucked into his trousers in the Estonian style, with ankle boots and puttees. Notice how he wears the hat compared to the men in the other photo.

Formed to give the invasion of Estonia the veneer of a civil conflict, the Estonian Red Army was given its own "national" uniform made from cloth captured at Narva on 28 November 1918. This consisted of a slouch hat with a red bow and a shirt much like the gymnastiorka but with a red-edged sailor's collar, both in a light greenish-khaki – the uniform was otherwise typical Red Army fair.

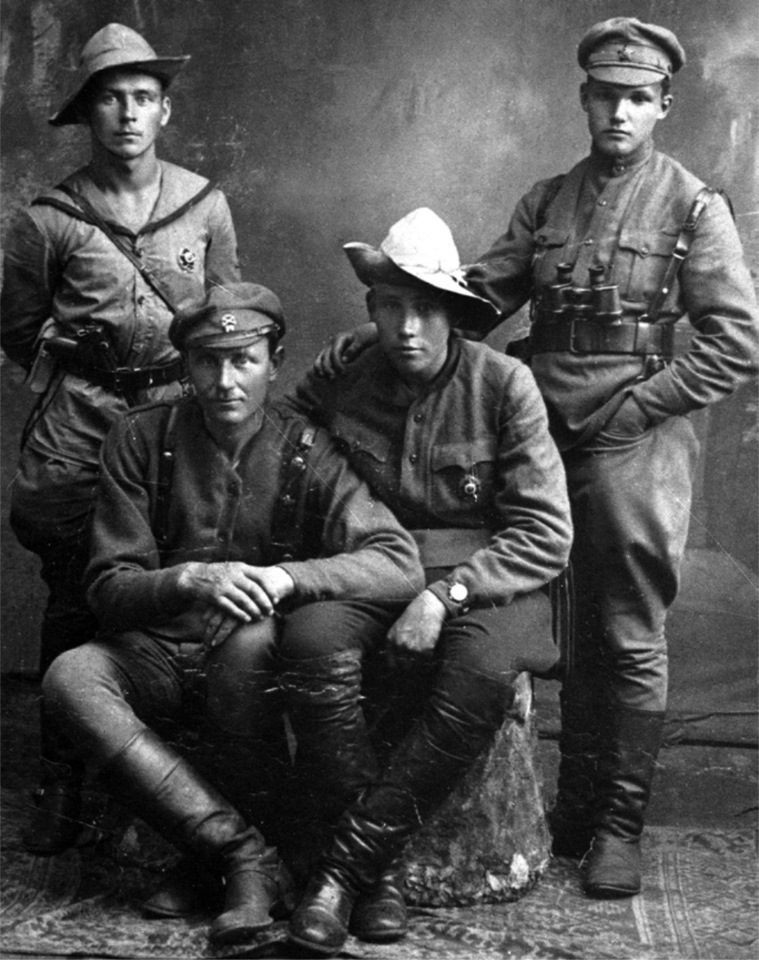
Members of an Estonian Red Army artillery battery (1919): These men, likely officers based on the pistol, watch, and binoculars, show a good variety of uniform in the Estonian Red Army. The left most wears the full Estonian set while his opposite wears a typical uniform for the greater Red Army. A combination can be seen among the two sitting figures who have tucked in their gymnastiorka collars to resemble their comrade with one wearing a slouch hat. The other sitting man wears an old crossed artillery badge on his cap and Red Army chest badges can be seen though with a device attached, possibly some kind of Estonian cockade. Also take note of the riding boots and stirrups.

=== People's Revolutionary Army (1920–1922) ===
Cap badge of the People's Revolutionary Army

People's Revolutionary Army sleeve patch of the rank of starshina (equivalent to a sergeant major) without branch insignia

'The army of the Far Eastern Republic, a sort of Bolshevik backed buffer state against the Japanese interventionists, was geographically quite separate from the Red Army and so had to go through the pains of procuring its own uniforms. This was of course primarily Russian but with some American and Japanese items also seeing use.

The People's Revolutionary Army was also known to have its own distinct insignia: On the cap was worn a golden star containing a horizontally split red over blue circle upon which was a crossed pickaxe and anchor symbolizing the union of miners and sailors. On the left sleeve a diamond patch was also worn, also split horizontally red over blue. On the red was a rising sun with golden rays containing the red Cyrillic letters 'НРА' whilst on the blue would be red rank stripes or upwards pointing chevrons and a branch emblem in the bottom corner. These badges could be piped, for example in white for staff officers, with non-regulation black piping also being seen.

Rank insignia of the People's Revolutionary Army
Rank	Equivalent	Description
Soldier	Private	Blank
Otdelyonniy komandir	Corporal	One red stripe
Pomkomvzvoda	Sergeant	Two red stripes
Starshina	Company sergeant major	Three red stripes
Komvzvoda	Lieutenant	One wide red stripe
Komroty	Captain	One wide red stripe over one regular red stripe
Kombat	Major	One wide red stripe over two regular red stripes
Kompolka	Colonel	One extra wide red stripe
Kombrig	Brigadier	One red chevron
Nachdiv	Major general	Two red chevrons
Komandarm	Lieutenant general	One wide red chevron over one regular red chevron
Komfronta	General	One extra wide red chevron
Military Commissar		A red five pointed star (two points up and one down) containing a gold book and quill with the golden letters 'ЕК' beneath

=== Red Ukrainian Galician Army (1920) ===
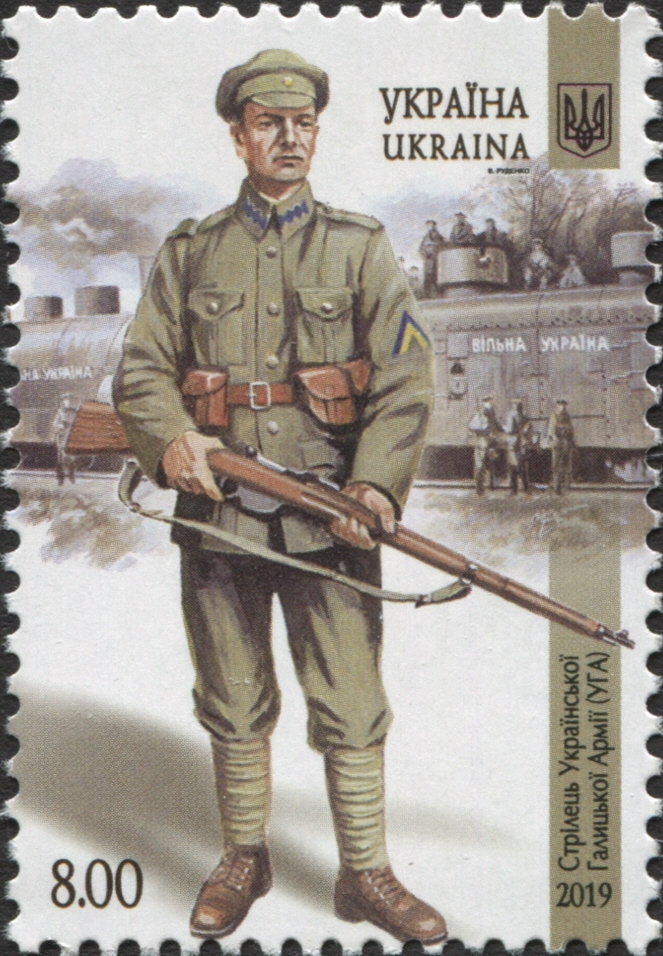
A stamp of a UGA soldier. He wears the 1919 uniform in green-brown with a typical field cap rather than the Austro-Hungarian style.

Established in formerly Austro-Hungarian Galicia, the Ukrainian Galician Army would fight for its independence even against the other Ukrainians to its east. After a Polish invasion, an alliance with the destroyed AFSR, and a typhus pandemic that reduced them to just 5,000 men, the UGA was forced to align itself with the Reds in 1920 – now christened the Red Ukrainian Galician Army (chUHA).

The chUHA continued to wear much the same uniform as it did in 1919. That year a grey-green uniform, including an Austro-Hungarian style cap though with a V cut into the cloth flap at the front, was introduced but due to shortages green-brown cloth was also used and old Russian and Austro-Hungarian uniforms could still be seen all the while. The only real change was the removal of all insignia except the trident cap badge which had a red rosette placed behind it – another source says that red stars were used however.

== Gallery ==
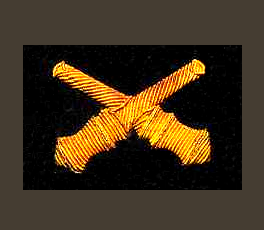
An example of a non-regulation artillery sleeve patch consisting of gold embroidery on black cloth. Such badges were often based on Tsarist insignia, in this case the artillery branch's crossed cannons.

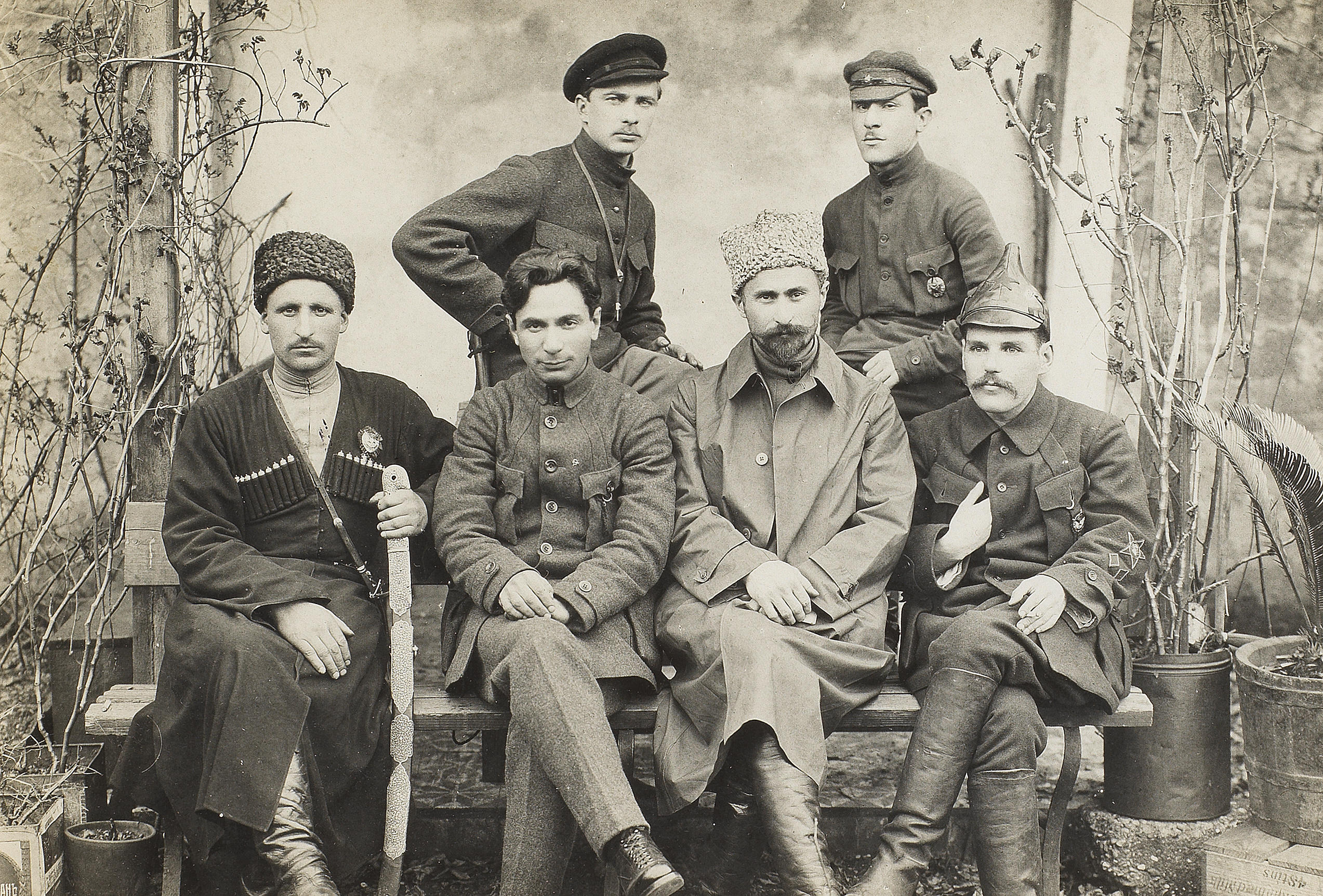
Two division commanders and a commissar sitting far left, far right, and centre left respectively (1921): Note how even amongst senior commanders insignia is varied or lacking: the first commander wears only an Order of the Red Banner, an award, to denote his allegiance whilst the commissar a seat along wears nothing but a small hammer and sickle pin.

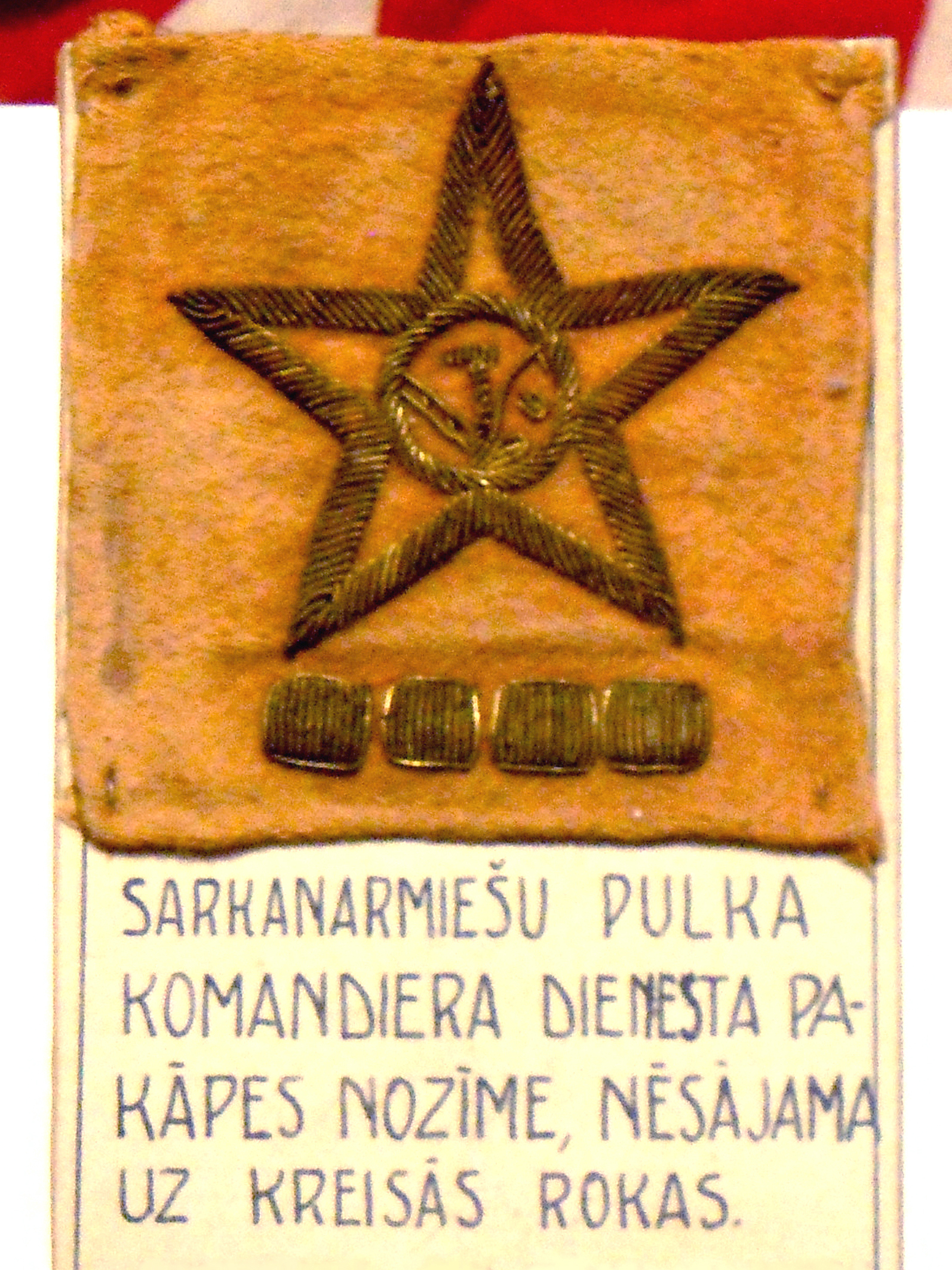
An example of an unofficial variation of the 1919 rank insignia. The four squares make this the patch of a regiment commander. Take note of the use of the hammer and plough rather than the hammer and sickle.
