= Northern Caucasus Operation (1918–1919) =

1918 battle during the Russian Civil War

- Frontlines in Summer 1918
Date	December 1918 – March 1919
Location	Northern Caucasus
Result	White Army victory
Territorial changes	Red Army retreats from the Caucasus, but holds Astrahan

Belligerents
Red Army Caspian-Caucasian Front; Dagestan rebels	Armed Forces of South Russia

Commanders and leaders
Mikhail Svechnikov; Mikhail Levandovsky	Pyotr Wrangel; Andrei Shkuro; Viktor Pokrovsky; Anton Denikin

Strength
Unknown	Unknown

Casualties and losses
25,000 killed	Unknown

The Northern Caucasus Operation was fought between the White and Red Armies during the Russian Civil War between December 1918 and March 1919. The White Army captured the entire Northern Caucasus. The Red Army withdrew to Astrahan and the Volga Delta.

== Prelude ==
In summer and autumn 1918, the Red Army had been defeated in the Second Kuban Campaign and Ekaterinodar, Novorossiysk, Maykop, Armavir and Stavropol were lost. Red Army commander Ivan Sorokin rebelled against the Revolutionary Military Council of the North Caucasus, shot several of its members and fled, but was arrested and shot without trial by a regiment commander of the Taman army.

After the loss of Stavropol on November 15, 1918, the forces of the Taman Army and the former Sorokin's army were consolidated into the 11th Red Army, which held the Zavetnoye-Petrovskoye-Remontnoye-Priyutnoye-Dry Buivola-Oak-Kursavka-Vorovskolesskaya-Kislovodsk-Nalchik front line, which roughly ran north–south. It was joined by the weak 12th Red Army which held the front line from Grozny over Kizlyar to the Terechnoye station, which ran west–east. On December 8, 1918, both of these armies became part of a separate Caspian-Caucasian Front under command of Mikhail Svechnikov. The Front headquarters were located in Astrakhan, which wasn't ideal, as there were 400 km of desert between the front and the headquarters.

== The campaign ==
On December 19, 1918, the Caspian-Caucasian Front received orders from Moscow to attack. The 11th Army was to launch an offensive against the Armavir -Tikhoretsk line held by the White troops of Denikin, while the 12th Army was to attack the Makhachkala - Derbent line with the support of the Astrakhan-Caspian Military Flotilla.

On 2 January 1919, V. Kruze's Eleventh Army attacked Batalpashinsk, but the troops of the 11th Army were not able to carry out the assigned tasks, which was poorly planned. On 6 January, Wrangel counterattacked taking Blagodarny. The Taman Army counter-attacked twice, but were unable to retake the town. The Eleventh Army's 4th division, withdrew partly to Elista, and partly to Yashkul. When two brigades of the 3rd Infantry Division also withdrew in divergent directions, the White Army was able to transform the initial success of its counterattack into a general defeat of the 11th Army. According to Peter Kenez, "From this point on, the disintegration of the Eleventh army was remarkably rapid."Kislovodsk and Piatigorsk were taken on January 20, Grozny on February 5 and Vladikavkaz on February 10.

The 12th Army was also forced to conduct defensive battles in the districts of Kizlyar and west of Guryev. The defeat of the 11th Army made the 12th Army retreated towards the region of Astrakhan.
The Red Army, already badly organized and poorly disciplined, had also been decimated by a typhus epidemic. General Avtonomov was one of its victims. General Wrangel was also infected, but survived.

On February 4, 1919, the Stavropol Front was created to defend Astrakhan. In February 1919, the troops of the Front managed to secure Astrakhan and the mouth of the Volga and to prevent the union of Denikin's troops with the Ural white Cossacks. In March, the Caucasian-Caspian Front of the Red Army was disbanded, and the 11th and 12th Armies were consolidated into one, the 11th Army (second formation).

== See also ==
- Bibliography of the Russian Revolution and Civil War
- Outline of the Russian Revolution and Civil War
- Index of articles related to the Russian Revolution and Civil War
- The "Russian" Civil Wars, 1916–1926: Ten Years That Shook the World
- Russia in Flames: War, Revolution, Civil War, 1914–1921
- Russia in Revolution: An Empire in Crisis, 1890 to 1928
- Russia: Revolution and Civil War, 1917—1921
- The Russian Revolution: A New History
