= Ataman House (Novocherkassk) =

Coordinates: 47.2503°N 40.0540°E

- Дом атамана
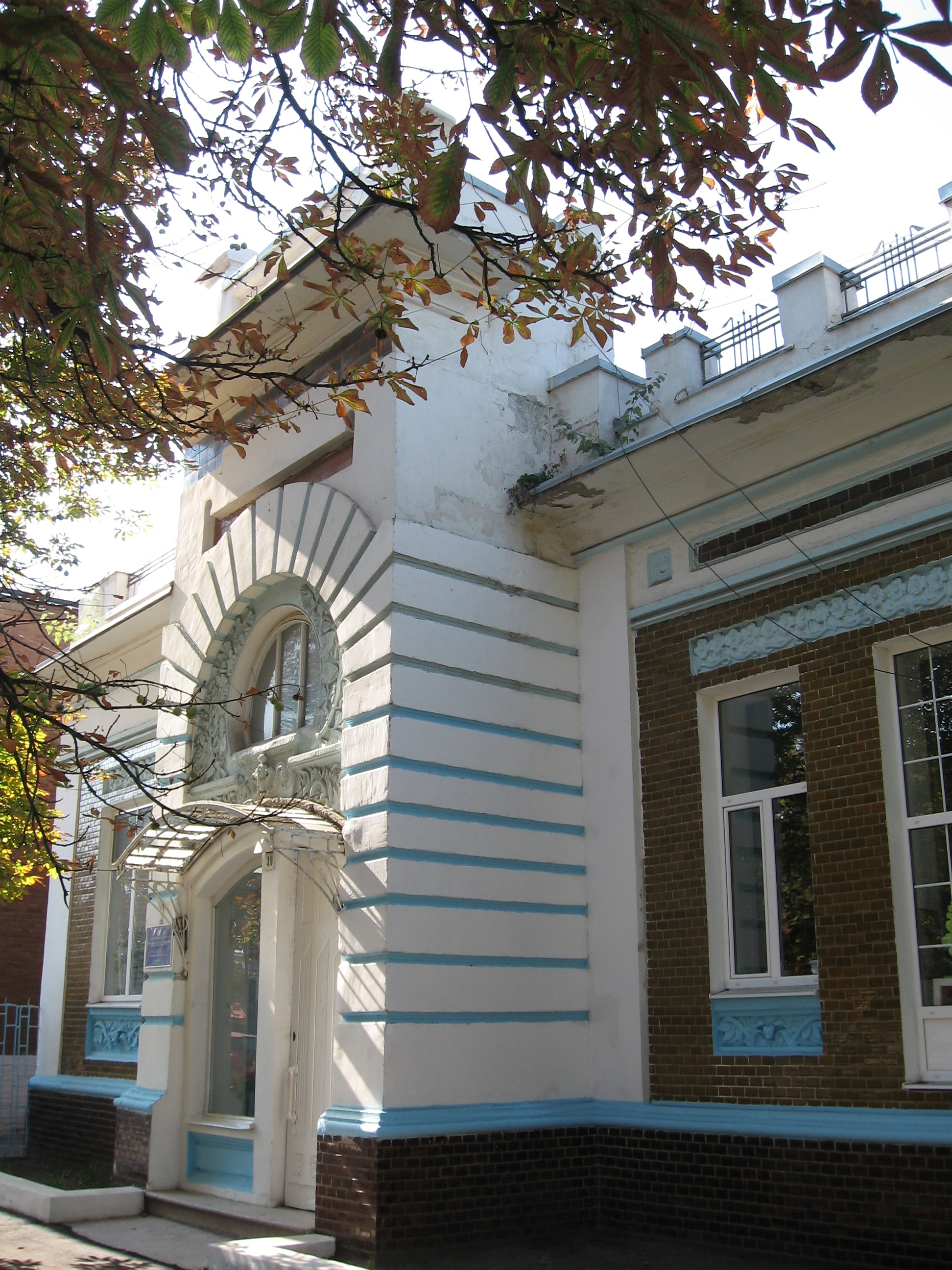
- Established: 1907
- Location: Novocherkassk, Rostov Oblast, Russia.
- Type: Mansion

The Ataman House (Russian: Дом атамана) is a mansion and an architectural monument in the city of Novocherkassk, Rostov Oblast, Russia, that was built in 1907. It is also officially declared as an object of cultural heritage of Russia.

== Description ==
Ataman House was constructed in 1907. Although Ataman Palace in Novocherkassk was the official residence where Cossack Atamans spent a lot of their working time, it was also necessary to construct a building for their private needs. Such an accommodation was the Ataman House on Moskovskaya Street, 49.

The Ataman House was built in the Art Nouveau style. The author of the project used the ornamental inserts and frames for the decoration of the facade. The main entrance is shifted from the central axis and is represented in the form of a rustic arch with a semicircular shaped window; on the both sides there is an ornament in the form of a thin plant ligature. On top of the front entrance there is a wide cornice with an attic. The left and right sides of the house have a different number of windows which are decorated with woven ornament. The house is decorated with an iron canopy, and the gates separate the Ataman House from Kiryunin Mansion.

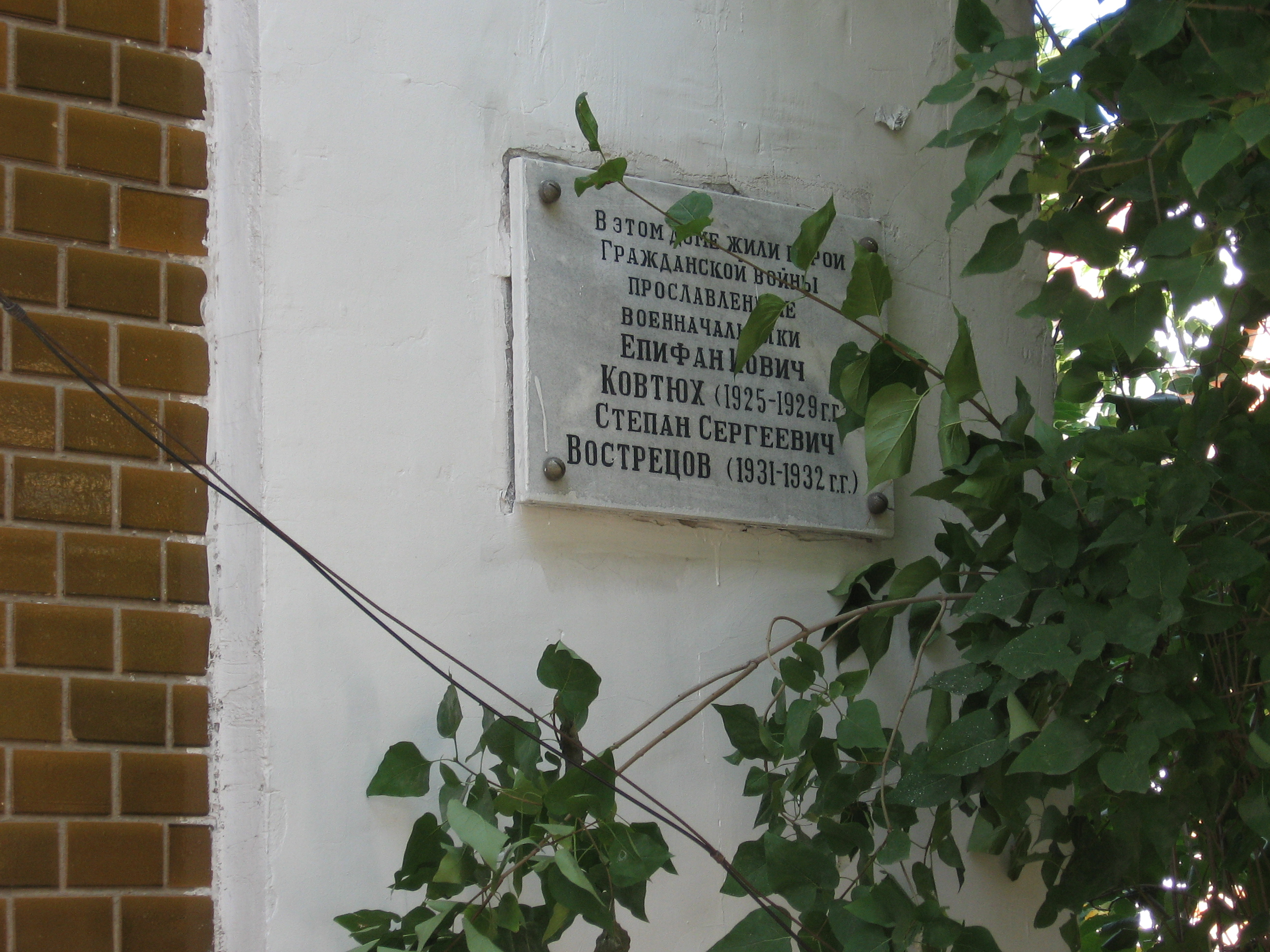
A memorial plaque dedicated to Soviet Army commanders Yepifan Kovtyukh and Stephan Vostretsov

After the end of World War II, in late 1940s, Ataman House was the apartment of Chief of Novocherkassk garrison. In different years, in Ataman House lived Soviet Army commanders Yepifan Kovtyukh and Stephan Vostretsov. Today the building houses a kindergarten.
