= Caspian-Caucasian Front =

Front of the Red Army during the Russian Civil War

The Caspian-Caucasian Front (Russian: Каспийско-Кавказский фронт) was a front of the Red Army during the Russian Civil War, formed on 8 December 1918 as a branch of the Southern Front. The Front was disbanded on 13 March 1919 and the troops transferred to form a separate 11th Army.

== Operations ==
The Caspian-Caucasian Front covered the Lower Volga, the Northern and Western coasts of the Caspian Sea and the Northern Caucasus. The Front headquarters were located in Astrakhan.

The task of the Front was to have the 11th Army continue the offensive against the Armavir -Tikhoretsk line held by the White troops of Denikin, while the 12th Army was to launch an offensive against Petrovsk - Derbent.

The troops of the 11th Army were not able to carry out the assigned tasks, as they were opposed by considerable enemy forces. The 12th Army was also forced to conduct defensive battles in the districts of Kizlyar and west of Guryev. In January 1919, the troops of the 11th Army were defeated in the Northern Caucasus Operation (1918–1919) and in February they retreated over the Manych River into the region of Astrakhan.

On February 4, 1919, the Stavropol Front was created to defend Astrakhan. In February 1919, the troops of the Front managed to secure Astrakhan and the mouth of the Volga and to prevent the union of Denikin's troops with the Ural white Cossacks.

The Front was disbanded on 13 March 1919.

== Composition ==
- 11th Army
- 12th Army
- Astrakhan-Caspian Military Flotilla

== Commanders ==
Commander :

- Mikhail Svechnikov (December 1918 - March 1919)

Chief of Staff :

- E.A. Nicolic

Members of the Revolutionary Military Council:

- Sergei Sachs
- Alexander Shliapnikov
- Konstantin Mekhonoshin
- N.A.Anisimov
