= Taman Army =

- Таманская армия
- Active: 27 August 1918–February 1919
- Country: RSFSR
- Allegiance: Bolsheviks
- Type: Field Army
- Size: 30,000 men
- Part of: Red Army
- Patron: Taman Peninsula
- Engagements: Russian Civil War

Commanders
- Notable commanders: Ivan Matveyev

The Taman Army (Russian: Таманская армия) was an armed group within the Red Army, operating in the south of Russia during the Russian Civil War. It existed from August 27, 1918 to February 1919. The name derives from the Taman Peninsula, where the army was formed.

== Formation ==
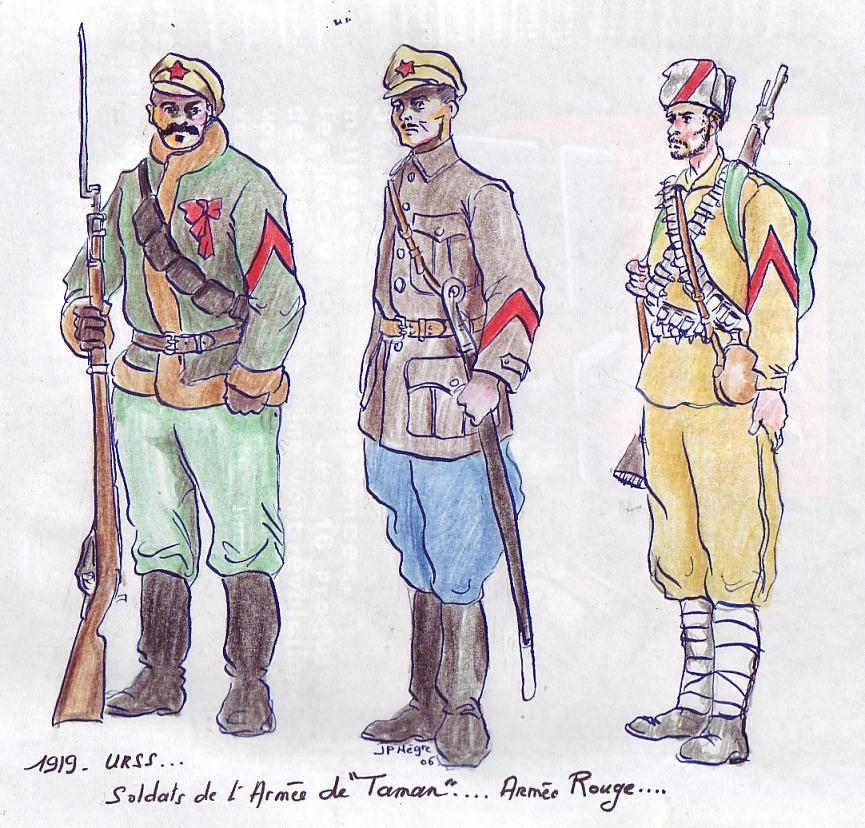
Uniforms in the Taman Army

The Taman Army was formed on August 27, 1918 in Gelendzhik on the Taman Peninsula. It counted some 30,000 men, mostly workers from Novorossiisk and sailors of ships of the Black Sea Fleet, who had chosen the Bolsheviks side and sunk their own ships in June 1918.

The Army was formed when the Bolsheviks in the Taman Peninsula found themselves isolated, because the German interventionist forces had taken the Crimea and Rostov-on-Don, and the White Army under Denikin had chased the Red army from their positions in Ekaterinodar on August 16 of that year. The units included I. I. Matveev's Ukrainian infantry regiment, E. O. Kovtiuh's group, and Sfonov's North Kuban Cavalry regiment.

Ivan Matveyev was elected as general commander of the Army, his deputy was Yepifan Kovtyukh, the chief of staff was G. N. Baturin and the commissioner N. K. Kicha.

It was decided to march in three columns from the Taman over Tuapse to the Northern Caucasus, to join the bulk of the Red Army there. The Taman Army was joined by a mass of some 25,000 refugees, which greatly impeded progress and actions. The tactical difficulties were great and the three columns were organized in the following way:

- the first column was in the vanguard securing the way against the army of Menshevik Georgia,
- the second column repulsed the attacks of the white Cossacks in the gorges and
- the third column led the rearguard battles against Denikin's troops.

== The March ==
On August 28 the first column occupied Arkhipo-Osipovka and on September 1 Tuapse, after defeating a Georgian infantry division, capturing armament and supplies. On September 2, the Army reached the main mountain range of the Caucasus near Khadyzhensk.

On 11 September, Matveev defeated a Volunteer Army force under Viktor Pokrovsky at Belorechensk, and evaded another force under the command of Kolosovskii.

On September 14, after regrouping with the second and third columns, the White defensive line North of Belorechensk was attacked, reaching Dondukovskaya on September 18, where the bulk of the Red Army of the Northern Caucasus was found.

== Merged with the 11th Army ==
The Taman Army was added to the Red Army of the Northern Caucasus, which was commanded by Ivan Sorokin. They fought together against the Volunteer Army and on September 26 the first column captured Armavir.

On 7 October, in Pyatigorsk, disagreements arose between Ivan Matveyev and Ivan Sorokin, and Sorokin ordered the arrest and execution of Matveyev.

The 3 columns of the Taman Army were reorganized into two infantry divisions, three of cavalry and one brigade of artillery.

In October–November, the Taman Army participated in the persistent fighting around Stavropol.

On December 3, the Army received the Red Honorary Revolutionary Flag of the RSFSR. Shortly after, the remains of the Army were reorganized as the 3rd Taman rifle division, which during the Northern Caucasus Operation (1918–1919), under pressure from the enemy's superior forces retreated to the Astrakhan region, where it was disbanded.

== Commanders ==
- Ivan Matveyev (August 27, 1918 – October 8, 1918)
- Yepifan Kovtyukh (12.10.1918 – October 22, 1918)
- M.V. Smirnov (October 23, 1918 – December 13, 1918)

== In literature ==
The March of the Taman Army, escaping encirclement by the enemy Whites, was romanticised in the novel The Iron Flood (1924) by Alexander Serafimovich.

== Sources ==
- March of the Taman Army in the Great Soviet Encyclopedia
- G. N. Baturin, Krásnaya Tamánskaya Armiya. Krasnodar, 1940.
- V. T. Sujorukov, XI Armiyav boyaj na Severnom Kavkaze i Nizhnei Volgue. Moscow, 1961.
- V. P. Gorlov, Geroicheski Pojod. Moscow, 2nd ed, 1967.
- Alexander Serafimovich, Zhelezni potok
