= Astrakhan-Caspian Military Flotilla =

The Astrakhan-Caspian Military Flotilla (Russian: Астрахано-Каспийская военная флотилия) was formed by the Bolsheviks in October 1918 for the purpose of defending the Lower Volga and northern parts of the Caspian Sea from the Volunteer Army. The existing flotilla, the so-called Military Fleet of the Astrakhan Krai had been operating in this region since April 1918 and consisted of 50 combat ships and 6 hydroplanes. It was reinforced by torpedo boats and submarines from Kronstadt in the fall of that year.

In December 1918, the flotilla was transferred under the command of the Caspian-Caucasian Front. In the early 1919, most of the Caspian Sea was under the control of the White Army and Allied intervention (21 armed steamships and 13 torpedo boats). In May 1919, the Astrakhan-Caspian Military Flotilla stormed ashore, captured a fort named Alexandrovsk, and then seized the Leila steamship, which carried General Anton Denikin's envoy General Alexei Grishin-Almazov (he was en route to Guryev to meet with Aleksandr Kolchak). In May–June 1919, the Astrakhan-Caspian Military Flotilla provided fire support to the units of the 10th and 11th Armies during the Tsaritsyn and Astrakhan defense. By this time, the flotilla had already had 3 cruisers (armed schooners), 6 destroyers, 3 torpedo boats, 4 submarines, 10 armed steamships, 7 fighters, 4 floating batteries etc.

On July 31 of 1919, the Astrakhan-Caspian Military Flotilla was merged with the Volga Military Flotilla to form the Volga-Caspian Military Flotilla.

== Commanders ==
- Sergei Sachs (13 october 1918 — 9 June 1919)
- Fyodor Raskolnikov (10 June 1919 - 31 July 1919)
