= Yepifan Kovtyukh =

Soviet corps commander

Yepifan Iovich Kovtyukh
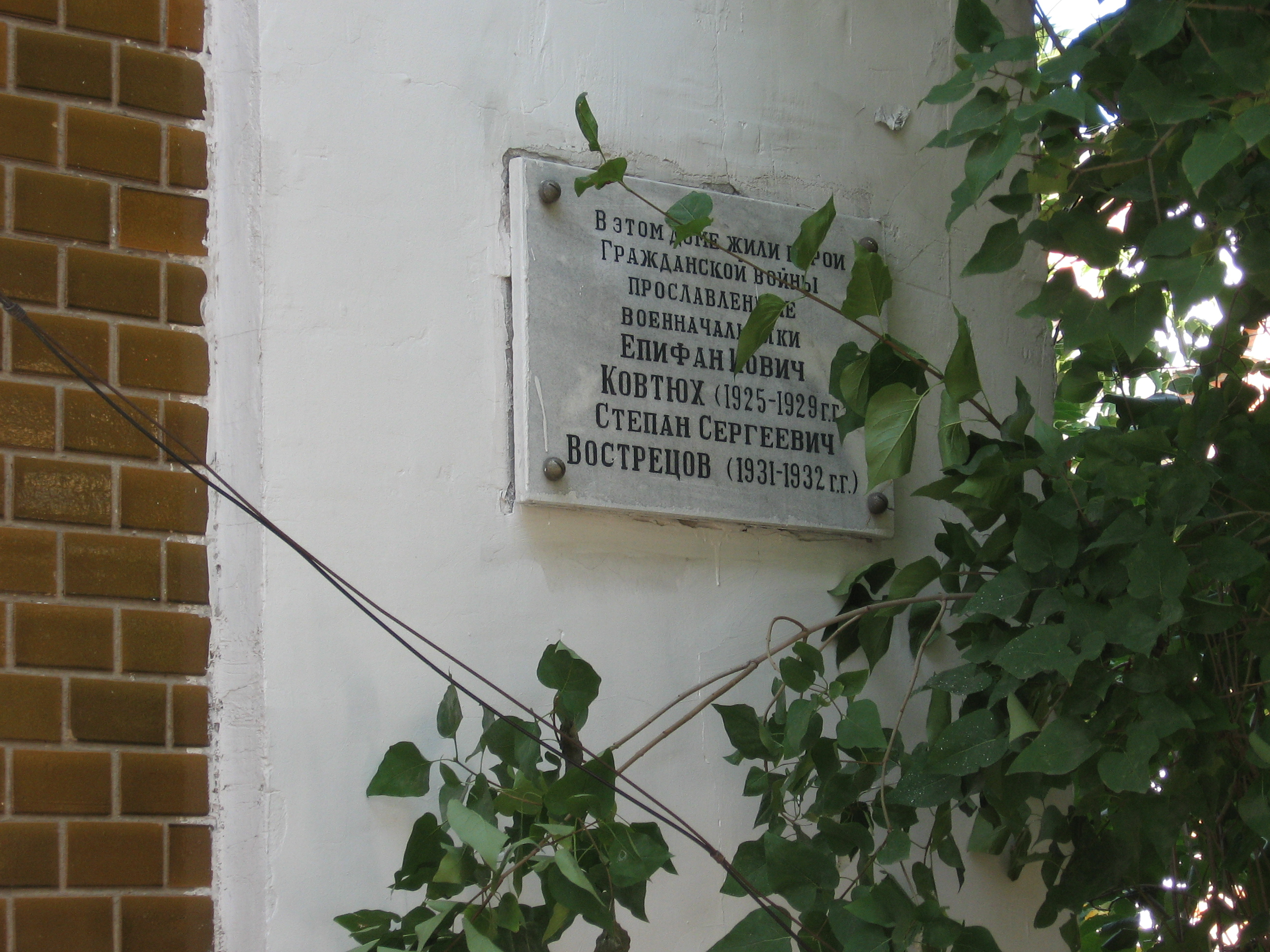
- Memorial plaque at Ataman House (Novocherkassk)
- Born: May 21, 1890; Kherson Governorate, Russian Empire
- Died: July 29, 1938 (aged 48) Soviet Union
- Allegiance: Russian Empire; Soviet Union
- Branch: Imperial Russian Army; Soviet Red Army
- Service years: 1911–1917 (Russian Empire); 1918–1937 (Soviet Union)
- Rank: Komkor
- Commands: Taman Army; 11th Rifle Corps
- Conflicts: World War I Russian Civil War

Yepifan Iovich Kovtyukh (Russian: Епифан Иович Ковтюх; Ukrainian: Єпіфан Іович Ковтюх; May 21, 1890 – July 29, 1938) was a Soviet corps commander. He was born in modern-day Ukraine.

He fought for the Imperial Russian Army in World War I before supporting the Bolsheviks. He was a recipient of the Cross of St. George and the Order of the Red Banner. He commanded the 11th Rifle Corps from January 1930 to June 1936. During the Great Purge, he was arrested by the NKVD on August 10, 1937, and his name appeared on Stalin's execution list of July 26, 1938. He was executed three days later.

After the death of Joseph Stalin, he was rehabilitated on February 23, 1956.

He is remembered on a plaque at Ataman House in Novocherkassk alongside Stephan Vostretsov. Ataman House was the apartment of the Chief of Novocherkassk garrison and in was, for a time, the place of residence of both men.

Military offices
Preceded by	Commander of the 11th Rifle Corps; January 1930 – June 1936	Succeeded by
