= 11th Army (RSFSR) =

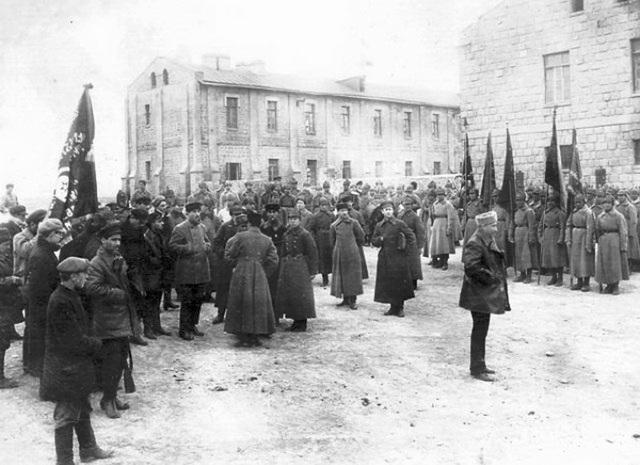
Red Army in Baku, Azerbaijan Democratic Republic in May 1920

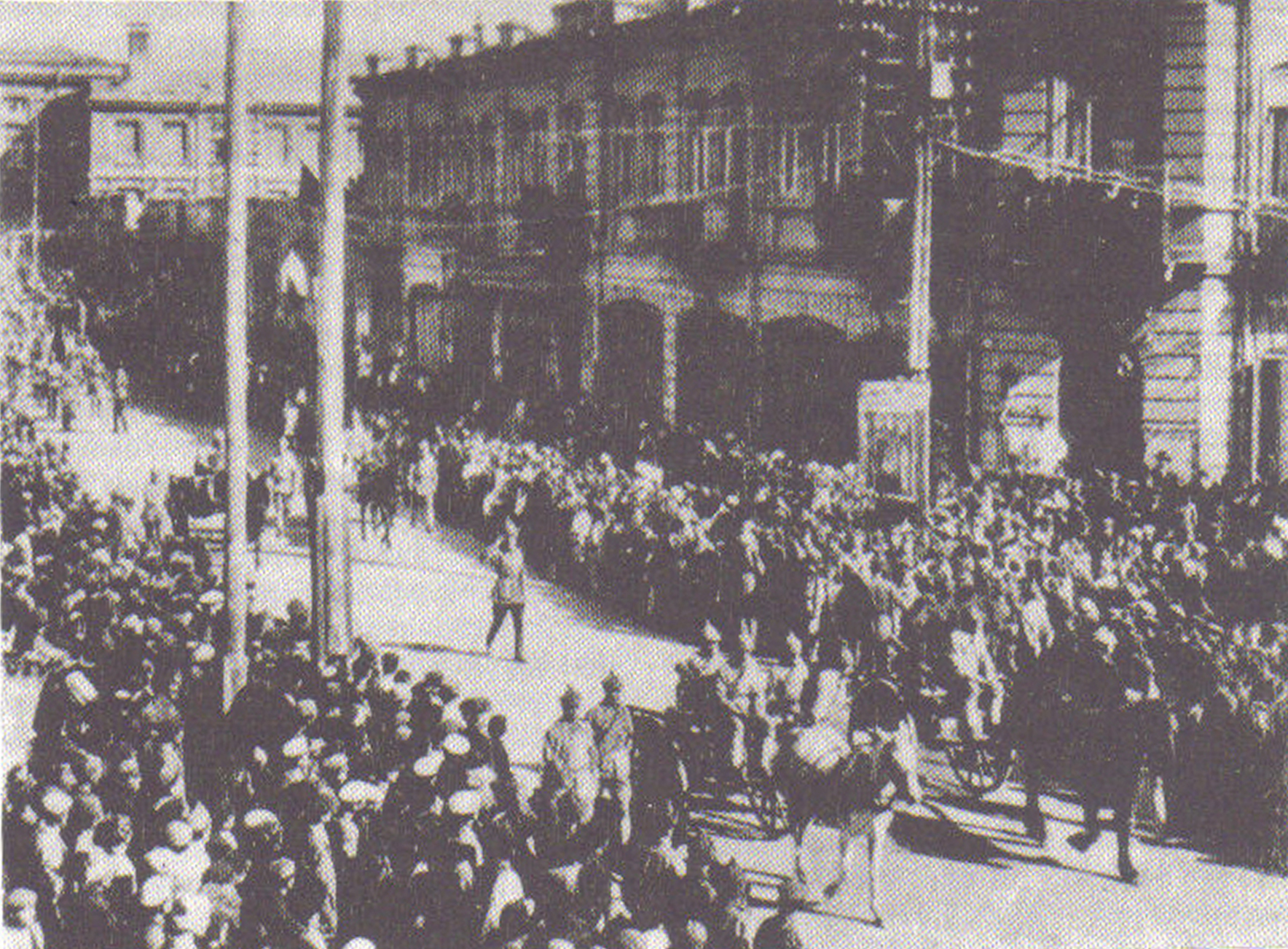
The 11th Red Army marching down a street in Yerevan, the capital of the First Republic of Armenia on November 29, 1920.

The 11th Army was a field army of the Red Army during the Russian Civil War, which fought on the Caspian-Caucasian Front. It took a prominent part in the sovietization of the three republics of the southern Caucasus in 1920–21, when Azerbaijan, Armenia, and Georgia were brought within the orbit of Soviet Russia.

== Russian Civil War ==
Since the Russian Republic's Caucasus Front (April 1917 - March 1918) dissolved, it did not have a true successor organization.
The Army of the North Caucasus, which was renamed 11th Army on October 3, 1918, constituted the main army of the Russian Soviet Federative Socialist Republic in the area during the Russian Civil War. During the Russian Civil War the 11th Army fought against the White troops of General Anton Denikin's Volunteer Army in the western part of the North Caucasus. It was the main strength of the Caspian-Caucasian Army Group. In January 1919, the front of 200 miles held by the Red troops along the Caucasus foothills and South Russian steppes was cut into two by the White forces in the Northern Caucasus Operation (1918–1919), which resulted in the panic flight of the 11th Red Army.

According to Peter Kenez, "The raging typhus epidemics greatly contributed to the misery of the soldiers; during the winter of 1918-1919 fifty thousand men became ill. The sick, the hungry, and the demoralized gave themselves up by the tens of thousands. The Whites captured large stores of weapons and the Eleventh army ceased to exist."

On 27 April 1920 the 11th Army took Baku and Azerbaijan Democratic Republic collapsed. The Bolsheviks then established the Azerbaijan Soviet Socialist Republic, as a Soviet republic in May 1920. This was the first country in the South Caucasus that the Bolsheviks seized control of. Taking advantage of its quarrels with neighboring Armenia, the 11th Army had little difficulty in initially sovietizing Azerbaijan. Although it soon was embroiled in a fierce anti-Soviet insurgency, the army remained poised to advance into the two remaining republics, Armenian and Georgia.

For the time being, however, the authorities in Moscow ordered the army to stand down while negotiations between Russia and Armenia were being carried out. In that brief span the Red Army did aid Armenian communists fighting against the Armenian government in the Ijevan region of Armenia.

In September–November 1920 Armenia and in February–March 1921, Georgia were invaded and brought under Bolshevik control.

Having conquered the whole of Transcaucasia, the 11th Army was dissolved on May 29, 1921 and replaced by the Independent Caucasus Army.

== Commanders ==
The commanders of the Army of the North Caucasus were :

- Alexei Ivanovich Avtonomov (25 January - 28 May 1918)
- Karl Kalnin (28 May - 2 August 1918),
- Ivan Sorokin (3 August - 3 October 1918)

The head of the 11th Army's Revolutionary Military Council was Sergo Ordzhonikidze.
The military leaders of the 11th Army were

- Ivan Sorokin (3 - 27 October 1918)
- Ivan Fedko (17 - 30 November 1918)
- Vladimir Kruse (30 November 1918 - 3 January 1919)
- Mikhail Levandovsky (3 January - 13 February 1919)
- N.A. Żdanow (20 March - 3 June 1919)
- A. Smirnow (3 - 10 June 1919)
- V.P. Raspopov (14 August — 26 September 1919),
- J.P. Butyagin (26 September — 19 December 1919),
- Matvei Vasilenko (19 December 1919 — 29 March 1920),
- Mikhail Levandovsky (29 March — 12 July 1920),
- Matvei Vasilenko (26 July — 12 September 1920),
- Anatoly Gekker (19 September 1920 — 29 May 1921).

Military decisions were supervised by the Army's Council of War. Its members were in 1921: Sergey Kirov, Valerian Kuybyshev, J.P. Butyagin, K.A. Mekhonoshin, Sokolov, J.I. Vesnik, Lukin, B.D. Mikhailov, Kvirkeliya, S.S. Eliava and P.I. Kushner.

By 1921, the 11th Red Army is characterized by the modern French historian Marie Broxup as "a purely Russian army led by Russian commanders and Russian political cadres." In May 1921 the army lost its name and was integrated into the Caucasian Front, later part of the North Caucasus Military District.
