= M School =

M School was an "espionage academy run by the Red Army", c. 1920s.

Two of its notable attendees were Wilhelm Zaisser and Ernst Wollweber, who later became very influential in the intelligence activities of East Germany and West Germany in the Cold War. It is also noted that Nikolai Yezhov was influential in its operation.
