= SS Crown Arun =

German-built cargo steamship

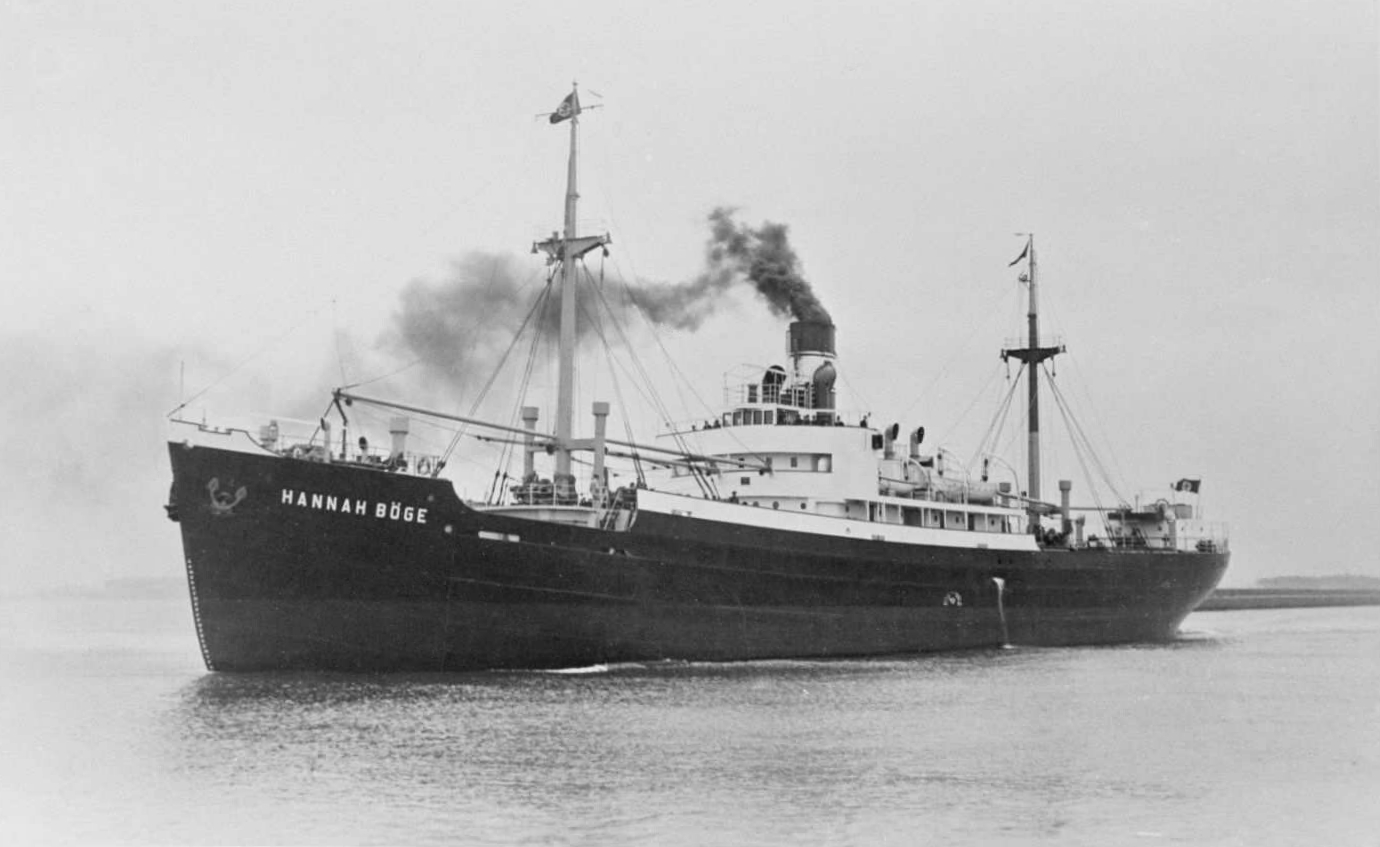
- The ship as Hannah Böge

History
- Name: 1938: Hannah Böge; 1939: Crown Arun
- Namesake: 1939: River Arun
- Owner: 1938: Johann MK Blumenthal; 1939: Ministry of Shipping
- Operator: 1939: Christian Salvesen
- Port of registry: 1938: (Nazi Germany) Hamburg; 1939: (United Kingdom) London
- Builder: AG „Neptun" Schiffswerft und Maschinenfabrik, Rostock
- Yard number: 477
- Completed: March 1938
- Identification: 1938: Call sign: DJVX; 1939: UK official number 167367; 1939: Call sign: GBJK
- Fate: Sunk by torpedo, 17 September 1940
- Notes: Sister ship: Claus Böge

General characteristics
- Type: cargo steamship
- Tonnage: 2,337 GRT; 1,334 NRT
- Length: 288.7 ft (88.0 m)
- Beam: 45.1 ft (13.7 m)
- Depth: 17.7 ft (5.4 m)
- Installed power: 4-cylinder compound engine; 1 × exhaust steam turbine; 126 NHP
- Propulsion: Single propeller
- Speed: 10 knots (19 km/h; 12 mph)
- Crew: 25

SS Crown Arun was a cargo steamship. She was built in Germany for Johann MK Blumenthal, and completed in 1938 as Hannah Böge. In 1939 the Royal Navy captured her, and she was declared a war prize. The UK Government took possession of her, renamed her Crown Arun, and put her into UK merchant service. In 1940 a German U-boat sank her by torpedo in the North Atlantic. All of her crew survived.

At least two JMK Blumenthal ships have been named Hannah Böge. The other was a steamship that was completed in 1955, and sold and renamed in 1959.

== Claus Böge and Hannah Böge ==
In 1936, AG „Neptun" Schiffswerft und Maschinenfabrik in Rostock built a small cargo steamship for JMK Blumenthal. She was built as yard number 461, and completed as Claus Böge. She had a single screw, and her main propulsion was a four-cylinder compound engine that was built by Ottensener Maschinenbau GmbH in Altona, Hamburg. This was augmented by an exhaust steam turbine, which drove the same propeller shaft via double reduction gearing and an hydraulic coupling. The combined power of her main engine plus exhaust turbine was rated at 142 NHP, and gave her a speed of 11 knots (20 km/h).

„Neptun" Werft then built a sister ship to the same dimensions for JMK Blumenthal. She was built as yard number 477, and completed in March 1938 as Hannah Böge. Her registered length was 288.7 ft (88.0 m), her beam was 45.1 ft (13.7 m), and her depth was 17.7 ft (5.4 m). Her tonnages were 2,337 GRT and 1,334 NRT. She had the same propulsion system as Claus Böge: an Ottensener Maschinenbau four-cylinder compound engine, plus an exhaust steam turbine with double reduction gearing and an hydraulic coupling. The combined power of her main engine plus exhaust turbine was rated at 126 NHP, and gave her a speed of 10 knots (19 km/h). Her navigation equipment included wireless direction finding, and an echo sounding device. Blumenthal registered Hannah Böge in Hamburg. Her call sign was DJVX.

== Capture ==
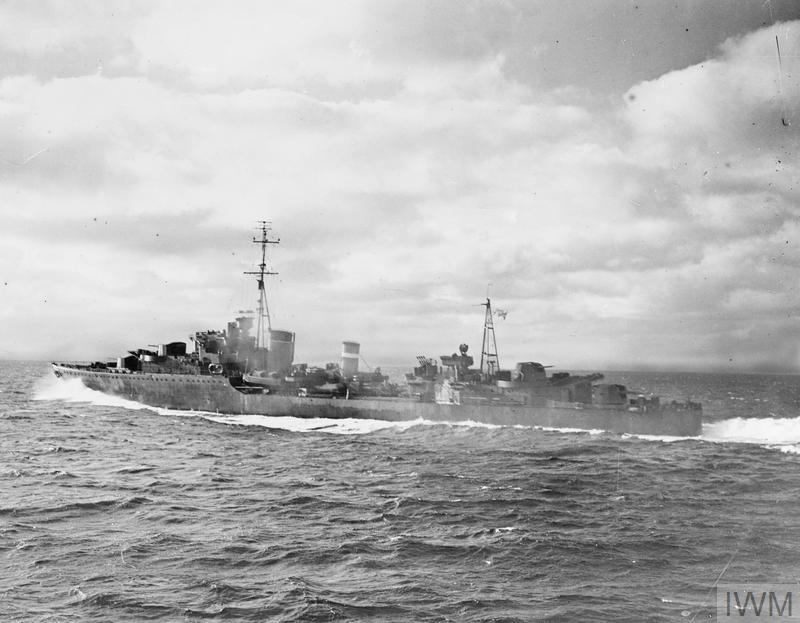
The destroyer HMS Somali under way

On 26 August 1939, Hannah Böge left Shediac, New Brunswick, with a cargo of wood pulp destined for Germany. On 1 September, Germany invaded Poland; and on 3 September, France and the UK declared war on Germany. Hannah Böge's crew started to try to disguise their ship, but later that same day, the destroyer HMS Somali intercepted and captured her in the North Atlantic at position 63°20′N 16°35′W. Somali put a prize crew aboard Hannah Böge, and escorted her to Kirkwall, Orkney, where she arrived on 5 September. She was later declared a war prize, which made her the first prize ship to be captured by the UK in the Second World War.

== UK service ==
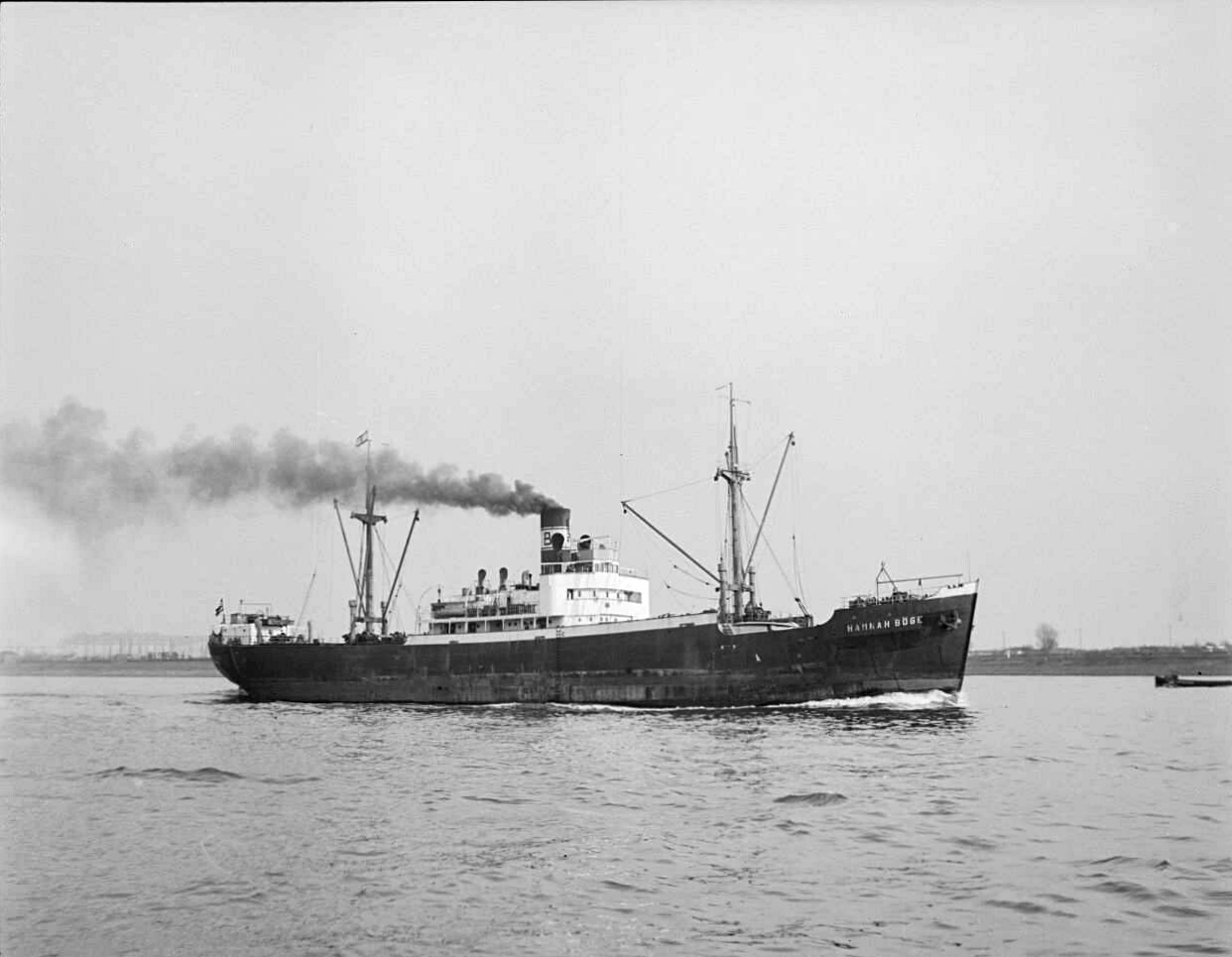
Hannah Böge under way

The UK Ministry of Shipping took possession of the ship, renamed her Crown Arun, and registered her in London. Her UK official number was 167367, and her call sign was GBJK. The Ministry of Shipping appointed Christian Salvesen Ltd of Leith to manage her.

On 5 December 1939, Crown Arun left Leith in the Firth of Forth. She joined Convoy ON 4, which reached Norwegian waters on 8 December. She continued independently to Bergen, where she arrived on 12 December. On New Year's Day 1940 she joined Convoy HN 6 in Norwegian waters, which reached Methil Roads on 4 January. From there she sailed via the Tyne to Hull, and returned via the Tyne and Blyth to Methil Roads.

On 17 February 1940, Crown Arun left Methil Roads as a member of Convoy ON 14, which was escorted by four E-class destroyers plus the submarine HMS Narwhal. The next day, the convoy was diverted to Kirkwall due to reports of enemy activity. The battlecruiser HMS Hood, and battleships HMS Rodney and HMS Warspite were sent as reinforcements, and on 20 February ON 14 resumed its voyage. The convoy crossed the North Sea in a southwesterly gale, and reached Norwegian waters on 22 February. Crown Arun returned from Norway with a cargo of wood pulp. She joined Convoy HN 19, which left Norwegian waters on 14 March, and reached Methil Roads three days later. Crown Arun detached from HN 19, and continued to Ellesmere Port on the Mersey.

On 21 March 1940, Crown Arun left the Mersey with Convoy OB 114. She detached from the convoy, and on 23 March reached Cardiff Docks. On 31 March, she left Milford Haven, and joined Convoy OB 120, which had left the Mersey the same day. On 3 April, OB 120 became Convoy OG 24, which sailed to Gibraltar. From there, Crown Arun continued to Béni Saf in French Algeria. She returned via Gibraltar, where she joined Convoy HG 27, which sailed on 21 April for Liverpool. Crown Arun detached from HG 27 in home waters, and reached Ardrossan in Ayrshire on 1 May.

On 19 May 1940, Crown Arun left the Firth of Clyde with a cargo of coal. She joined Convoy OB 151, which had left Liverpool that same day. OB 151 dispersed at sea on 22 May, and Crown Arun continued independently to Montreal, where she arrived on 4 June. From there she returned down the St. Lawrence River to Rimouski, and thence to Halifax, Nova Scotia with a cargo of timber. In Halifax Harbour she joined Convoy HX 53, which left on 25 June for Liverpool. Crown Arun detached in home waters, and arrived on 11 July in Preston, Lancashire.

Crown Arun seems to have shuttled between Preston and Swansea in south Wales, before leaving Milford Haven on 5 August with another cargo of coal. She joined Convoy OB 194, which left Liverpool on 6 August, and dispersed at sea four days later. Crown Arun continued independently to Montreal, where she arrived on 23 August.

=== Loss ===
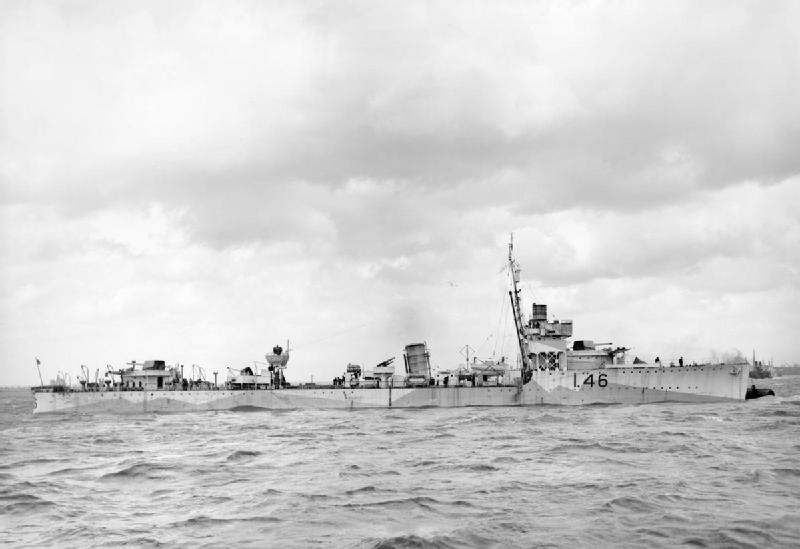
The destroyer HMS Winchelsea

Crown Arun left Montreal on 24 August 1940, and called at Gaspé, Quebec, where she loaded a cargo of pit props. Her Master was Captain Hugh Laurence Leaske. She reached Sydney, Cape Breton Island on 2 September. There she joined Convoy SHX 71, which left on 6 September to merge at sea with Convoy HX 71 from Halifax. On 8 September, HX 71 sighted SHX 71, but by then Crown Arun was straggling.

Crown Arun continued to straggle until the morning of 17 September, when U-99 attacked her north of Rockall. At 08:32 hrs the U-boat torpedoed her, and then opened fire with her 88 mm deck gun. Crown Arun sank at position 58°02′N 14°18′W, but all of her crew survived. The destroyer HMS Winchelsea detached from Convoy OB 213, rescued Crown Arun's crew, and then reinforced HX 71's escort to Liverpool.

== Bibliography ==
- Lloyd's Register of Shipping (PDF). Vol. II.–Steamers and Motorships of 300 tons cross and over. London: Lloyd's Register of Shipping. 1937 – via Southampton City Council.
- Lloyd's Register of Shipping (PDF). Vol. II.–Steamers and Motorships of 300 tons cross and over. London: Lloyd's Register of Shipping. 1938 – via Southampton City Council.
- Lloyd's Register of Shipping (PDF). Vol. II.–Steamers and Motorships of 300 tons, trawlers, tugs, dredgers, etc. London: Lloyd's Register of Shipping. 1939 – via Southampton City Council.
- Mitchell, WH; Sawyer, LA (1995). The Empire Ships. London, New York, Hamburg, Hong Kong: Lloyd's of London Press Ltd. ISBN 1-85044-275-4.
- Register Book. Vol. I. Register of Ships. London: Lloyd's Register of Shipping. 1959 – via Internet Archive.
