= SS Claus Böge =

German cargo steamship sunk by sabotage

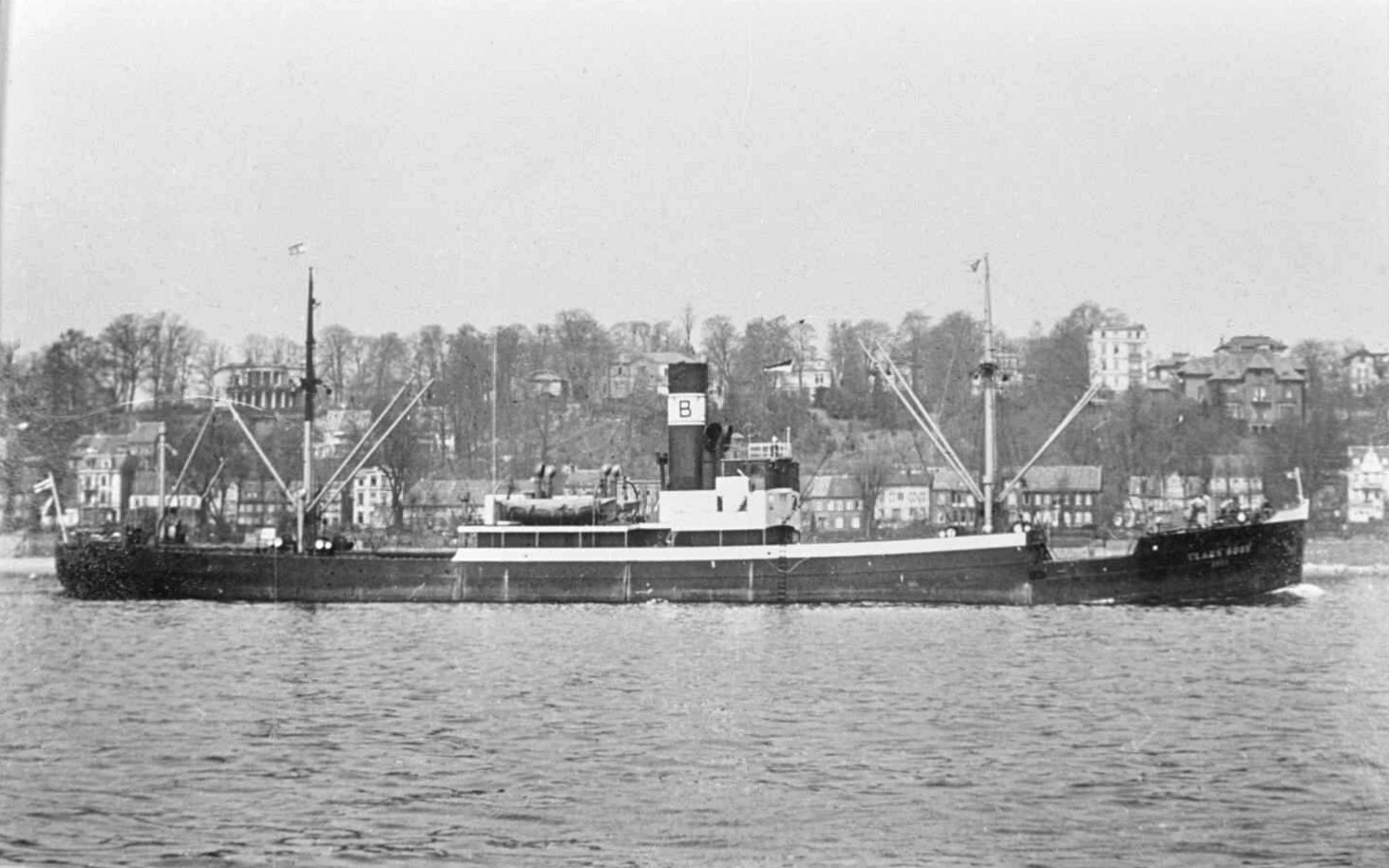
- Claus Böge, probably on the Elbe

History

Germany
- Name: Claus Böge
- Owner: Johann MK Blumenthal
- Port of registry: Hamburg
- Builder: AG "Neptun" Schiffswerft und Maschinenfabrik, Rostock
- Yard number: 461
- Completed: 1936
- Identification: call sign DJRP
- Fate: Sunk by sabotage, 19 March 1938

General characteristics
- Type: cargo steamship
- Tonnage: 2,340 GRT, 1,343 NRT
- Length: 288.9 ft (88.1 m)
- Beam: 45.1 ft (13.7 m)
- Depth: 17.7 ft (5.4 m)
- Decks: 1
- Installed power: 1 × 4-cylinder compound engine; 1 × exhaust steam turbine; 142 NHP
- Propulsion: 1 × screw
- Speed: 11 knots (20 km/h)
- Crew: 21
- Sensors & processing systems: wireless direction finding
- Notes: sister ship: Hannah Böge

SS Claus Böge was a German cargo steamship. She was built in Rostock in 1936 for Johann MK Blumenthal of Hamburg. In 1938 she was carrying arms from Norway to the Nationalist part of Spain when two bombs exploded aboard her, sinking her in the North Sea off the Danish coast. Her Master was killed, but a Swedish cargo steamship rescued the remainder of her 21 crew.

== Claus Böge and Hannah Böge ==
In 1936, AG "Neptun" Schiffswerft und Maschinenfabrik in Rostock built a small cargo steamship for JMK Blumenthal. She was built as yard number 461, and completed as Claus Böge. Her registered length was 288.9 ft (88.1 m), her beam was 45.1 ft (13.7 m), and her depth was 17.7 ft (5.4 m). Her tonnages were 2,340 GRT and 1,343 NRT. She had a single screw, and her main propulsion was a four-cylinder compound engine that was built by Ottensener Maschinenbau GmbH in Altona, Hamburg. This was augmented by an exhaust steam turbine, which drove the same propeller shaft via double reduction gearing and an hydraulic coupling. The combined power of her main engine plus exhaust turbine was rated at 142 NHP, and gave her a speed of 11 knots (20 km/h). Her navigation equipment included wireless direction finding. Blumenthal registered her in Hamburg. Her call sign was DJRP.

In 1938, "Neptun" Werft then built a sister ship to the same dimensions for JMK Blumenthal, with the same propulsion system. She was built as yard number 477, and completed in March 1938 as Hannah Böge.

== Loss ==
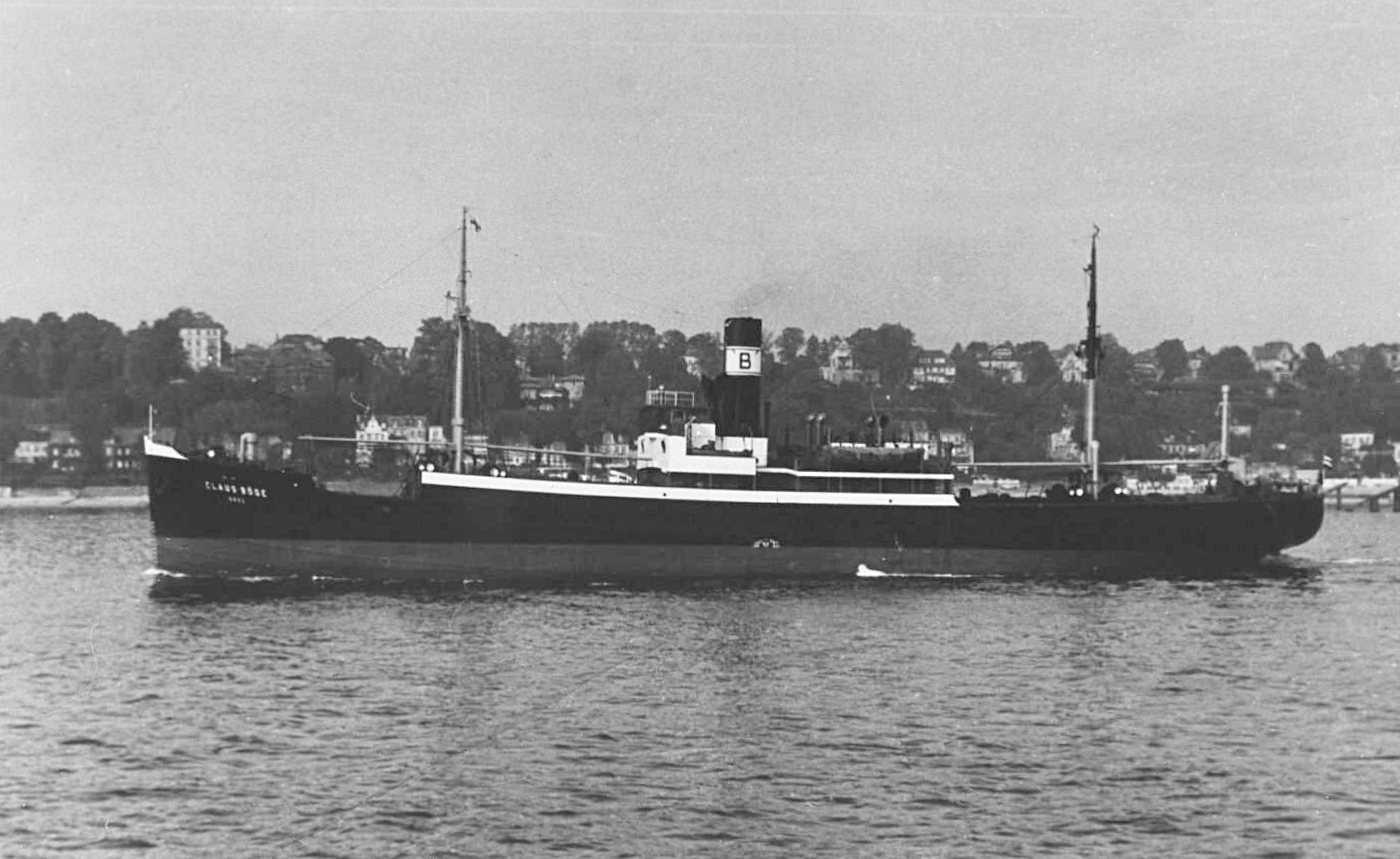
Claus Böge, probably on the Elbe

In March 1938, Claus Böge discharged a cargo of coke in Filipstad in Oslo, Norway. She then left for Huelva, a port in the part of Spain controlled by Nationalist forces in the Spanish Civil War. Some reports alleged that she was carrying arms, in contravention of the international Non-Intervention Agreement, to which Norway was a signatory. On 19 March, two explosions in her forward cargo holds sank Claus Böge about 20 nautical miles (37 km) northwest of the Horns-Rev lightship, off the west coast of Jutland. Claus Böge transmitted a wireless distress signal, and sank ten minutes later, at position at position 55°39′58″N 0°40′12″E. The Master was killed, but a Swedish cargo steamship, Sverre Nergaard, rescued his crew.

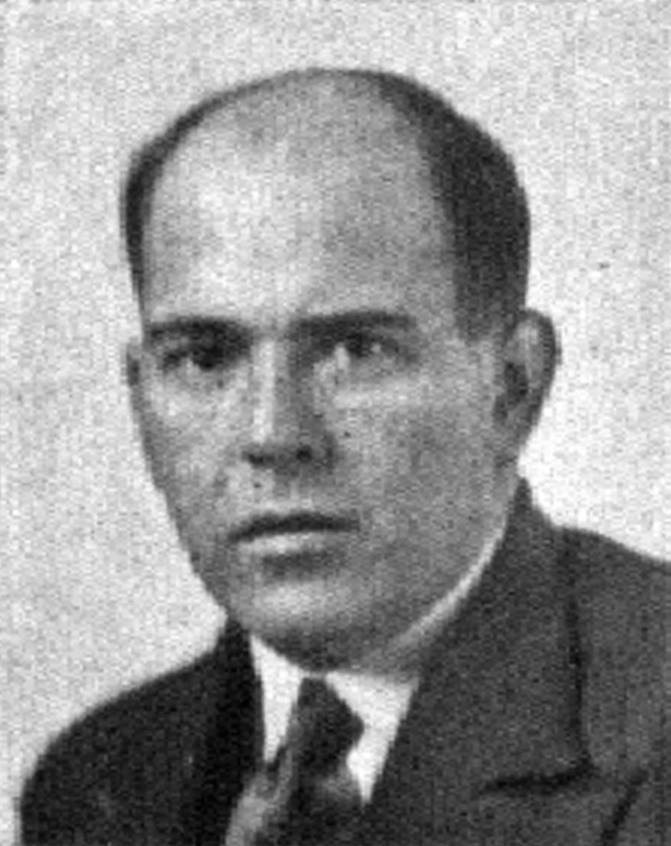
Ernst Wollweber in 1932

Some initial news reports mistakenly assumed that the ship had struck a mine. Thousand of mines had been laid in the First World War; some had drifted from their original positions; and there were still occasional incidents of ships being sunk or damaged by them, two decades after the Armistice. However, other sources more circumspectly described it as an explosion in her forward hold.

In fact, the explosions were dynamite, planted by anti-fascist saboteurs working for the German Communist agent Ernst Wollweber. In 1933 he had fled from Germany to Copenhagen. From there he moved to Leningrad (now Saint Petersburg), and then in 1936 he and his Norwegian wife moved to Sinsenterrassen in Oslo. Wollweber recruited a network of agents in Norway and Sweden. They stole dynamite from iron ore mines in Kiruna and Luleå in northern Sweden, smuggled it to Narvik in northern Norway, and thence by sea to Oslo, where anti-fascist dock workers planted it aboard Claus Böge.

== Investigation ==
In summer 1938, Gestapo detectives visited Oslo and met Norwegian police to discuss the case. A police crackdown shut down much of Wollweber's network, but he himself remained undetected, and continued to live in Sinsen. When Germany invaded Norway in April 1940, Wollweber fled to Sweden, where he was interned until 1944. Martin Rasmussen Hjelmen, the Chairman of the Norwegian part of Wollweber's organisation, was also interned there. The Nazi government applied diplomatic pressure to Sweden to deport both men to Germany. In 1944, Sweden surrendered Hjelmen to Germany, where he was imprisoned, tortured, and executed. Wollweber, however, was deported to the Soviet Union, whence he returned to Germany in 1945.

== See also ==
- SS Boccaccio, an Italian ship sunk by Wollweber's anti-fascist saboteurs.

== Bibliography ==
- Lloyd's Register of Shipping (PDF). Vol. II.–Steamers and Motorships of 300 tons cross and over. London: Lloyd's Register of Shipping. 1937 – via Southampton City Council.
- Lloyd's Register of Shipping (PDF). Vol. II.–Steamers and Motorships of 300 tons cross and over. London: Lloyd's Register of Shipping. 1938 – via Southampton City Council.
