= Walter Gramsch =

German transportation official

Walter Gramsch (born 15 January 1897, date of death unknown) worked in a high position for the State Railways in Nazi Germany, and was involved in the 20 July plot against Hitler. Gramsch later became a high ranking transportation official in the Communist East German government (The GDR). However he was unhappy with the GDR and thus became a spy against it. He used his position to feed information to the West German Gehlen Organization.

In particular, he spied on Ernst Wollweber, a Communist sabotage expert. After the war Wollweber had become a high official in the East Germany Directorate-General of Shipping, the same area as Gramsch. Gramsch was thus in a good position to report on his activities. This resulted in, among other things, the upset of several of Wollweber's attempts to smuggle products past the Western embargo into East Germany.

In the mid-1950s Gramsch was 'recalled' to West Germany. This was to protect him from the East German SSD (coincidentally, then run by the same Wollweber he had formerly spied on) which had become recently successful in discovering and executing large numbers of spies.

== Sources ==
- Höhne, Heinz, and Zolling, Hermann (1972). The General Was a Spy. Coward, McCann & Geoghegan, Inc, New York. (Published in Germany as Pullach Intern, 1971, Hoffman and Campe Verlag, Hamburg)
