= SS Boccaccio =

British-built cargo steamship

History
- Name: 1919: War Zenith; 1919: Tunisier; 1932: Boccaccio
- Namesake: 1919: Tunisian; 1932: Giovanni Boccaccio
- Owner: 1919: Lloyd Royal Belge, SA; 1930: CMB (Lloyd Royal), SA; 1932: Adria SA di Nav Mar; 1936: 'Tirrenia' SA di Nav
- Port of registry: 1919: (Belgium) Antwerp; 1932: (Kingdom of Italy) Fiume
- Builder: Lloyd Royal Belge (GB) Ltd, Glasgow
- Yard number: 11
- Launched: 12 November 1919
- Completed: December 1919
- Identification: until 1932: code letters MTUR; 1932–33: code letters NGQT; by 1934: call sign IBLE
- Fate: Sunk by sabotage, 18 November 1937

General characteristics
- Tonnage: 3,012 GRT, 2,045 NRT
- Length: 331.0 ft (100.9 m)
- Beam: 46.7 ft (14.2 m)
- Draught: 12 ft 9 in (3.9 m)
- Depth: 23.2 ft (7.1 m)
- Decks: 2
- Installed power: 1 × triple-expansion engine; 359 NHP
- Propulsion: 1 × screw
- Speed: 11.5 knots (21 km/h)
- Sensors & processing systems: by 1934: wireless direction finding

SS Boccaccio was a cargo steamship that was built in Scotland in 1919. She was a War Standard Type C ship: one of several standard designs issued by the UK Shipping Controller. Lloyd Royal Belge (LRB) built her in Glasgow. She was launched as War Zenith, but completed the following month as Tunisier. She was in Belgian ownership until 1932.

In 1932, Italian owners bought Tunisier, and renamed her Boccaccio. In 1937, she was carrying arms to the Nationalist part of Spain when a bomb exploded aboard her, sinking her off the coast of Brittany. One member of her crew was killed, but a Dutch cargo liner rescued 31 survivors.

== Building ==
LRB built the ship at its own shipyard in Jordanvale, Glasgow, as yard number 11. Ships built for the Shipping Controller were given names prefixed with War, so she was launched on 12 November 1919 as War Zenith. However, LRB policy was to give each ship a French-language demonym ending in -ier, so she was completed that December as Tunisier.

The ship's registered length was 331.0 ft (100.9 m), her beam was 46.7 ft (14.2 m), her depth was 23.2 ft (7.1 m), and her draught was 12 ft 9 in (3.9 m). Her tonnages were 3,012 GRT and 2,045 NRT. She had a single screw, driven by a three-cylinder triple-expansion engine built by David Rowan & Co of Glasgow. It was rated at 359 NHP, and gave her a speed of 11.5 knots (21 km/h).

== Changes of ownership ==
LRB registered Tunisier at Antwerp. Her code letters were MTUR. LRB got into financial difficulties during the Great Depression, and in 1930 it was taken over by Compagnie Maritime Belge. The merged company was named CMB (Lloyd Royal).

In 1932, Adria Società Anonima di Navigazione Marittima bought Tunisier, renamed her Boccaccio, and registered her in Fiume in the then Italian Province of Fiume, which is now Rijeka in Croatia. Her code letters were NGQT. By 1934, her call sign was IBLE, and this had superseded her code letters. In December 1936, the Adria shipping company became part of a new state-owned corporation, 'Tirrenia' Società Anonima di Navigazione.

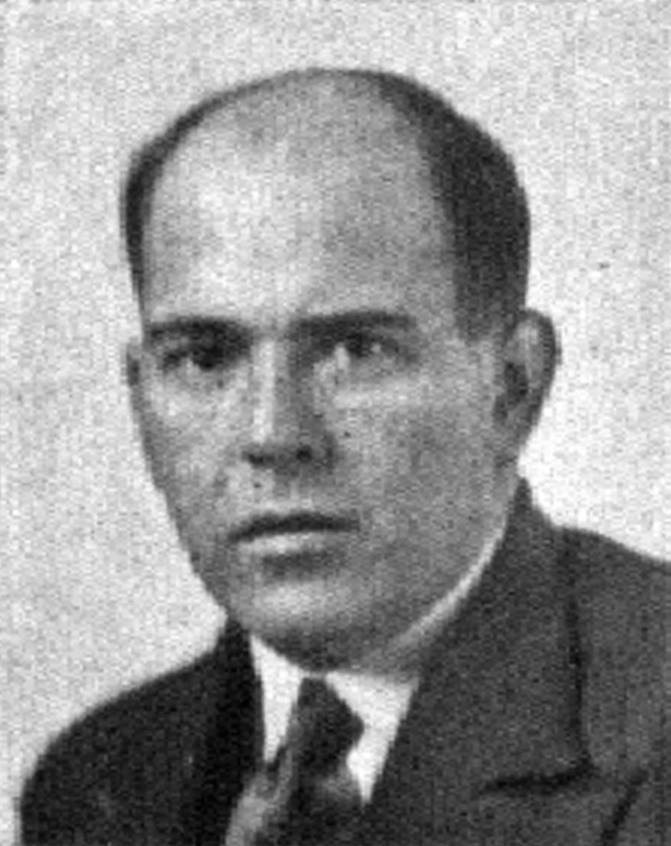
Ernst Wollweber in 1932

== Loss ==
On 18 November 1937, Boccaccio was en route from Hamburg and Antwerp, and rounding the western tip of Brittany, when she sustained an explosion and sank at position 48°12′N 05°15′W. Officially, she was laden with steel, general cargo, and about 1,000 tons of copper, and bound for Genoa. However, she was also reported to be carrying arms and ammunition to supply the Nationalist faction in the Spanish Civil War. A network of anti-fascist saboteurs recruited by the German Communist agent Ernst Wollweber had planted dynamite aboard her, which detonated as she was passing from the English Channel into the Bay of Biscay. One member of the crew was killed. A Netherland Line motor ship, Tajandoen, rescued 31 survivors.

== See also ==
- SS Claus Böge, a German ship sunk by Wollweber's anti-fascist saboteurs.

== Bibliography ==
- Lloyd's Register of Shipping. Vol. II.–Steamers and Motor Vessels. London: Lloyd's Register of Shipping. 1922 – via Internet Archive.
- Lloyd's Register of Shipping (PDF). Vol. II.–Steamers and Motorships of 300 Tons Gross and Over. London: Lloyd's Register of Shipping. 1931 – via Southampton City Council.
- Lloyd's Register of Shipping (PDF). Vol. II.–Steamers and Motorships of 300 Tons Gross and Over. London: Lloyd's Register of Shipping. 1933 – via Southampton City Council.
- Lloyd's Register of Shipping (PDF). Vol. II.–Steamers and Motorships of 300 Tons Gross and Over. London: Lloyd's Register of Shipping. 1934 – via Southampton City Council.
- Lloyd's Register of Shipping (PDF). Vol. II.–Steamers and Motorships of 300 Tons Gross and Over. London: Lloyd's Register of Shipping. 1937 – via Southampton City Council.
