= Red Army =

Soviet army and air force from 1918 to 1946

Workers' and Peasants' Red Army
- Рабоче-крестьянская Красная армия
- Red Army headgear insignia
- Active: 28 January 1918 – 25 February 1946
- Country: Russian SFSR (1918–1922); Soviet Union (1922–1946)
- Type: Army and Air force
- Role: Land warfare
- Size: 6,437,755 (Russian Civil War); 34,476,700 (World War II)
- Engagements: World War I (Feb–Mar 1918); Russian Civil War (1917–23); Polish–Soviet War (1918–21); Mongolia intervention (1921–24); August Uprising (1924); Urtatagai conflict (1925–1926); Red Army intervention in Afghanistan (1929); Sino-Soviet conflict (1929); Red Army intervention in Afghanistan (1930); Xinjiang invasion (1934); First Japanese War (1932–39); Winter War (1939-1940); Continuation War (1941–1944); World War II (1939–45)

Commanders
- Chief of the General Staff: See list

The Workers' and Peasants' Red Army, (Note: Russian: Рабоче-крестьянская Красная армия (РККА), romanized: Raboche-krest'yanskaya Krasnaya armiya (RKKA)) often referred by its shortened name as the Red Army, (Note: Russian: Красная армия, romanized: Krasnaya armiya, IPA: [ˈkrasnəjə ˈarmʲɪjə]) was the army and air force of the Russian Soviet Republic and, from 1922, the Soviet Union. The army was established in January 1918 by a decree of the Council of People's Commissars to oppose the military forces of the new nation's adversaries during the Russian Civil War, especially the various groups collectively known as the White Army. In February 1946, the Red Army (which embodied the main component of the Soviet Armed Forces alongside the Soviet Navy) was renamed the "Soviet Army". Following the dissolution of the Soviet Union, it was split between the post-Soviet states, with its bulk becoming the Russian Ground Forces, commonly considered to be the successor of the Soviet Army.

Although the Red Army's performance in the Polish-Soviet War, the Winter War, and the opening stages of Operation Barbarossa was mixed and often poor, it ultimately emerged as a highly effective fighting force that was capable of shattering the Axis frontline. The Red Army provided the largest ground force in the Allied victory in the European theatre of World War II, and its invasion of Manchuria assisted the unconditional surrender of Japan. On the Eastern Front, it fought the largest and deadliest land war in history, which accounted for roughly 75% of German combat casualties during the war, and ultimately captured the German capital, Berlin. Red Army personnel were also involved in Soviet war crimes against civilians and prisoners of war, particularly in Eastern and Central Europe.

Up to 34 million soldiers served in the Red Army during World War II, 8 million of which were non-Slavic minorities. Officially, the Red Army lost 6,329,600 killed in action (KIA), 555,400 deaths by disease and 4,559,000 missing in action (MIA) (mostly captured). Of the 4.5 million missing, 939,700 rejoined the ranks in liberated Soviet territory, and a further 1,836,000 returned from German captivity. The official grand total of losses (killed, missing and died of disease or in captivity) amounted to 8,668,300, the majority of which were ethnic Russians (5,756,000), followed by ethnic Ukrainians (1,377,400). This is the official total dead, but other estimates give the number of total dead up to almost 11 million. Officials at the Russian Central Defense Ministry Archive (CDMA) maintain that their database lists the names of roughly 14 million dead and missing service personnel.

== Origins ==
In September 1917, Vladimir Lenin wrote:

"There is only one way to prevent the restoration of the police, and that is to create a people's militia and to fuse it with the army (the standing army to be replaced by the arming of the entire people)."

At the time, the Imperial Russian Army had started to collapse. Approximately 23% (about 19 million) of the male population of the Russian Empire were mobilized; however, most of them were not equipped with any weapons and had support roles such as maintaining the lines of communication and the base areas. The Tsarist general Nikolay Dukhonin estimated that there had been 2 million deserters, 1.8 million dead, 5 million wounded and 2 million prisoners. He estimated the remaining troops as numbering 10 million.

While the Imperial Russian Army was being taken apart, "it became apparent that the rag-tag Red Guard units and elements of the imperial army who had gone over the side of the Bolsheviks were quite inadequate to the task of defending the new government against external foes." Therefore, the Council of People's Commissars decided to form the Red Army on 28 January 1918. (Note: 15 January 1918 (Old Style).) They envisioned a body "formed from the class-conscious and best elements of the working classes." All citizens of the Russian republic aged 18 or older were eligible. Its role being the defense "of the Soviet authority, the creation of a basis for the transformation of the standing army into a force deriving its strength from a nation in arms, and, furthermore, the creation of a basis for the support of the coming Socialist Revolution in Europe." Enlistment was conditional upon "guarantees being given by a military or civil committee functioning within the territory of the Soviet Power, or by party or trade union committees or, in extreme cases, by two persons belonging to one of the above organizations." In the event of an entire unit wanting to join the Red Army, a "collective guarantee and the affirmative vote of all its members would be necessary." Because the Red Army was composed mainly of peasants, the families of those who served were guaranteed rations and assistance with farm work. Some peasants who remained at home yearned to join the Army; men, along with some women, flooded the recruitment centres. If they were turned away, they would collect scrap metal and prepare care-packages. In some cases, the money they earned would go towards tanks for the Army.

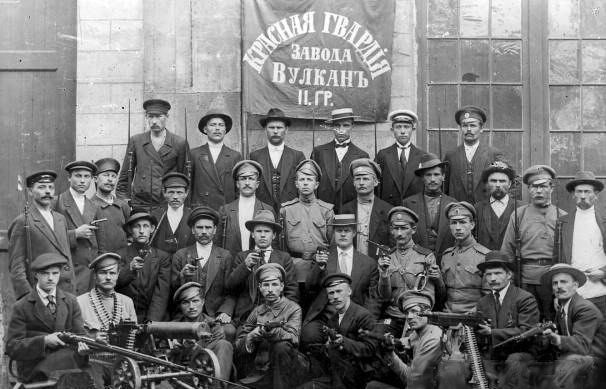
Red Guards unit of the Vulkan factory, Petrograd

The Council of People's Commissars appointed itself the supreme head of the Red Army, delegating command and administration of the army to the Commissariat for Military Affairs and the Special All-Russian College within this commissariat. Nikolai Krylenko was the supreme commander-in-chief, with Aleksandr Myasnikyan as deputy. Nikolai Podvoisky became the commissar for war, Pavel Dybenko, commissar for the fleet. Proshyan, Samoisky, Steinberg were also specified as people's commissars as well as Vladimir Bonch-Bruyevich from the Bureau of Commissars. At a joint meeting of Bolsheviks and Left Socialist-Revolutionaries, held on 22 February 1918, Krylenko remarked:

"We have no army. The demoralized soldiers are fleeing, panic-stricken, as soon as they see a German helmet appear on the horizon, abandoning their artillery, convoys and all war material to the triumphantly advancing enemy. The Red Guard units are brushed aside like flies. We have no power to stay the enemy; only an immediate signing of the peace treaty will save us from destruction."

== History ==
=== Russian Civil War ===
Hammer and plough cockade used by the Red Army from 1918 to 1922, when it was replaced by the hammer and sickle.

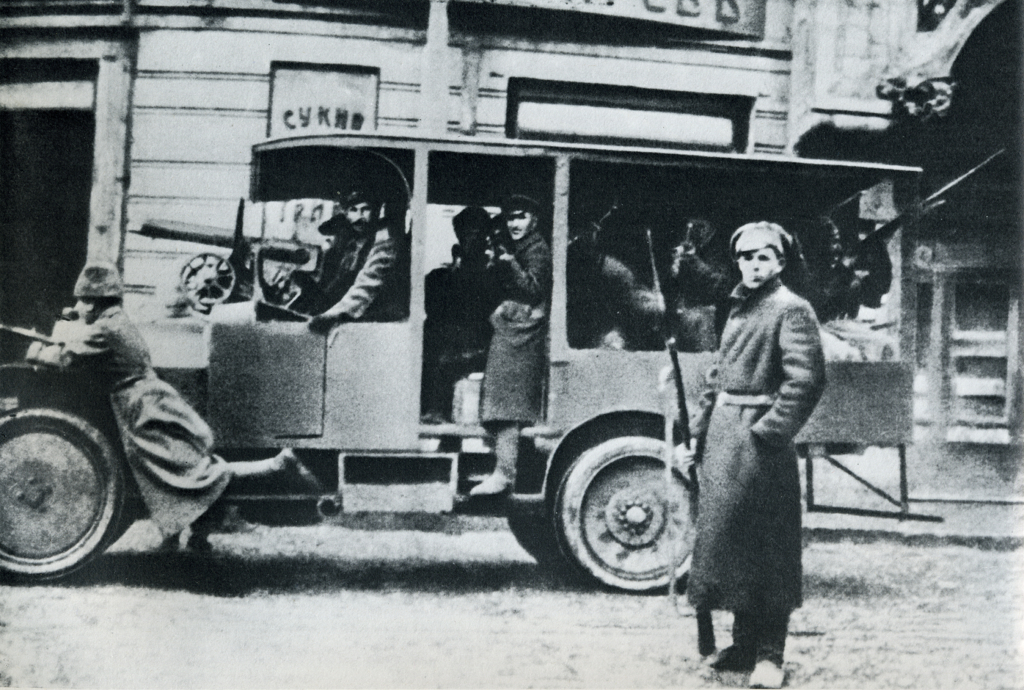
Soviet Soldiers in 1918

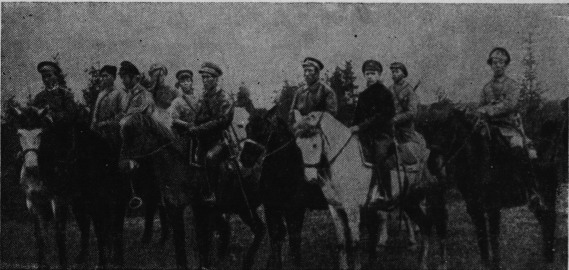
Chinese Bolsheviks on the Eastern Front

The Russian Civil War (1917–1923) can be divided into three periods:

1. October 1917 – November 1918, from the October Revolution to the World War I armistice. The Bolshevik government's nationalization of traditional Cossack lands in November 1917 provoked the insurrection of General Alexey Maximovich Kaledin's Volunteer Army in the River Don region. The Treaty of Brest-Litovsk of March 1918 aggravated Russian internal politics. The overall situation encouraged direct Allied intervention in the Russian Civil War, in which twelve foreign countries supported anti-Bolshevik militias. A series of engagements resulted, involving, amongst others, the Czechoslovak Legion, the Polish 5th Rifle Division, and the pro-Bolshevik Red Latvian Riflemen.
2. January 1919 – November 1919, the advance and retreat of the White armies. Initially the White armies advanced successfully: from the south, under General Anton Denikin; from the east, under Admiral Aleksandr Vasilevich Kolchak; and from the northwest, under General Nikolai Nikolaevich Yudenich. The Whites beat back the Red Army on each front. Leon Trotsky reformed and counterattacked – the Red Army repelled Admiral Kolchak's army in June, and the armies of General Denikin and General Yudenich in October. By mid-November the White armies were all almost completely exhausted. In January 1920 Budenny's 1st Cavalry Army entered Rostov-on-Don.
3. 1919 to 1923, residual conflicts. Some peripheral theatres continued to see conflict for two more years, and remnants of the White forces remained in the Russian Far East into 1923.
  The RSFSR in 1918 on the left and the USSR in 1922 on the right.

At the start of the civil war, the Red Army consisted of 299 infantry regiments. The civil war intensified after Lenin dissolved the Russian Constituent Assembly (5–6 January 1918) and the Soviet government signed the Treaty of Brest-Litovsk (3 March 1918), removing Russia from the First World War. Freed from international obligations, the Red Army confronted an internecine war against a variety of opposing anti-Bolshevik forces, including the Revolutionary Insurgent Army of Ukraine led by Nestor Makhno, the anti-White and anti-Red Green armies, efforts to restore the defeated Provisional Government, monarchists, but mainly the White Movement of several different anti-socialist military confederations. "Red Army Day", 23 February 1918, has a two-fold historical significance: it was the first day of conscription (in Petrograd and Moscow), and the first day of combat against the occupying Imperial German Army. (Note: 8 February became "Soviet Army Day", a national holiday in the USSR.)

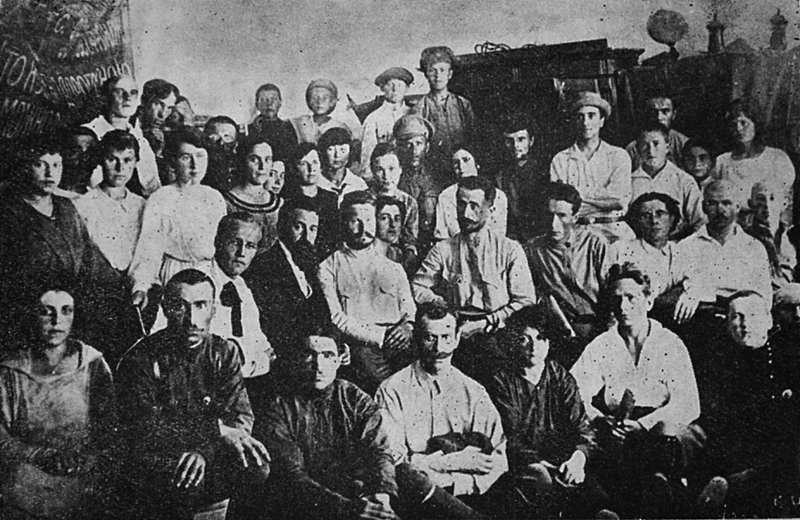
Political section of the Turkestan Front of the Red Army.

The Red Army controlled by the Russian Socialist Federative Soviet Republic also against independence movements, invading and annexing newly independent states of the former Russian Empire. This included three military campaigns against the army of the Ukrainian People's Republic, in January–February 1918, January–February 1919, and May–October 1920. Conquered nations were subsequently incorporated into the Soviet Union.

In June 1918, Leon Trotsky abolished workers' control over the Red Army, replacing the election of officers with traditional army hierarchies and criminalizing dissent with the death penalty. Simultaneously, Trotsky carried out a mass recruitment of officers from the old Imperial Russian Army, who were employed as military advisors (voenspetsy). The Bolsheviks occasionally enforced the loyalty of such recruits by holding their families as hostages. As a result of this initiative, in 1918, 75% of the officers were former tsarists. By mid-August 1920 the Red Army's former tsarist personnel included 48,000 officers, 10,300 administrators, and 214,000 non-commissioned officers. When the civil war ended in 1922, ex-tsarists constituted 83% of the Red Army's divisional and corps commanders.

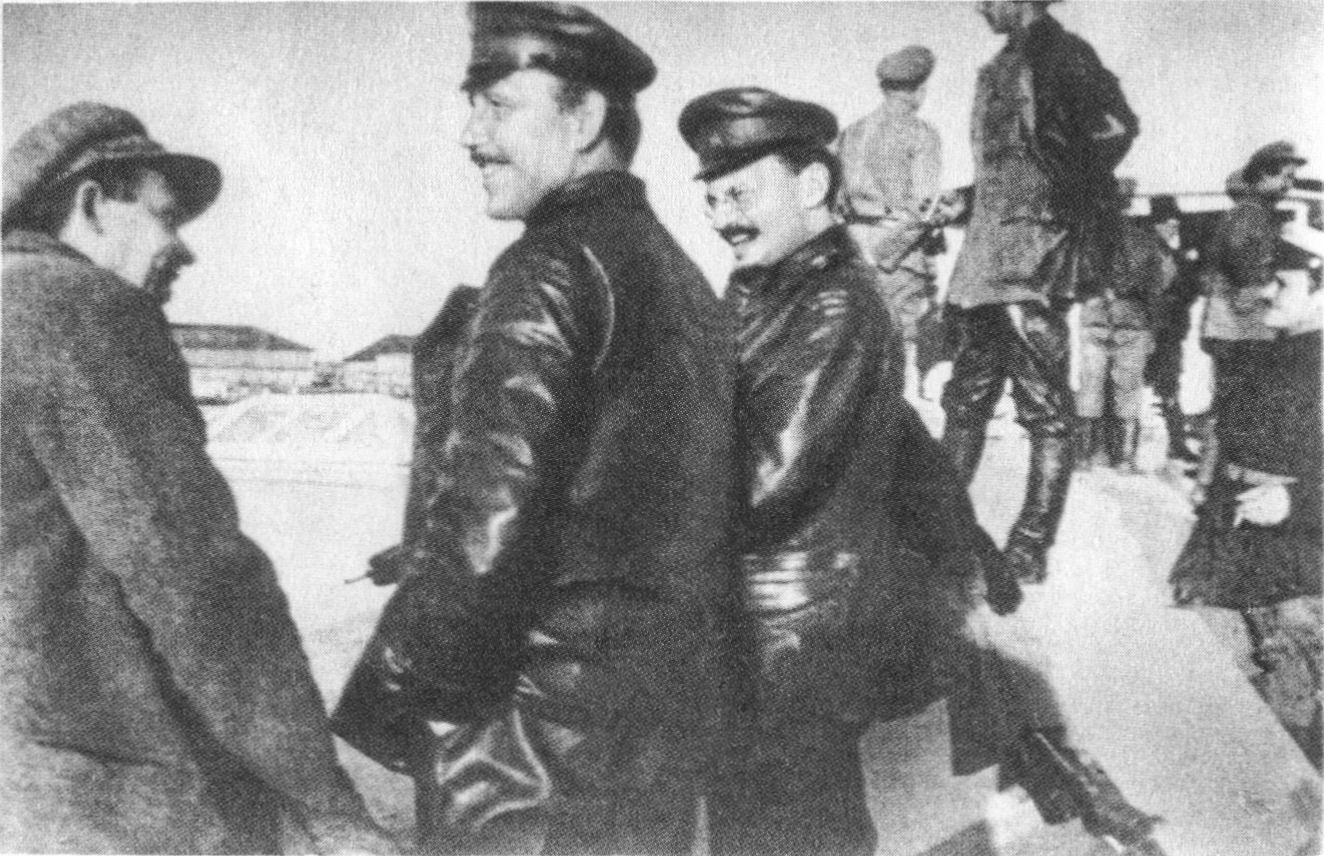
Leon Trotsky and Demyan Bedny in 1918

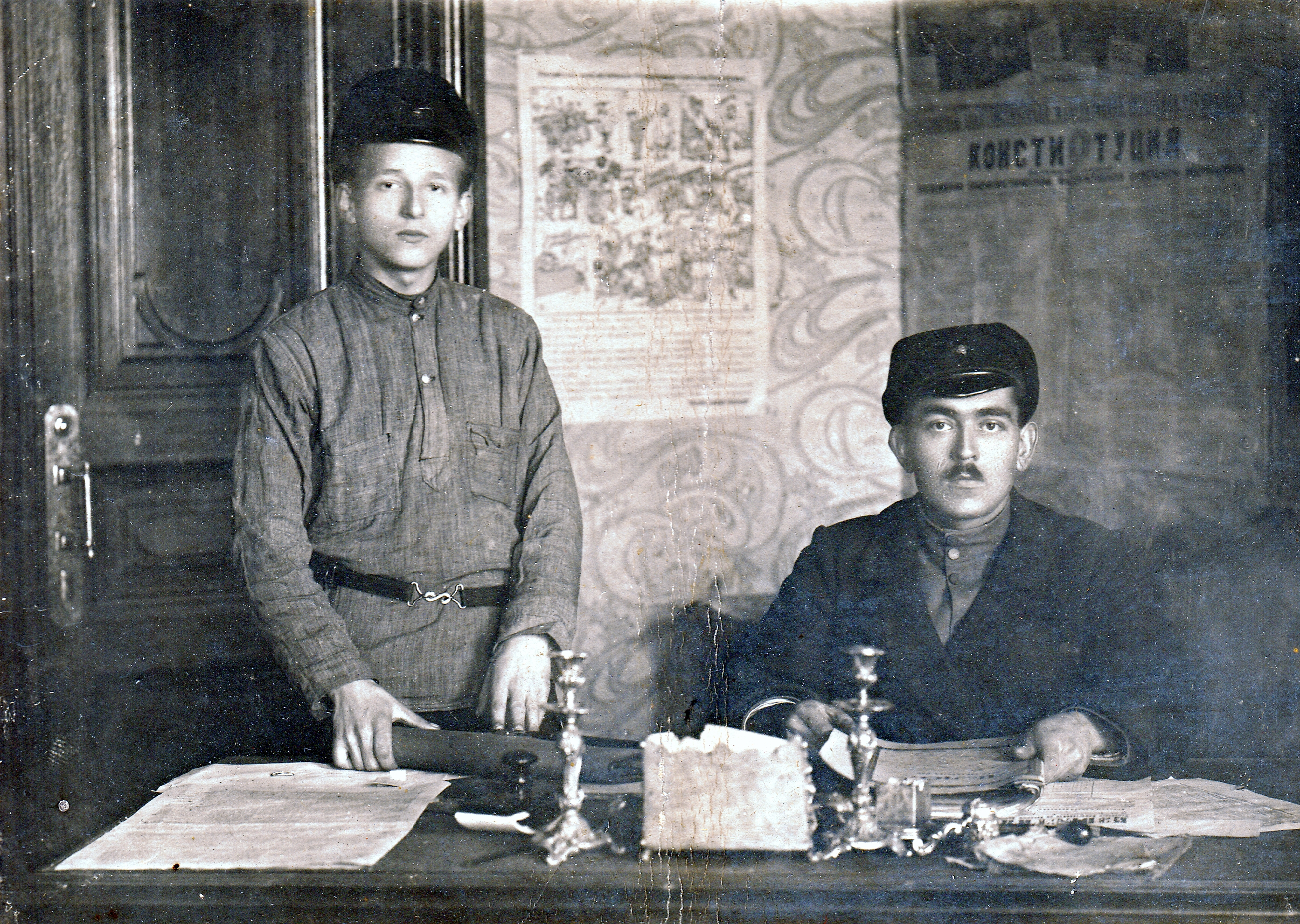
Two Bolsheviks in 1919

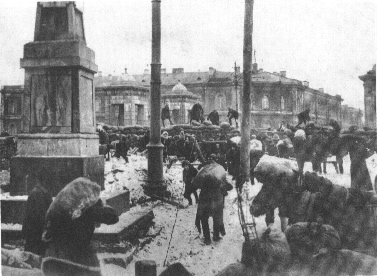
Petrograd in 1919

In September 1918, the Bolshevik militias consolidated under the supreme command of the Revolutionary Military Council of the Republic (Russian: Революционный Военный Совет, romanized: Revolyutsionny Voyenny Sovyet (Revvoyensoviet)). The first chairman was Trotsky, and the first commander-in-chief was Jukums Vācietis of the Latvian Riflemen; in July 1919 he was replaced by Sergey Kamenev. Soon afterwards Trotsky established the GRU (military intelligence) to provide political and military intelligence to Red Army commanders. Trotsky founded the Red Army with an initial Red Guard organization and a core soldiery of Red Guard militiamen and the Cheka secret police. Conscription began in June 1918, and opposition to it was violently suppressed. To control the multi-ethnic and multi-cultural Red Army soldiery, the Cheka operated special punitive brigades which suppressed anti-communists, deserters, and "enemies of the state".

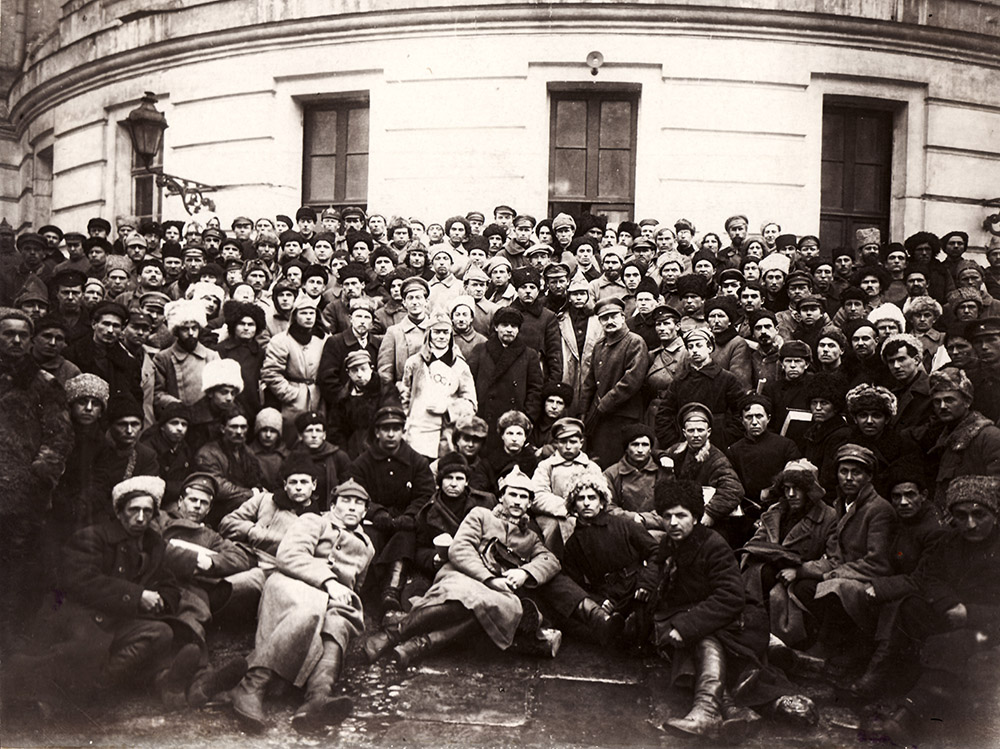
Vladimir Lenin, Kliment Voroshilov, Leon Trotsky and soldiers, Petrograd, 1921

In 1919, 612 "hardcore" deserters of the total 837,000 draft dodgers and deserters were executed following Trotsky's draconian measures. According to Figes, "a majority of deserters (most registered as "weak-willed") were handed back to the military authorities, and formed into units for transfer to one of the rear armies or directly to the front". Even those registered as "malicious" deserters were returned to the ranks when the demand for reinforcements became desperate". Forges also noted that the Red Army instituted amnesty weeks to prohibit punitive measures against desertion which encouraged the voluntary return of 98,000–132,000 deserters to the army.

The Red Army used special regiments for ethnic minorities, such as the Dungan Cavalry Regiment commanded by the Dungan Magaza Masanchi. It also co-operated with armed Bolshevik Party-oriented volunteer units, the Forces of Special Purpose from 1919 to 1925.

The slogan "exhortation, organization, and reprisals" expressed the discipline and motivation which helped ensure the Red Army's tactical and strategic success. On campaign, the attached Cheka special punitive brigades conducted summary field court-martial and executions of deserters and slackers. Under Commissar Yan Karlovich Berzin, the brigades took hostages from the villages of deserters to compel their surrender; one in ten of those returning was executed. The same tactic also suppressed peasant rebellions in areas controlled by the Red Army, the biggest of these being the Tambov Rebellion. The Soviets enforced the loyalty of the various political, ethnic, and national groups in the Red Army through political commissars attached at the brigade and regimental levels. The commissars also had the task of spying on commanders for political incorrectness. In August 1918, Trotsky authorized General Mikhail Tukhachevsky to place blocking units behind politically unreliable Red Army units, to shoot anyone who retreated without permission. In 1942, during the Great Patriotic War (1941–1945) Joseph Stalin reintroduced the blocking policy and penal battalions with Order 227.

In the spring of 1919, Anna Novikova was enrolled in the school of infantry commanders in Moscow. After completing military training, she became the first woman to command a combat unit of the Red Army. In 1920, she fought on an armored train.

=== Polish–Soviet War and prelude ===
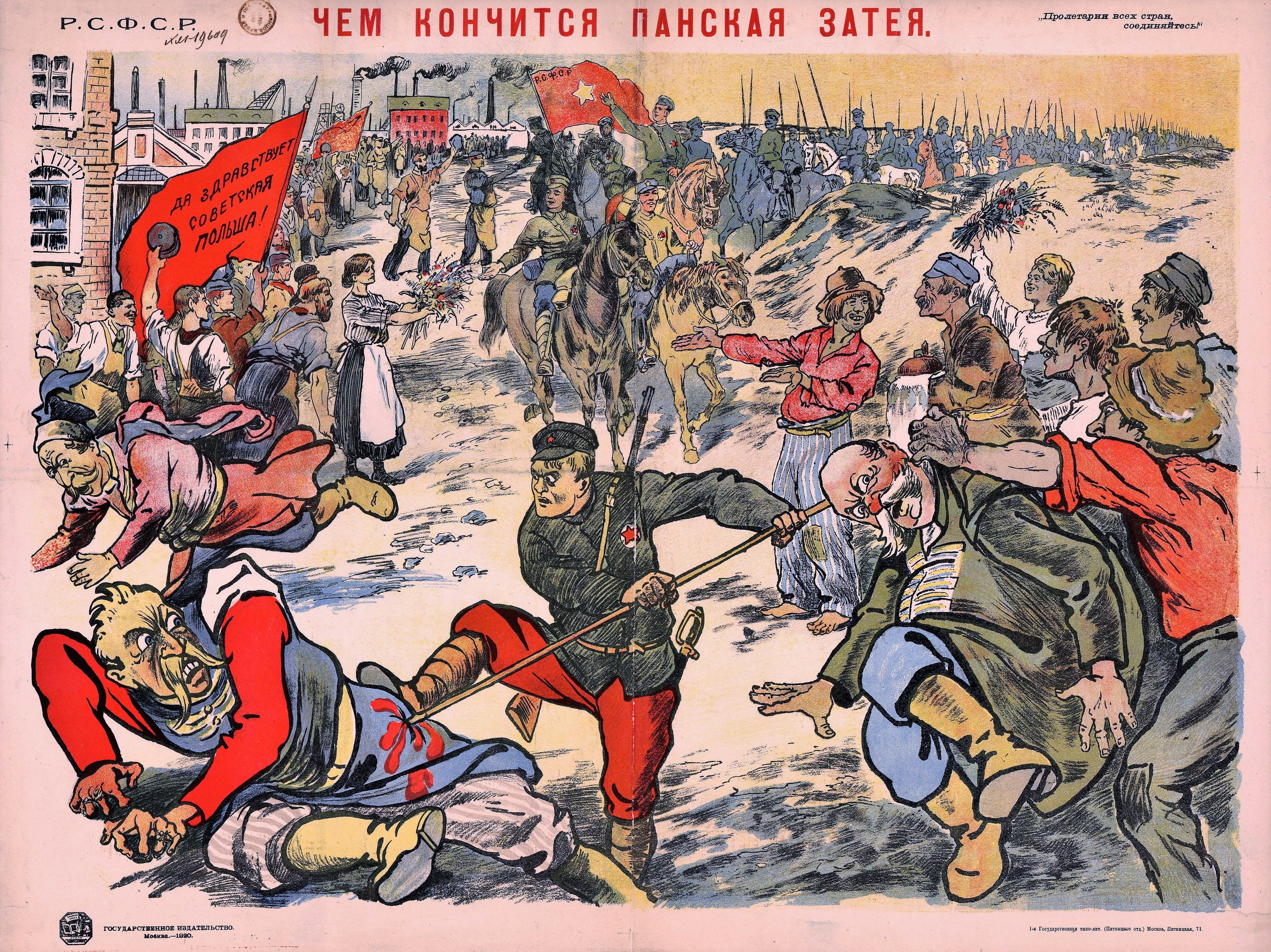
Anti-Polish Soviet propaganda poster, 1920

The Soviet westward offensive of 1918–1919 occurred at the same time as the general Soviet move into the areas abandoned by the Ober Ost garrisons that were being withdrawn to Germany in the aftermath of World War I. This merged into the 1919–1921 Polish–Soviet War, in which the Red Army invaded Poland, reaching the central part of the country in 1920, but then suffered a resounding defeat in Warsaw, which put an end to the war. During the Polish Campaign the Red Army numbered some 6.5 million men, many of whom the Army had difficulty supporting, around 581,000 in the two operational fronts, western and southwestern. Around 2.5 million men and women were mobilized in the interior as part of reserve armies.

=== Reorganization ===
The XI Congress of the Russian Communist Party (Bolsheviks) (RCP (b)) adopted a resolution on the strengthening of the Red Army. It decided to establish strictly organized military, educational and economic conditions in the army. However, it was recognized that an army of 1,600,000 would be burdensome. By the end of 1922, after the Congress, the Party Central Committee decided to reduce the Red Army to 800,000. This reduction necessitated the reorganization of the Red Army's structure. The supreme military unit became corps of two or three divisions. Divisions consisted of three regiments. Brigades as independent units were abolished. The formation of departments' rifle corps began.

=== Doctrinal development in the 1920s and 1930s ===
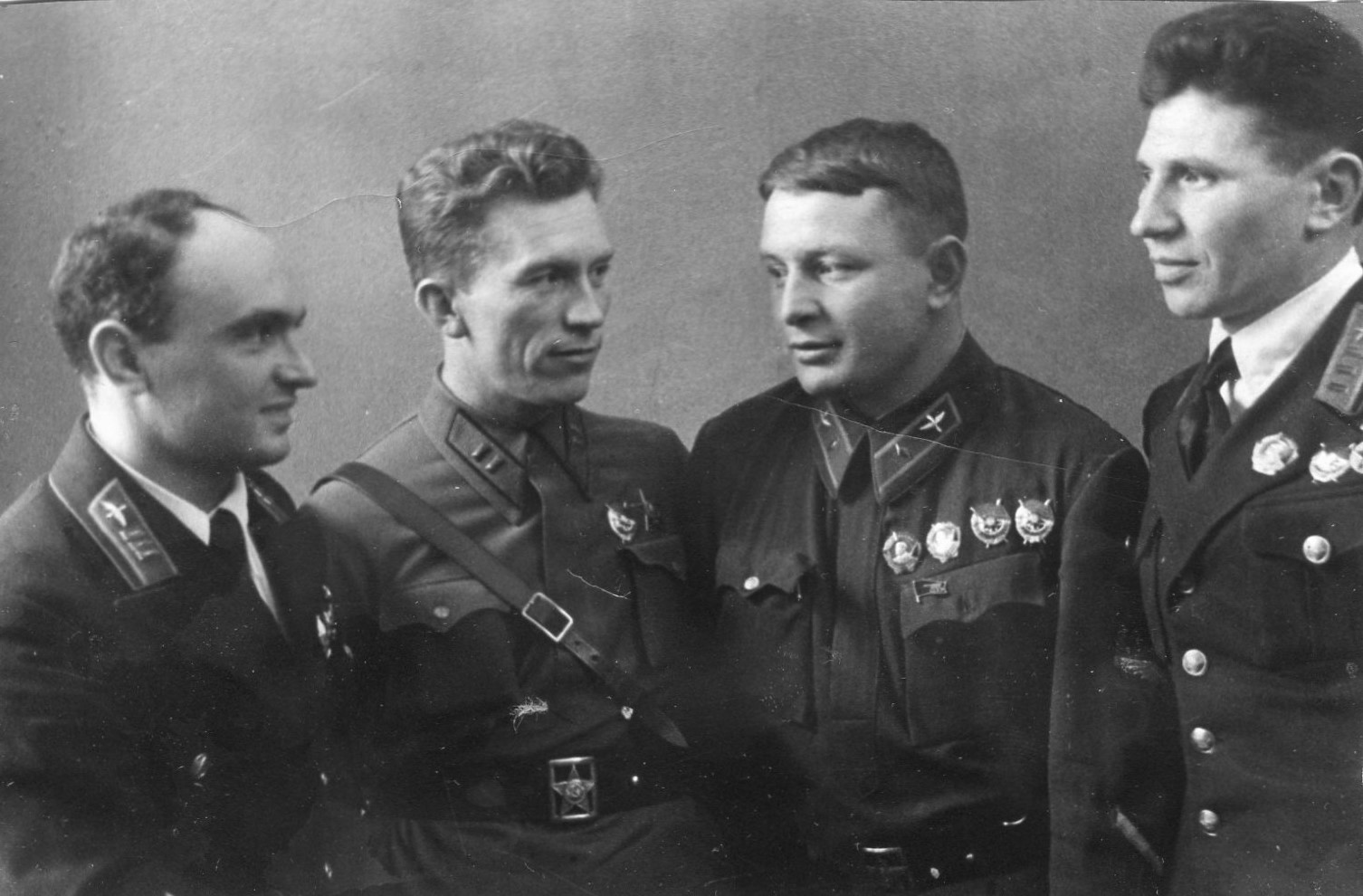
Soviet officers, 1938. Brigade commander Pavel Rychagov is second from the right.

After four years of warfare, the Red Army's defeat of Pyotr Wrangel in the south in 1920 allowed the foundation of the Union of Soviet Socialist Republics in December 1922. Historian John Erickson sees 1 February 1924, when Mikhail Frunze became head of the Red Army staff, as marking the ascent of the general staff, which came to dominate Soviet military planning and operations. By 1 October 1924 the Red Army's strength had diminished to 530,000. The list of Soviet divisions 1917–1945 details the formations of the Red Army in that time.

In the late 1920s and throughout the 1930s, Soviet military theoreticians – led by Marshal Mikhail Tukhachevsky – developed the deep operation doctrine, a direct consequence of their experiences in the Polish–Soviet War and in the Russian Civil War. To achieve victory, deep operations envisage simultaneous corps- and army-size unit maneuvers of simultaneous parallel attacks throughout the depth of the enemy's ground forces, inducing catastrophic defensive failure. The deep-battle doctrine relies upon aviation and armor advances with the expectation that maneuver warfare offers quick, efficient, and decisive victory. Marshal Tukhachevsky said that aerial warfare must be "employed against targets beyond the range of infantry, artillery, and other arms. For maximum tactical effect aircraft should be employed en masse, concentrated in time and space, against targets of the highest tactical importance."

"To the Red army, Stalin has dealt a fearful blow. As a result of the latest judicial frameup, it has fallen several cubits in stature. The interests of the Soviet defense have been sacrificed in the interests of the self-preservation of the ruling clique."

— Trotsky on the Red Army purges of 1937.

Red Army deep operations found their first formal expression in the 1929 Field Regulations and became codified in the 1936 Provisional Field Regulations (PU-36). The Great Purge of 1937–1939 and the 1941 Red Army Purge removed many leading officers from the Red Army, including Tukhachevsky himself and many of his followers, and the doctrine was abandoned. Thus, at the Battle of Lake Khasan in 1938 and in the Battle of Khalkhin Gol in 1939 (major border conflicts with the Imperial Japanese Army), the doctrine was not used. Only in the Second World War did deep operations come into play.

=== Chinese–Soviet conflicts ===
The Red Army was involved in armed conflicts in the Republic of China during the Sino-Soviet conflict (1929), the Soviet invasion of Xinjiang (1934), when it was assisted by White Russian forces, and the Islamic rebellion in Xinjiang (1937) in Northwestern China. The Red Army achieved its objectives; it maintained effective control over the Manchurian Chinese Eastern Railway, and successfully installed a pro-Soviet regime in Xinjiang.

=== Soviet–Japanese border conflicts ===
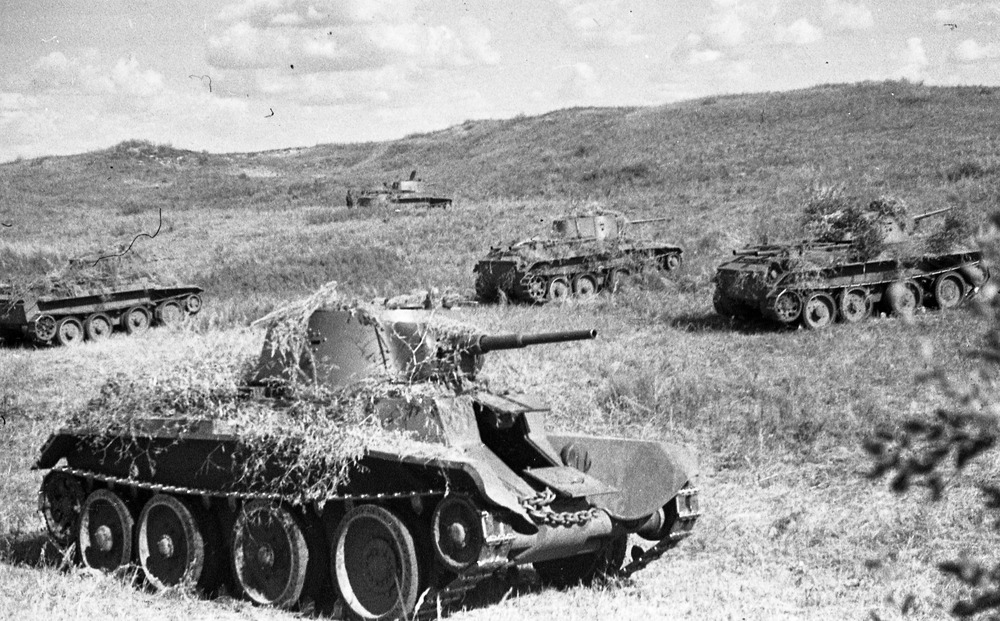
Soviet tanks during the Battles of Khalkhin Gol, August 1939

The Soviet–Japanese border conflicts, also known as the "Soviet–Japanese Border War" or the first "Soviet–Japanese War", was a series of minor and major conflicts fought between the Soviet Union and the Empire of Japan from 1932 to 1939. Japan's expansion into Northeast China created a common border between Japanese controlled areas and the Soviet Far East and Mongolia. The Soviets and Japanese, including their respective client states of the Mongolian People's Republic and Manchukuo, disputed the boundaries and accused the other side of border violations. This resulted in a series of escalating border skirmishes and punitive expeditions, including the 1938 Battle of Lake Khasan, and culminated in the Red Army finally achieving a Soviet-Mongolian victory over Japan and Manchukuo at the Battles of Khalkhin Gol in September 1939. The Soviet Union and Japan agreed to a ceasefire. Later the two sides signed the Soviet–Japanese Neutrality Pact on 13 April 1941, which resolved the dispute and returned the borders to status quo ante bellum.

=== Winter War with Finland ===
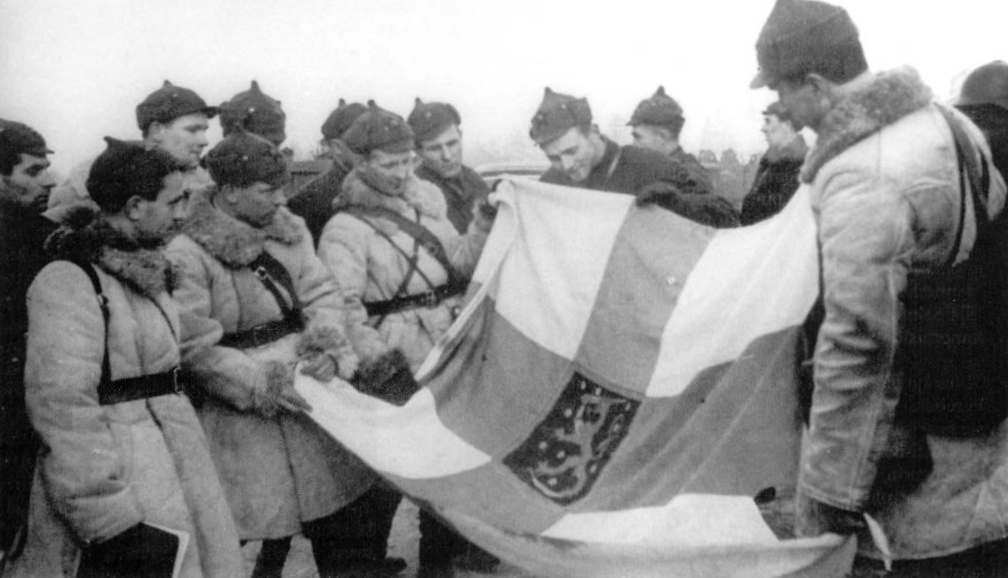
Red Army soldiers display a captured Finnish banner, March 1940

The Winter War (Finnish: talvisota, Swedish: finska vinterkriget, Russian: Зи́мняя война́) (Note: The names "Soviet–Finnish War 1939–1940" (Russian: Сове́тско-финская война́ 1939–1940) and "Soviet–Finland War 1939–1940" (Russian: Сове́тско-финляндская война́ 1939–1940) are often used in Russian historiography.) was a war between the Soviet Union and Finland. It began with a Soviet offensive on 30 November 1939 – three months after the start of World War II and the Soviet invasion of Poland. The League of Nations deemed the attack illegal and expelled the Soviet Union on 14 December 1939.

The Soviet forces led by Semyon Timoshenko had three times as many soldiers as the Finns, thirty times as many aircraft, and a hundred times as many tanks. The Red Army, however, had been hindered by Soviet leader Joseph Stalin's Great Purge of 1937, reducing the army's morale and efficiency shortly before the outbreak of the fighting. With over 30,000 of its army officers executed or imprisoned, most of whom were from the highest ranks, the Red Army in 1939 had many inexperienced senior officers. Because of these factors, and high commitment and morale in the Finnish forces, Finland was able to resist the Soviet invasion for much longer than the Soviets expected. Finnish forces inflicted stunning losses on the Red Army for the first three months of the war while suffering very few losses themselves.

Hostilities ceased in March 1940 with the signing of the Moscow Peace Treaty. Finland ceded 9% of its pre-war territory and 30% of its economic assets to the Soviet Union. Soviet losses on the front were heavy, and the country's international reputation suffered. The Soviet forces did not accomplish their objective of the total conquest of Finland but did receive territory in Karelia, Petsamo, and Salla. The Finns retained their sovereignty and improved their international reputation, which bolstered their morale in the Continuation War (also known as the "Second Soviet-Finnish War") which was a conflict fought by Finland and Germany against the Soviet Union from 1941 to 1944.

=== Second World War ("The Great Patriotic War") ===
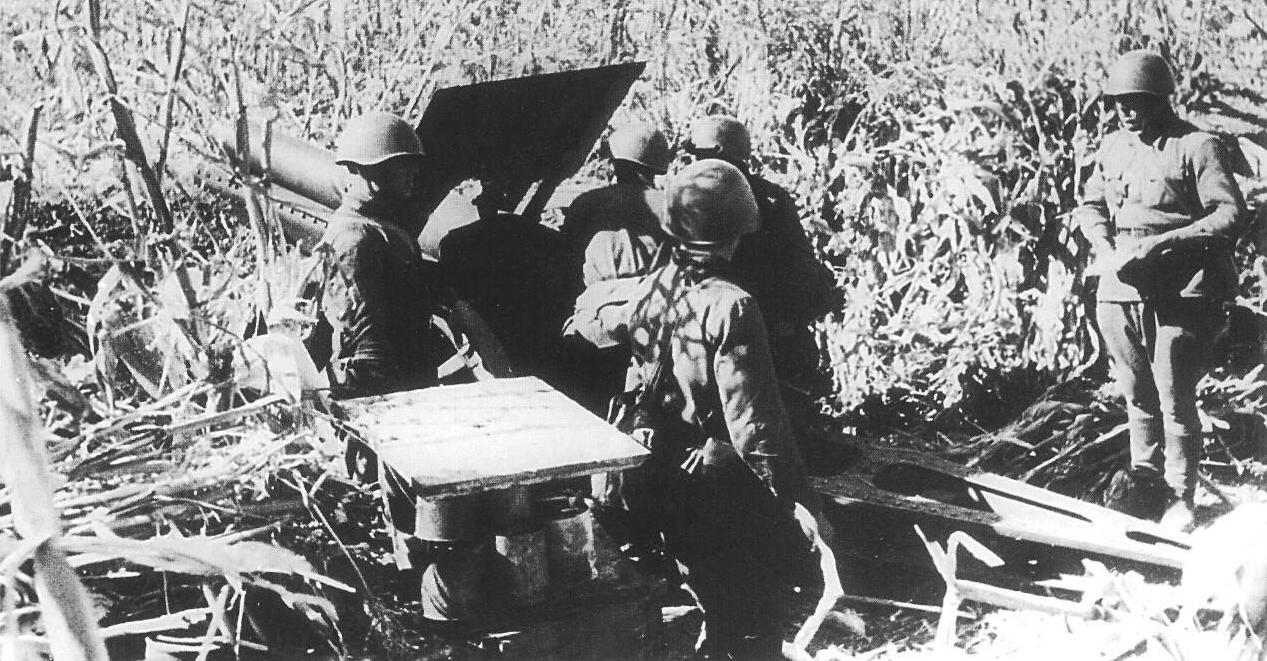
Soviet gun crew in action during the siege of Odessa, July 1941

In accordance with the Soviet-Nazi Molotov–Ribbentrop Pact of 23 August 1939, the Red Army invaded Poland on 17 September 1939, after the Nazi invasion on 1 September 1939. On 30 November, the Red Army also attacked Finland, in the Winter War of 1939–1940. By autumn 1940, after conquering its portion of Poland, Nazi Germany shared an extensive border with the USSR, with whom it remained neutrally bound by their non-aggression pact and trade agreements. Another consequence of the Molotov-Ribbentrop Pact was the Soviet occupation of Bessarabia and Northern Bukovina, carried out by the Southern Front in June–July 1940 and Soviet occupation of the Baltic states. These conquests also added to the border the Soviet Union shared with Nazi-controlled areas. For Adolf Hitler, the circumstance was no dilemma, because the Drang nach Osten ("Drive towards the East") policy secretly remained in force, culminating on 18 December 1940 with Directive No. 21, Operation Barbarossa, approved on 3 February 1941, and scheduled for mid-May 1941.

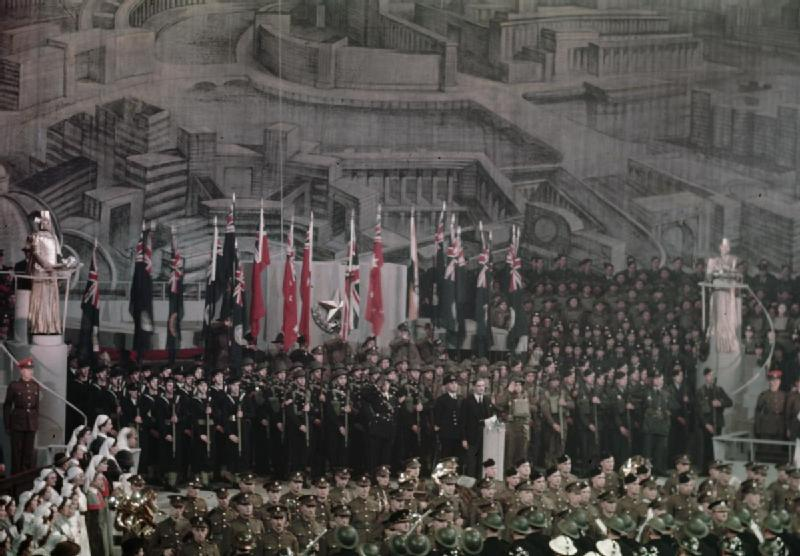
Salute to the Red Army at the Royal Albert Hall, London in February 1943

When Germany invaded the Soviet Union in June 1941, in Operation Barbarossa, the Red Army's ground forces had 303 divisions and 22 separate brigades (5.5 million soldiers) including 166 divisions and brigades (2.6 million) garrisoned in the western military districts. The Axis forces deployed on the Eastern Front consisted of 181 divisions and 18 brigades (3 million soldiers). Three Fronts, the Northwestern, Western, and Southwestern conducted the defense of the western borders of the USSR. In the first weeks of the Great Patriotic War (as it is known in Russia), the Wehrmacht defeated many Red Army units. The Red Army lost millions of men as prisoners and lost much of its pre-war matériel. Stalin increased mobilization, and by 1 August 1941, despite 46 divisions lost in combat, the Red Army's strength was 401 divisions.

The Soviet forces were apparently unprepared despite numerous warnings from a variety of sources. They suffered much damage in the field because of mediocre officers, partial mobilization, and an incomplete reorganization. The hasty pre-war forces expansion and the over-promotion of inexperienced officers (owing to the purging of experienced officers) favored the Wehrmacht in combat. The Axis's numeric superiority rendered the combatants' divisional strength approximately equal. (Note: The Axis forces possessed a 1:1.7 superiority in personnel, despite the Red Army's 174 divisions against the Axis's 164 divisions, a 1.1:1 ratio.) A generation of Soviet commanders (notably Georgy Zhukov) learned from the defeats, and Soviet victories in the Battle of Moscow, at Stalingrad, Kursk and later in Operation Bagration proved decisive.

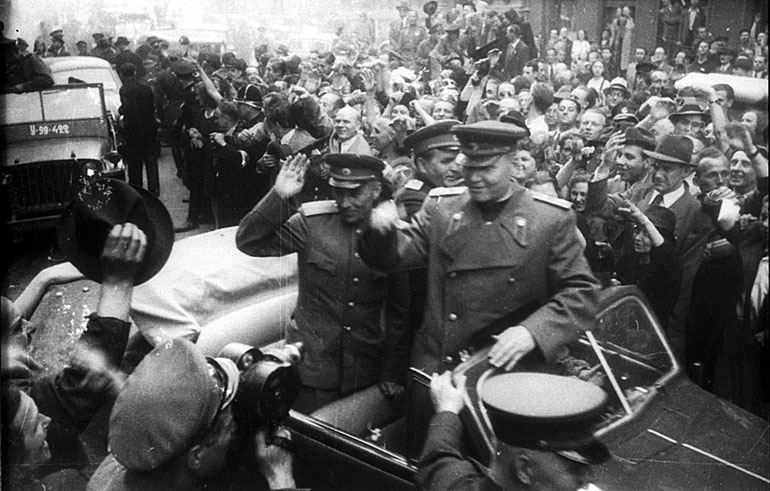
Ivan Konev at the capture of Prague by the Red Army in May 1945

In 1941, the Soviet government raised the bloodied Red Army's esprit de corps with propaganda stressing the defense of Motherland and nation, employing historic exemplars of Russian courage and bravery against foreign aggressors. The anti-Nazi Great Patriotic War was conflated with the Patriotic War of 1812 against Napoleon, and historical Russian military heroes, such as Alexander Nevsky and Mikhail Kutuzov, appeared. Repression of the Russian Orthodox Church temporarily ceased, and priests revived the tradition of blessing arms before battle.

To encourage the initiative of Red Army commanders, the CPSU temporarily abolished political commissars, reintroduced formal military ranks and decorations, and introduced the Guards unit concept. Exceptionally heroic or high-performing units earned the Guards title (for example 58th Guards Rifle Division), an elite designation denoting superior training, materiel, and pay.

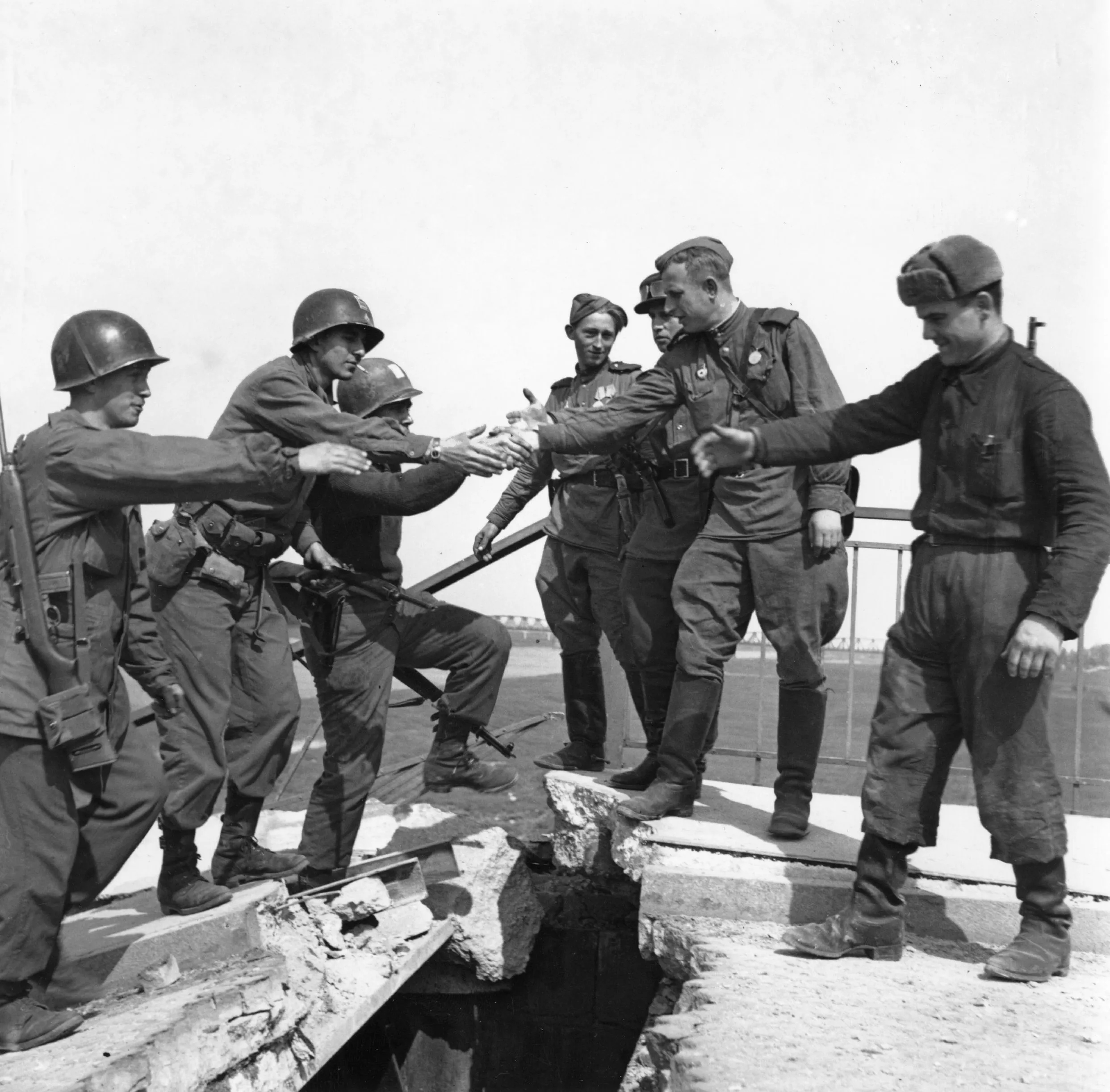
Soviet Lt. Charles Thau of the 58th Guards Rifle Division (center, looking into camera) behind the handshake, with U.S. 69th Infantry PFC Bernard E. Kirschenbaum (left center tallest figure), 25 April 1945

Punishment also was used; slackers, malingerers, those avoiding combat with self-inflicted wounds cowards, thieves, and deserters were disciplined with beatings, demotions, undesirable/dangerous duties, and summary execution by NKVD punitive detachments.

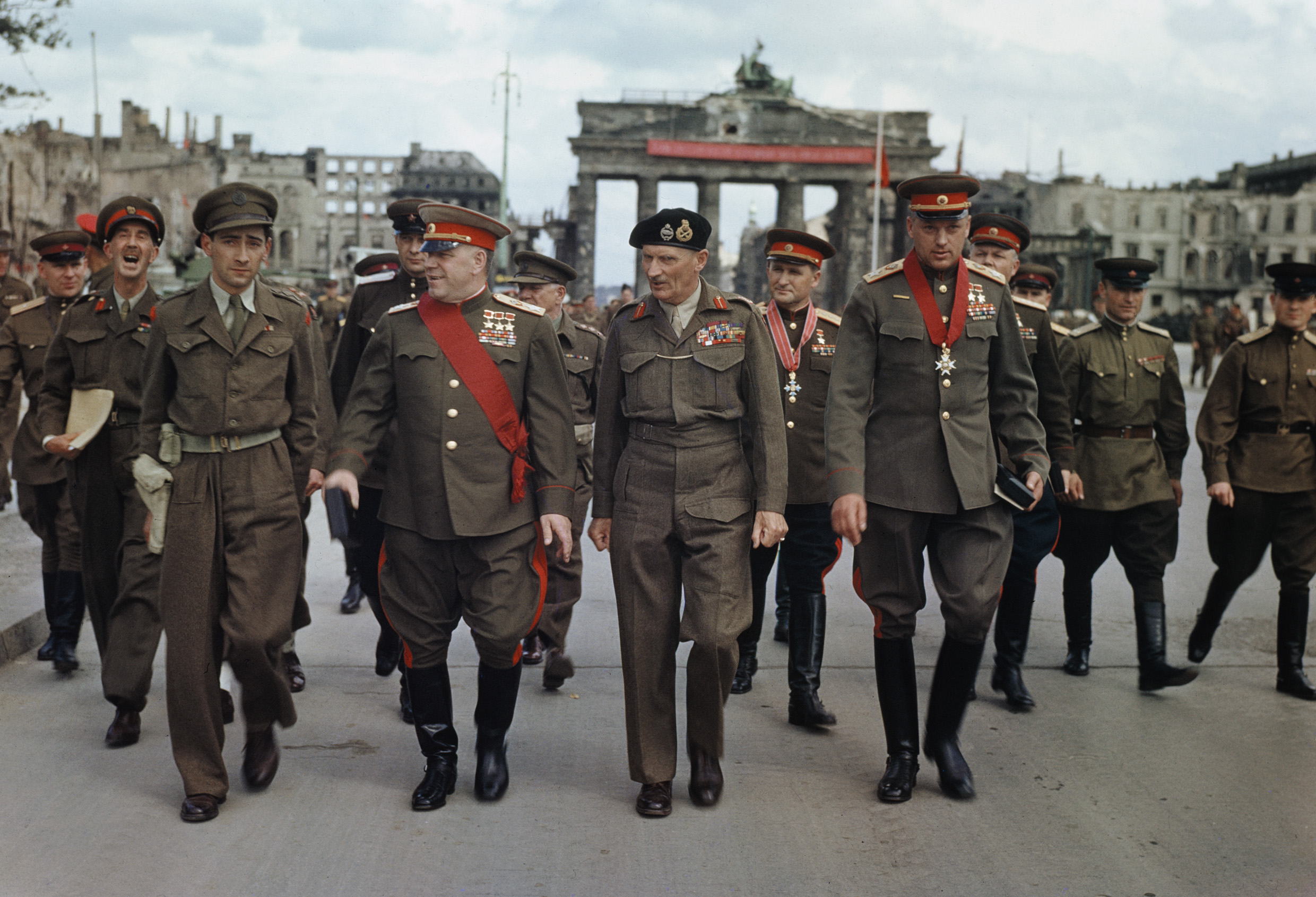
Marshals Zhukov and Rokossovsky with General Sokolovsky leave the Brandenburg Gate after being decorated by Field Marshal Montgomery

At the same time, the osobist (NKVD military counter-intelligence officer) became a key Red Army figure with the power to condemn to death and to spare the life of any soldier and (almost any) officer of the unit to which he was attached. In 1942, Stalin established the penal battalions composed of gulag inmates, Soviet POWs, disgraced soldiers, and deserters. In addition to dangerous military assignments, the penal troops could be used for hazardous front-line duties, e.g., as tramplers clearing Nazi minefields. Given the dangers, the maximum sentence was three months. Likewise, the Soviet treatment of Red Army personnel who had been taken prisoner by the enemy was especially harsh. Per a 1941 Stalin directive, Red Army officers and soldiers were to "fight to the last" rather than surrender; Stalin stated: "There are no Soviet prisoners of war, only traitors." During and after World War II freed PoWs went to special "filtration camps". Of these ex-PoWs, by 1944, more than 90% were cleared, and about 8% were arrested or condemned to serve in penal battalions. In 1944, they were sent directly to reserve military formations to be cleared by the NKVD. Further, in 1945, about 100 filtration camps were set up for repatriated POWs and other displaced persons, which processed more than 4,000,000 people. By 1946, 80% civilians and 20% of ex-PoWs were freed, 5% of civilians, and 43% of PoWs were re-drafted, 10% of civilians and 22% of ex-PoWs were sent to labor battalions, and 2% of civilians and 15% of ex-PoWs (226,127 out of 1,539,475 total) were transferred to the Gulag.

Red Army victory banner, raised above the German Reichstag in May 1945

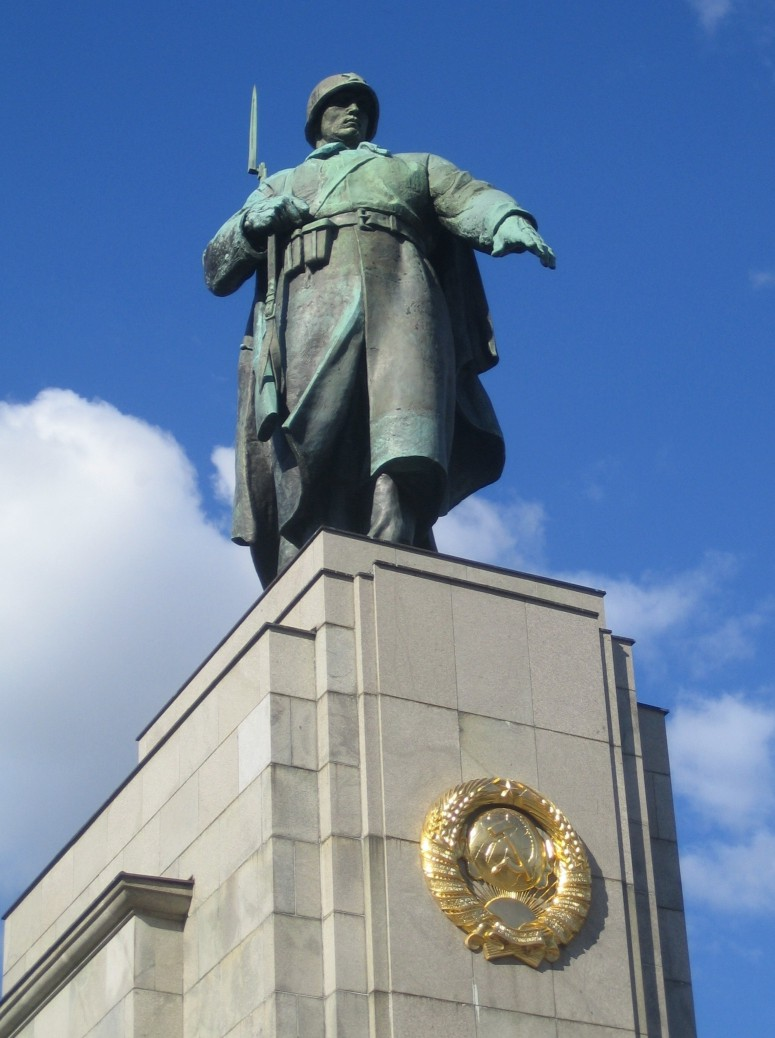
Monument to the Red Army, Berlin

During the Great Patriotic War, the Red Army conscripted 29,574,900 men in addition to the 4,826,907 in service at the beginning of the war. Of this total of 34,401,807 it lost 6,329,600 killed in action (KIA), 555,400 deaths by disease and 4,559,000 missing in action (MIA) (most captured). Of the 4.5 million missing, 939,700 rejoined the ranks in the subsequently liberated Soviet territory, and a further 1,836,000 returned from German captivity. Thus the grand total of losses amounted to 8,668,400, of which the majority were ethnic Russians (5,756,000), followed by ethnic Ukrainians (1,377,400). This is the official total dead, but other estimates give the number of total dead up to almost 11 million men, including 7.7 million killed or missing in action and 2.6 million prisoners of war (POW) dead (out of 5.2 million total POWs), plus 400,000 paramilitary and Soviet partisan losses. Officials at the Russian Central Defense Ministry Archive (CDMA) maintain that their database lists the names of roughly 14 million dead and missing service personnel. As many as 8 million of the 34 million mobilized were non-Slavic minority soldiers, and around 45 divisions formed from national minorities served from 1941 to 1943.

The German losses on the Eastern Front consisted of an estimated 3,604,800 KIA/MIA within the 1937 borders plus 900,000 ethnic Germans and Austrians outside the 1937 border (included in these numbers are men listed as missing in action or unaccounted for after the war) and 3,576,300 men reported captured (total 8,081,100); the losses of the German satellites on the Eastern Front approximated 668,163 KIA/MIA and 799,982 captured (total 1,468,145). Of these 9,549,245, the Soviets released 3,572,600 from captivity after the war, thus the grand total of the Axis losses came to an estimated 5,976,645. Regarding POWs, both sides captured large numbers and had many die in captivity – one recent British figure says 3.6 of 6 million Soviet POWs died in German camps, while 300,000 of 3 million German POWs died in Soviet hands.

==== Shortcomings ====
In 1941, the rapid progress of the initial German air and land attacks into the Soviet Union made Red Army logistical support difficult because many depots (and most of the USSR's industrial manufacturing base) lay in the country's invaded western areas, obliging their re-establishment east of the Ural Mountains. Lend-Lease trucks and jeeps from the United States began appearing in large numbers in 1942. Until then, the Red Army was often required to improvise or go without weapons, vehicles, and other equipment. The 1941 decision to physically move their manufacturing capacity east of the Ural Mountains kept the main Soviet support system out of German reach. In the later stages of the war, the Red Army fielded some excellent weaponry, especially artillery and tanks. The Red Army's heavy KV-1 and medium T-34 tanks outclassed most Wehrmacht armor, but in 1941, most Soviet tank units used older and inferior models.

==== Lend-Lease ====
The Red Army was financially and materially assisted in its wartime effort by the United States and the British Empire. In total, the U.S. deliveries to the USSR through Lend-Lease amounted to $11 billion in materials ($180 billion in the 2020 money value): over 400,000 jeeps and trucks; 12,000 armored vehicles (including 7,000 tanks, about 1,386 of which were M3 Lees and 4,102 M4 Shermans); 14,015 aircraft (of which 4,719 were Bell P-39 Airacobras, 2,908 were Douglas A-20 Havocs, and 2,400 were Bell P-63 Kingcobras) and 1.75 million tons of food.

==== Wartime rape ====
Soviet soldiers committed mass rapes in occupied territories, especially in Germany. The wartime rapes were followed by decades of silence. According to historian Antony Beevor, whose books were banned in 2015 from some Russian schools and colleges, NKVD (Soviet secret police) files have revealed that the leadership knew what was happening, but did little to stop it. It was often rear echelon units who committed the rapes. According to professor Oleg Rzheshevsky, "4,148 Red Army officers and many privates were punished for committing atrocities". The exact number of German women and girls raped by Soviet troops during the war and occupation is uncertain, but historians estimate their numbers are likely in the hundreds of thousands, and possibly as many as two million.

=== Soviet–Japanese War (1945) ===
While the Soviets considered the surrender of Germany to be the end of the "Great Patriotic War", at the earlier Yalta Conference the Soviet Union agreed to enter the Pacific Theater portion of World War II within three months of the end of the war in Europe. This promise was reaffirmed at the Potsdam Conference held in July 1945.

The Red Army began the Soviet invasion of Manchuria on 9 August 1945 (three days after the first atomic bombing of Hiroshima and the same day the second atomic bomb was dropped on Nagasaki, while also being exact three months after the surrender of Germany). It was the largest campaign of the Soviet–Japanese War, which resumed hostilities between the Union of Soviet Socialist Republics and the Empire of Japan after almost six years of peace following the 1932–1939 Soviet–Japanese border conflicts. The Red Army, with support from Mongolian forces, overwhelmed the Japanese Kwantung Army and local Chinese forces supporting them. The Soviets advanced on the continent into the Japanese puppet state of Manchukuo, Mengjiang (the northeast section of present-day Inner Mongolia which was part of another puppet state) and via an amphibious operation the northern portion of Korea. Other Red Army operations included the Soviet invasion of South Sakhalin, which was the Japanese portion of Sakhalin Island (and Russia had lost to Japan in 1905 in the aftermath of the Russo-Japanese War), and the invasion of the Kuril Islands. Emperor Hirohito announced the surrender of Japan on 15 August. The commanding general of the Kwantung Army ordered a surrender the following day although some Japanese units continued to fight for several more days. A proposed Soviet invasion of Hokkaido, the second largest Japanese island, was originally planned to be part of the territory to be taken but it was cancelled.

== Administration ==
Military administration after the October Revolution was taken over by the People's Commissariat of War and Marine affairs headed by a collective committee of Vladimir Antonov-Ovseyenko, Pavel Dybenko, and Nikolai Krylenko. At the same time, Nikolay Dukhonin was acting as the Supreme Commander-in-Chief after Alexander Kerensky fled from Russia. On 12 November 1917, the Soviet government appointed Krylenko as the Supreme Commander-in-Chief, and because of an "accident" during the forceful displacement of the commander-in-chief, Dukhonin was killed on 20 November 1917. Nikolai Podvoisky was appointed as the Narkom of War Affairs, leaving Dybenko in charge of the Narkom of Marine Affairs and Ovseyenko – the expeditionary forces to the Southern Russia on 28 November 1917. The Bolsheviks also sent out their own representatives to replace front commanders of the Russian Imperial Army.

After the signing of Treaty of Brest-Litovsk on 3 March 1918, a major reshuffling took place in the Soviet military administration. On 13 March 1918, the Soviet government accepted the official resignation of Krylenko and the post of Supreme Commander-in-Chief was liquidated. On 14 March 1918, Leon Trotsky replaced Podvoisky as the Narkom of War Affairs. On 16 March 1918, Pavel Dybenko was relieved from the office of Narkom of Marine Affairs. On 8 May 1918, the All-Russian Chief Headquarters was created, headed by Nikolai Stogov and later Alexander Svechin.

On 2 September 1918, the Revolutionary Military Council (RMC) was established as the main military administration under Leon Trotsky, the Narkom of War Affairs. On 6 September 1918, alongside the chief headquarters, the Field Headquarters of RMC was created, initially headed by Nikolai Rattel. On the same day the office of the Commander-in-Chief of the Armed Forces was created, and initially assigned to Jukums Vācietis (and from July 1919 to Sergey Kamenev). The Commander-in-Chief of the Armed Forces existed until April 1924, the end of Russian Civil War.

In November 1923, after the establishment of the Soviet Union, the Council of People's Commissars on War and Navy Affairs was transformed into the People's Commissariat for Military and Naval Affairs.

== Organization ==
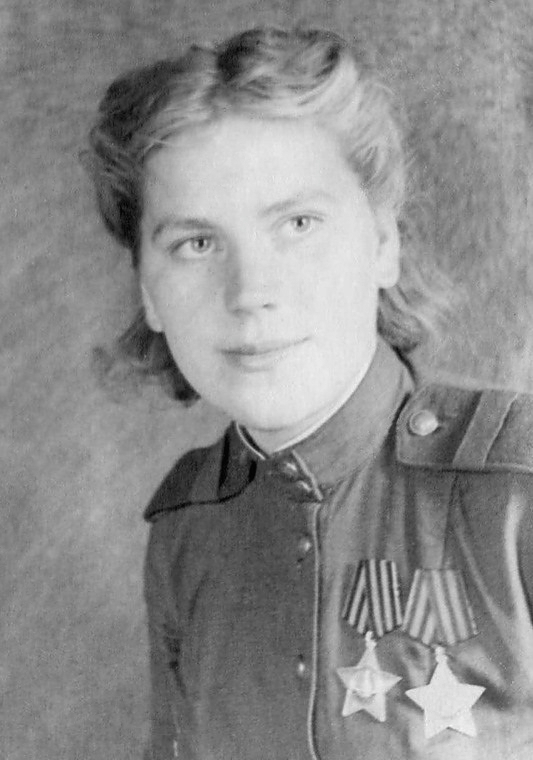
Roza Shanina was a graduate of the Central Women's Sniper Training School credited with 59 confirmed kills.

At the beginning of its existence, the Red Army functioned as a voluntary formation, without ranks or insignia. Democratic elections selected the officers. However, a decree on 29 May 1918 imposed obligatory military service for men of ages 18 to 40. To service the massive draft, the Bolsheviks formed regional military commissariats (voyennyy komissariat, abbr. voyenkomat), which as of 2023 still exist in Russia in this function and under this name. Military commissariats, however, should not be confused with the institution of military political commissars.

In the mid-1920s, the territorial principle of manning the Red Army was introduced. In each region, able-bodied men were called up for a limited period of active duty in territorial units, which constituted about half the army's strength, each year, for five years. The first call-up period was for three months, with one month a year thereafter. A regular cadre provided a stable nucleus. By 1925, this system provided 46 of the 77 infantry divisions and one of the eleven cavalry divisions. The remainder consisted of regular officers and enlisted personnel serving two-year terms. The territorial system was finally abolished, with all remaining formations converted to the other cadre divisions, in 1937–1938.

=== Mechanization ===
The Soviet military received ample funding and was innovative in its technology. An American journalist wrote in 1941:

Even in American terms the Soviet defence budget was large. In 1940 it was the equivalent of $11,000,000,000, and represented one-third of the national expenditure. Measure this against the fact that the infinitely richer United States will approximate the expenditure of that much yearly only in 1942 after two years of its greatest defence effort.

Most of the money spent on the Red Army and Air Force went for machines of war. Twenty-three years ago when the Bolshevik Revolution took place there were few machines in Russia. Marx said Communism must come in a highly industrialized society. The Bolsheviks identified their dreams of socialist happiness with machines which would multiply production and reduce hours of labour until everyone would have everything he needed and would work only as much as he wished. Somehow this has not come about, but the Russians still worship machines, and this helped make the Red Army the most highly mechanized in the world, except perhaps the German Army now.

Like Americans, the Russians admire size, bigness, large numbers. They took pride in building a vast army of tanks, some of them the largest in the world, armored cars, airplanes, motorized guns, and every variety of mechanical weapons.

Under Stalin's campaign for mechanization, the army formed its first mechanized unit in 1930. The 1st Mechanized Brigade consisted of a tank regiment, a motorized infantry regiment, as well as reconnaissance and artillery battalions. From this humble beginning, the Soviets would go on to create the first operational-level armored formations in history, the 11th and 45th Mechanized Corps, in 1932. These were tank-heavy formations with combat support forces included so they could survive while operating in enemy rear areas without support from a parent front.

Impressed by the German campaign of 1940 against France, the Soviet People's Commissariat of Defence (Defence Ministry, Russian abbreviation NKO) ordered the creation of nine mechanized corps on 6 July 1940. Between February and March 1941, the NKO ordered another twenty to be created. All of these formations were larger than those theorized by Tukhachevsky. Even though the Red Army's 29 mechanized corps had an authorized strength of no less than 29,899 tanks by 1941, they proved to be a paper tiger. There were actually only 17,000 tanks available at the time, meaning several of the new mechanized corps were badly under strength. The pressure placed on factories and military planners to show production numbers also led to a situation where the majority of armored vehicles were obsolescent models, critically lacking in spare parts and support equipment, and nearly three-quarters were overdue for major maintenance. By 22 June 1941, there were only 1,475 of the modern T-34s and KV series tanks available to the Red Army, and these were too dispersed along the front to provide enough mass for even local success. To illustrate this, the 3rd Mechanized Corps in Lithuania was formed up of a total of 460 tanks; 109 of these were newer KV-1s and T-34s. This corps would prove to be one of the lucky few with a substantial number of newer tanks. However, the 4th Army was composed of 518 tanks, all of which were the obsolete T-26, as opposed to the authorized strength of 1,031 newer medium tanks. This problem was universal throughout the Red Army and would play a crucial role in the initial defeats of the Red Army in 1941 at the hands of the German armed forces.

=== Wartime ===
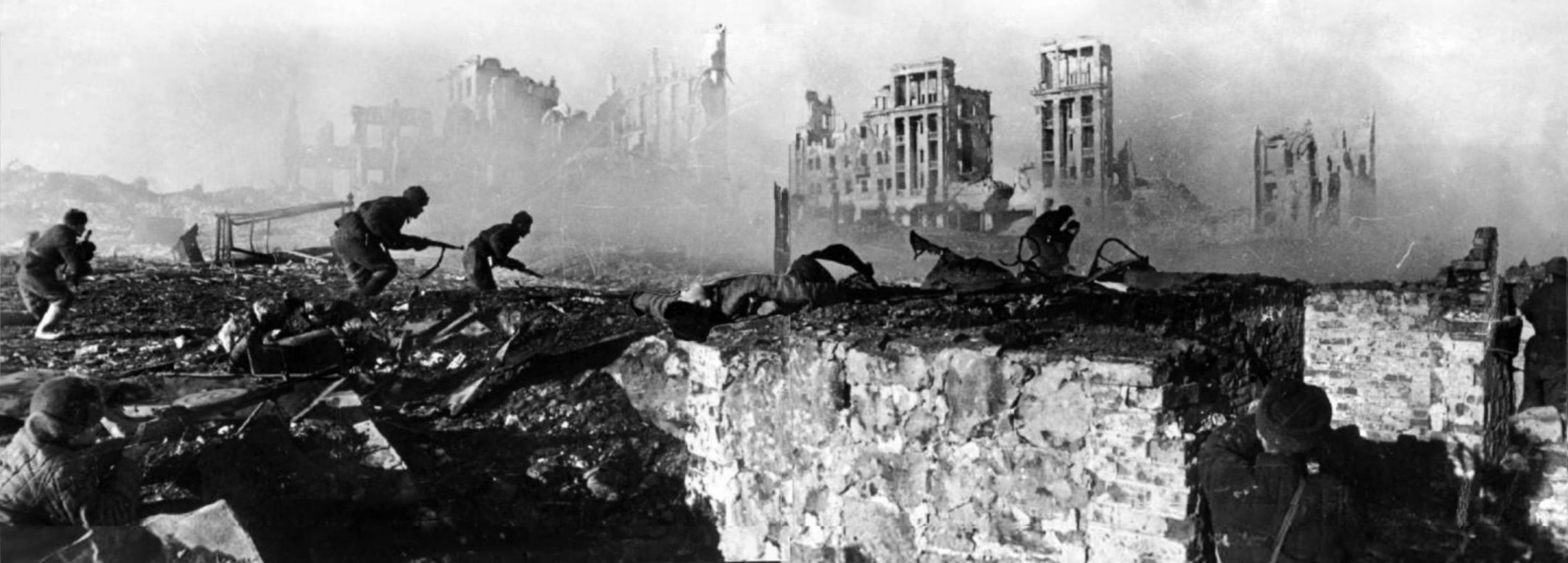
The Battle of Stalingrad is considered by many historians as a decisive turning point of World War II.

War experience prompted changes to the way frontline forces were organized. Following six months of combat against the Germans, the Stavka abolished the rifle corps which was intermediate between the army and division level because, while useful in theory, in the state of the Red Army in 1941, they proved ineffective in practice. Following the decisive victory in the Battle of Moscow in January 1942, the high command began to reintroduce rifle corps into its more experienced formations. The total number of rifle corps started at 62 on 22 June 1941, dropped to six by 1 January 1942, but then increased to 34 by February 1943, and 161 by New Year's Day 1944. Actual strengths of front-line rifle divisions, authorized to contain 11,000 men in July 1941, were mostly no more than 50% of establishment strengths during 1941, and divisions were often worn down, because of continuous operations, to hundreds of men or even less.

On the outbreak of war, the Red Army deployed mechanized corps and tank divisions whose development has been described above. The initial German attack destroyed many and, in the course of 1941, virtually all of them, (barring two in the Transbaikal Military District). The remnants were disbanded. It was much easier to coordinate smaller forces, and separate tank brigades and battalions were substituted. It was late 1942 and early 1943 before larger tank formations of corps size were fielded to employ armor in mass again. By mid-1943, these corps were being grouped together into tank armies whose strength by the end of the war could be up to 700 tanks and 50,000 men.

== Personnel ==
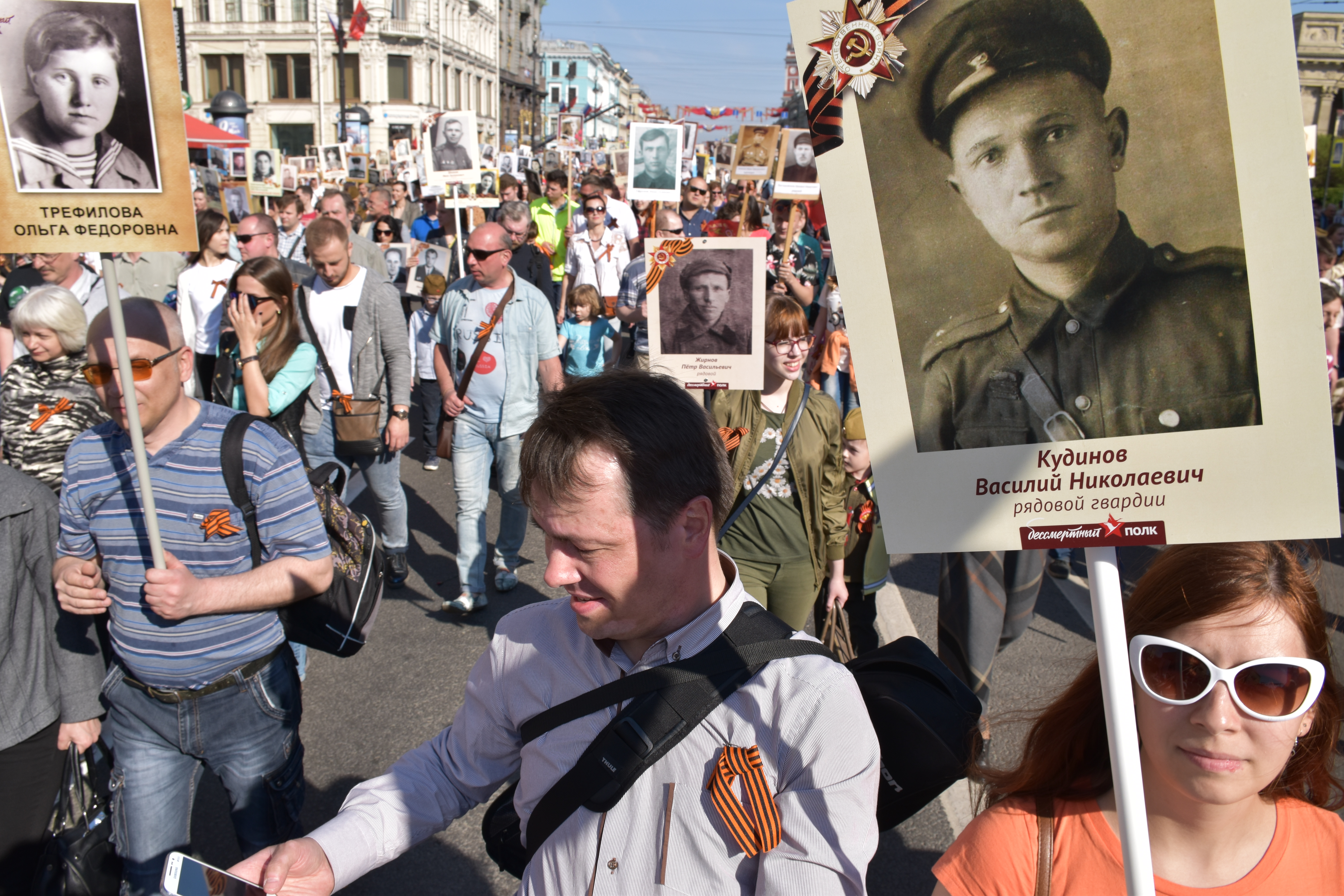
People in Saint Petersburg at the Immortal Regiment, carrying portraits of their ancestors who fought in World War II.

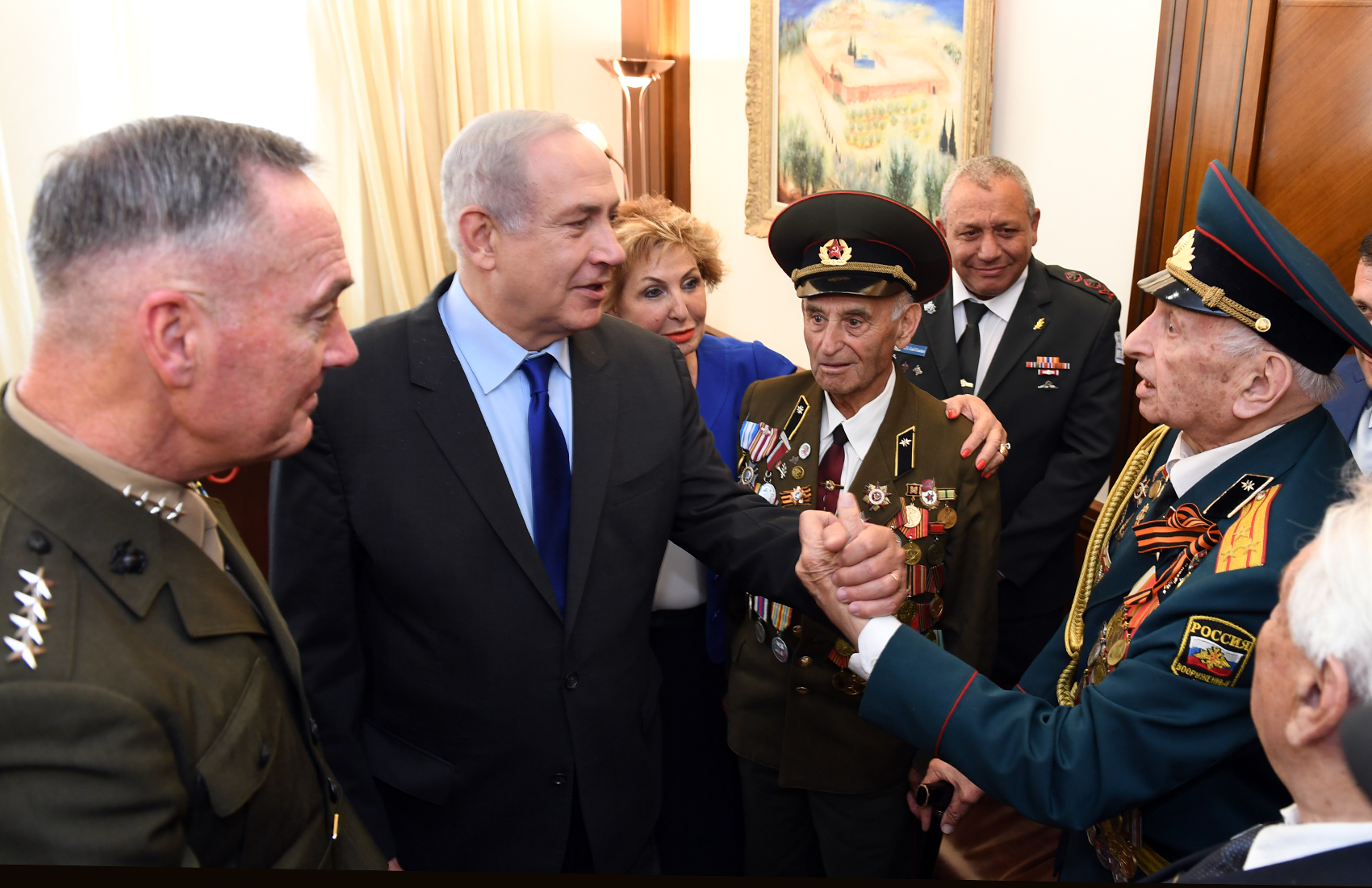
Benjamin Netanyahu and Red Army's Jewish veterans, Victory Day in Jerusalem, 9 May 2017

The Bolshevik authorities assigned to every unit of the Red Army a political commissar, or politruk, who had the authority to override unit commanders' decisions if they ran counter to the principles of the Communist Party. The Party leadership considered political control over the military absolutely necessary, as the army relied more and more on officers from the pre-revolutionary Imperial period and understandably feared a military coup. This system was abolished in 1925, as there were by that time enough trained Communist officers to render the counter-signing unnecessary.

=== Ranks and titles ===
The early Red Army abandoned the institution of a professional officer corps as a "heritage of tsarism" in the course of the Revolution. In particular, the Bolsheviks condemned the use of the word officer and used the word commander instead. The Red Army abandoned epaulettes and ranks, using purely functional titles such as "Division Commander", "Corps Commander", and similar titles. Insignia for these functional titles existed, consisting of triangles, squares and rhombuses (so-called "diamonds").

In 1924 (2 October), "personal" or "service" categories were introduced, from K1 (section leader, assistant squad leader, senior rifleman, etc.) to K14 (field commander, army commander, military district commander, army commissar and equivalent). Service category insignia again consisted of triangles, squares and rhombuses, but also rectangles (1 – 3, for categories from K7 to K9).

On 22 September 1935, the Red Army abandoned service categories and introduced personal ranks. These ranks, however, used a unique mix of functional titles and traditional ranks. For example, the ranks included "Lieutenant" and "Comdiv" (Комдив, Division Commander). Further complications ensued from the functional and categorical ranks for political officers (e.g., "brigade commissar", "army commissar 2nd rank"), for technical corps (e.g., "engineer 3rd rank", "division engineer"), and for administrative, medical and other non-combatant branches.

The Marshal of the Soviet Union (Маршал Советского Союза) rank was introduced on 22 September 1935. On 7 May 1940 further modifications to rationalise the system of ranks were made on the proposal by Marshal Voroshilov: the ranks of "General" and "Admiral" replaced the senior functional ranks of Combrig, Comdiv, Comcor, Comandarm in the Red Army and Flagman 1st rank etc. in the Red Navy; the other senior functional ranks ("division commissar", "division engineer", etc.) remained unaffected. The arm or service distinctions remained (e.g., general of the cavalry, marshal of armoured troops). For the most part the new system restored that used by the Imperial Russian Army at the conclusion of its participation in World War I.

In early 1943, a unification of the system saw the abolition of all the remaining functional ranks. The word "officer" became officially endorsed, together with the use of epaulettes, which superseded the previous rank insignia. The ranks and insignia of 1943 did not change much until the last days of the USSR; the contemporary Russian Army uses largely the same system.

=== Military education ===
Kursants (cadets) of the Red Army Artillery School in Chuhuyiv, Ukraine, 1933

During the Civil War the commander cadres were trained at the Nicholas General Staff Academy of the Russian Empire, which became the Frunze Military Academy in the 1920s. Senior and supreme commanders were trained at the Higher Military Academic Courses, renamed the Advanced Courses for Supreme Command in 1925. The 1931 establishment of an Operations Faculty at the Frunze Military Academy supplemented these courses. The General Staff Academy was reinstated on 2 April 1936, and became the principal military school for the senior and supreme commanders of the Red Army.

=== Purges ===
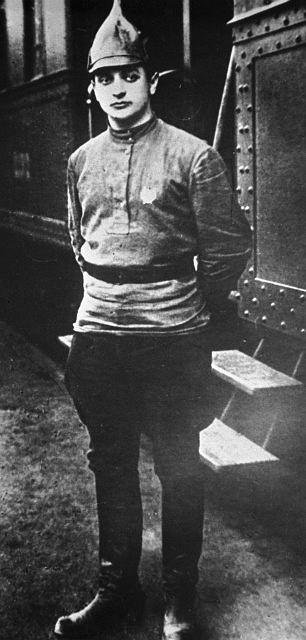
Red Army Marshal Mikhail Tukhachevsky, who was executed during the Great Purge in June 1937. Here in 1920 wearing the budenovka.

According to the new data that emerged on the break of the 21st century, The Vesna Case (also known as "Operation Vesna") of 1930–1931 was massive Soviet repressions targeting former officers and generals of the Russian Imperial Army who had served in the Red Army and Soviet Navy, a major purge of the Red Army preceding the Great Purge. According to over 3,000 group cases in Moscow, Leningrad and Ukraine, over 10,000 persons were convicted. In particular, in May 1931, in Leningrad alone over 1,000 persons were executed according to the so-called "Guards Case" (Russian: Гвардейское дело).

The late 1930s saw purges of the Red Army leadership which occurred concurrently with Stalin's Great Purge of Soviet society. In 1936 and 1937, at the orders of Stalin, thousands of Red Army senior officers were dismissed from their commands. The purges had the objective of cleansing the Red Army of the "politically unreliable elements," mainly among higher-ranking officers. This inevitably provided a convenient pretext for the settling of personal vendettas or to eliminate competition by officers seeking the same command. Many army, corps, and divisional commanders were sacked: most were imprisoned or sent to labor camps; others were executed. Among the victims was the Red Army's primary military theorist, Marshal Mikhail Tukhachevsky, who was perceived by Stalin as a potential political rival. Officers who remained soon found all of their decisions being closely examined by political officers, even in mundane matters such as record-keeping and field training exercises. An atmosphere of fear and unwillingness to take the initiative soon pervaded the Red Army; suicide rates among junior officers rose to record levels. The purges significantly impaired the combat capabilities of the Red Army. Hoyt concludes "the Soviet defense system was damaged to the point of incompetence" and stresses "the fear in which high officers lived." Clark says, "Stalin not only cut the heart out of the army, he also gave it brain damage." Lewin identifies three serious results: the loss of experienced and well-trained senior officers; the distrust it caused among potential allies especially France; and the encouragement it gave Germany.

Recently declassified data indicated that in 1937, at the height of the Purges, the Red Army had 114,300 officers, of whom 11,034 were dismissed. In 1938, the Red Army had 179,000 officers, 56% more than in 1937, of whom a further 6,742 were dismissed. In the highest echelons of the Red Army the Purges removed 3 of 5 marshals, 13 of 15 army generals, 8 of 9 admirals, 50 of 57 army corps generals, 154 out of 186 division generals, all 16 army commissars, and 25 of 28 army corps commissars.

The result was that the Red Army officer corps in 1941 had many inexperienced senior officers. While 60% of regimental commanders had two years or more of command experience in June 1941, and almost 80% of rifle division commanders, only 20% of corps commanders, and 5% or fewer army and military district commanders, had the same level of experience.

The significant growth of the Red Army during the high point of the purges may have worsened matters. In 1937, the Red Army numbered around 1.3 million, increasing to almost three times that number by June 1941. The rapid growth of the army necessitated in turn the rapid promotion of officers regardless of experience or training. Junior officers were appointed to fill the ranks of the senior leadership, many of whom lacked broad experience. This action in turn resulted in many openings at the lower level of the officer corps, which were filled by new graduates from the service academies. In 1937, the entire junior class of one academy was graduated a year early to fill vacancies in the Red Army. Hamstrung by inexperience and fear of reprisals, many of these new officers failed to impress the large numbers of incoming draftees to the ranks; complaints of insubordination rose to the top of offenses punished in 1941, and may have exacerbated instances of Red Army soldiers deserting their units during the initial phases of the German offensive of that year.

By 1940, Stalin began to relent, restoring approximately one-third of previously dismissed officers to duty. However, the effect of the purges would soon manifest itself in the Winter War of 1940, where Red Army forces generally performed poorly against the much smaller Finnish Army, and later during the German invasion of 1941, in which the Germans were able to rout the Soviet defenders partially due to inexperience amongst the Soviet officers.

=== Weapons and equipment ===
The Soviet Union expanded its own arms industry as part of Stalin's industrialisation program in the 1920s and 1930s.

== See also ==
- Uniforms and insignia of the Red Army (1917–1922)
- German atrocities committed against Soviet prisoners of war
- Soviet war crimes
- Soviet repressions of Polish citizens (1939–1946)
- M School
- Russian Signal Troops
- Units
  - Military units and formations of the Soviet Union by size
  - Military units and formations of the Soviet Union in World War II
  - Military districts of the Soviet Union
  - Soviet fronts
  - Field armies of the Soviet Union
  - Army corps of the Soviet Union
