= Ernst Wollweber =

German politician

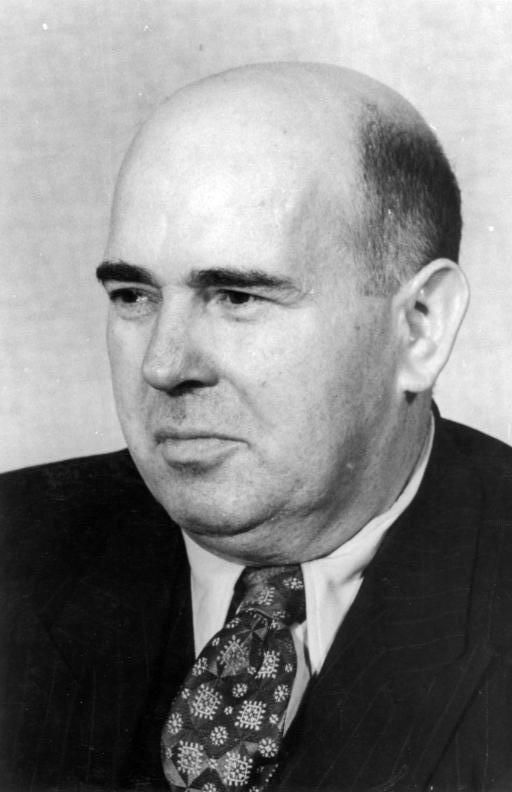
- Wollweber in 1950

Minister for State Security (Note: In the aftermath of the uprising of 1953, the Ministry for State Security was punished by being demoted to a State Secretariat under the Ministry of the Interior before being reinstated as a Ministry in November 1955.)
- In office 18 July 1953 – 1 November 1957
- Minister-President: Otto Grotewohl
- First Deputy: Erich Mielke
- Preceded by: Wilhelm Zaisser
- Succeeded by: Erich Mielke

Member of the Reichstag for Reichswahlvorschlag
- In office 6 December 1932 – 8 March 1933
- Preceded by: Multi-member district
- Succeeded by: Constituency abolished

Personal details
- Born: Ernst Friedrich Wollweber; 29 October 1898 Hann. Münden, Province of Hanover, Kingdom of Prussia, German Empire (now Lower Saxony, Germany)
- Died: 3 May 1967 (aged 68) East Berlin, East Germany
- Party: Socialist Unity Party (1946–1958)
- Other political affiliations: Communist Party of Germany (1919–1946)
- Spouse: Ragnhild Wiik
- Occupation: Politician; Party Functionary; Naval Officer
- Central institution membership: 1954–1958: Full member, Central Committee; 1921–1925: Member, KPD Central Commission; Other offices held: 1953: State Secretary, State Secretariat for Shipping; 1950–1953: State Secretary, Ministry of Transport; 1929–1930: Political Leader, Silesia KPD; 1921–1923: Political Leader, Hesse-Waldeck KPD

Ernst Friedrich Wollweber (29 October 1898 – 3 May 1967) was a German politician who was State Secretary of State Security from 1953 to 1955 and Minister of State Security of East Germany from 1955 to 1957.

== Biography ==
Wollweber was born in Hannoversch Münden, Hanover on 29 October 1898. In 1916, during the First World War, he was drafted into the Imperial German Navy, serving in the submarine division.

In November 1918, Wollweber participated in the Wilhelmshaven mutiny, a high-profile sailor rebellion in Kiel, and, following the end of the German Revolution, joined the Communist Party of Germany in 1919.

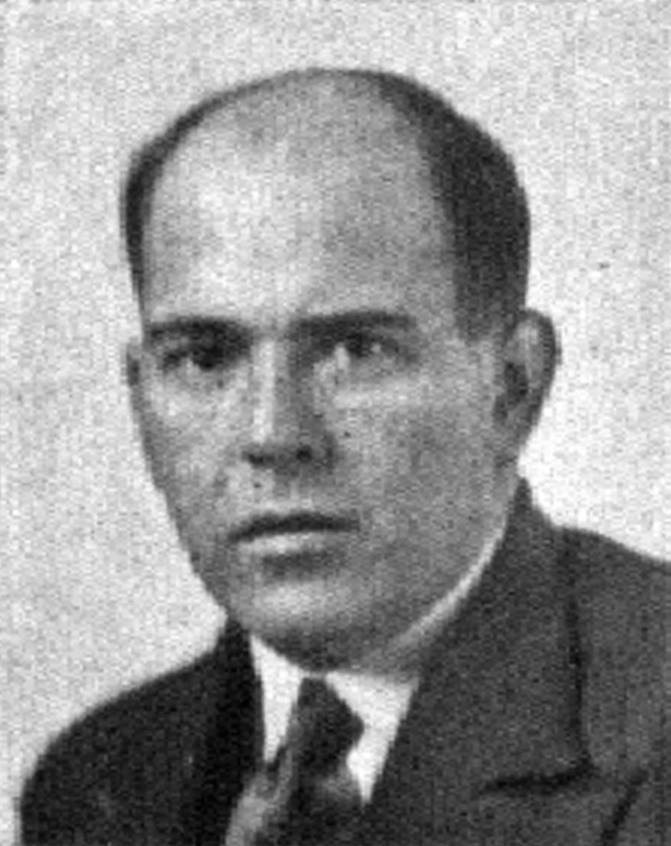
Wollweber's official Reichstag portrait, 1933

Wollweber rose quickly through the party ranks and by 1921 had become a member of the KPD’s Central Committee and Political Secretary of Hesse-Waldeck. Two years later, Wollweber became a leader of the military wings of the KPD in Hesse-Waldeck, Thuringia, and Silesia. Wollweber’s activities led to his arrest in 1924, after which time he was charged with high treason. Wollweber was released in 1926, and in 1928 he was elected a representative of the Prussian Federal State Parliament, a position he held until 1932. In 1929, he was elected to the Federal State Parliament of Lower Silesia and from 1932 to 1933 was a representative of the Reichstag. He served as political leader of the KPD's Silesia district from 1929 to 1930. In 1931 was he elected to the leadership of the International Union of Seamen and Harbour Workers (ISH).

When the KPD was outlawed in Germany after the Reichstag fire of February 1933, Wollweber was forced to flee to Copenhagen and later to Leningrad. In 1936, he and his Norwegian wife, Ragnhild Wiik, moved to Oslo, where they lived in an apartment in the newly-built suburb of Sinsenterrassen. From then to 1940, Wollweber organized the "Organisation Against Fascism and in Support of the USSR", better known as the Wollweber League. The League conducted 21 known acts of sabotage against the ships of fascist nations sailing from Scandinavian and other northern European ports. Wollweber's agents stole dynamite from iron ore mines in Kiruna and Luleå in northern Sweden, smuggled it to Narvik in northern Norway, and thence by sea to Oslo. Their attacks included the sinkings of the Italian ship Boccaccio in November 1937, and the German ship Claus Böge in March 1938. Both ships were carrying arms and ammunition to equip the Nationalist forces in the Spanish Civil War.

In 1937, Wollweber became a weapons supplier to the Republican forces in the Spanish Civil War. When Germany invaded Norway in April 1940, Wollweber fled to Sweden, where he was arrested, and very nearly deported to certain death in Germany. Eventually he was sentenced to three years' imprisonment. Because he had received Soviet citizenship while in custody, the Swedish Government in 1944 finally gave in to Soviet pressure and allowed Wollweber to leave for the USSR.

After World War II, Wollweber returned to Germany and joined the Socialist Unity Party of Germany in 1946. A year later, he became leader of the central management for shipping and in 1950, Undersecretary of State for the Ministry of Traffic in East Germany. Around this time, it was rumored in the West that he had established a new Wollweber Organization for the USSR, which would be teaching Communist agents in nations in Eastern Europe and along the North Sea the art of sabotage. However, these rumours have not been substantiated. While in this position, he was spied on by Walter Gramsch, who foiled several of Wollweber's attempts to smuggle products past the Western embargo into East Germany.

In June 1953, Wollweber was made Undersecretary of State for the Shipping Office, but a month later he became State Secretary of State Security (the Stasi) after Wilhelm Zaisser was removed from the post as Minister of State Security and the Stasi was downgraded to a State Secretariat. In November 1955, Wollweber was made Minister of State Security, after the Stasi had been restored to a ministry. Wollweber tried to improve the Stasi's domestic powers in the search of what he saw as Western intelligence infiltration of the GDR but this brought him into conflict with the mainstream in the SED party leadership, in particularly with its head Walter Ulbricht and Erich Honecker.

In 1954, Wollweber became a delegate to the Volkskammer or People's Parliament and a member of the SED’s Central Committee. After 1956, his influence began to wane when he clashed with Walter Ulbricht and Erich Honecker on issues ranging from East Germany’s policies towards Poland to an estimate of the number of anti-Communist groups within GDR. Besides, a new opposition group led by Politburo member Karl Schirdewan had formed within the SED Politburo to oppose Ulbricht's policies and Wollweber had unwisely taken Schirdewan's side.

In 1957, Wollweber was forced to resign as head of the Stasi and was succeeded by his deputy, Erich Mielke. In 1958, Wollweber was accused of anti-SED activity and was removed from the Central Committee. Shortly thereafter, Wollweber resigned from the Volkskammer and lived in obscurity in East Berlin eking out a living as a translator until his death in 1967. After his death Wollweber was cremated and honoured with burial in the Pergolenweg Ehrengrab section of Berlin's Friedrichsfelde Cemetery.
