= Admiral Berens =

Admiral Berens may refer to:

- Mikhail Berens (1879–1943), Imperial Russian Navy rear admiral
- Yevgeny Berens (1876–1928), Imperial Russian Navy vice admiral

== See also ==
- Bruce Beran (born 1935), U.S. Coast Guard vice admiral
