= Berens (surname) =

Berens is a German and Dutch surname.

== Geographical distribution ==
As of 2014, 42.0% of all known bearers of the surname Berens were residents of the United States (frequency 1:81,381), 41.8% of Germany (1:18,151), 6.7% of the Netherlands (1:23,777), 2.1% of Canada (1:162,823) and 1.2% of England (1:427,690).

In Germany, the frequency of the surname was higher than the national average (1:18,151) in the following states:

1. Rhineland-Palatinate (1:3,859)
2. Saarland (1:8,989)
3. North Rhine-Westphalia (1:9,775)
4. Lower Saxony (1:10,756)
5. Bremen (1:17,339)

In the Netherlands, the frequency of the surname was higher than the national average (1:23,777) in the following provinces:

1. Drenthe (1:3,609)
2. North Brabant (1:12,627)
3. Gelderland (1:16,375)

In the United States, the frequency of the surname was higher than the national average (1:81,381) in the following states:

1. South Dakota (1:5,591)
2. Minnesota (1:16,742)
3. Michigan (1:18,839)
4. Kansas (1:19,642)
5. Wisconsin (1:21,487)
6. Nebraska (1:24,255)
7. Colorado (1:24,930)
8. Wyoming (1:28,652)
9. Iowa (1:33,323)
10. Montana (1:45,306)
11. Illinois (1:48,348)
12. Ohio (1:53,388)
13. North Dakota (1:57,528)
14. Arizona (1:61,234)
15. Alaska (1:62,578)
16. Washington (1:75,796)

== People ==
- Charlie Berens (born 1987), American comedian
- Chris Berens (born 1976), Dutch painter
- Fritz Berens, conductor of the Sacramento Symphony
- Harold Berens (1903–1995), British comedian and character actor
- Henry Hulse Berens (1804–1883), governor of the Hudson's Bay Company
  - Fort Berens, a short-lived fur trade post in the Fraser Canyon region of British Columbia, Canada
- Hermann Berens (1826–1880), German composer
- Lewis Henry Berens (1855–1913), businessman and political theorist in South Australia
- Mikhail Berens (1879–1943), admiral in the Imperial Russian Navy and the White Navy during the Russian Civil War, brother of Yevgeny
- Ricky Berens (born 1988), swimmer and Olympic gold medalist for the United States
- Yevgeny Berens (1876–1928), Commander-in-Chief of Soviet Naval Forces 1919–1920, brother of Mikhail Berens

== See also ==
- Behrens (disambiguation)
