= Behrens =

Behrens is a surname of Germanic origin. Notable people with the surname include:

== Politics/social ==
- Alice Behrens (1885–1952), British Girl Guide
- Betty Behrens (1904–1989), British historian
- Daniela Behrens (born 1968), German politician
- Jens Behrens (born 1978), German politician
- Julia Behrens (born 1990), German politician
- Katja Behrens (1942–2021), German writer and translator
- Heidi Behrens-Benedict (born 1948), American politician
- Manfred Behrens (born 1956), German politician
- Rob Behrens (born 1952), UK Parliamentary and Health Service Ombudsman

== Design and arts ==
- Peter Behrens (1868–1940), German architect
- Paul Behrens (clockmaker) (1893–1984), German clock maker
- Hanne Behrens (born 1950), Danish goldsmith
- Howard Behrens (1933–2014), American artist

== Entertainment ==
- Jack Behrens (1935–2024), Canadian composer
- Heinz Behrens (1932–2022), German actor
- Hildegard Behrens (1937–2009), German opera singer
- Peter Behrens (musician) (1947–2016), German musician, actor and clown
- Sam Behrens (born 1950), American actor
- Howie Behrens, member of rock band Pushmonkey

== Sports ==
- Kurt Behrens (1884–1928), German Olympic diver
- Isidor Behrens (1868–1951), Swedish sport club founder
- Klaus Behrens (1941–2022), German Olympic rower
- Kevin Behrens (born 1991), German footballer

== Science ==
- Heike Behrens (born 1962), German developmental psycholinguist
- Professor Paul Behrens, British author and environmental scientist, University of Oxford
- Timothy E.J. Behrens (active 2020), British neuroscientist
- Walter-Ulrich Behrens (1902–1962), German chemist and statistician

== Military ==
- W. W. Behrens Jr. (1922–1986), American naval officer and oceanographer

== Financial ==
- Leffmann Behrends (c. 1630–1714), Hanoverian financier
- Michael Behrens (banker) (1911–1989), British financier

== See also ==
- 1651 Behrens, an asteroid
- Behrens–Fisher problem
- Behrens (horse) (1994–2014), American thoroughbred racehorse
- Berens (disambiguation)
