= Beren (disambiguation) =

Beren may refer to:

- Steve Beren
- Beren (political party), a political party in Kyrgyzstan
- Beren Erchamion, fictional hero in J. R. R. Tolkien's Middle-earth legendarium
- Beren (given name), a Turkish female given name
