= Zof =

Zof or ZOF may refer to:

- Vyacheslav Ivanovich Zof (1889–1937), Soviet politician and military person
- Ángel Tulio Zof (1928–2014), Argentine footballer and coach
- ZOF, the IATA code for the Ocean Falls Water Aerodrome, Canada
