= Berens =

Berens may refer to:

In places:

- Berens Islands, Nunavut, Canada
- Berens River a river in Manitoba, Canada
  - Berens River Airport, an airport in Manitoba, Canada

In people:

- Berens (surname)

== See also ==
- Beren (disambiguation)
