= Beerens =

Beerens is a surname. Notable people with the surname include:

- Bas Beerens, Dutch entrepreneur
- Roy Beerens (born 1987), Dutch footballer

== See also ==
- Behrens
