= Aleksandr Nemits =

- Nemits in 1941
- Born: 26 July 1879; Cotiujeni, Bessarabia Governorate
- Died: 1 October 1967 (aged 88); Yalta, Ukrainian SSR
- Military career
- Allegiance: Russian Empire; Ukraine; Soviet Union
- Branch: Imperial Russian Navy; Ukrainian Navy; Soviet Navy
- Service years: 1899–1947
- Rank: Vice Admiral
- Commands: Black Sea Fleet; Soviet Navy
- Conflicts: World War I Russian Civil War

Aleksandr Vasilivich Nemits, (Russian: Александр Васильевич Нёмитц; 26 July 1879 – 1 October 1967) was a naval officer of Russian Empire, Ukrainian State and Soviet Union. He was commander of the Soviet Navy between February 1920 and November 1921.

Nemits was born in Moldavia, the son of a military judge. He graduated from the Naval Cadet Corps in 1899 and joined the Black Sea Fleet, later serving as assistant to the Naval attaché to Turkey and as a gunnery officer. Following the mutinies of 1905 he served as a defence lawyer for the mutineers and managed to spare them from the death penalty.

From 1907 he served on the Navy general staff and commanded the gunboat Donets. Subsequently he commanded a destroyer division and held various staff posts. In 1917 he married Anastasia, the sister of the artist Mikhail Vrubel. In 1917 he was promoted to rear admiral and commanded the Black Sea Fleet, replacing Vice-Admiral A. V. Kolchak. In this role on 23 November 1917 he asked the Ukrainian People's Republic to take the fleet under his jurisdiction. On 30 September 1918 the Ukrainian State appointed Nemits as their Minister of Marine. Later in 1918 he joined the Red Navy and fought in the civil war where he was wounded.

In February 1920 he replaced Yevgeniy Berens as commander of the Soviet Navy. From 1924 he was in charge of all Soviet naval and air force academies. He retired in 1947 and lived in Sevastopol.

Military offices
Preceded by Yevgeniy Berens	Commander of Naval Forces of the Republic ("KoMorSi") of U.S.S.R; January 1920 - December 1921	Succeeded by Eduard Pantserzhanskiy as Chief of Naval Forces of U.S.S.R
