= Lilia Usik =

German politician (born 1989)

Member of the Abgeordnetenhaus of Berlin
- Incumbent
- Assumed office 4 May 2023
- Preceded by: Andreas Geisel
- Constituency: Lichtenberg 6

Personal details
- Born: 14 February 1989 (age 37)
- Party: Christian Democratic Union (since 2016)

Lilia Usik (Ukrainian: Лілія Усік; born 14 February 1989) is a Soviet-born German politician serving as a member of the Abgeordnetenhaus of Berlin since 2023. From 2021 to 2023, she was a borough councillor of Lichtenberg.
