= Vladimir Mitrofanovich Orlov =

Soviet admiral (1895–1938)

- Born: July 15, 1895; Kherson, Ukraine
- Died: July 28, 1938 (aged 43) ?, Soviet Union
- Allegiance: Russian Empire (to 1918); Russian SFSR (1918–22); Soviet Union (from 1922)
- Branch: Imperial Russian Navy; Soviet Navy (Workers' and Peasants' Red Fleet)
- Service years: 1916–1937
- Rank: Flag officer of the fleet, 1st grade (equivalent to fleet admiral
- Commands: Black Sea Fleet, Soviet Navy
- Conflicts: World War I Russian Civil War

Vladimir Mitrofanovich Orlov (Russian: Владимир Митрофанович Орлов; July 15, 1895 – July 28, 1938) was a Russian military leader and Commander-in-Chief of the Soviet Naval Forces from July 1931 to July 1937.

== Life ==
Orlov was born in Kherson and initially studied in the Legal faculty of St Petersburg University (although he did not complete his studies). He joined the Baltic Fleet in 1916 and served as a navigating officer on the cruiser Bogatyr. In 1918 he joined the Russian Communist Party (b) and In 1919-20 he was a political officer of the Baltic Fleet and fought against the forces of the white General Nikolai Yudenich in the defence of Petrograd.

In the 1920s he was commissar for Water Transport and in 1923 he became political commissar for all naval academies. Between 1926 and 1930 he commanded the Black Sea Fleet. In 1931 he was appointed commander of the Soviet Navy and in 1937 he was appointed deputy minister of defence.

Orlov was arrested on 10 July 1937 during the Great Purge and was sentenced to death on 28 July 1938 and executed. He was posthumously rehabilitated in 1956.

Military offices
Preceded by Romuald Muklevich	Chief of Naval Forces of U.S.S.R; June 11, 1931- August 15, 1937	Succeeded by Mikhail Viktorov
