= Mikhail Viktorov =

Commander in Chief of the Soviet Navy (1893–1938)

- Born: December 24, 1893; Yaroslavl, Russian Empire
- Died: August 1, 1938 (aged 44); Soviet Union
- Military career
- Allegiance: Soviet Union
- Branch: Imperial Russian Navy; Soviet Navy
- Service years: 1913–1937
- Rank: Fleet's Flag-officer of 1st Rank
- Commands: Soviet Navy; Soviet Hydrographic Office (1925–1926)
- Conflicts: World War I Russian Civil War
- Awards: Order of Saint Stanislaus; Order of Lenin; Order of the Red Banner; Order of the Red Star

Mikhail Vladimirovich Viktorov (Russian: Михаил Владимирович Викторов; December 24, 1893 – August 1, 1938) was a Russian military leader and Commander-in-Chief of the Soviet Naval Forces from August 1937 to January 1938.

== Career ==
Born at Yaroslavl, Viktorov was the son of an officer and graduated from the Naval Academy with the gold medal as top cadet in 1913. During World War I he served with the Baltic Fleet and was navigating officer of the battleship Tsesarevich and fought in the Battle of Moon Sound.

In the Civil War he joined the Bolsheviks and commanded the cruiser Oleg and subsequently the battleships Andrei Pervozvanny and Gangut. In 1921 he contributed to the suppression of the Kronstadt rebellion.

Between December 1924 and April 1926 he was named Chief of the Central Hydrographic Department of the USSR. From 1925 he commanded the Soviet Baltic Fleet and in 1932 was the founding commander of the Soviet Pacific Fleet.

He became commander of the Soviet navy following the arrest of his predecessor. Viktorov was himself arrested at the end of 1937 and was shot in 1938. He was posthumously rehabilitated in 1956.

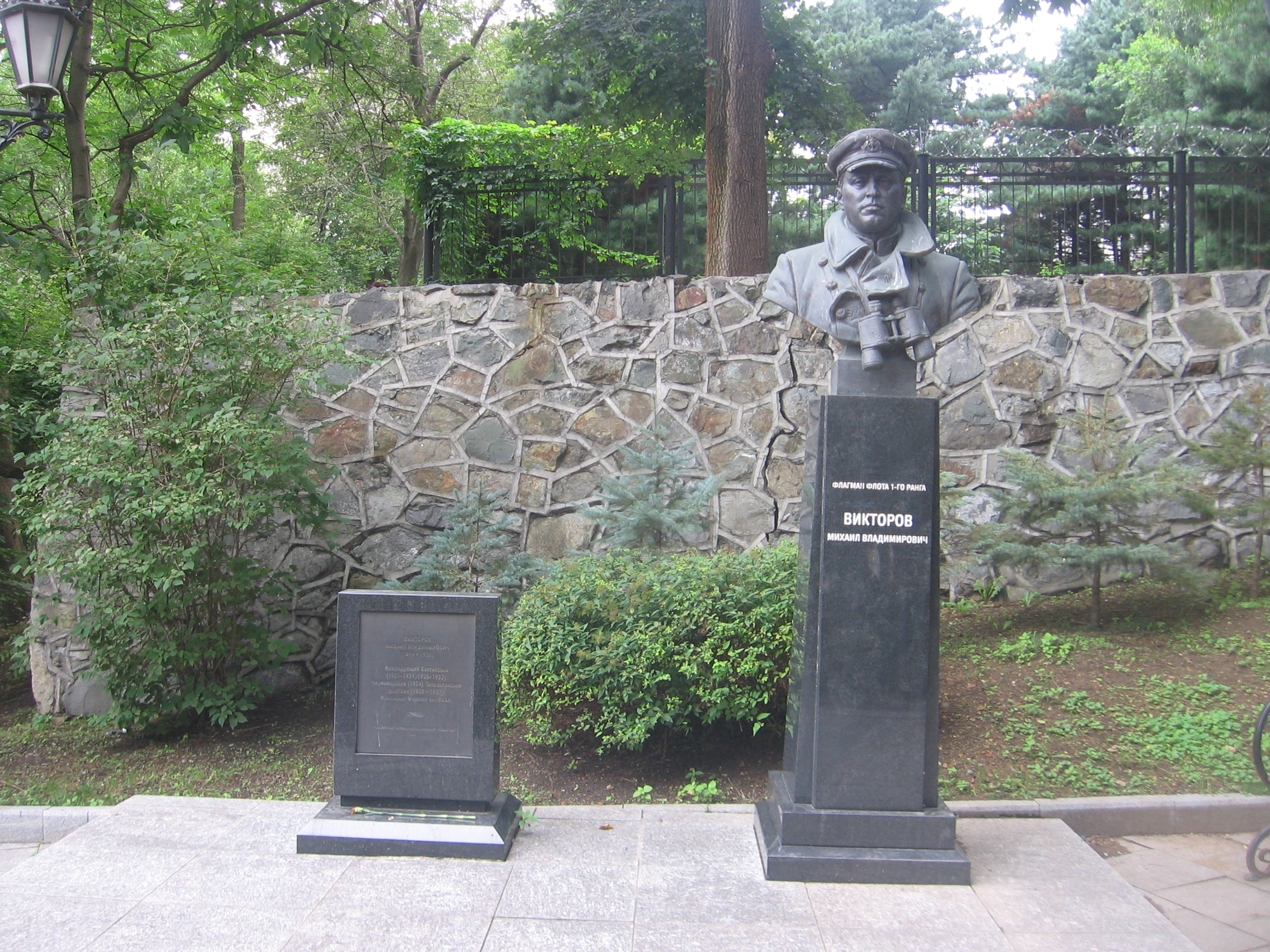
Statue of Mikhail Viktorov in Vladivostok, Russia.

== See also ==
- Russian Hydrographic Service

Military offices
| Preceded by Vladimir Mitrofanovich Orlov | Chief of Naval Forces of U.S.S.R; August 1937 - December 1937 | Succeeded by Pyotr Alexandrovich Smirnov (People's Commissar of the Soviet Navy, Commander-in-Chief of the Naval Forces) |
