= Eduard Pantserzhanskiy =

Russian naval commander (1887–1937)

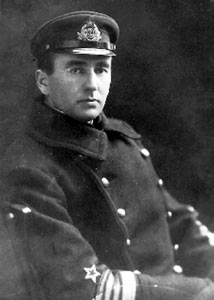
- Born: 12 October 1887; Liepāja, Courland Governorate, Russian Empire
- Died: 26 September 1937 (aged 49); Kommunarka shooting ground, Moscow Oblast, Soviet Union
- Military career
- Allegiance: Russian Empire; Soviet Union
- Branch: Imperial Russian Navy, Soviet Navy
- Service years: 1910–1937
- Rank: Vice Admiral
- Commands: Soviet Navy
- Conflicts: World War I Russian Civil War

Eduard Samuilovich Pantserzhanskiy (Russian: Эдуа́рд Самуи́лович Панцержа́нский; 12 October [O.S. 30 September] 1887 – 26 September 1937) was a Russian military leader, Commander-in-Chief of the Soviet Naval Forces from December 1921 to December 1924.

== Biography ==
Pantserzhanskiy was born in Liepāja, Latvia the son of a Polish nobleman and studied at the Riga Technical University. He graduated from the Naval Academy in 1910 and joined the Baltic Fleet. Pantserzhanskiy was an officer on the destroyer Grom and fought in the Battle of Moon Sound. During the Civil war he fought on riverine flotillas on Lake Onega and the Volga-Caspian front.

Between 1921 and 1924 Pantserzhanskiy was a commander of the Soviet Navy. From 1924 he joined the general staff holding various commands.

Pantserzhanskiy was denounced in 1937 by Boris Feldman and arrested in June. He was tried, sentenced to death and executed by a firing squad on 26 September 1937 at the Kommunarka shooting ground. Pantserzhanskiy was posthumously rehabilitated in 1956.

== Notes ==
Military offices
Preceded by Aleksandr Nemits as Commanders of Naval Forces of the Republic ("KoMorSi")	Chief of Naval Forces of U.S.S.R; December 1921 – 9 December 1924	Succeeded by Vyacheslav Ivanovich Zof
