= Romuald Muklevich =

Soviet admiral (1890–1938)

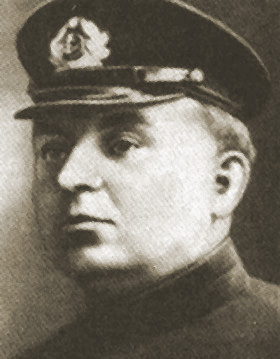
- Born: 25 November 1890; Supraśl, Grodno Governorate, Russian Empire
- Died: 9 February 1938 (aged 47) Moscow, Soviet Union
- Allegiance: Soviet Union
- Branch: Imperial Russian Navy; Soviet Navy
- Service years: 1912–1934
- Rank: Fleet's Flag-officer of 1st Rank
- Commands: Soviet Navy
- Conflicts: World War I Russian Civil War

Romuald Adamovich Muklevich (Russian: Ромуальд Адамович Муклевич, Polish: Romuald Muklewicz, 25 November 1890 – 9 February 1938) was a Soviet military figure and Commander-in-Chief of the Soviet Naval Forces from August 1926 to July 1931.

== Early life ==
Muklevich was born in Supraśl in the Grodno Governorate of the Russian Empire (currently in Białystok County, Poland). He was a son of a textile worker of Polish ethnicity. He joined the Bolshevik faction of the Russian Social Democratic Labour Party in 1906 and became chairman of several local committees.

== Career ==
Muklevich was drafted into Baltic Fleet as a sailor in 1912, and completed a marine engineering course (Kronstadt) in 1915 and was promoted to petty officer.

In 1917 he participated in the February and October revolutions including the storming of the Winter Palace.

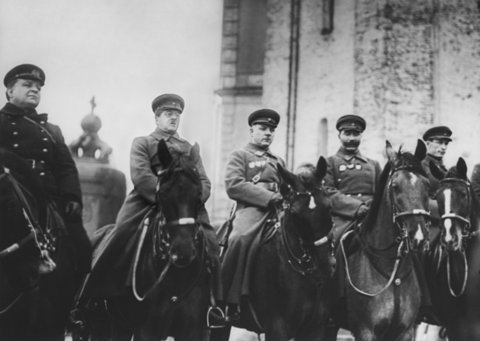
Muklevich, Józef Unszlicht, Kliment Voroshilov and Semyon Budyonny at the 1929 May Day parade

In 1918–1922 he was political commissar on the Western Front. From 1922 he was commissar of the military academy of the Red Army and in 1925 he was deputy commander of the Soviet Air Force. He was commander of the Soviet Navy between 1926 and 1931. From 1934 he was commissar for the shipbuilding industry and in 1936 he was made deputy People's Commissar (minister) for the defence industries.

During the Great Purge, he was arrested on 28 May 1937, and accused of "organising a Polish fascist conspiracy in the Red Army", to which he confessed under torture. He was sentenced to death on 8 February 1938 and shot the following day.

Romuald Muklevich was posthumously rehabilitated in 1957.

== Personality ==
Alexander Barmine wrote that "Fat and sturdy and round-faced, this Old Bolshevik had all the quiet confidence and also the appearance of a born leader ... He was the kind of man whom Stalin does not willingly let live, even behind bars."

== Notes ==
Military offices
Preceded by Vyacheslav Ivanovich Zof	Chief of Naval Forces of U.S.S.R; 23 August 1926 – 11 June 1931	Succeeded by Vladimir Mitrofanovich Orlov
