= Julia Behrens =

German politician (born 1990)

- Behrens in 2026

Member of the Berlin House of Representatives
- Assuming office 29 October 2026
- Succeeding: Lilia Usik
- Constituency: Lichtenberg 6

Personal details
- Born: 1990 (age 35–36)
- Party: Die Linke

Julia Behrens (born 1990) is a German politician who was elected member of the Berlin House of Representatives in 2026. She has been a research analyst at the German Advisory Council on Global Change since 2025.
