= Lichtenberg 6 =

State electoral district of Germany

- Electoral district for the Berlin House of Representatives
- Lichtenberg 6 in 2026
- District: Lichtenberg
- Electorate: 32,731 (2026)

Current electoral district
- Party: The Left
- Member: Julia Behrens

Lichtenberg 6 is an electoral constituency (German: Wahlkreis) represented in the House of Representatives of Berlin. It elects one member via first-past-the-post voting.

== Geography ==
The constituency comprises the entirety of the district of Karlshorst, the southern part of Rummelsburg, and part of Friedrichsfelde. It is entirely within the borough of Lichtenberg.

There were 32,731 eligible voters in 2026.

== Members ==
Election	Member	Party	%
2006	Harald Wolf	The Left	39.7
2011	Harald Wolf	The Left	32.5
2016	Harald Wolf	The Left	28.7
2021	Andreas Geisel	SPD	27.1
2023	Lilia Usik	CDU	22.4
2026	Julia Behrens	Left	31.3

== Election results ==
=== 2026 election ===
State election (2026): Lichtenberg 6
Notes:	Blue background denotes the winner of the electorate vote. Pink background denotes a candidate elected from their party list. Yellow background denotes an electorate win by a list member, or other incumbent. A ✓ or ✗ denotes status of any incumbent, win or lose respectively.						
Party	Candidate	Votes	%	±%	Party votes	%	±%
Left	Julia Behrens	8,081	31.3	▲9.6	7,309	28.2	▲9.8
CDU	✗ Lilia Usik	4,794	18.6	▼3.8	4,032	15.5	▼7.6
AfD	Dietmar Drewes	4,018	15.6	▲5.6	4,199	16.2	▲6.3
Greens	Daniela Ehlers	2,975	11.5	▼4.7	3,643	14.0	▼2.6
SPD	René Pohle	2,611	10.1	▼9.3	2,694	10.4	▼6.8
BSW	Norman Wolf	1,487	5.8		1,681	6.5	
APT	Katja Michel	636	2.5	▼1.7	559	2.2	▼0.7
Volt	Achim Jedelsky	579	2.2		731	2.8	▲1.8
FDP	Joachim Schultheiß	495	1.9	▼1.5	594	2.3	▼1.7
PARTEI					230	0.9	▼0.9
Independent	Thomas Gerken	160	0.6				
PdF					122	0.5	
DKP					49	0.2	▼0.1
ÖDP					38	0.1	Steady
HEIMAT					28	0.1	Steady
du.					26	0.1	▼0.1
SGP					8	0.0	▼0.1
Informal votes		381			274		
Total valid votes		25,836			25,943		
Turnout		26,217	80.1	▲9.9			
Left gain from CDU	Majority	3,287	12.9				

=== 2023 repeat election ===
Changes denoted below for the 2023 election are compared to the 2016 election, as the 2021 election was declared invalid.

State election (2023): Lichtenberg 6
Notes:	Blue background denotes the winner of the electorate vote. Pink background denotes a candidate elected from their party list. Yellow background denotes an electorate win by a list member, or other incumbent. A ✓ or ✗ denotes status of any incumbent, win or lose respectively.						
Party	Candidate	Votes	%	±%	Party votes	%	±%
CDU	Lilia Usik	4,807	22.4	▲8.5	4,996	23.2	▲10.2
Left	Norman Wolf	4,669	21.7	▼7.0	3,972	18.4	▼7.8
SPD	Andreas Geisel	4,174	19.4	▼7.3	3,707	17.2	▼4.9
Greens	Daniela Ehlers	3,496	16.3	▲7.5	3,585	16.6	▲7.0
AfD	Dietmar Drewes	2,130	9.9	▼5.7	2,141	9.9	▼5.7
APT	Katja Michel	893	4.2		620	2.9	▲0.9
FDP	Joachim Schultheiß	742	3.5	▲0.3	853	4.0	▲0.3
PARTEI					381	1.8	▼0.4
Volt					225	1.0	
FW	Götz Frommer	394	1.8		140	0.6	
dieBasis	Sören Kiss	198	0.9		133	0.6	
Gray Panthers					105	0.5	▼0.5
The Grays					88	0.4	
Pirates					82	0.4	▼1.3
DKP					73	0.3	▼0.1
Verjüngungsforschung					70	0.3	▼0.5
Klimaliste					69	0.3	
Team Todenhöfer					62	0.3	
Mieterpartei					49	0.2	
Humanists					37	0.2	
Bildet Berlin!					33	0.2	
du.					33	0.2	
ÖDP					33	0.2	
SGP					18	0.1	▼0.1
NPD					16	0.1	▼0.5
Bergpartei, die ÜberPartei					15	0.1	
The Pinks/Alliance 21					15	0.1	
BüSo					10	0.0	▼0.1
LKR					6	0.0	▼0.5
Informal votes		186			123		
Total valid votes		21,503			21,567		
Turnout		21,705	70.2	▼0.9			
CDU gain from Left	Majority	138	0.7				

== See also ==
- Politics of Berlin
- House of Representatives of Berlin
