= Vyacheslav Zof =

Soviet military leader and statesman

Vyacheslav Ivanovich Zof
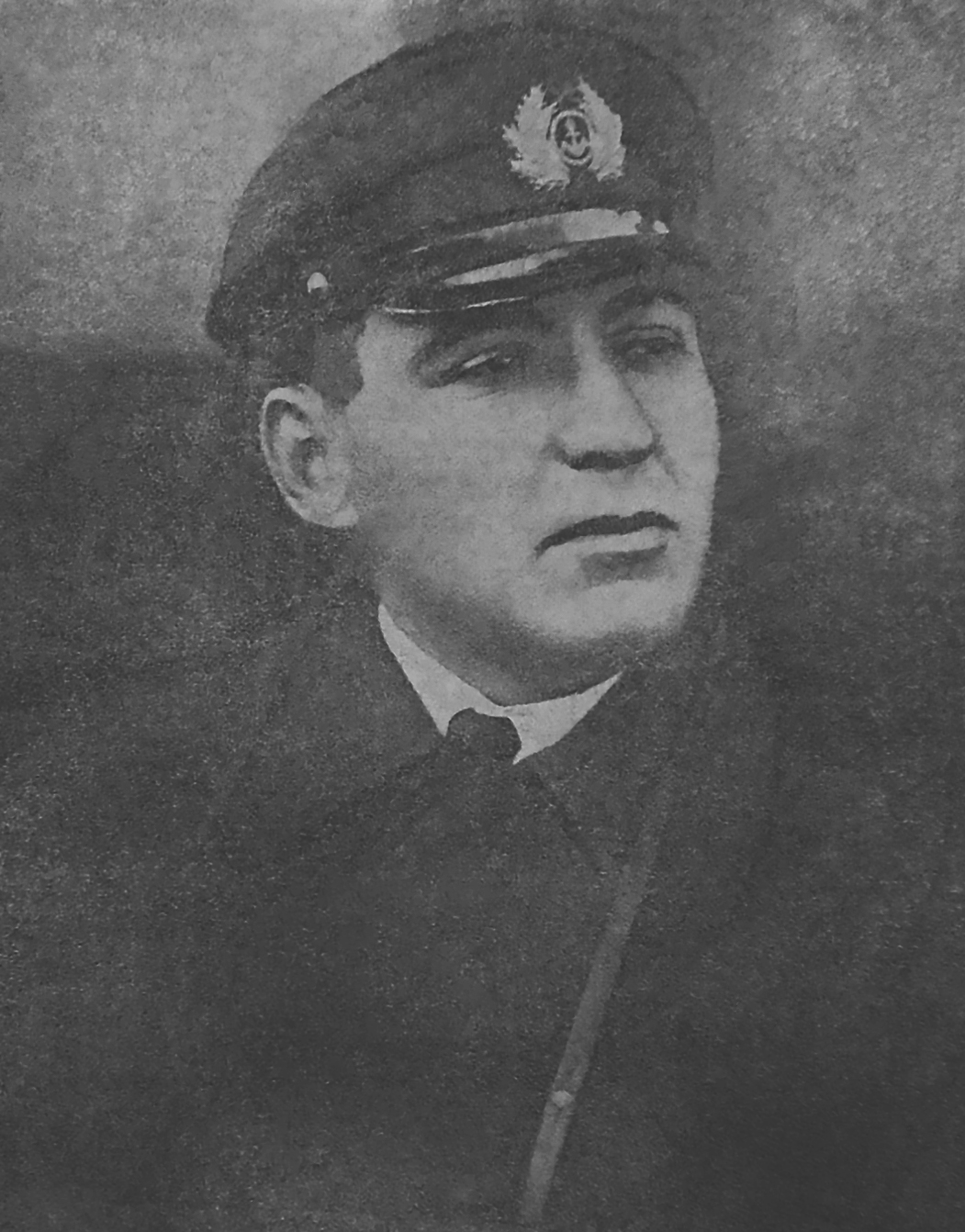
- Born: January 6, 1890; Dubno, Volhynian Governorate, Russian Empire
- Died: June 2, 1937 (aged 47) Moscow, Russian Soviet Federative Socialist Republic, Soviet Union
- Allegiance: Soviet Union
- Branch: Red Army; Soviet Navy
- Service years: 1919-1929
- Rank: Commissar 1st Rank
- Commands: Soviet Navy
- Conflicts: Russian Civil War
- Awards: Order of the Red Banner
- Other work: merchant navy director, factory manager

Vyacheslav Ivanovich Zof (Russian: Вячеслав Иванович Зоф; 6 January 1890 – 20 June 1937) was a Soviet military figure and statesman of Czech descent.

== Biography ==
Zof joined the revolutionary movement in 1910. Three years later he became a member of the Russian Social Democratic Labour Party (RSDLP). During World War I, Zof worked as a fitter at an arms factory in Sestroretsk, where he was in charge of the Bolshevist underground. After the February Revolution in 1917, Zof led the Bolsheviks' organization in Sestroretsk and was a deputy of the Petrograd Soviet.

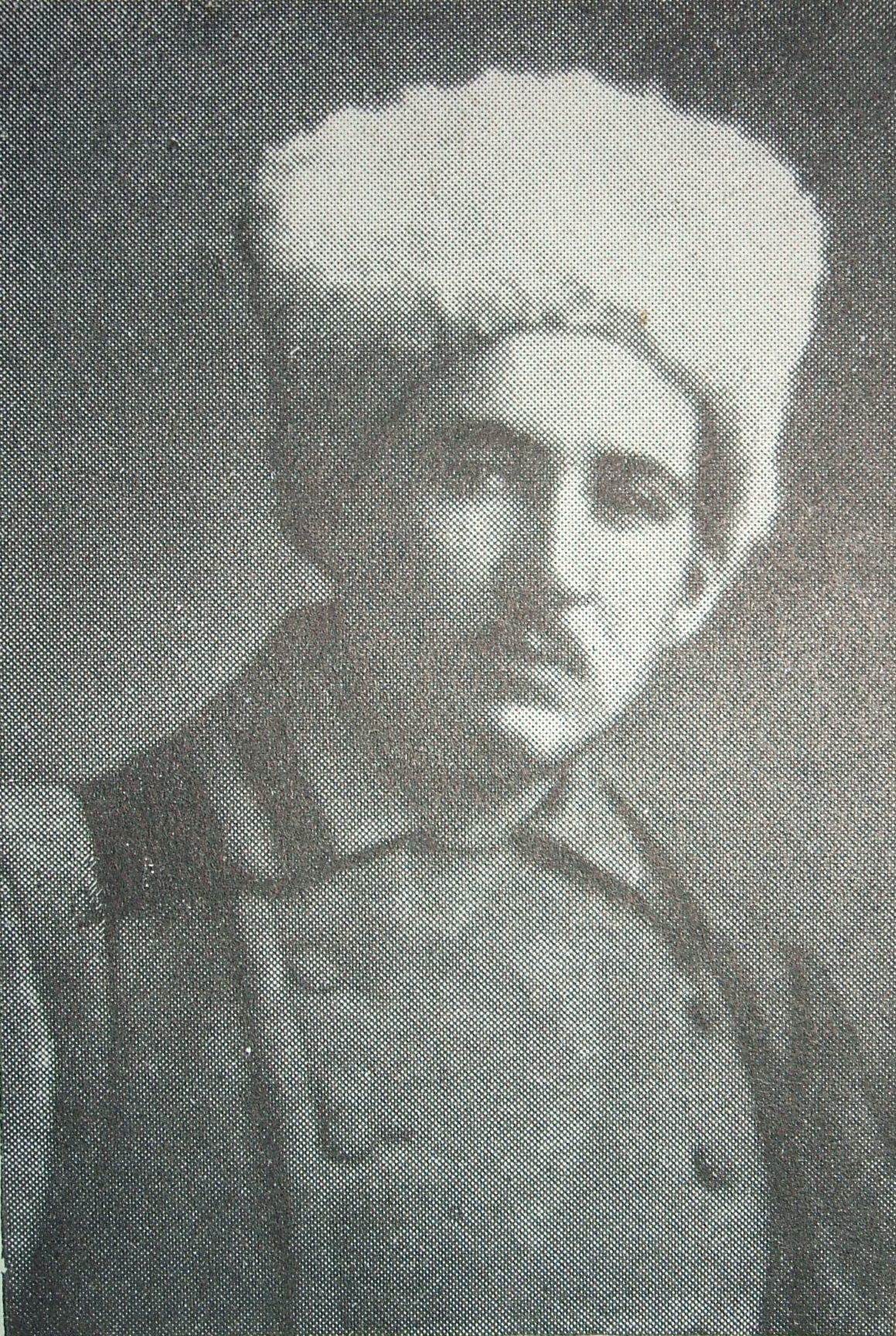
Vyacheslav Zof in 1917

In July 1917, he prepared fake identity papers for Vladimir Lenin and organized his move from Petrograd to Razliv at the request of the RSDLP Central Committee. Zof would then establish contact between Lenin and the Central Committee.

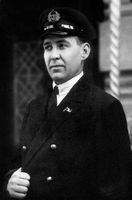
Vyacheslav Zof as navy commander

In 1918–1919, he was appointed brigade and division commissar and supplies manager for the 3rd Army of the Eastern Front. In 1919–1920, Zof was a member of the Revolutionary Military Council of the Baltic Fleet and a member of the Petrograd defense committee. In 1921–1924, he held a post of a commissar at the office of the commander-in-chief of the naval forces of the Republic. Between December 1924 and 1926, Zof was the commander of the naval forces and member of the Revolutionary Military Council of the USSR. In 1927–1929, he headed the Sovtorgflot (Soviet Commercial Fleet) office. In 1930–1931, Zof was a deputy People's Commissar of Railroad Transportation. In 1931, he was appointed first deputy People's Commissar of Water Transportation.

Later Zof fell into disgrace and was appointed director of the "Kompresor" factory in Moscow. In 1937, he was arrested and sentenced to death by the Military Collegium of the Supreme Court of the USSR on June 19 on account of being involved in an "anti-Soviet terrorist organisation". Zof was executed the next day.

He was posthumously rehabilitated in 1956.

== Awards ==
- Order of the Red Banner.

Military offices
Preceded by Eduard Pantserzhanskiy	Chief of Naval Forces of U.S.S.R; December 9, 1924 - August 23, 1926	Succeeded by Romuald Muklevich
