= Heike Behrens =

German linguist (born 1962)

Heike Behrens (born 18 January 1962 in Itzehoe, Germany) is a German linguist who is professor of cognitive linguistics and language acquisition at the University of Basel.

== Education, career and honours ==
Heike Behrens studied German and English at Kiel University, and received her doctorate in general linguistics at the University of Amsterdam in 1993. She worked at the Technical University of Braunschweig (1987-1989), at the Max Planck Institute for Psycholinguistics in Nijmegen (1989-1992), at UC Berkeley (1995-6), at the University of Cologne (1996-8), and at the Max Planck Institute for Evolutionary Anthropology in Leipzig (1998-2002). She was then appointed professor of German linguistics at the University of Groningen in 2002, before taking up her current position as professor of cognitive linguistics and language acquisition at the University of Basel in 2005.

From 2009 to 2015 Behrens was a member of the Swiss Science Council. In 2018 she was elected as a member of the Academia Europaea. Since 2022 she has been a corresponding member of the Göttingen Academy of Sciences and Humanities.

== Research ==
Behrens' research focuses on first and second language acquisition, linguistic theory, typology and language processing. Her dissertation dealt with the use of verbs by child acquirers of German.

== Selected publications ==
- Behrens, Heike. 1993. Temporal reference in German child language: Form and function of early verb use. Amsterdam/Zutphen: Koninglijke Wöhrmann.
- Lieven, Elena, Heike Behrens, Jennifer Speares and Michael Tomasello. 2003. Early syntactic creativity: a usage-based approach. Journal of Child Language 30 (2), 333-370. doi:10.1017/S0305000903005592
- Behrens, Heike. 2008. Corpora in language acquisition research: history, methods, perspectives. Amsterdam: John Benjamins. ISBN 9789027234766
- Behrens, Heike. 2009. Konstruktionen im Spracherwerb (Constructions in language acquisition). Zeitschrift für germanistische Linguistik 37, 427–444. doi:10.1515/ZGL.2009.030
- Behrens, Heike, and Stefan Pfänder. 2016. Experience Counts: Frequency Effects in Language. Berlin: De Gruyter. ISBN 9783110343427
