= Soviet Navy =

Maritime service branch of the Soviet Armed Forces

- Военно-морской флот СССР
- Naval ensign of the Soviet Union
- Founded: 11 February [O.S. 29 January] 1918 (Note: Russian: Декрет Совета Народных Комиссаров от 29 января (11 февраля) 1918 г. «О Социалистическом Рабоче-Крестьянском Красном Флоте», lit. 'Decree of the Council of People's Commissars dated 11 February [O.S. 29 January] 1918 On the Socialist Workers' and Peasants' Red Fleet.')
- Disbanded: 14 February 1992
- Country: Russian SFSR (1918–1922); Soviet Union (1922–1991); CIS (1991–1992)
- Type: Navy
- Size: 467,000 personnel (1984); 1,057 ships (1990); 1,172 aircraft (1990); 5 aircraft carriers (1990); 2 helicopter carriers (1990); 3 battlecruisers; 30 cruisers; 45 destroyers; 113 frigates; 124 corvettes; 63 ballistic missile submarines; 72 cruise missile submarine; 68 nuclear attack submarine; 63 conventional attack submarine; 9 auxiliary submarines; 35 amphibious warfare ships; 425 patrol boats; 1 Lun-class ekranoplan
- Part of: Soviet Armed Forces
- Nickname: Red Fleet
- March: If You'll be Lucky
- Engagements: Russian Revolution; Russian Civil War; Polish–Soviet War; Soviet–Japanese border conflicts; Invasion of Poland; Winter War (Finland); World War II (Great Patriotic War); Soviet invasion of Manchuria; Vietnam War; Cold War

Commanders
- Notable commanders: Fleet Admiral USSR Sergey Gorshkov; Fleet Admiral USSR Nikolay Kuznetsov; Vice Admiral Aleksandr Nemits; Vice Admiral Yevgeny Berens; Fleet Admiral Vasili Altfater; Admiral Ivan Yumashev

Insignia
- Naval jack

- Guards Red Banner naval ensign

The Soviet Navy (Russian: Военно-морской флот (ВМФ) СССР, romanized: Voyenno-morskoy flot (VMF) SSSR) was the naval warfare uniform service branch of the Soviet Armed Forces. Often referred to as the Red Fleet, (Note: Russian: Красный флот, romanized: Krasny flot.) the Soviet Navy made up a large part of the Soviet Union's strategic planning in the event of a conflict with the opposing superpower, the United States, during the Cold War (1945–1991). The Soviet Navy played a large role during the Cold War, either confronting the North Atlantic Treaty Organization in western Europe or power projection to maintain its sphere of influence in eastern Europe.

The Soviet Navy was divided into four major fleets: the Northern, Pacific, Black Sea, and Baltic Fleets, in addition to the Leningrad Naval Base, which was commanded separately. It also had a smaller force, the Caspian Flotilla, which operated in the Caspian Sea and was followed by a larger fleet, the 5th Squadron, in the Mediterranean Sea. The Soviet Navy included Naval Aviation, Naval Infantry, and the Coastal Artillery.

The Soviet Navy was formed from the remnants of the Imperial Russian Navy during the Russian Civil War. After the dissolution of the Soviet Union in 1991, the Russian Federation inherited the largest part of the Soviet Navy and reformed it into the Russian Navy, with smaller parts becoming the basis for navies of the newly independent post-Soviet states.

== Early history ==
=== Russian Civil War (1917–1922) ===
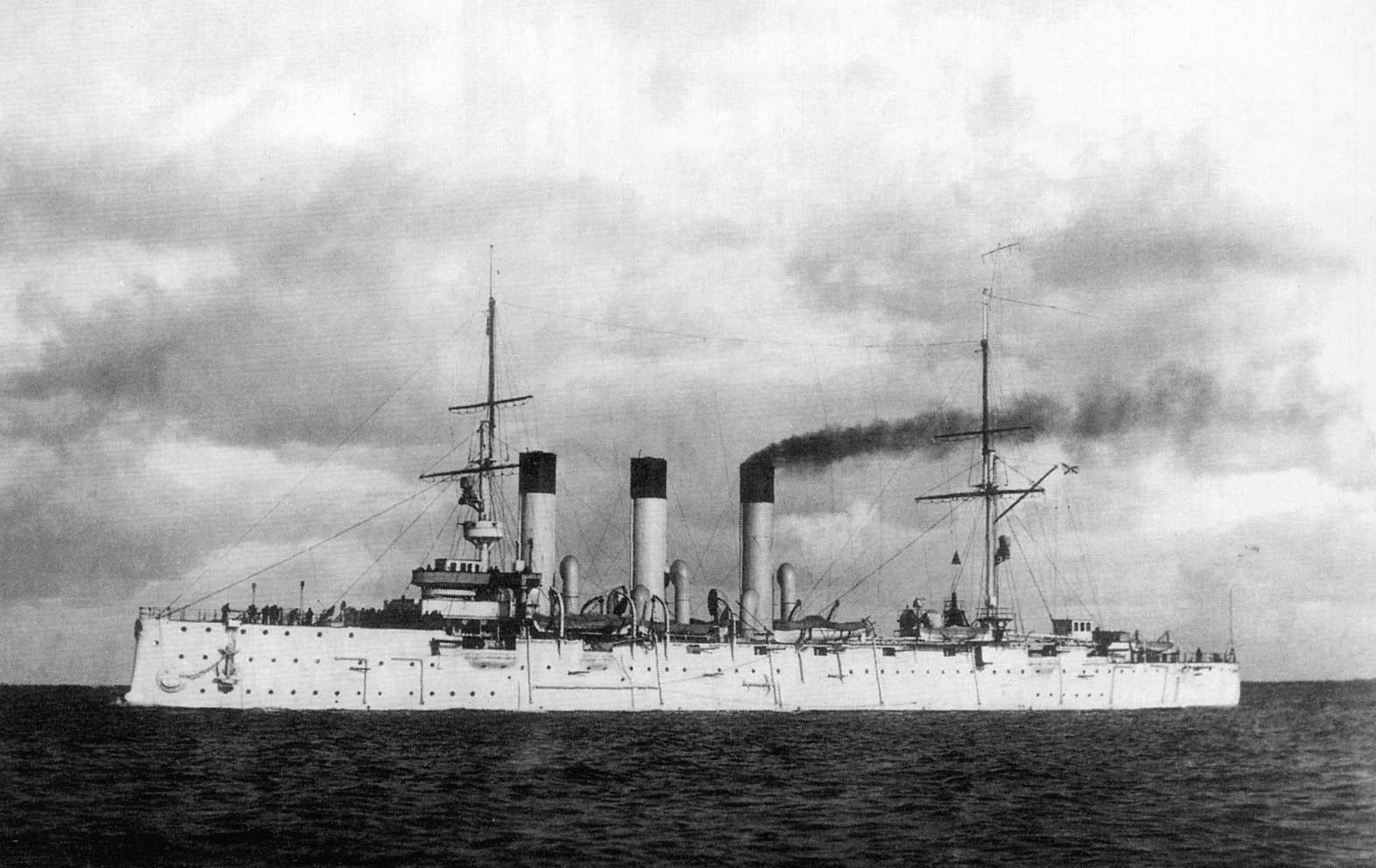
Aurora was unofficially the first Soviet Navy ship, after it mutinied against the Russian Provisional Government of Alexander Kerensky in the 1917 October Revolution

The Soviet Navy was based on a republican naval force formed from the remnants of the Imperial Russian Navy, which had been almost completely destroyed in the two Revolutions of 1917 (the February and October Revolutions), during World War I (1914–1918), the following Russian Civil War (1917–1922), and the Kronstadt rebellion in 1921. During the revolutionary period, Russian sailors deserted their ships at will and generally neglected their duties. The officers were dispersed (some were killed by the Red Terror, some joined the "White" (anti-communist) opposing armies, and others simply resigned) and most of the sailors walked off and left their ships. Work stopped in the shipyards, where uncompleted ships deteriorated rapidly.

The Black Sea Fleet fared no better than the Baltic. The Bolshevik (Communist) revolution entirely disrupted its personnel, with mass murders of officers; the ships were allowed to decay to unserviceability. At the end of April 1918, Imperial German troops moved along the Black Sea coast and entered Crimea and started to advance towards the Sevastopol naval base. The more effective ships were moved from Sevastopol to Novorossiysk where, after an ultimatum from Germany, they were scuttled by Vladimir Lenin's order.

The ships remaining in Sevastopol were captured by the Germans and then, after the later Armistice of 11 November 1918 on the Western Front which ended the War, additional Russian ships were confiscated by the British. On 1 April 1919, during the ensuing Russian Civil War when Red Army forces captured Crimea, the British Royal Navy squadron had to withdraw, but before leaving they damaged all the remaining battleships and sank thirteen new submarines.

When the opposing Czarist White Army captured Crimea in 1919, it captured and reconditioned a few units. At the end of the civil war, Wrangel's fleet, a White flotilla, moved south through the Black Sea, Dardanelles straits and the Aegean Sea to the Mediterranean Sea to Bizerta in French Tunisia on the North Africa coast, where it was interned.

The first ship of the revolutionary navy could be considered the rebellious Imperial Russian cruiser Aurora, built 1900, whose crew joined the communist Bolsheviks. Sailors of the Baltic fleet supplied the fighting force of the Bolsheviks led by Vladimir Lenin and Leon Trotsky during the October Revolution of November 1917 against the democratic provisional government of Alexander Kerensky established after the earlier first revolution of February against the Czar. Some imperial vessels continued to serve after the revolution, albeit with different names.

The Soviet Navy, established as the "Workers' and Peasants' Red Fleet" (Note: Russian: Рабоче-крестьянский Красный флот (РККФ), romanized: Raboche-krest'yansky Krasny flot (RKKF).) by a 1918 decree of the new Council of People's Commissars, installed as a temporary Russian revolutionary government, was less than service-ready during the interwar years of 1918 to 1941. After the Civil War was won by Communist forces, the Soviet government took control of all naval elements. It also ensured that all elements of the new military would remain under the firm control of the party leadership. At Kronstadt, sailors who staged a rebellion in support of urban workers in Petrograd in 1921 were suppressed and many were shot.

As the country's attentions were largely directed internally, the Navy did not have much funding or training. An indicator of its reputation was that the Soviets were not invited to participate in negotiations for the Washington Naval Treaty of 1921–1922, which limited the size and capabilities of the most powerful navies – British, American, Japanese, French, Italian. The greater part of the old fleet was sold by the Soviet government to post-war Germany for scrap.

In the Baltic Sea there remained only three much-neglected battleships, two cruisers, some ten destroyers, and a few submarines. Despite this state of affairs, the Baltic Fleet remained a significant naval formation, and the Black Sea Fleet also provided a basis for expansion. There also existed some thirty minor-waterways combat flotillas.

=== Interwar period (1922–1941) ===
During the 1930s, as the industrialization of the Soviet Union proceeded, plans were made to expand the Soviet Navy into one of the most powerful in the world. Approved by the Labour and Defence Council in 1926, the Naval Shipbuilding Program included plans to construct twelve submarines; the first six were to become known as the Dekabrist class. Beginning 4 November 1926, Technical Bureau Nº 4 (formerly the Submarine Department, and still secret), under the leadership of B.M. Malinin, managed the submarine construction works at the Baltic Shipyard.

In subsequent years, 133 submarines were built to designs developed during Malinin's management. Additional developments included the formation of the Pacific Fleet in 1932 and the Northern Fleet in 1933. The forces were to be built around a core of powerful Sovetsky Soyuz-class battleships. New shipyards were also built in the Arctic (notably at Molotovsk - renamed Severodvinsk after 1957), in the Far East and in the interior at important industrial centers that could be reached by canal from the open sea. This construction involved an estimated 120,000 slave laborers at Molotovsk alone. Nevertheless, the building program was only in its initial stages by the time the German invasion forced its suspension in 1941. As of 1939, the so-called "Big Fleet Program" envisaged a navy of 699 ships totalling over 2.5 million tons plus hundreds of auxiliary vessels totaling another half a million tons. However, most of the envisaged large ship construction programs were never completed.

By the end of 1937, the biggest fleet was the Baltic Fleet based at Leningrad, with two battleships, one training cruiser, eight destroyers including one destroyer leader, five patrol ships, two minesweepers, and some more old minesweepers. The Black Sea Fleet at Sevastopol included one battleship, three cruisers, one training cruiser, five destroyers, two patrol ships, and four minesweepers. The Northern Fleet operating from the shores of Kola Bay and Polyarny was made up of three destroyers and three patrol ships, while the Pacific Fleet had two destroyers, transferred east in 1936, and six patrol ships assembled in the Far East.

However, on the whole, the modernity of the fleet was limited. In 1940 only one cruiser (Molotov) was radar-equipped, and hydroacoustic submarine detection equipment was only deployed on the first Soviet ships in that year.

Like all elements in Soviet society, the navy was decimated by the Stalin purges of the 1930s. At least 30 percent of the Soviet Army and Navy officer corps, including three of the four fleet commanders, were arrested and shot or sent to the gulags. These included two commanders of the Pacific Fleet, (Admirals Mikhail Viktorov and Grigory Kireyev) who were shot in succession, Konstantin Dushenov, commander of the Northern Fleet, as well as a number of current and former commanders of the Black Sea Fleet. The purges are said to have "had a catastrophic effect on the Red Army's ability to perform in the early stages of World War II".

In 1939 Finland, which had refused to sign a "pact of mutual assistance" demanded by Stalin, was attacked by the USSR. The fleet played a limited role in the Winter War with Finland in 1939–1940, mostly through conducting artillery bombardments of Finnish coastal fortifications. Many fleet aircraft were involved in operations against Finland, however. However, the Baltic Fleet's planned operations in 1939 to seize the islands of Suursaari, Lavansaari, Tytärsaari and Seiskari, and to destroy Finnish coastal fortifications, were stymied by Finnish resistance. In 1940, the fleet played a supporting role in the reinvigorated and broader Soviet offensive. Subsequently, the Baltic Fleet also supported the Soviet invasion of the Baltic states in the summer of 1940.

The navy's ability to fulfill the objectives of Soviet leaders had been limited during the Spanish Civil War (1936–39) where the fleet had been hard pressed to protect the shipment of supplies to Republican forces. Nevertheless, diplomatically, the Soviet Union did secure recognition for some of its aspirations through the Montreaux Convention of 1936 (which secured peacetime access for Soviet surface ships through the Turkish Straits) and the Anglo-Soviet naval agreement of 1937.

== World War II: The Great Patriotic War (1941–1945) ==
Building a Soviet fleet was a national priority, but many senior officers were killed in the Great Purge in the late 1930s. The naval share of the national armaments budget fell from 11.5% in 1941 to 6.6% in 1944, though within the context of a massively increased budget overall.

On April 29, 1939, Nikolai Kuznetsov, 35, was appointed People's Commissar of the Navy. Kuznetsov's appointment at such a young age occurred in the context of the Stalin purges in which 3,000 officers had been shot, imprisoned or dismissed. Prior to his appointment, between August 1937 and March 1939 four successive navy chiefs and the commanders of all four fleets were executed. Under the Stalinist structure, most "decisions of even minor importance were referred back to Moscow". Admiral Kuznetsov himself was later to comment: "The navy was allowed under an unwritten rule to decide any important matters only after consulation with him (e.g. Stalin), although Molotov and Zhadanov were sometimes authorized to prepare naval decisions before they were examined by Stalin". Nevertheless, Kuznestov demonstrated a degree of initiative that, while personally dangerous, ultimately stood him in good stead once war with Germany erupted in 1941.

On June 19, without referring the matter to Stalin, Admiral Kuznetsov put the Soviet Navy in "Readiness state 2" and on June 21 in "Readiness state 1". While the Soviet Navy was not a primary objective of the Luftwaffe in the initial stages of the war (focusing instead on the Red army and air force), these alert orders still contributed to the fact that, despite German air attacks on Sevastopol (headquarters of the Black Sea Fleet) and Baltic Fleet bases on the first day of war, the Soviet Navy experienced no ship losses in the initial German blitzkrieg of 22 June.

Nevertheless, when the Soviet Union entered the Second World War, during Operation Barbarossa in June 1941, initially millions of soldiers were captured, many sailors and naval guns were detached to reinforce the Red Army; these reassigned naval forces had especially significant roles on land in the battles for Odessa, Sevastopol, Stalingrad, Novorossiysk, Tuapse, and Leningrad. The Baltic fleet was blockaded in Leningrad and Kronstadt by minefields, but the submarines escaped. The surface fleet fought with the anti-aircraft defence of the city and bombarded German positions.

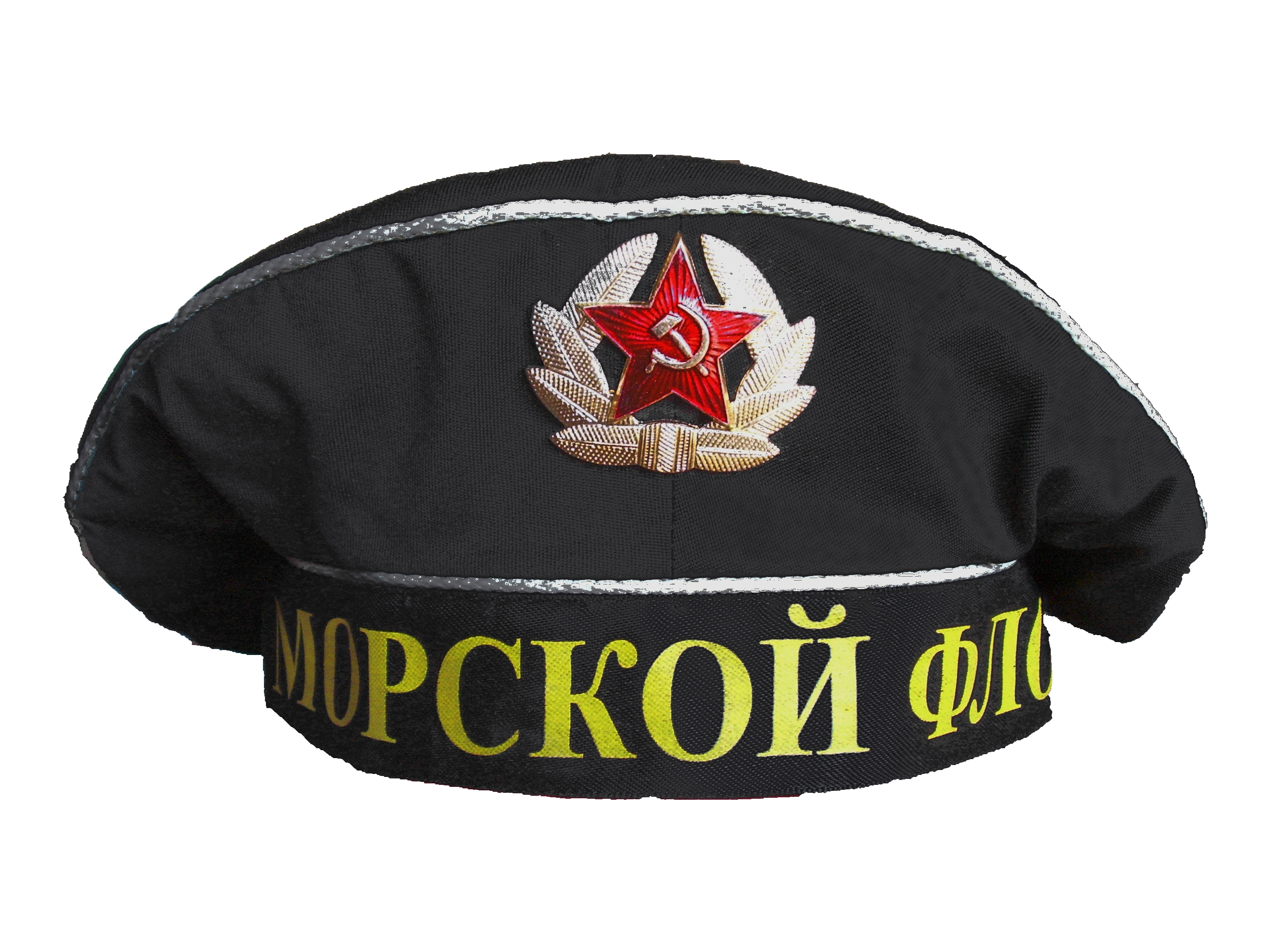
Soviet souvenir naval cap

The composition of the Soviet fleets in 1941 included:

- 3 battleships,
- 7 cruisers
- 59 destroyers (including 46 modern Gnevny-class and Soobrazitelny-class destroyers),
- 218 submarines,
- 269 torpedo boats,
- 22 patrol vessels,
- 88 minesweepers,
- 77 submarine chasers,
- and a range of other smaller vessels.

In various stages of completion were another 219 vessels including 3 battleships, 2 heavy and 7 light cruisers, 45 destroyers, and 91 submarines.

Included in the totals above are some pre-World War I ships (Novik-class destroyers, some of the cruisers, and all the battleships), some modern ships built in the USSR and Europe (like the Italian-built destroyer Tashkent and the partially completed German cruiser Lützow). During the war, many of the vessels on the slips in Leningrad and Nikolayev were destroyed (mainly by aircraft and mines), but the Soviet Navy received captured Romanian destroyers and Lend-Lease small craft from the U.S., as well as the old Royal Navy battleship HMS Royal Sovereign (renamed Arkhangelsk) and the United States Navy cruiser USS Milwaukee (renamed Murmansk) in exchange for the Soviet part of the captured Italian navy.

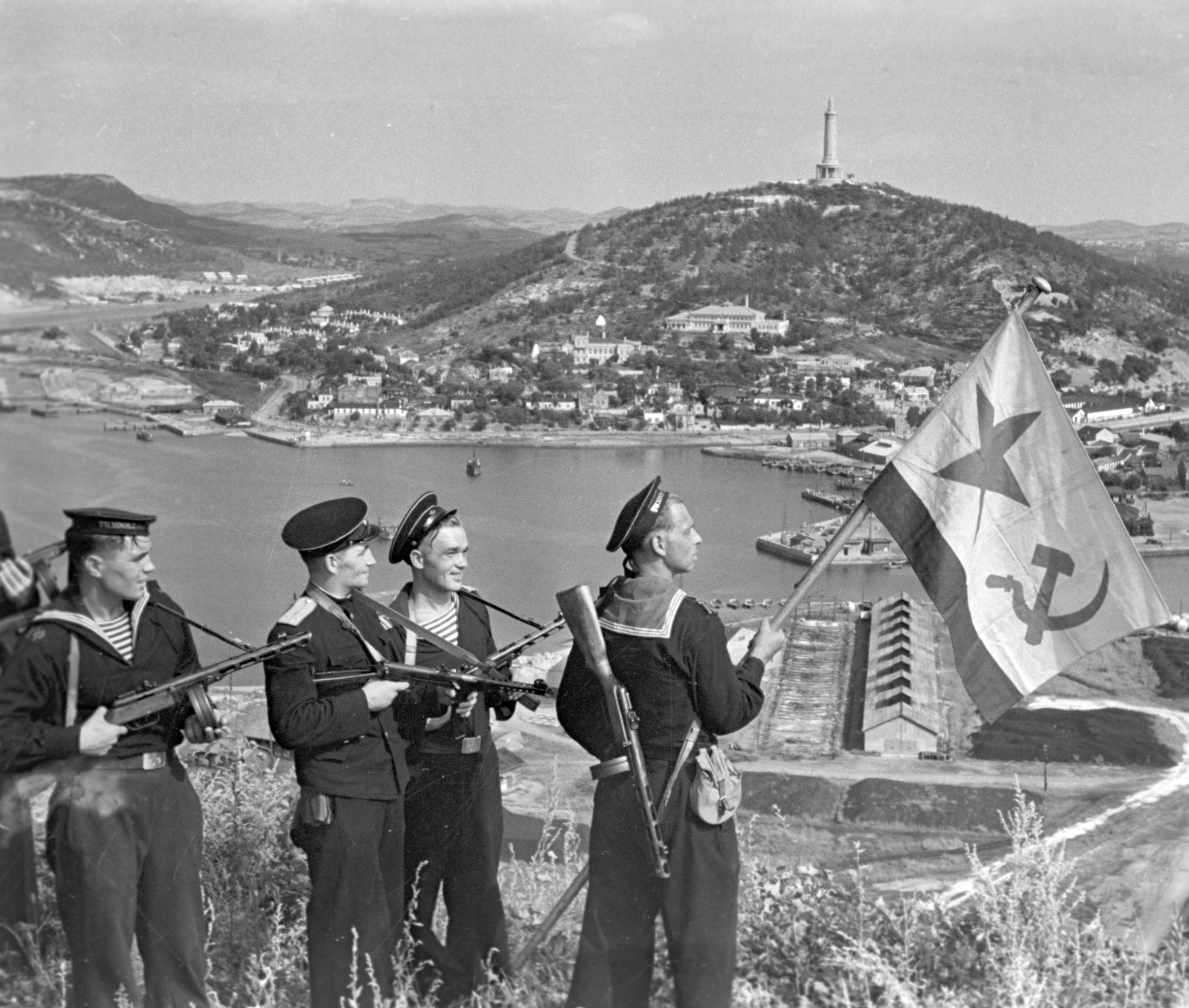
Pacific Fleet marines of the Soviet Navy hoisting the Soviet naval ensign in Port Arthur, on 1 October 1945

In the Baltic Sea, after Tallinn's capture, surface ships were blockaded in Leningrad and Kronstadt by minefields, where they participated with the anti-aircraft defence of the city and bombarded German positions. One example of Soviet resourcefulness was the battleship Marat, an ageing pre-World War I ship sunk at anchor in Kronstadt's harbour by German Junkers Ju 87 aircraft in 1941. For the rest of the war, the non-submerged part of the ship remained in use as a grounded battery. Submarines, although suffering great losses due to German and Finnish anti-submarine actions, had a major role in the war at sea by disrupting Axis navigation in the Baltic Sea. As ships were destroyed or immobilized, by early 1942 many sailors of the Baltic Fleet were transferred to the infantry to make up for ground forces shortages. Even as late as 1944–45, the German Navy still enjoyed superiority at sea. Nevertheless, by January 1944 the navy was strong enough to secretly transport 30,000 troops to the bridgehead at Oranienbaum and break the siege of Leningrad.

In the Black Sea, many ships were damaged by minefields and Axis aviation, but they helped defend naval bases and supply them while besieged, as well as later evacuating them. Heavy naval guns and sailors helped defend port cities during long sieges by Axis armies. In the Arctic Ocean, Soviet Northern Fleet destroyers (Novik class, Type 7, and Type 7U) and smaller craft participated with the anti-aircraft and anti-submarine defence of Allied convoys conducting Lend-Lease cargo shipping. In the Pacific Ocean, the Soviet Union was not at war with Japan before 1945, so some destroyers were transferred to the Northern Fleet.

From the beginning of hostilities, Soviet Naval Aviation provided air support to naval and land operations involving the Soviet Navy. This service was responsible for the operation of shore-based floatplanes, long-range flying boats, catapult-launched and vessel-based planes, and land-based aircraft designated for naval use.

As post-war spoils, the Soviets received several Italian and Japanese warships and much German naval engineering and architectural documentation.

== Cold War (1945–1991) ==
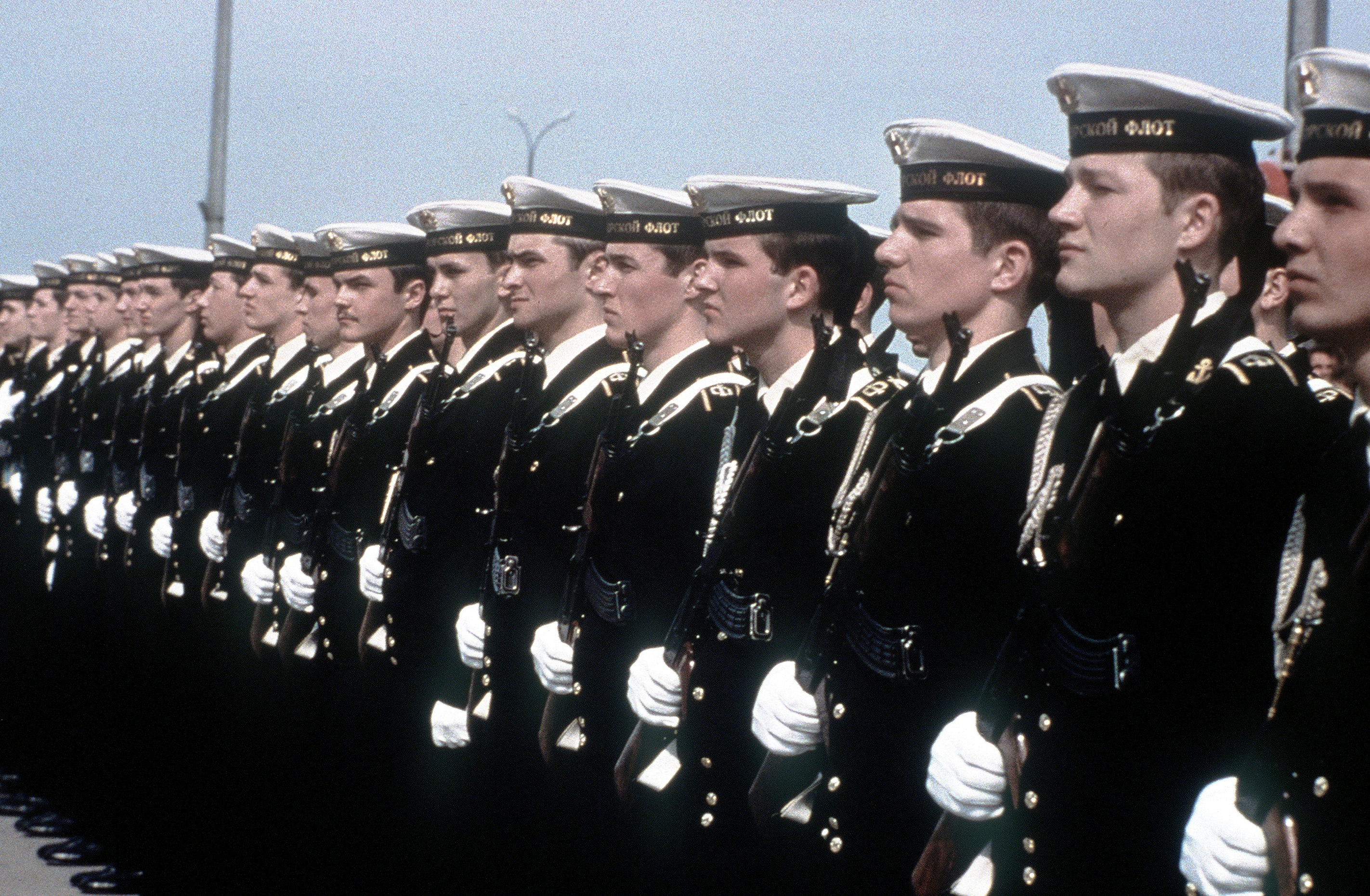
Soviet Navy enlisted personnel stand at attention (1982)

In February 1946, the Red Fleet was renamed and became known as the Soviet Navy (Russian: Советский Военно-Морской Флот, romanized: Sovyetsky Voyenno-Morskoy Flot, lit. 'Soviet Military Maritime Fleet'). After the war, the Soviets concluded that they needed a navy that could disrupt supply lines, and display a small naval presence to the developing world. As the natural resources the Soviet Union needed were available on the Eurasian landmass, it did not need a navy to protect a large commercial fleet, as the western navies were configured to do. Later, countering seaborne nuclear delivery systems became another significant objective of the navy, and an impetus for expansion.

The Soviet Navy was structured around submarines and small, maneuverable, tactical vessels. The Soviet shipbuilding program kept yards busy constructing submarines based upon World War II German Kriegsmarine designs, which were launched with great frequency during the immediate post-war years. Afterwards, through a combination of indigenous research and technology obtained through espionage from Nazi Germany and the Western nations, the Soviets gradually improved their submarine designs.

The Soviets were quick to equip their surface fleet with missiles of various sorts. Indeed, it became a feature of Soviet design to place large missiles onto relatively small, but fast, missile boats, while in the West such an approach would never have been considered tactically feasible. The Soviet Navy did also possess several very large and well-armed guided-missile cruisers, like those of the Kirov and Slava classes. By the 1970s, Soviet submarine technology was in some respects more advanced than in the West, and several of their submarine types were considered superior to their American rivals.

Through the long tenure (1956 to 1985) of Admiral Sergei Gorshkov as commander of the navy, Soviet sea power expanded to incorporate a global presence and posture. The Cuban Missile Crisis of 1962 had exposed some of the weaknesses of this posture as the Soviet Navy found that their blue water capability was too limited to enable them to escort their ships through the quarantine area imposed by the US Navy. Their resulting over reliance on diesel-electric submarines with limited capability put them at a decided disadvantage, with some reports suggesting that the commander of Soviet submarine B-59 considered the use of nuclear torpedoes when he, wrongly, initially believed his vessel to be under attack by American forces.

The Soviet Navy, Gorshkov believed, should incorporate an enhanced blue water presence and should be able to play a strong role in supporting the Soviet Union's political objectives and exerting its influence abroad. In that sense his thinking paralleled that of the American naval strategist Alfred Thayer Mahan that national greatness was inextricably linked to the sea.

During the 1973 Yom Kipur War, and in contrast to limitations which had existed on it at the time of the Cuban Missile Crisis, the Soviet Navy played a much more active role in the provision of support to both Syria and Egypt in that war. The Soviet Navy deployed more than 50 surface warships and submarines in the Mediterranean during the crisis and threats by the USSR to intervene in the conflict led the United States to raise the alert status of its nuclear forces to DEFCON 3. Naval activities by the Soviet Navy's 5th Operational Squadron in the Mediterranean included intensive anti-carrier exercises thus raising the potential danger for the US 6th Fleet. Nevertheless conflict was averted when the Soviet leadership lifted its intervention threat following the raising of the US nuclear alert level.

Global Soviet naval activity continued to increase in the 1970s and 1980s with the navy supporting the military interventions by Soviet Bloc forces in both the Angolan Civil War (after 1975) and in the Ethiopian Civil War (from the latter 1970s).

During the 1979 Sino-Vietnam border war, the Pacific Fleet deployed a task force of ships and submarines to the South China Sea. The deployment, designed to support Vietnam and deter potentially more aggressive Chinese action, was complemented by a similarly extensive presence of Soviet vessels in the Indian Ocean, and was consistent with Admiral Gorshkov's objectives to extend "Soviet military, political and economic influence throughout the world."

The 5th Operational Squadron (ru:5-я Средиземноморская эскадра кораблей ВМФ) operated in the Mediterranean Sea. The squadron's main function was to prevent largescale naval ingress into the Black Sea, which could bypass the need for any invasion to be over the Eurasian land mass. The flagship of the squadron was for a long period the Sverdlov-class cruiser Zhdanov.

In 1984, the Soviet Navy was reported to be operating approximately 2,400 ships and craft. While the majority of these consisted of "noncombatant auxiliaries and coastal or inshore vessels", the principal warfighting elements nevertheless included 289 major surface combatants and 380 submarines. These capabilities made it a significant rival to the United States Navy.

=== Carriers and aviation ===
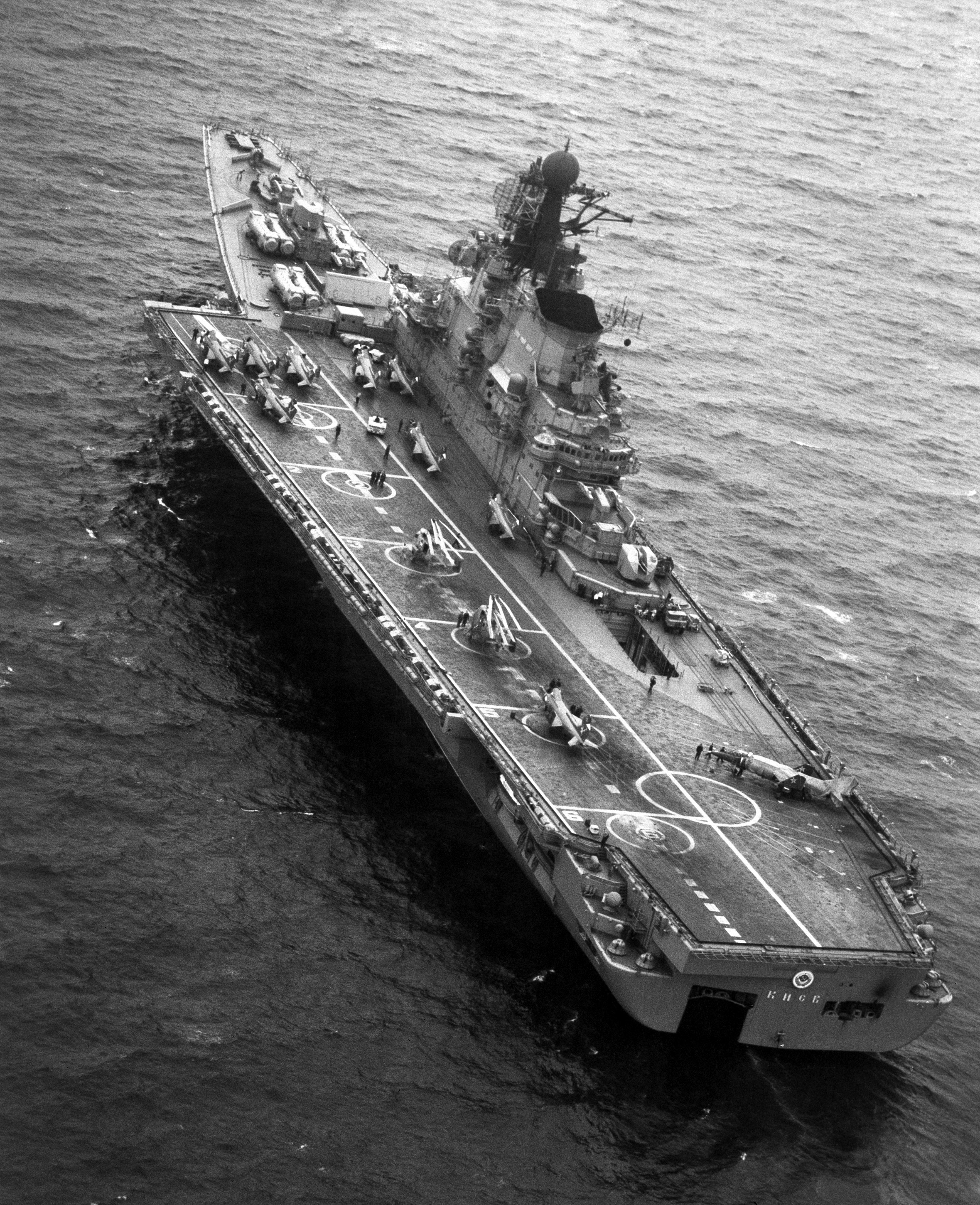
Kiev, an aviation cruiser, and the rest of her class constituted an important component of the Soviet anti-submarine warfare system

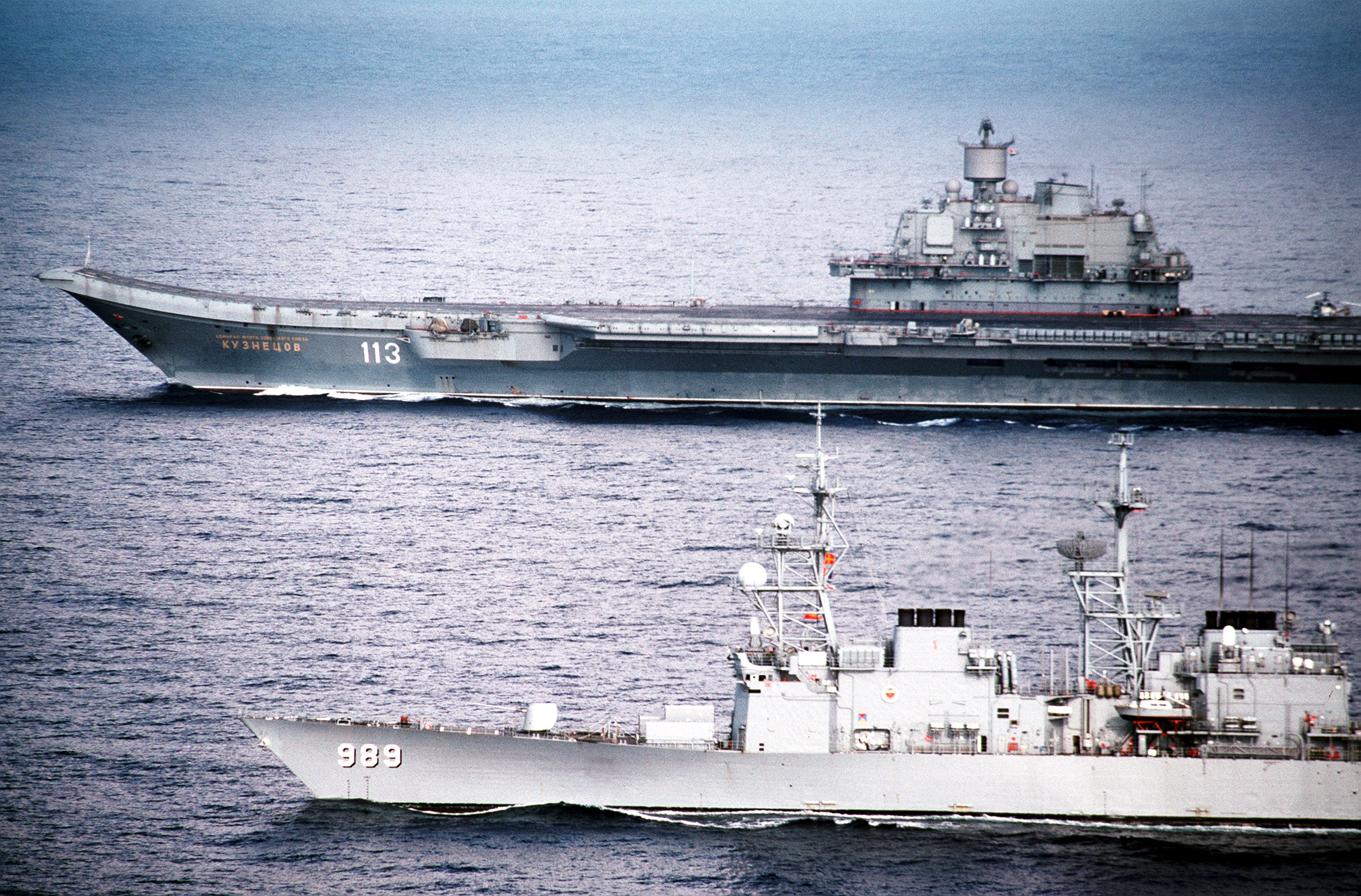
The Russian aircraft carrier Admiral Kuznetsov deployed off the coast of Italy, as seen patrolling with USS Deyo in 1991

In the strategic planning laid by the Soviet strategists, the aircraft carriers were seen as relatively unimportant and received little attention, as Moscow focused on a naval strategy designed to disrupt sea lines of communication. Nonetheless, the Soviet navy pursued an aircraft carrier program as a way of matching stoking competition with the U.S. Navy.

The Soviet Navy still had the mission of confronting Western submarines, creating a need for large surface vessels to carry anti-submarine helicopters. During 1968 and 1969 the Moskva-class helicopter carriers were first deployed, succeeded by the first of four aircraft-carrying cruisers of the Kiev class, in 1973. Both types were capable of operating ASW helicopters, and the Kiev class also operated V/STOL aircraft (e.g., the Yak-38 'Forger'); they were designed to operate for fleet defense, primarily within range of land-based Soviet Naval Aviation aircraft.

During the 1970s the Soviets began Project 1153 Orel (Eagle), whose stated purpose was to create an aircraft carrier capable of basing fixed-wing fighter aircraft in defense of the deployed fleet. The project was canceled during the planning stages when strategic priorities shifted once more.

In 1981, the Soviet Navy ordered its first true aircraft carrier, Tbilisi, subsequently renamed Admiral of the Fleet of the Soviet Union Kuznetsov, which carries Sukhoi Su-33 'Flanker-D' and MiG-29 fighters, as well as Ka-27 helicopters.

A distinctive feature of Soviet aircraft carriers has been their offensive missile armament (as well as long-range anti-aircraft warfare armament), again representing a fleet-defense operational concept, in distinction to the Western emphasis on shore-strike missions from distant deployment. A second carrier (pre-commissioning name Varyag) was under construction when the Soviet Union disintegrated in 1991. Construction stopped and the ship was sold later, incomplete, to the People's Republic of China by Ukraine, which inherited part of the old Soviet fleet after the break-up of the USSR. It was commissioned into the People's Liberation Army Navy in 2012 as the Liaoning.

Soon after the launch of this second Kuznetsov-class ship, the Soviet Navy began the construction of an improved aircraft carrier design, Ulyanovsk, which was to have been slightly larger than the Kuznetsov class and nuclear-powered. The project was terminated, and what little structure had been initiated in the building ways was scrapped.

In part to perform the functions usual to carrier-borne aircraft, the Soviet Navy deployed large numbers of strategic bombers in a maritime role, with the Soviet Naval Aviation (Voenno-vozdushnye sily Voenno-morskogo flota, lit. 'Naval Air Force'; abbr. VVS VMF). Strategic bombers like the Tupolev Tu-16 'Badger' and Tu-22M 'Backfire' were deployed with high-speed anti-shipping missiles. Previously believed to be interceptors of NATO supply convoys traveling the sea lines of communication across the North Atlantic Ocean between Europe and North America, the primary role of these aircraft was to protect the Soviet mainland from attacks by U.S. carrier task forces.

=== Submarines ===
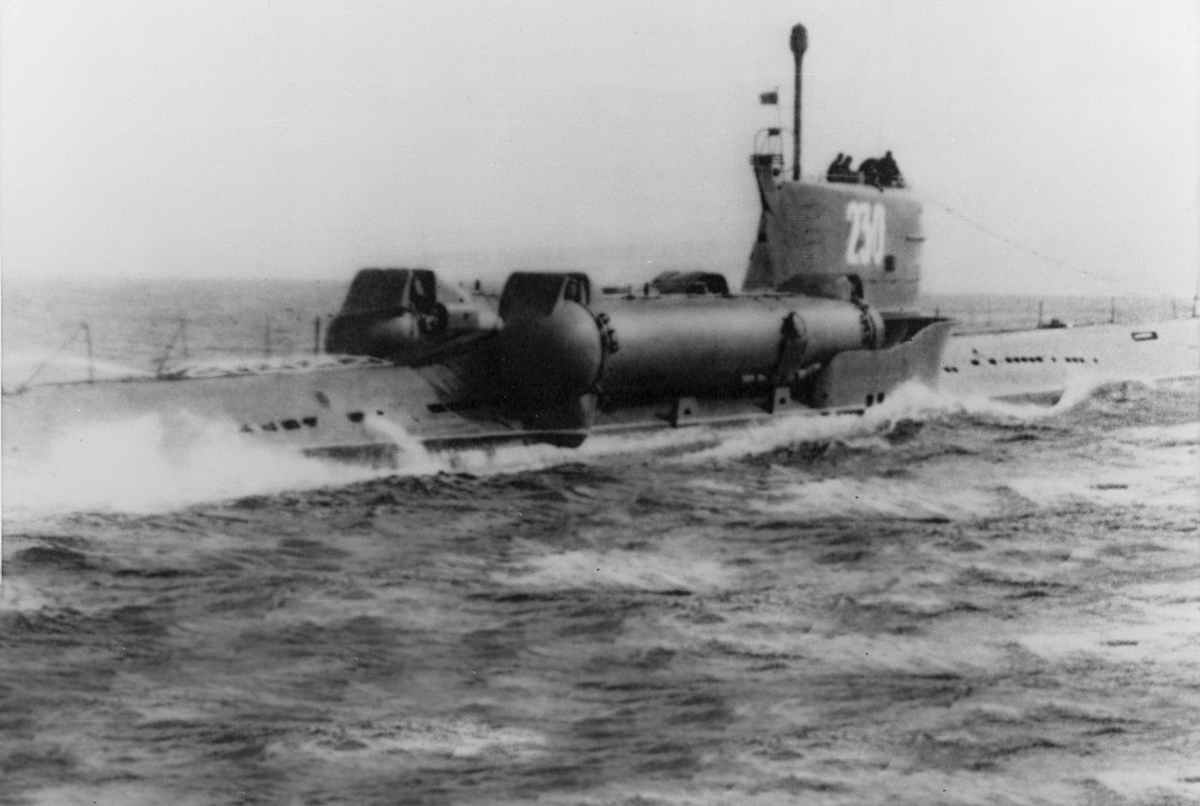
A Whiskey Twin Cylinder-class guided missile submarine, an important platform for launching anti-ship strikes

Due to the Soviet Union's geographic position, submarines were considered the capital ships of the Navy. Submarines could penetrate attempts at blockade, either in the constrained waters of the Baltic and Black Seas or in the remote reaches of the USSR's western Arctic, while surface ships were clearly much easier to find and attack. The USSR had entered the Second World War with more submarines than Germany, but geography and the speed of the German attack precluded it from effectively using its more numerous fleet to its advantage. Because of its opinion that "quantity had a quality of its own" and at the insistence of Admiral of the Fleet Sergey Gorshkov, the Soviet Navy continued to operate many first-generation missile submarines, built in the early 1960s, until the end of the Cold War in 1991.

In some respects, including speed and reactor technology, Soviet submarines achieved unique successes, but for most of the era lagged their Western counterparts in overall capability. In addition to their relatively high speeds and great operating depths they were difficult anti-submarine warfare (ASW) targets to destroy because of their multiple compartments, their large reserve buoyancy, and especially their double-hulled design.

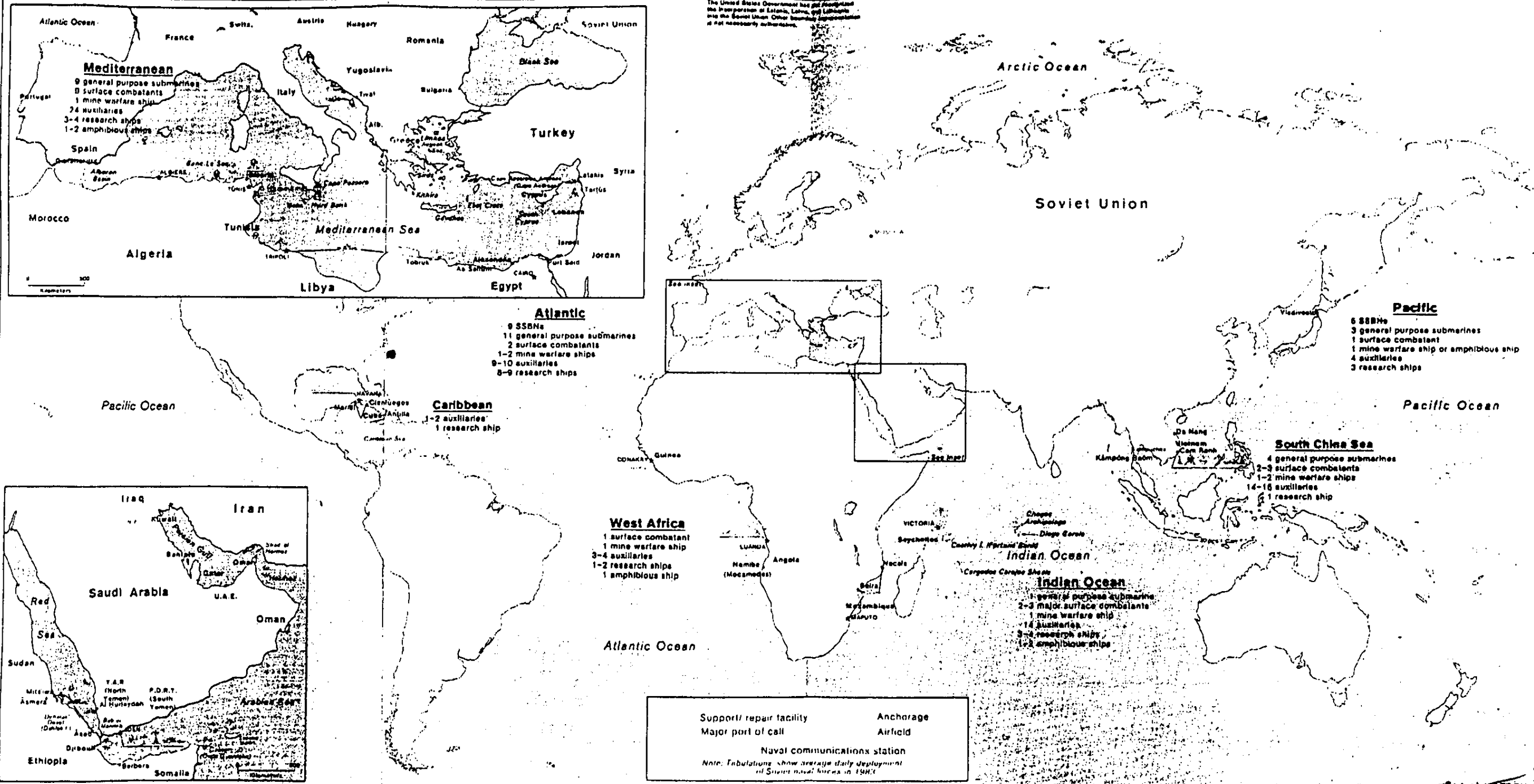
Overseas Facilities and Anchorages Used by Soviet Naval Forces, mid-1980s

Their principal shortcomings were insufficient noise-damping (American boats were quieter) and primitive sonar technology. Acoustics was a particularly interesting type of information that the Soviets sought about the West's submarine-production methods, and the long-active John Anthony Walker spy ring may have made a major contribution to their knowledge of such.

The Soviet Navy possessed numerous purpose-built guided missile submarines, such as the Oscar-class submarine, as well as many ballistic missile and attack submarines; their Typhoon class are the world's largest submarines. While Western navies assumed that the Soviet attack submarine force was designed for interception of NATO convoys, the Soviet leadership never prepared their submarines for such a mission. Over the years Soviet submarines suffered a number of accidents, most notably on several nuclear boats. The most famous incidents include the Yankee-class submarine K-219, and the Mike-class submarine Komsomolets, both lost to fire, and the far more menacing nuclear reactor leak on the Hotel-class submarine K-19, narrowly averted by her captain. Inadequate nuclear safety, poor damage control, and quality-control issues during construction (particularly on the earlier submarines) were typical causes of accidents. On several occasions there were alleged collisions with American submarines. None of these, however, has been confirmed officially by the U.S. Navy. On 28 August 1976, K-22 (Echo II) collided with frigate USS Voge in the Mediterranean Sea.

At the height of the 1962 Cuban Missile Crisis, the Foxtrot-class submarine B-59 was involved in a nuclear close call. Sent to the Sargasso Sea to support the Soviet nuclear arsenal buildup on Cuba it came under pursuit from blockading units of the US Navy, which dropped signalling depth charges. Out of contact with Moscow for days, and with struggling life support conditions, Captain Valentin Savitsky suspected a US-Soviet war had begun, and ordered preparations to fire the submarine's single T-5 nuclear torpedo. Requiring agreement of the three officers, detachment chief of staff Vasily Arkhipov alone prevented the nuclear launch order, and the submarine surfaced and returned to the USSR as the crisis abated. The event was publicly revealed at the 40th anniversary Cuban Missile Crisis Havana Conference in 2002.

=== Transition ===
After the dissolution of the USSR and the end of the Cold War, the Soviet Navy, like other branches of Armed Forces, eventually lost some of its units to former Soviet Republics, and was left without funding. Some ships were transferred to former Soviet states:

- Baltic Sea: Estonian Navy, Latvian Navy and Lithuanian Navy. All three countries joined NATO in 2004.
- Black Sea: Ukrainian Navy and Georgian Navy. The Georgian Navy was defeated by the Russian Navy at the battle off Abkhazia in 2008. Most of the Ukrainian Navy ships were captured by Russia during the annexation of Crimea in 2014.
- Caspian Sea: Azerbaijani Navy, Kazakh Navy and Turkmen Navy.

=== Soviet Naval Aviation ===
The regular Soviet naval aviation units were created in 1918. They participated in the Russian Civil War, cooperating with the ships and the army during the combats at Petrograd, on the Baltic Sea, the Black Sea, the Volga, the Kama River, Northern Dvina and on the Lake Onega. The newborn Soviet Naval Air Force consisted of only 76 obsolete hydroplanes. Scanty and technically imperfect, it was mostly used for resupplying the ships and the army.

In the second half of the 1920s, the Naval Aviation order of battle began to grow. It received new reconnaissance hydroplanes, bombers, and fighters. In the mid-1930s, the Soviets created the Naval Air Force in the Baltic Fleet, the Black Sea Fleet and the Soviet Pacific Fleet. The importance of naval aviation had grown significantly by 1938–1940, to become one of the main components of the Soviet Navy. By this time, the Soviets had created formations and units of the torpedo and bomb aviation.

=== Naval Infantry ===
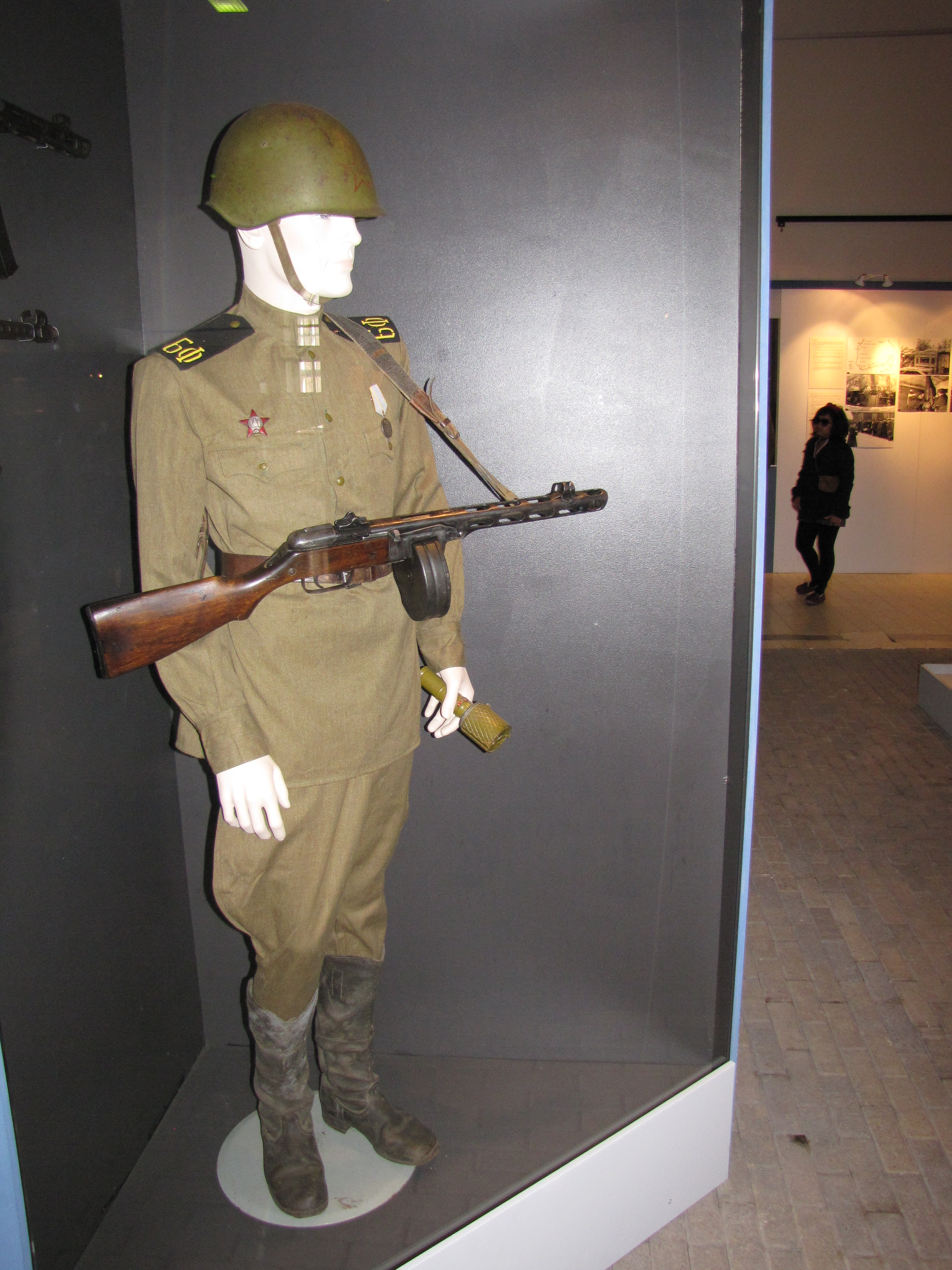
World War II Soviet Marines uniform

During World War II, about 350,000 Soviet sailors fought on land. At the beginning of the war, the navy had only one naval brigade in the Baltic fleet, but began forming and training other battalions. These eventually were:

- 6 Naval Infantry regiments (650 marines in two battalions)
- 40 naval infantry brigades of 5–10 battalions, formed from surplus ships' crews. Five brigades were awarded Gvardy (Guards) status.
- Numerous smaller units
- 1 division – the 55th Naval Infantry Division, formerly a Red Army formation

The military situation demanded the deployment of large numbers of marines on land fronts, so the Naval Infantry contributed to the defense of Moscow, Leningrad, Odessa, Sevastopol, Stalingrad, Novorossiysk, and Kerch. The Naval Infantry conducted over 114 landings, most of which were carried out by platoons and companies. In general, however, Naval Infantry served as regular infantry, without any amphibious training.

They conducted four major operations: two during the Battle of the Kerch Peninsula, one during the Caucasus Campaign and one as part of the Landing at Moonsund, in the Baltic. During the war, five brigades and two battalions of naval infantry were awarded Guards status. Nine brigades and six battalions were awarded decorations, and many were given honorary titles. The title Hero of the Soviet Union was bestowed on 122 members of naval infantry units.

The Soviet experience in amphibious warfare in World War II contributed to the development of Soviet combined arms operations. Many members of the Naval Infantry were parachute trained, conducting more drops and successful parachute operations than the Soviet Airborne Troops (VDV).

The Naval Infantry was disbanded in 1947, with some units being transferred to the Coastal Defence Forces.

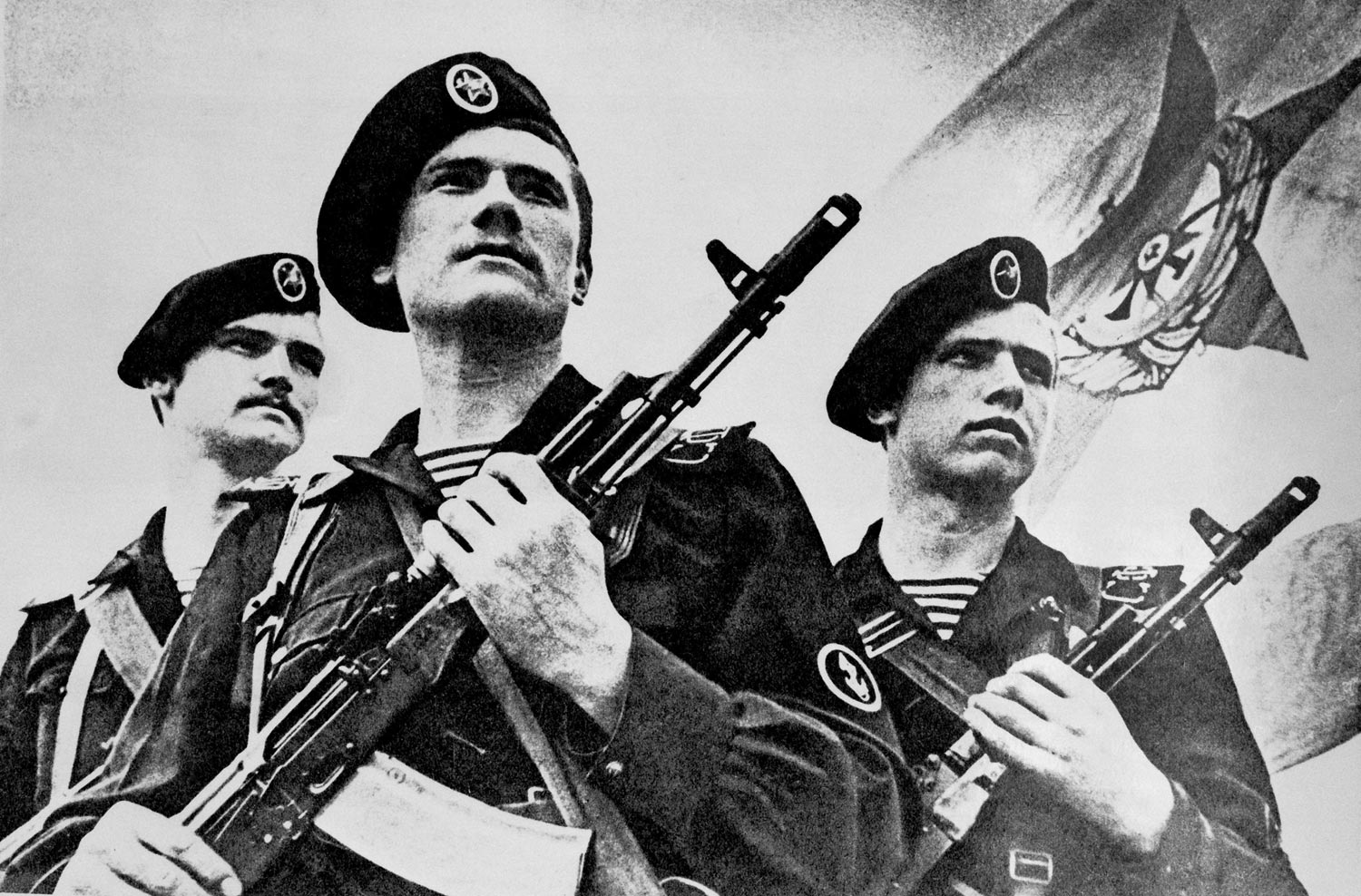
Soviet Naval Infantrymen in 1985

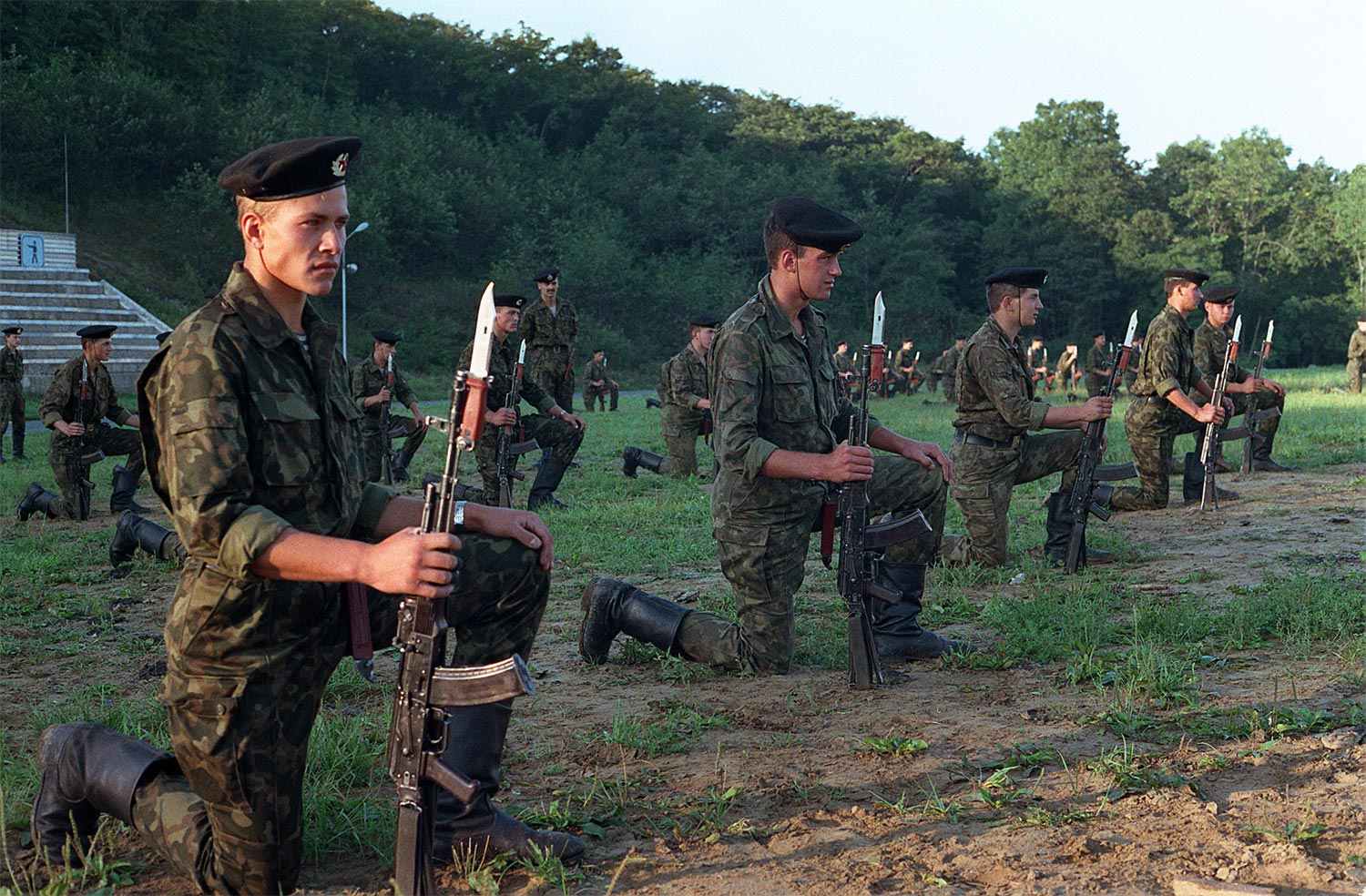
Soviet Naval Infantrymen during a demonstration in 1990

In 1961, the Naval Infantry was re-formed and became one of the active combat services of the Navy. Each Fleet was assigned a Marine unit of regiment (and later brigade) size. The Naval Infantry received amphibious versions of standard Armoured fighting vehicle, including tanks used by the Soviet Army.

By 1989, the Naval Infantry numbered 18,000 marines, organized into a Marine Division and 4 independent Marine brigades;

- 55th Naval Infantry Division, at Vladivostok (Pacific Fleet)
- 61st Kirkenes Naval Infantry Brigade at Pechenga (Northern Fleet)
- 175th Naval Infantry Brigade, at Tumanny (Northern Fleet)
- 336th Guards Naval Infantry Brigade at Baltiysk (Baltic Fleet)
- 810th Naval Infantry Brigade, at Sevastopol (Black Sea Fleet)

By the end of the Cold War, the Soviet Navy had over eighty landing ships, as well as two Ivan Rogov-class landing ships. The latter could transport one infantry battalion with 40 armoured vehicles and their landing craft. (One of the Rogov ships has since been retired.)

At 75 units, the Soviet Union had the world's largest inventory of combat air-cushion assault craft. In addition, many of the 2,500 vessels of the Soviet merchant fleet (Morflot) could off-load weapons and supplies during amphibious landings.

On 18 November 1990, on the eve of the Paris Summit where the Conventional Armed Forces in Europe (CFE) Treaty and the Vienna Document on Confidence and Security-Building Measures (CSBMs) were signed, Soviet data was presented under the so-called initial data exchange. This showed a rather sudden emergence of three so-called coastal defence divisions (including the 3rd at Klaipėda in the Baltic Military District, the 126th in the Odessa Military District and seemingly the 77th Guards Motor Rifle Division with the Northern Fleet), along with three artillery brigades/regiments, subordinate to the Soviet Navy, which had previously been unknown as such to NATO.

Much of the equipment, which was commonly understood to be treaty limited (TLE) was declared to be part of the naval infantry. The Soviet argument was that the CFE excluded all naval forces, including its permanently land-based components. The Soviet Government eventually became convinced that its position could not be maintained.

A proclamation of the Soviet government on 14 July 1991, which was later adopted by its successor states, provided that all "treaty-limited equipment" (tanks, artillery, and armored vehicles) assigned to naval infantry or coastal defense forces, would count against the total treaty entitlement.

== Heads of the Soviet Naval Forces ==
=== Commanders of the Naval Forces ===
Commanders of Naval Forces of the RSFSR ("KoMorSi")

- Vasili Mikhailovich Altfater (15 October 1918 – 22 April 1919),
- Yevgeny Andreyevich Berens (24 April 1919 – 5 February 1920),
- Aleksandr Vasiliyevich Nemits (5 February 1920 – 22 November 1921).

Commander-in-Chief's Assistant for Naval Affairs (from 27 August 1921)

Commanders-in-Chief of the Naval Forces of the USSR ("NaMorSi") (from 1 January 1924)

- Eduard Samoilovich Pantserzhansky (22 November 1921 – 9 December 1924),
- Vyacheslav Ivanovich Zof (9 December 1924 – 23 August 1926),
- Romuald Adamovich Muklevich (23 August 1926 – 11 June 1931),
- Fleet Flag-officer 1st Rank Vladimir Mitrofanovich Orlov (11 June 1931 – 15 August 1937),
- Fleet Flag-officer 2nd Rank Lev Mikhailovich Galler (10 July – 15 August 1937) Acting,
- Fleet Flag-officer 1st Rank Mikhail Vladimirovich Viktorov (15 August 1937 – 30 December 1937).

People's Commissars of the Navy ("NarKom VMF USSR") (from 30 December 1937)

- Army Commissar 1st Rank Pyotr Alexandrovich Smirnov (30 December 1937 – 5 November 1938),
- Army Commander 1st Rank Mikhail Petrovich Frinovsky (5 November 1938 – 20 March 1939),
- Admiral Nikolai Gerasimovich Kuznetsov (from 27 April 1939).

Commanders-in-Chief of the Soviet Navy ("GlavKom VMF") (from 1943)

- Fleet Admiral Nikolai Gerasimovich Kuznetsov (to January 1947),
- Admiral Ivan Stepanovich Yumashev (17 January 1947 – 20 July 1951),
- Fleet Admiral of the Soviet Union Nikolai Gerasimovich Kuznetsov (20 July 1951 – 5 January 1956), second term,
- Fleet Admiral of the Soviet Union Sergey Georgyevich Gorshkov (5 January 1956 – 8 December 1985), considered the officer most responsible for reforming the Soviet Navy,
- Fleet Admiral Vladimir Nikolayevich Chernavin (8 December 1985 – December 1991; CIS Navy through August 1992).

=== Chiefs of the General Staff of the Navy ===
Chief of the Naval General Staff

- Behrens, Evgeny Andreevich (1 November 1917 – 22 May 1919)
- Vecheslov, Vladimir Stepanovich (wreed, 22 May – 11 September 1919)
- Melentyev, Alexander Nikolaevich (11 September 1919 – 27 August 1921)

Chief of Staff of the Commander of the Republic Naval Forces

- Radzievsky, Boris Stepanovich (22 July 1919 – 3 July 1920)

Chief of Staff of All Republic Maritime Forces

- Radzievsky, Boris Stepanovich (3 July 1920 – 11 January 1921)
- Dombrovsky, Alexey Vladimirovich (11 January 1921 – 27 August 1921)

Chief of the Naval Staff of the Republic

- Dombrovsky, Alexey Vladimirovich (27 August 1921 – 23 December 1923)

Chief of Staff of the RKKF

- Dombrovsky, Alexey Vladimirovich (23 December 1923 – 17 December 1924)
- Stepanov, Georgy Andreevich (wreed, 17 December 1924 – 2 January 1925)
- Blinov, Sergei Pavlovich (17 December 1924 – 31 August 1926)

Head of the Training Directorate of the UVMS of the Red Army

- Toshakov, Arkady Alexandrovich (31 August 1926 – 23 August 1927, vred until 29 October 1926)
- Petrov, Mikhail Alexandrovich (23 August 1927 – 12 October 1930)
- Ludry, Ivan Martynovich (28 November 1930 – 9 March 1932)
- Panzerzhansky, Eduard Samuilovich (13 April – 4 October 1932)

Head of the 1st Directorate of the UVMS of the Red Army

- Gorsky, Mikhail Emelyanovich (4 October 1932 – 20 January 1935)

Head of the 2nd Directorate of the UVMS of the Red Army

- Panzerzhansky, Eduard Samuilovich (4 October 1932 – 20 January 1935)

Head of the 1st Department of the Red Army Naval Forces Directorate

- Panzerzhansky, Eduard Samuilovich (20 January 1935 – 5 March 1937), 1st rank flagship

Chief of Staff of the Red Army Naval Forces

- Stasevich, Pavel Grigorievich (20 March – 19 August 1937), Captain 1st Rank
- Kalachev, Vladimir Petrovich (19 August 1937 – 3 February 1938), Captain 1st Rank

Chief of the Main Naval Staff of the Navy

- Haller, Lev Mikhailovich (10 January 1938 – 23 October 1940), flagship of the 2nd rank fleet
- Isakov, Ivan Stepanovich (23 October 1940 – 21 April 1945), Admiral, from 1944 Admiral of the Fleet
- Alafuzov, Vladimir Antonovich (Wreed, July 1942 - March 1943), Rear Admiral
- Stepanov, Georgy Andreevich (Wreed, March 1943 - July 1944), Vice Admiral
- Alafuzov, Vladimir Antonovich (Wreed, July 1944 - April 1945), Vice Admiral, from 1944 Admiral
- Kucherov, Stepan Grigorievich (21 April 1945 – 18 February 1946), Admiral

Chief of the Main Staff of the Navy

- Isakov, Ivan Stepanovich (18 February 1946 – 19 February 1947), Admiral of the Fleet
- Golovko, Arseny Grigorievich (19 February 1947 – 10 February 1950), Admiral

Chief of the Naval General Staff

- Golovko, Arseny Grigorievich (10 February 1950 – 6 August 1952), Admiral
- Eliseev, Ivan Dmitrievich (interim, 6 August 1952 – 10 March 1953), Vice Admiral

Chief of the General Staff of the Navy

- Eliseev, Ivan Dmitrievich (interim, 15 March – 11 May 1953), Vice Admiral
- Fokin, Vitaly Alekseevich (11 May 1953 – 16 March 1955), Vice Admiral, from 1953 Admiral

Chief of the Main Staff of the Navy

- Fokin, Vitaly Alekseevich (16 March 1955 – 19 February 1958), Admiral
- Zozulya, Fyodor Vladimirovich (19 February 1958 – 25 May 1964), admiral, died on 21 April 1964.
- Sergeev, Nikolai Dmitrievich (13 June 1964 – 1 July 1977), Vice Admiral, Admiral from 1965, Admiral of the Fleet from 1970
- Egorov, Georgy Mikhailovich (1 July 1977 – 18 November 1981), Admiral of the Fleet
- Chernavin, Vladimir Nikolaevich (16 December 1981 – 29 November 1985), Admiral of the Fleet
- Makarov, Konstantin Valentinovich (30 December 1985 – 12 September 1992), Admiral, since 1989 Admiral of the Fleet

== See also ==
- Naval history of World War II
- 1966 Soviet submarine global circumnavigation
- List of ships of the Soviet Navy
- List of Soviet navy flags
- List of Russian admirals
- Soviet naval ballistic systems

Fleet of the Soviet Navy

- Red Banner Northern Fleet
- Twice Red Banner Baltic Fleet
- Red Banner Black Sea
- Red Banner Pacific Fleet (Soviet Far East)
- Red Banner Caspian Flotilla
- Fifth Eskadra (Mediterranean Sea)
- Eight Eskadra (Indian Ocean)
- 17th Eskadra (Indochina)

== Bibliography ==
- Goldstein, Lyle; Zhukov, Yuri (2004). "A Tale of Two Fleets: A Russian Perspective on the 1973 Naval Standoff in the Mediterranean". Naval War College Review.
- Goldstein, Lyle; John Hattendorf; Zhukov, Yuri. (2005) "The Cold War at Sea: An International Appraisal". Journal of Strategic Studies. ISSN 0140-2390
- Gorshkov, Sergeĭ Georgievich. Red Star Rising at Sea (Annapolis: Naval Institute Press, 1974)
- Mawdsley, Evan (1990). "The Fate of Stalin's Naval Program". Warship International. XXVII (4): 400–405. ISSN 0043-0374.
- Nilsen, Thomas; Kudrik, Igor; Nikitin, Aleksandr (1996). Report 2: 1996: The Russian Northern Fleet. Oslo/St. Petersburg: Bellona Foundation. ISBN 82-993138-5-6. Chapter 8, "Nuclear submarine accidents".
- Oberg, James (1988). Uncovering Soviet Disasters. New York: Random House. ISBN 0-394-56095-7.
- Rohwer, Jürgen, and Mikhail S. Monakov, Stalin's Ocean-Going Fleet: Soviet Naval Strategy and Shipbuilding Programmes, 1935–1953 (Psychology Press, 2001)
- Sokolov, Alexei Nikolaevich (2010). ""Our Ambitious Plans": Soviet Shipbuilding Programs of the Post-war Decades". Warship International. XLVII (3): 191–256. ISSN 0043-0374.
- Sokolov, Alexei Nikolaevich (2012). ""Our Ambitious Plans": Soviet Shipbuilding Programs of the Post-war Decades, Part III: 1981–1990 and 1986–1995". Warship International. XLIX (3): 245–269. ISSN 0043-0374.
- Sontag, Sherry; Drew, Christopher; Drew, Annette Lawrence (1998). Blind Man's Bluff: The Untold Story of American Submarine Espionage. Harper. ISBN 0-06-103004-X.
