= Beren (political party) =

Beren is a political party in Kyrgyzstan. The party was registered on December 30, 2006. The party is composed of former members of the Ar-Namys party, and advocates a parliamentary form of government.
