= Vasily Altfater =

Russian and Soviet admiral (1883–1919)

Vasili Altfater
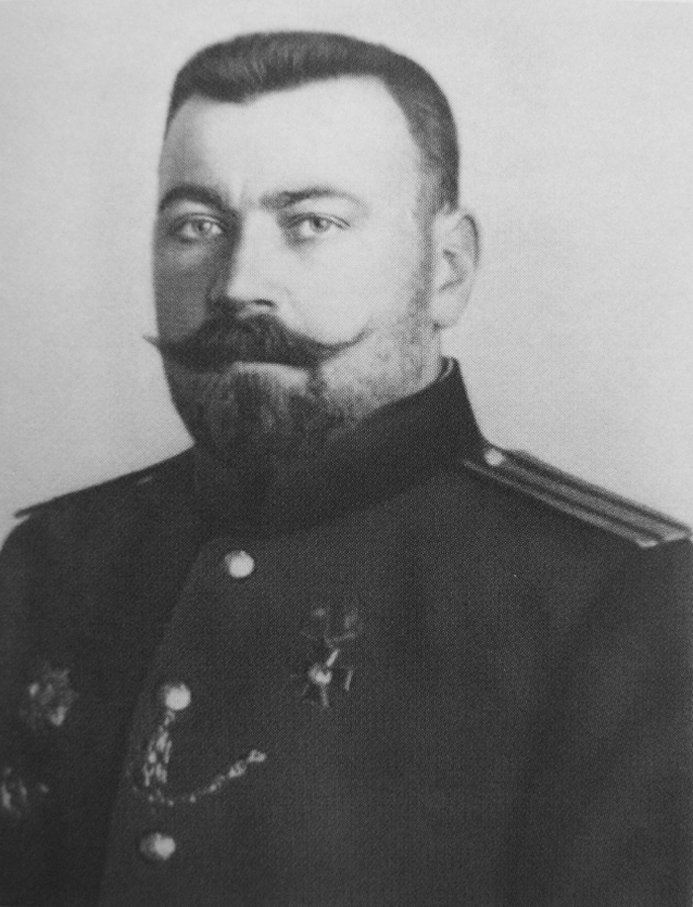
- Native name: Василий Михайлович Альтфатер
- Born: 16 December 1883; Warsaw, Kingdom of Poland, Russian Empire
- Died: 20 April 1919 (aged 35) Moscow, Russian SFSR
- Allegiance: Russian Empire; Russian Soviet Federative Socialist Republic
- Branch: Imperial Russian Navy; Soviet Navy
- Service years: 1902–1918
- Rank: Rear Admiral
- Commands: Soviet Navy
- Conflicts: World War I Russian Civil War

Vasili Mikhailovich Altfater (Russian: Васи́лий Миха́йлович Альтфа́тер; 16 December 1883 – 20 April 1919) was a Russian-Soviet naval officer, the first Commander-in-chief of the Soviet Navy.

== Early life and education ==
Altfater was born in Warsaw the son of an artillery officer, General Mikhail Altfater who was from a noble Baltic German Family.

Altfater graduated from Marine Cadet Corps (1902) and Naval Academy's Department of Hydrography (1908).

== Naval career ==
During the Russo-Japanese War, Altfater participated in the defense of Port Arthur (Lüshunkou) and rescue of the crew of the battleship Petropavlovsk. Later on, Altfater served as the squadron navigating officer of the 1st destroyer division of the Baltic Fleet (1909–1910). During World War I, as Captain 2nd Rank Altfater was one of two liaison officers for the Imperial Russian Navy at the Tsar's Supreme Headquarters (the Stavka), where he had responsibility for advising on command appointments in the Baltic Fleet. He was later head of the Military Administration under the Commander-in-chief of the Northern Fleet. In October 1917, Altfater was promoted to the rank of Rear-Admiral.

After the October Revolution, he joined the Soviets. In February 1918, Altfater was appointed assistant to the head of the Naval Headquarters. He participated in peace negotiations in Brest-Litovsk as a naval technical adviser to the Soviet delegation. In April, Altfater became a board member at the People's Commissariat of Naval Affairs. In October, he became a member of the Revolutionary Military Council (Реввоенсовет, Revvoyensovet) and appointed Commander-in-chief of the Soviet Naval Forces.

Altfater died of a heart attack in Moscow on 20 April 1919. On receiving the news about his death, Leon Trotsky said that "the Red Fleet lost a tireless, competent, energetic and honest worker". He is buried in the Novodevichy Cemetery, Moscow.
