= Bruce Beran =

American vice admiral

A. Bruce Beran
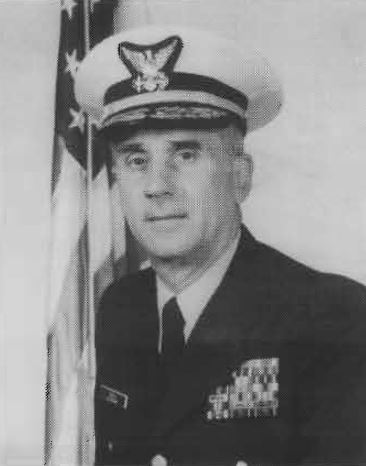
- Born: August 8, 1935 (age 90)
- Allegiance: United States of America
- Branch: United States Coast Guard
- Service years: 1955–1990s
- Rank: Vice admiral

Arnold Bruce Beran (born August 8, 1935) is a retired United States Coast Guard vice admiral. He served as Commander of the Coast Guard Pacific Area, Chief of Staff of the United States Coast Guard and Commanding Officer of the U.S. Coast Guard Headquarters.
