= Mikhail Berens =

Imperial Russian Navy admiral (1879–1943)

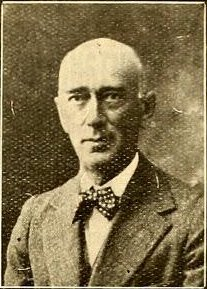
- Born: January 16, 1879; Kutaisi, Georgia, Russian Empire
- Died: January 20, 1943 (aged 64); Tunis, French Tunisia
- Relatives: Yevgeniy Berens (brother)
- Military career
- Allegiance: Russian Empire; White Movement
- Branch: Imperial Russian Navy
- Service years: 1895–1924
- Rank: Rear Admiral
- Commands: Wrangel's fleet
- Conflicts: Boxer Rebellion; Russo Japanese War; World War I Russian Civil War
- Awards: Order of St. Stanislav; Order of St. George; Legion of Honour; Order of St. Anne

Mikhail Andreyevich Berens (Russian: Михаил Андреевич Беренс; January 16, 1879 – January 20, 1943) was an officer in the Imperial Russian Navy and the White Navy during the Russian Civil War.

== Biography ==
Mikhail Berens was born in Kutaisi, Georgia, and graduated from the Naval Cadet Corps in 1898. He commanded the gunboat Gilyak in the Imperial Russian Navy where he distinguished himself during the suppression of Taku Forts during the Boxer Rebellion. He was promoted to captain in 1904 and stationed with the Russian Pacific Fleet at Port Arthur

During the Russo-Japanese War, as a junior officer, he served as navigator on the battleship Sevastopol, and was captain of the destroyer Boyki after the Battle of the Yellow Sea. After the Russian defeat, Berens escaped with his ship to Qingdao and was interned for the remainder of the war. In 1906 he joined the Baltic Fleet and was the executive officer of the cruiser Diana and subsequently commanded the destroyer Novik during World War I. On August 18, 1915, he engaged two German destroyers in the Gulf of Riga, sinking one and inflicting heavy damage on the other. For this action, he was awarded the Order of St. George from Russia and the Legion of Honour from France.

In 1916, he was promoted to captain of the battleship Petropavlovsk and became chief of staff of the Russian Baltic Fleet in 1917. Following the Russian Revolution, the Russian Provisional Government dismissed him in 1918 without pension.

He escaped from in March 1919 Petrograd via Finland and joined Admiral Kolchak, who gave him the rank of rear admiral and assigned him command the White Movement naval forces at Vladivostok. On 31 January 1920, he took his remaining vessels and numerous refugees to Tsuruga in Japan. In August 1920 he arrived at Sevastopol in the Crimea and joined General Wrangel's Armed Forces of South Russia. He was assigned command of the fortress of Kerch in September 1920, patrolling the Sea of Azov and the Black Sea. With the collapse of the White Movement, he evacuated his forces with Wrangel's fleet to Bizerte in French Tunisia. He commanded the Russian fleet in exile from January 1921 until its disarmament, after the recognition by France of the Soviet Union on October 29, 1924.

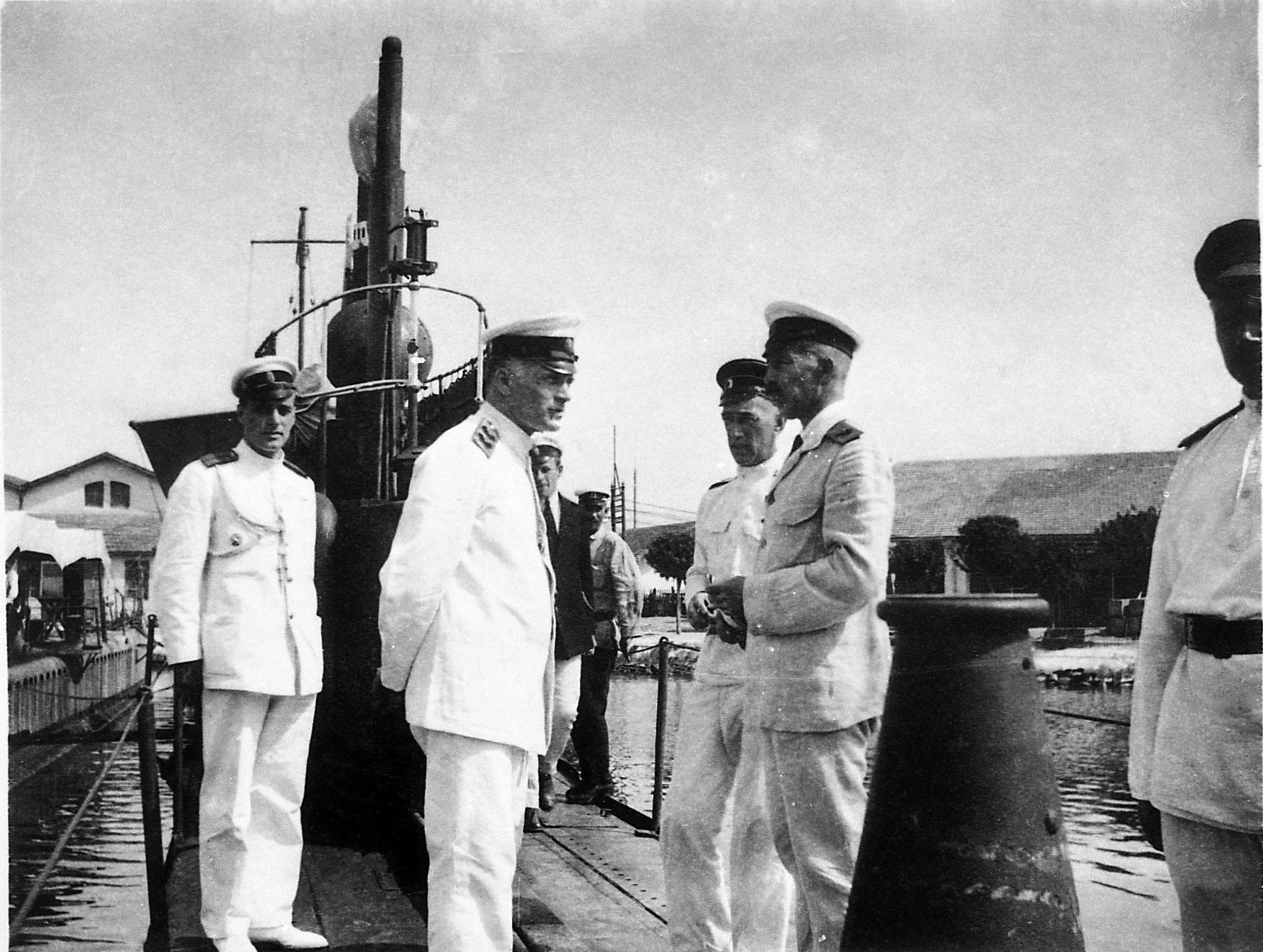
Admiral Berens (third from left) at Bizerte, 1921.

Remaining in Tunis, he worked in the agricultural sector and participated actively in the affairs of the local Department of Navy Union. He died in Tunis in 1943 and was buried at the cemetery in Megrin. His ashes were transferred to the Borzhel cemetery in Tunisia on April 30, 2001.

Mikhail's brother Yevgeniy Berens joined the Bolshevik cause during the Russian Civil War and became commander in the Soviet Navy.

== Awards ==
- Order of St. Stanislav, Grade 3, with swords and bow
- Order of St. George, Grade 4
- Order of St. Anne, Grade 2
- Gold Sword for Bravery
- Legion of Honour (France)
