= Hanne Behrens =

Danish goldsmith and master of textile techniques

Hanne Behrens (born 1950) is a Danish goldsmith and master of textile techniques, who specializes in weaving precious metals. Her work has won numerous international awards.

== Early life and education ==
Hanne Behrens was born in 1950 in Denmark.

Her teachers were Arline Fisch and Mary Lee Hu.

- 1968–72 Apprenticed as goldsmith in Tønder, Denmark
- 1973 Studied at Fachhochschule, Schwäbisch-Gmünd, Germany
- 1975–77 Goldsmith's High School, Copenhagen, Denmark
- 1978 Studied at San Diego State University, Art (under Arline M. Fisch) California
- 1997 Studied at University of Washington, Art (under Mary Lee Hu), Washington

== Practice and career ==
Behrens has developed her own techniques and distinct visual style. She works primarily in high Karat golds and silver. She frequently incorporates found objects such as shells into her weavings.

She is a master of textile techniques who specializes in weaving precious metals. Her work is known for its intricate weaving paired with clean lines and shapes.

== Awards ==
- 1977 Handelsbanken's travel grant
- 1979 Bronze Medal, Danish Craftsman-designer Prize of 1879.
- 1980 Silver Medal, Danish Craft-designer Prize of 1879.
- 1982 The design competition of the goldsmith profession: Two medals.
- 1986 The States Fund for the endowment of fine arts, working scholarship.
- 1988 K. A. Larsen og Hustrus Grant.
- 1988 Højskolernes Håndarbejde Fund.
- 1992 Denmark's Nationalbank's Jubilæumsfond of 1968.
- 1992 Thrige's Fund.
- 1992 The States Fund for the endowment of fine arts, working scholarship.
- 1996 The States Fund for endowment of fine arts, Travel grants.
- 1996 Design Fund, Travel grants.
- 1996 Dalhoff Larsen's Fund, Travel grants.
- 1998 The States Fund for endowment of fine arts, working scholarship.
- 1998 Gold Medal, VIII Biennale Internazionale del Merletto, Sansepolcro, Italy.
- 1999 Denmark's Nationalbanks Jubilæumsfond of 1968, Travel grants.
- 1999 Place 9 in Internationaler Bernstein - Kunsthandwerkerpreis der Ostsee, Ribnitz-Damgarten, Tyskland.
- 2000 Commissioned to make a brooch as a gift to Margrethe II of Denmark on her 60th birthday
- 2001 Dalhoff Larsen's Fund, Travel grants.
- 2003 Denmark's Nationalbanks Jubilæumsfond of 1968, Travel grants.
- 2004 The States Fund for the endowment of fine art, Travel grants (Santa Fe Symposium NM, Solo show at Mobilia Gallery, Cambridge MA and SOFA New York), United States.

== Exhibitions ==
Curated exhibitions:

- 1978 "The Silver Guild" New York City, NY, United States.
- 1983 Kunstnernes sommerudstilling, Tistrup.
- 1984, 1986 Charlottenborgs Forårsudstilling, Copenhagen.
- 1994 "VI Biennale Internazionale del Merletto", Sansepolcro, Italy.
- 1995 "Biennalen" Kunstindustrimuseet, Copenhagen, Denmark.
- 1996 "VII Biennale Internazionale del Merletto", Sansepolcro, Italy.
- 1998 "VIII Biennale Internazionale del Merletto", Sansepolcro, Italy (Gold medal).
- 2000 "Euro-Fire in the Land of Liège" Liège, Belgium.
- 2000 "IX Biennale International del Merletto" Sansepolcro, Italy.
- 2001 "Jewellery" International Craft Exhibition, Itami, Japan and Osaka Municipal Craft Park, Osaka, Japan.
- 2002 X Biennale Internazionale Del Merletto, Sansepolcro, Italy.
- 2002 Jewelry from painting Mobilia, Cambridge MA, United States.

Solo exhibitions:

- 1992 Tønder Museum, Tønder, Denmark.
- 1992 Galleri 2 RN, Åkirkeby, Denmark.
- 1993 Gallerie Art So-To, Aalborg, Denmark.
- 1999 Dowse Artmuseum, Upper Hutt, Wellington, New Zealand.
- 2000 Galleri 2 RN, Åkirkeby, Denmark.
- 2003 Aalborg Kunstpavillon, Aalborg, Denmark.
- 2004 Mobilia Gallery, Cambridge, MA, United States.
- 2005 "Spitzen Stücke", Museum für Kunst und Kulturgeschichte, Dortmund, Germany.
- 2007 Metal / Tekstilt – Hanne Behrens – 30 years' play with wire. Museum Søndejylland, Tønder, Denmark.
- 2008 Mobilia Gallery, Cambridge, MA, United States.
- 2010 Galerie Beeld & Aambeeld, Enschede, Netherlands.
- 2010 Galleri New Form, Trelleborg, Sweden.
- 2010 Mobilia Gallery, Cambridge, MA, United States.

Group exhibitions:

- 1995 "School of Fisch", Nordjyllands Kunstmuseum, Aalborg, Denmark / DesignYard, Dublin, Ireland / Craft and Folk Art Museum, Los Angeles, United States.
- 1995 "Forms in Progression" The Danish Institute in Athens, Greece.
- 1996 "Textile Techniques in Metal" Mobilia Gallery, Cambridge, MA, United States.
- 1996 "Hollyday with Arline Fisch" Gallery Eight, La Jolla, CA, United States.
- 1996 "Den Danske Broche" Marienlyst Slot, Helsingør, Denmark.
- 1996 "Eksperimenter i smykker" Center for Dansk Kunsthåndværk, Herning, Denmark.
- 1996 "Kunsthandwerk aus Schleswig-Holstein und Dänemark" Schleswig-Holsteins
- Repræsentation in Bonn, Germany.
- 1997 "The Teapot Redefined" Mobilia Gallery, Cambridge, United States.
- 1998 "Forms in Progression" Skovgaard Museet, Viborg, Denmark.
- 1998 "Souvenir - Out of Denmark" DesignYard, Dublin, Ireland.
- 1998 "Artifacts and Archetypes" Mobilaia Gallery, Cambridge, MA, United States.
- 1998 "Kunsthandwerk aus Schleswig-Holstein und Dänemark" Wenzel-Halblik-Museum, Itzehoe, Germany..
- 1999 "Vrå-Udstillingen 99" guest, Vrå, Denmark.
- 1999 "Kunsthandwerk aus Schleswig-Holstein und Dänemark". Dithmarscher Landesmuseum, Meldorf, Germany.
- 2000 "Amber, finery and use" Ravmuseet, Oksbøl, Denmark.
- 2000 "Kunsthandwerk aus Schleswig-Holstein und Dänemark" Ostholstein-Museum, Eutin, Germany.
- 2001 "The Ring" Mobilia Gallery, Cambridge, MA, United States.
- 2001 "Braid" Nordjyllands Kunstmuseum, Aalborg and Tønder Museum, Denmark.
- 2002 SOFA Chicago, United States.
- 2002 SOFA New York, United States.
- 2002 "Textile Techniques in Metal" Mobilia Gallery, Cambridge, MA, United States.
- 2003 "The Ring" Ruthin Gallery, Ruthin, Wales, United Kingdom.
- 2003 SOFA New York, United States.
- 2003 "Earrings" Mobilia Gallery, Cambridge, MA, United States..
- 2003 "Smykker i lys" Århus Kunstbygning, Århus, Denmark.
- 2003 SOFA Chicago, United States.
- 2004 SOFA New York and SOFA Chicago, United States
- 2004 "Blue" Mobilia Gallery, Cambridge, MA, United States.
- 2005 SOFA, New York and Chicago, Mobilia Gallery, United States.
- 2005 "Amber, finery and use", Ravmuseet Oksbøl.
- 2005 "Necklace", Mobilia Gallery, Cambridge, MA, United States.
- 2006 SOFA, New York and Chicago, Mobilia Gallery, United States.
- 2007 SOFA, New York, Mobilia Gallery, United States.
- 2007 "Vrå-udstillingen 07" Vrå, Denmark.
- 2007 "Form, farve og fællesskab" Dronninglund Kunstcenter, Denmark.
- 2007 ”Design Collection Winther 2007" Roger Bilcliffe Gallery, Glasgow, Scotland.
- 2008 SOFA, New York, Mobilia Gallery, United States.
- 2008 YUFUKU Gallery, Tokyo, Japan.
- 2008 "Remember-ring" Galerie Beeld & Aambeeld, Enschede, Holland.
- 2009 SOFA, New York, Mobilia Gallery, United States.
- 2009 "Remember-ring" National Craft Gallery, Kilkenny, Ireland.
- Galerie Cebra, Düsseldorf, Germany.
- "Smycke-atelje", Lindköbing, Sweden.
- Gallery Expo-Arte, Norway.
- 2009 "Vraa-udstillingen", Kunstbygningen, Vraa, Denmark.
- 2009 "Textile Arts 2009" Mobilia Gallery, Cambridge, MA, United States.
- 2010 "Vraa-udstillingen", Kunstbygningen, Vraa, Denmark.
- 2010 East meet West, Yufuku Gallery, Tokyo, Japan.
- 2010 Du textile au bijou, Pôle Bijou galerie, Baccart, France.
- 2011 Biennalen for Kunsthåndværk og Design 2011, Museet på Koldinghus
- 2011 Rav-museet i Kaliningrad, Russland, Norway.
- 2011 Knipling udstilling, Putin Museet, Moskva, Russland, Norway.
- 2011 "Vraa-udstillingen", Kunstbygningen, Vraa, Denmark.

== Collections ==
- 1985 The States Fund for endowment of fine arts, Denmark.
- 1988 The Art Fund of 14 August, Copenhagen, Denmark.
- 1989 Vendsyssel Art Museum, Hjoerring, Denmark.
- 1992 The States Fund for endowment of fine arts, Denmark.
- 1992 The Art Fund of 14. August, Copenhagen, Denmark.
- 1993 The Art Fund of 14. August, Copenhagen, Denmark.
- 1996 Schleswig-Holsteins Landesmuseum, Gottorf Castel, Germany.
- 1998 The Art Fund of 14. August, Copenhagen, Denmark.
- 2000 Ravmuseet i Oksbøl (Ambermuseum), Denmark.
- 2003 Koch's Ring Collection, Switzerland.
- 2004 The Sparta Teapot Museum, NC, United States.
- 2005 Ravmuseet i Oksbøl (Ambermuseum), Denmark.
- 2005 Museum Für Kunst und Kulturgeschichte, Dortmund, Germany.
- 2007 Museum Soendejylland, Toender, Denmark.
- 2008 New Carlsberg Fund, Denmark.

Official works

- 2000 Nordjyllands Amts gift to H.M. Queen Margrethe II of Denmark, 60th birthday (lace brooch).
- 2000 Løgstør Kommunes gift to H.M. Queen Margrethe II of Denmark, 100 years City birthday (brooch and earclips in gold and amber).

== Publications ==
- Kraks Blå Bog.
- 1996 Textile Techniques in Metal, Arline M. Fisch, ISBN 0-937274-933.
- 2000 Jewelry Design The artisan's Reference, Elizabeth Olver ISBN 1-58180-094-0.
- 2001 Dansk smykkekunst, Lise Funder, ISBN 87-17-06996-3.
- 2001 Textile Techniques in Metal. Arline M. Fisch. ISBN 1-57990-256-1
- 2006 Crocheted wire jewelry, Arline M. Fisch
