= Beren (given name) =

- Gender: unisex

Origin
- Meaning: "strong, clever, well-known".
- Region of origin: Turkey

Beren is a Turkish female given name meaning "strong, clever, well-known".

== People ==
Notable people with this name include:

- Beren Gökyıldız (born 2009), Turkish actress
- Beren Saat (born 1984), Turkish actress
- Beren Yeşilırmak (born 2005), Turkish volleyball player
