= Yevgeny Berens =

Russian admiral (1876–1928)

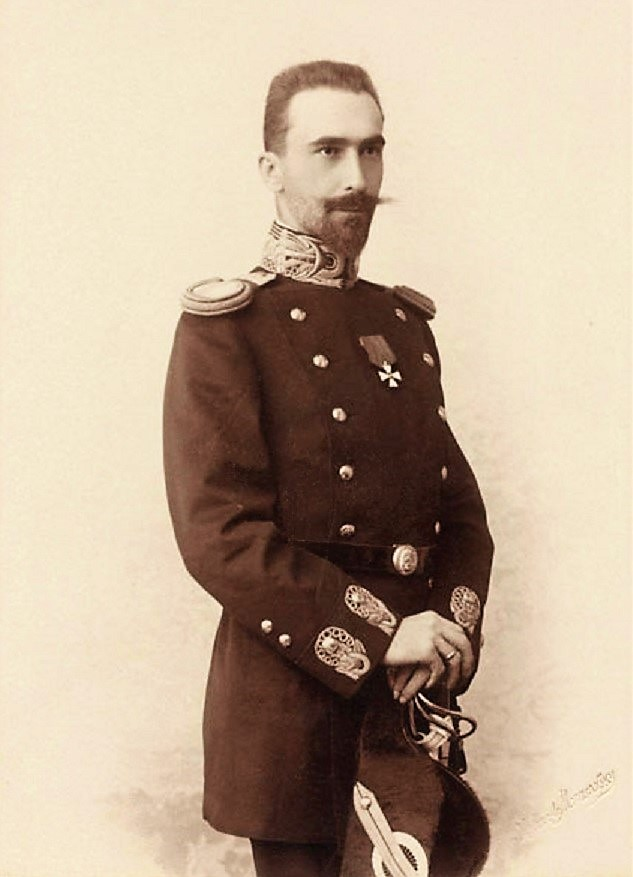
- Born: 11 November 1876; Tbilisi, Tiflis Governorate, Russia
- Died: 7 March 1928 (aged 51); Moscow, Moscow Governorate, Soviet Union
- Relatives: Mikhail Berens (brother)
- Military career
- Allegiance: Russian Empire; Soviet Union
- Branch: Imperial Russian Navy; Soviet Navy
- Service years: 1895–1928
- Rank: Vice Admiral
- Commands: Soviet Navy
- Conflicts: Russo Japanese War; World War I Russian Civil War

Yevgeny Andreyevich Berens (Russian: Евгений Андреевич Беренс, occasionally transliterated as Behrens; 11 November [O.S. 30 October] 1876 – 7 April 1928) was a Russian military leader, Commander-in-Chief of the Soviet Naval Forces from April 1919 to February 1920.

Born in Tiflis in 1876, Berens graduated from the Naval Cadet Corps in 1895. He was navigating officer of the Russian cruiser Varyag and fought in the Battle of Chemulpo Bay when his ship was sunk. After being repatriated he served in the Baltic Fleet as executive officer of the Russian battleship Tsesarevich. From 1910 to 1917 he served as naval attaché to the Netherlands, Germany, and Italy (1915–1917). After the February Revolution, Berens returned to Russia and served on the Naval General Staff.

After the October Revolution he joined the Red side and was head of the Naval Staff from 1917 to 1919. Following the death of Vasili Altfater, he served as commander of the Red Navy from 24 April 1919.

In 1920, he was transferred to the diplomatic service and was head of the Soviet delegation at major conferences. He was military attaché to Great Britain and France from 1924. He died in Moscow in 1928 and was buried in Novodevichy Cemetery.

Berens' brother, Mikhail Berens, was also a naval officer but joined the white side in the Russian Civil War and commanded Wrangel's fleet.
