= Kommunarka shooting ground =

Execution venue and burial ground in Moscow Oblast

Coordinates: 55°34′45″N 37°27′21″E

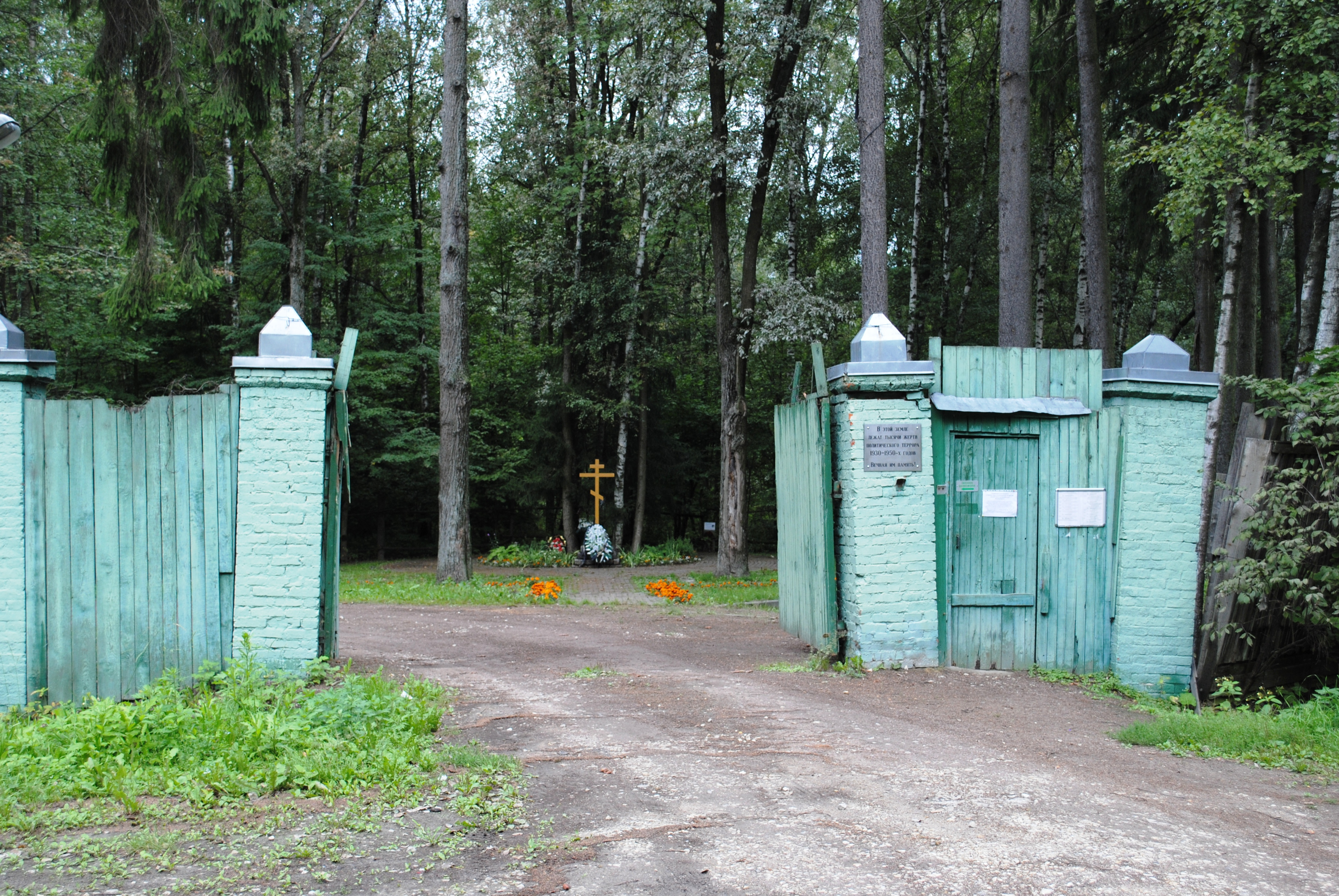
Entrance gate into the Kommunarka shooting ground in 2012

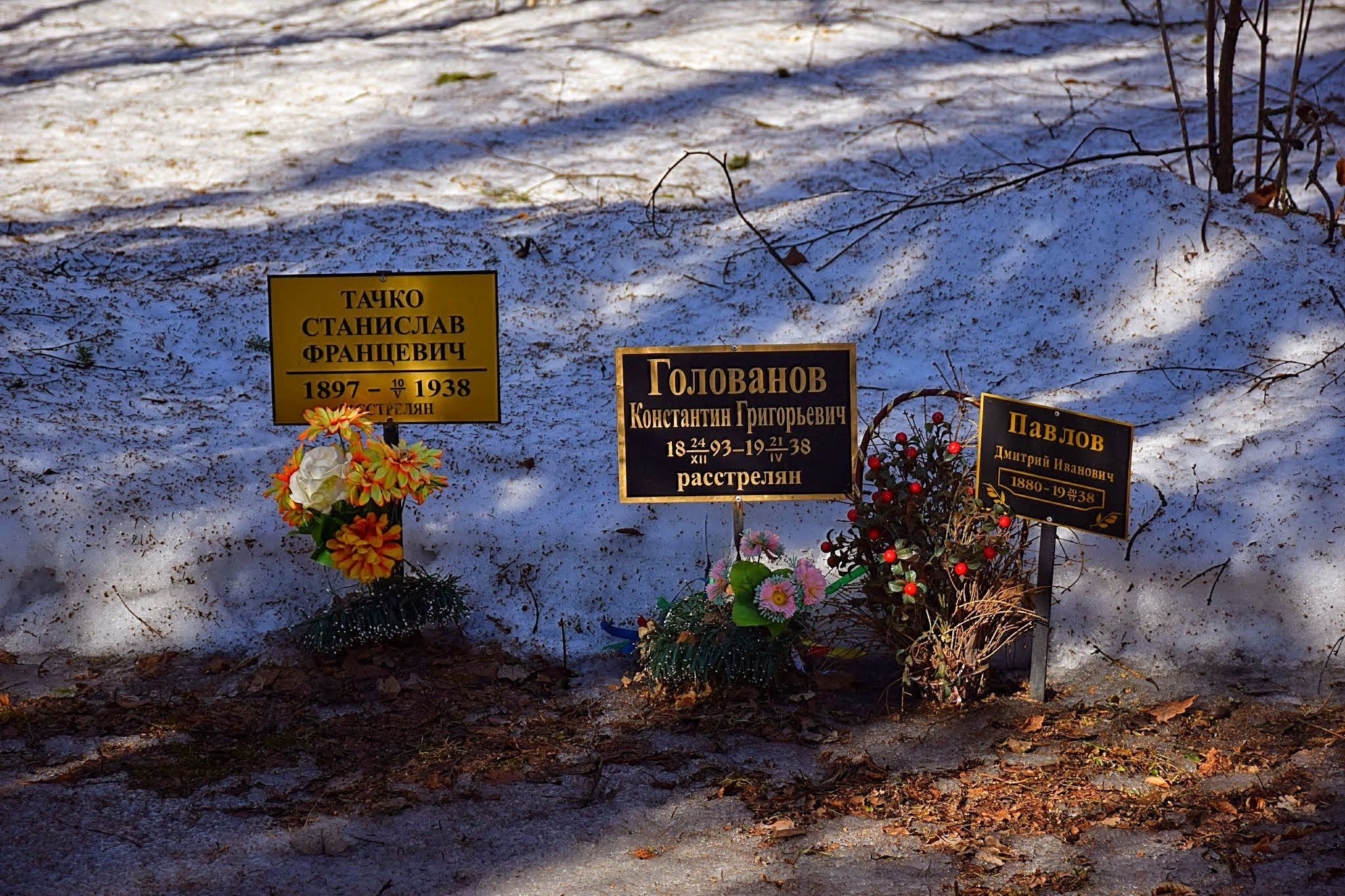
Grave markers for some of the victims at Kommunarka

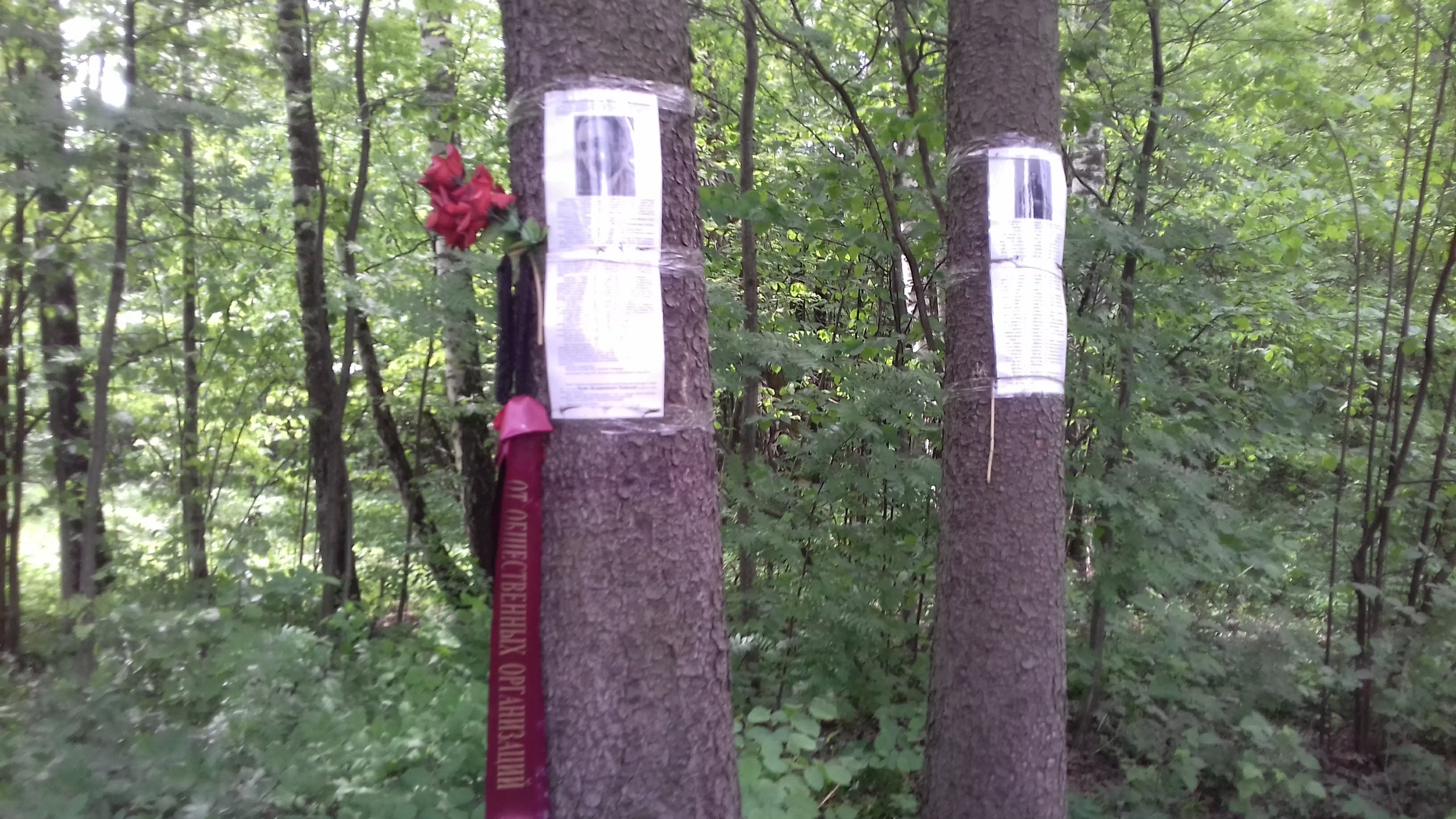
Photos of some of the victims

The Kommunarka shooting site, often mistakenly called Kommunarka firing range (Russian: Расстрельный полигон «Коммунарка»)—the former dacha of secret police chief Genrikh Yagoda—was used as an execution site and mass grave from 1937 to 1941. Executions of those who were sentenced to death, mainly by Military Collegium of the Supreme Court of the Soviet Union, were performed there by the NKVD during the Great Terror and until 1941. It is also possible that the bodies of people shot elsewhere might have been brought there for burial. As Russian historian Arseny Roginsky explained: "firing range" was a popular euphemism adopted to describe mysterious and closely-guarded plots of land that the NKVD began to set aside for mass burials on the eve of the Great Terror.

== Identifying the victims ==
Talking to Izvestiya in 2007, a representative of the Federal Security Service suggested that approximately 10,000 people had been killed and buried in mass graves at Kommunarka. Painstaking work by Memorial researchers and others in the 1990s established the identity of 4,527 known to be buried there. Their names were published in Memorial's first Book of Remembrance. Before Kommunarka opened as a memorial complex in 2018 an archaeological survey indicated that 6,600 bodies probably lay there, the total number of names since reached through further documentary research.

As with so many other "firing ranges" throughout the former Soviet Union, the FSB (successor to the KGB and the NKVD) retained control of the territory for many decades thereafter. Only in 1999 was the land transferred, as with the Butovo firing range south of Moscow, to the Russian Orthodox Church. Only on 14 November 1999 did a plaque commemorating the Victims of Political Repression at the "special installation" finally appear, later than at any other mass burial site in Moscow, comments Arseny Roginsky. The Church of Russia's New Martyrs and Confessors of the Faith, dedicated to those who had died for their Christian faith during the Soviet period, was built at Kommunarka, and their feast day was thereafter celebrated each year on or around 25 January.

== Opening and controversy ==
On 27 October 2018 when the memorial site opened all 6,609 names of those known to be buried there were included on the Wall of Remembrance. A controversy then arose over the inclusion on the lists of some 50 high-ranking secret police officers (including Yagoda himself) none of whom had been rehabilitated.

The decision to use a single list was explained by Memorial chairman Jan Raczynski, one of those who had taken part in discussions of the form the memorial complex should take: other partners in the project were the Gulag History Museum, representatives of the buried victims, the Moscow city commission for the Victims of Political Repression and the Russian Orthodox Church. The committee concluded, said Raczynski, that everyone deserved a grave to which relatives and descendants might come. That included all those who had been buried at Kommunarka, but in no sense did it exonerate them of any earlier crimes.

== Notable victims ==
- Yakov Agranov
- Tobias Akselrod
- Yakov Alksnis
- Anandyn Amar
- Vasily Anisimoff
- Nikolay Antipov
- Vladimir Antonov-Ovseyenko
- Juris Aploks
- Ernest Appoga
- Artur Artuzov
- Ölziin Badrakh
- Žanis Bahs
- Mikhail Batorsky
- Alexander Bekzadyan
- Abram Belenky
- Alexander Beloborodov
- Boris Berman
- Matvei Berman
- Eduard Berzin
- Reingold Berzin
- Yan Karlovich Berzin
- Anastasia Bitsenko
- Waclaw Bogucki
- Mykhailo Bondarenko
- Mieczysław Broński
- Pyotr Bryanskikh
- Andrei Bubnov
- Nikolai Bukharin
- Pavel Bulanov
- Dadash Bunyadzade
- Hayk Bzhishkyan
- Hugo Celmiņš
- Mikhail Chernov
- Sergey Chernykh
- Jūlijs Daniševskis
- Yakov Davydov
- Terenty Deribas
- Dansranbilegiin Dogsom
- Pavel Dybenko
- Robert Eikhe
- Ivan Fedko
- Peter Maximovich Feldman
- Filip Filipović
- Rashid Khan Gaplanov
- Ilya Garkavyi
- Aleksei Gastev
- Anatoliy Gekker
- Nikolai Gikalo
- Vladimir Gittis
- Vasily Pavlovich Glagolev
- Konstantin Grigorovich
- Edvard Gylling
- Hryhoriy Hrynko
- Akmal Ikramov
- Chingiz Ildyrym
- Uraz Isayev
- Vladimir Ivanov
- Bruno Jasieński
- Semyon Kamenev
- Grigory Kaminsky
- Georgii Karpechenko
- Innokenty Khalepsky
- Fayzulla Khodzhayev
- Vasiliy Khripin
- Grigory Kireyev
- Vladimir Kirshon
- Vladimir Klimovskikh
- Nikolai Klestov
- Vilhelm Knorin
- Lazar Kogan
- Nikolai Kondratiev
- August Kork
- Ivan Kosogov
- Yepifan Kovtyukh
- Nikolay Krestinsky
- Nikolai Krylenko
- Pyotr Kryuchkov
- Béla Kun
- Vladimir Lazarevich
- Eduard Lepin
- Izrail Leplevsky
- Mikhail Levandovsky
- Lev Levin
- Ivan Lorents
- Darizavyn Losol
- Dorjjavyn Luvsansharav
- Maksim Mager
- Theodore Maly
- Mykola Marchak
- Joseph Meerzon
- Shmarya Medalia
- Valery Mezhlauk
- Stanislav Messing
- Romuald Muklevich
- Georgii Nadson
- Jamshid Nakhchivanski
- Stepan Oborin
- Valerian Osinsky
- Eduard Pantserzhanskiy
- Karl Pauker
- Dmitry Pavlov
- Jēkabs Peterss
- Osip Piatnitsky
- Boris Pilnyak
- Yevgeny Polivanov
- Yakov Popok
- Bronislava Poskrebysheva
- Nikolay Rattel
- Arkady Rosengolts
- Kustaa Rovio
- Jānis Rudzutaks
- Alexei Rykov
- Turar Ryskulov
- Andrei Sazontov
- Vasily Schmidt
- Alexander Sedyakin
- Alexander Serebrovsky
- Suren Shadunts
- Vasily Sharangovich
- Zolbingiin Shijee
- Boris Shumyatsky
- Jan Spielrein
- Sergey Spigelglas
- Mikhail Svetšnikov
- Pavel Sytin
- Alexander Svechin
- Branislaw Tarashkyevich
- Alexander Tarasov-Rodionov
- Mikhail Trilisser
- Jozef Unszlicht
- Maksim Unt
- Semyon Uritsky
- Aleksandr Uspensky
- Leonid Ustrugov
- Jukums Vācietis
- Fayzulla Xoʻjayev
- Yakov Yakovlev
- Yefim Yevdokimov
- Konstantin Yurenev
- Leonid Zakovsky
- Isaak Zelensky
- Nikolai Zhilyayev
- Prokopy Zubarev

Leading Bolsheviks convicted at the two later Moscow Show Trials were among the many prominent Party leaders buried at Kommunarka, particularly those publicly tried convicted at the so-called Trial of the Twenty-One in March 1938. Some defendants from the January 1937 Trial of the Seventeen, such as Beloborodov and Bubnov who were charged but did not appear in court, were also buried at Kommunarka. Most of the other defendants in the Trial of the Twenty One are buried there: Bukharin, Rykov, Krestinsky, Rosengolts, Vladimir Ivanov, Mikhail Chernov, and Isaak Zelensky, Uzbek leaders Akmal Ikramov and Faizulla Khodjaev; Vasily Sharangovich, Prokopy Zubarev, and NKVD officer Pavel Bulanov, as well as Kremlin doctors Lev Levin and Ignaty Kazakov, Venyamin Maximov-Dikovsky, and Pyotr Kryuchkov, Maxim Gorky's secretary.

Also among burials are Mongolian revolutionaries Badrakh, Dogsom, Losol, Luvsanshara and Shijee, the writers Pilnyak, Kirshon, Jasienski, Red Army and NKVD officers Agranov, the Berman brothers, Berzin, Kogan, Pauker, and two Central Europeans: Bela Kun, who headed the short-lived 1919 Soviet republic in Hungary, and ex-priest Theodore Maly, who recruited Soviet agents abroad and in the mid-1930s.

== See also ==
- Butovo memorial complex, near Moscow
- Mass graves in the Soviet Union
- Memorial (society)
- Moscow Show Trials
- Sandarmokh memorial complex (Karelia)
