= German-Soviet air war 22 June 1941 =

One-day air battle during WWII

- Part of the aerial warfare during Operation Barbarossa
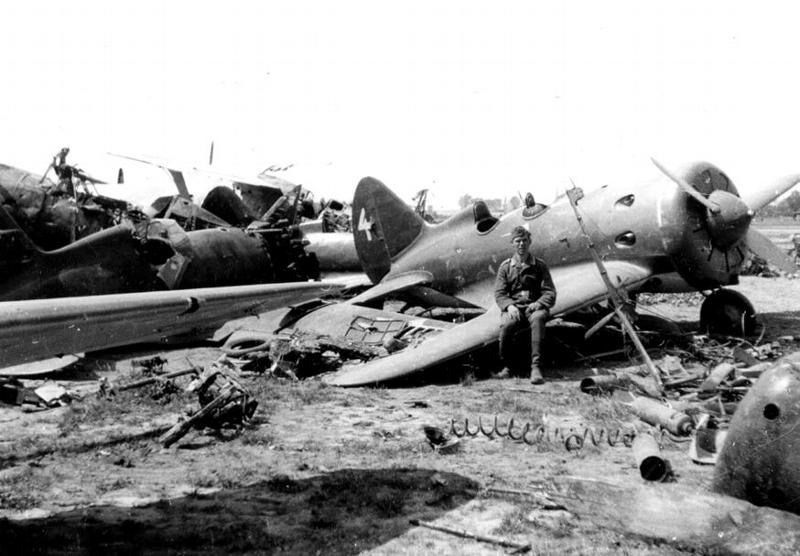
- Soviet aircraft from the 15th Fighter Regiment of the 8th Mixed Air Division, destroyed by Luftwaffe strikes, abandoned in the southern part of the Kaunas airfield, 22 June 1941.
Date	22 June 1941
Location	Soviet Union
Result	German victory

Belligerents
Soviet Union	Germany

Commanders and leaders
(Soviet Union) Pavel Zhigarev (Soviet Union) Aleksandr Novikov (Soviet Union) Fyodor Michugin (Soviet Union) Aleksey Ionov (Soviet Union) Boris Pogrebov (Soviet Union) Fyodor Polynin	(Nazi Germany) Hermann Göring (Nazi Germany) Hans Jeschonnek (Nazi Germany) Albert Kesselring (Nazi Germany) Alexander Löhr (Nazi Germany) Alfred Keller (Nazi Germany) Hans-Jürgen Stumpff (Nazi Germany) W. von Richthofen (Nazi Germany) Kurt Pflugbeil (Nazi Germany) Bruno Loerzer (Nazi Germany) Robert Ritter von Greim

Strength
Soviet Western Military Districts; Total: 10,451 combat aircraft including 5,460 single-engine fighters	Total: 3,297 combat aircraft including 975 single-engine fighters

Casualties and losses
22 June: >2,000 combat aircraft 22–24 June; Official Soviet data: 3,922 combat aircraft Independent researchers' estimates: unavailable	22 June; Official German combat losses: 35 aircraft Independent researchers' estimates: 55 or 57 aircraft 22–24 June; Official German data: 78 aircraft

The German-Soviet air war on 22 June 1941 was the largest one-day air battle in military history. The battle involved both aerial dogfights and airstrikes on Soviet airbases. Around 14,000 combat aircraft took part in the air war on 22 June 1941, with more 2,000 combat aircraft destroyed. The loss ratio was estimated at 35:1 to 60:1 in favor of the Luftwaffe.

The Germans won a convincing victory, demonstrated superiority in tactics, the skills of pilots and, having destroyed significant forces of outnumbered Soviet air forces, gained air supremacy. The defeat was seen as forcing the Soviets to request replacement lost aircraft from the western powers, resulting in the July 1941 Anglo-Soviet Agreement cementing the Soviet Union as an Allied Power, despite longstanding ideological differences and Soviet participation in the Invasion of Poland.

== Luftwaffe on 21 June ==
As of 21 June, the Luftwaffe had a total of 4,948 combat aircraft on all fronts. These included 1,454 single-engine fighters and fighter-bombers, 282 twin-engine fighters and fighter-bombers, 196 twin-engine fighter-bombers, 422 dive bombers, 1,503 twin-engine bombers, 25 four-engine bombers, 244 seaplanes, and 822 reconnaissance aircraft. At last readiness, as of 21 June 1941, approximately 3,567 combat aircraft (72%) were in combat readiness. This included 76% single-engine fighters and fighter-bombers, 72% twin-engine fighters and fighter-bombers, 72% night fighters, 71% dive bombers, and 66% two- and four-engine bombers.

Even at the beginning of Operation Barbarossa, significant Luftwaffe forces remained in the West. In total, the West had about 33% of all available combat aircraft (including in the Mediterranean theater). This force consisted of 31% of all single-engine fighters, 27% of twin-engine fighters and fighter-bombers, 100% of night fighters, 20% of dive bombers, 37% of twin-engine bombers, 100% of four-engine bombers.

== Soviet aviation on 21 June ==
James J. Schneider has argued that from 1929, Joseph Stalin set out to create a "warfare state" in the Soviet Union, as a country that was continuously preparing to fight a large-scale war.

The Soviets were confident that in the event of war with Germany they would win an easy victory by defeating the Luftwaffe.

"What I heard exceeded all expectations: such a well-conceived and carefully prepared strike did not produce the expected results. I still don't understand how this could have happened: the Bolsheviks met us almost at the border"- says the German air fleet chief of staff in the 1939 Soviet military novel "The First Strike (The Tale of a Future War)", published by the Soviet Military Publishing House. In the novel, a German attack on Soviet airfields is thwarted by the coordinated activity of all Soviet air defense services, especially air surveillance posts, which make possible the timely launch of fighters whose pilots, the “Stalinist falcons”, completely defeat the German pilots and force them to retreat. A book written in the spirit of Stalinist slogans “the Red Army will respond with a triple blow to the blow of the warmongers” or “the Red Army will wage the war offensively with the goal of destroying the enemy and achieving victory with little bloodshed” contributed to the emergence of arrogant boastfulness and overestimation of Soviet aviation capabilities.

At the end of the 1930s, everything in Soviet engine building was still noticeably behind Western standards. Many Soviet aircraft manufacturing enterprises used outdated technology and the work was slowed down by a low-power experimental production base and the poor technical equipment of Soviet scientific institutes. The USSR had to resort to purchases from Western countries, especially the USA, and achieve the release of some licensed components and aviation materials. Materials science lagged behind, and the production of much-needed aluminum did not meet the needs of industry. Therefore, most Soviet aircraft had a mixed design with an extensive use of wood. The radio industry had failed to provide aircraft with reliable and compact radios and other necessary equipment, such as navigation.

No fewer problems arose when solving those of staffing. Bureaucracy, inertia, and the desire primarily for quantitative indicators seriously harmed the strengthening of the air power of the Soviet Union. Excessive ideologization and great attention to the "class" factor when recruiting the Red Army Air Force (80–90% of future pilots were recruited from workers or peasants) also had a negative impact on the overall combat readiness.

A meeting of senior command staff dedicated to the use of branches of the Armed Forces in the upcoming war, which took place six months before the Nazi invasion, showed examples of the many contradictory opinions expressed by leadership. The speakers presented different, sometimes directly opposing views on the optimal structure of the Air Force, the degree of centralization of control, the effectiveness of raids on enemy airfields, etc. This caused alarm among the People's Commissar for Defense of the Soviet Union, Marshal Semyon Timoshenko, who said, summing up: "We have a lot of accumulated experience regarding the use of the Air Force in operations, but, as noted at the meeting, this experience has not yet been generalized and studied. Furthermore, - and this can be fraught with serious consequences - our Air Force leadership does not have a unified view on such issues as the formation and planning of operations, assessment enemy, methods of conducting air warfare and imposing one’s will on the enemy, choosing targets, etc."

A significant part of the Soviet pilots had rich combat experience due to the Soviet Air Force having recently experienced combat over Finland at Winter War and against the Empire of Japan in the East.

== Black day of Soviet aviation ==
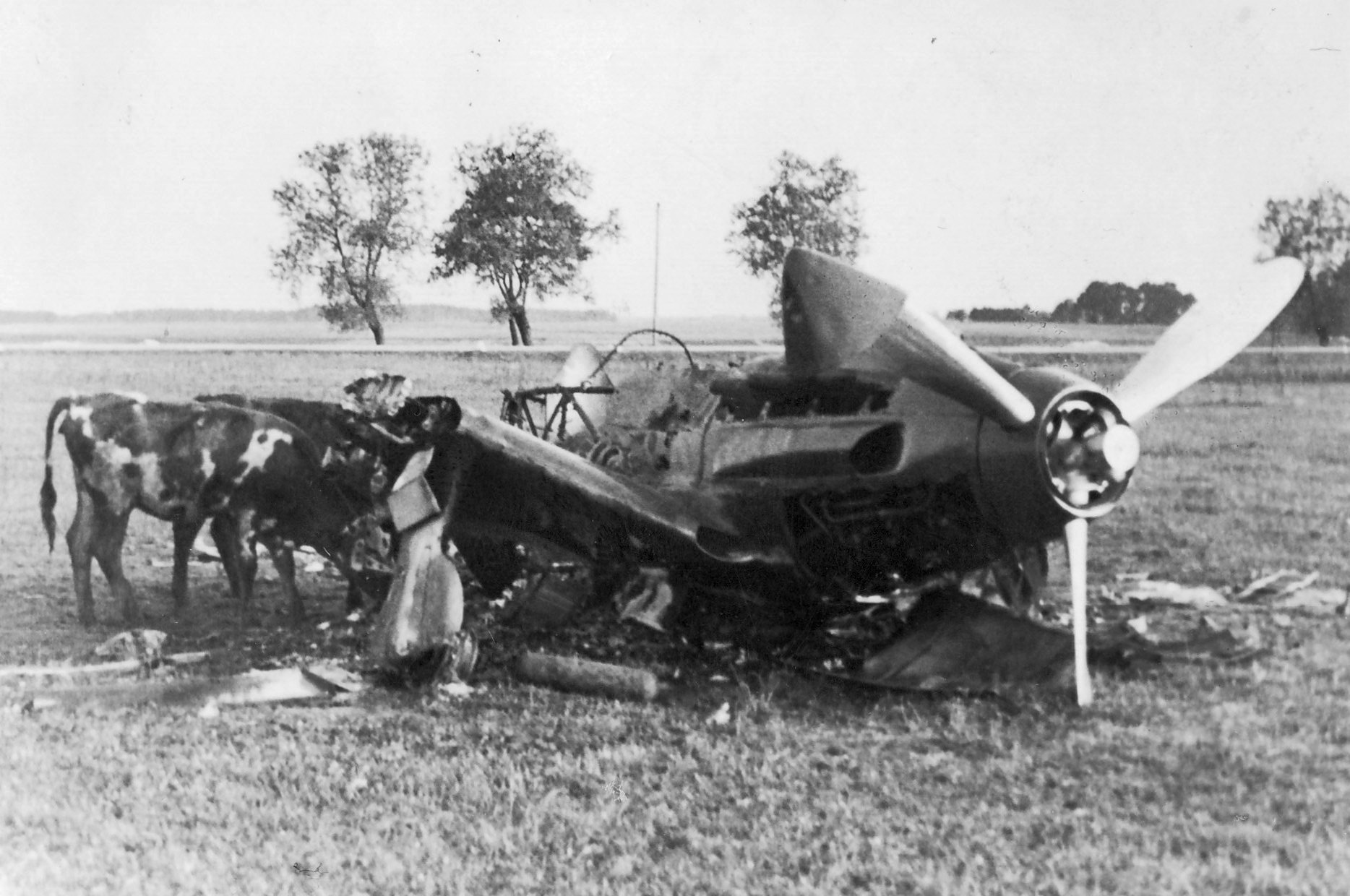
A destroyed MiG 3, during Barbarossa, 1941.

The Luftwaffe's Chief of the General Staff, Hans Jeschonnek, wanted to begin air attacks before the German artillery started firing. However, Hitler and the OKW decided that that might give the opportunity for the Soviets to disperse their air units, and rejected Jeschonnek's proposal. Hitler gave the order for the air strikes on airfields to be carried out at dawn. Although many new German bomber crews had only limited training in instrument-flying, the Luftflotten overcame the problem by hand picking experienced crews, who would cross the border at high altitude, to swoop on their targets. The Germans deliberately targeted Soviet fighter air bases first, to knock out potential opposition to its bombers and dive bombers.

The first attacks began at 03:00 on 22 June. The Soviets, caught by surprise, had their aircraft bunched together in neat rows which were vulnerable. The results proved devastating. At Pinsk aerodrome the 39th Mixed Bomber Aviation Regiment of 10th Mixed Aviation Division lost 43 SBs and five Pe-2s on the ground after attacks by KG 3, which lost one bomber. Further to the west, the 33rd Fighter Aviation Regiment of the 10th Mixed Aviation Division lost 46 I-53 and I-16s to fighter-bombers of JG 51. Messerschmitt Bf 110s of SKG 210 destroyed 50 aircraft at Kobryn airfield, near the headquarters of the 10th Mixed Aviation Division and the Soviet Fourth Army. The airfield based the 74th Attack Aviation Regiment, which lost 47 I-15s, 5 I-153s and 8 IL-2 aircraft on 22 June. Slightly later, KG 54 attacked airfields in the area, and its 80 Ju 88s destroyed 100 Soviet aircraft. The VVS flew 6,000 sorties (in comparison to the Germans' 2,272 sorties) and VVS ZOVO put 1,900 aircraft into the air. In several cases Soviet pilots rammed German machines, using the tactic of taran.

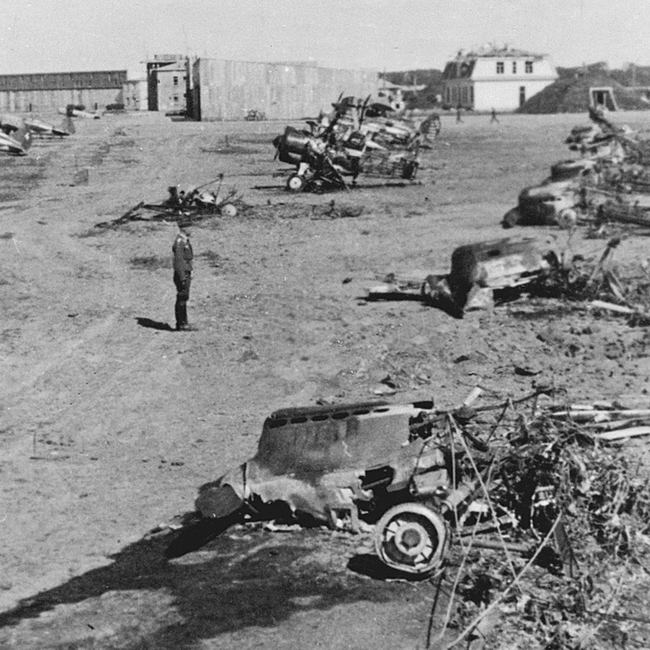
Soviet R-5 and I-15bis biplanes destroyed by Luftwaffe assault strikes at the Kaunas military airfield (USSR)

The Stavka, stunned by the initial assault, took several hours to realize the disastrous situation and to respond. They ordered every available VVS bomber into the air. Without coordination and fighter escort, they suffered catastrophic losses, and flew, quite literally, to the "last man". In the event, the VVS' bombers kept coming, and on several occasions the Bf 109s wiped out entire formations. Only 10 hours after the first Axis attacks, at 13:40, did the commander of the Red Army Air Force (VVS KA - Russian: ВВС КА - Военно-воздушные силы Красной Армии), Pavel Zhigarev, order the long-range aviation into action. The 96 Long-Range Aviation Regiment of 3rd Bomber Aviation Corps put 70 DB-3s into the air but lost 22 with many others returning damaged. The German fighter pilots had it very easy under these circumstances, attacking unescorted bombers in a target-rich environment. JG 53 claimed 74 air victories for two losses. III./JG 53 claimed 36 air victories alone and 28 on the ground. JG 51 was credited with 12 fighters and 57 bombers. JG 54 accounted for 45 air victories and 35 on the ground for one Bf 109 damaged. The Bf 110s of SKG 210 accounted for 334 Soviet aircraft against 14 airfields. It lost seven Bf 110s destroyed or damaged.

At the end of the day, German reports claimed 1,489 Soviet aircraft destroyed on the ground alone. At first, these statistics seemed barely credible. Even Hermann Göring refused to believe the figures and had them secretly checked. In fact, German officers checking the airfields which the Wehrmacht soon overran, counted over 2,000 wrecks. Soviet sources confirm these totals. The VVS Baltic District lost 56 aircraft on 11 airfields. VVS ZOVO lost 738 of its 1,789 aircraft on 26 airfields. The VVS Kiev District had 23 of its airfields bombed it lost 192 aircraft, 97 on the ground. In addition, 109 training aircraft were destroyed. The Long-Range Aviation and naval air forces reported the loss of 336 aircraft. Entire units were nearly wiped out. The 9th Mixed Aviation Division lost 347 out of 409 aircraft including the majority of the 57 MiG 3 and 52 I-16s of its 129th Fighter Aviation Regiment. The division's commander, Sergey Chernykh was shot for the failure. Only the VVS Odessa, under the command of Fyodor Michugin, was prepared for the assault, losing only 23 aircraft on six airbases to Emanoil Ionescu's Romanian Air Corps. Ionescu lost four per cent of his strength on this date, the worst Romanian losses on a single day in the 1941 campaign.

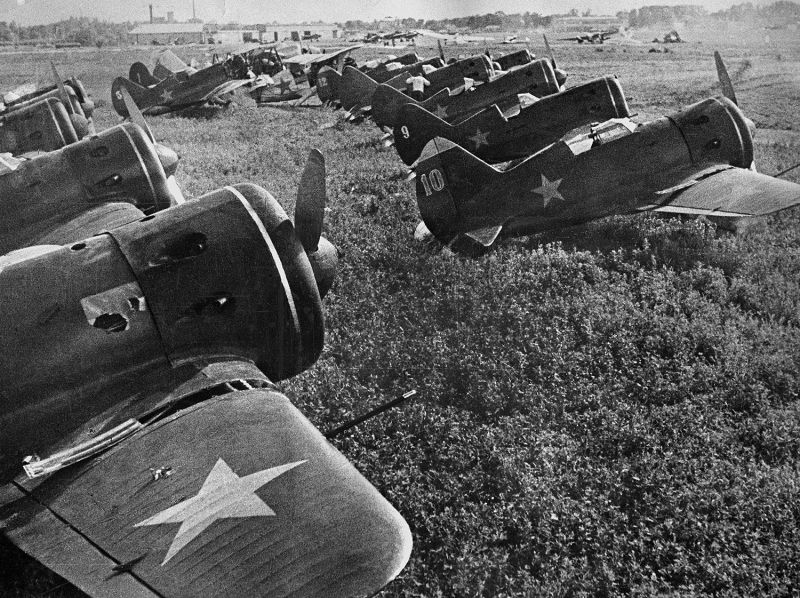
Soviet damaged I-16 fighters captured by the Germans at Riga airfield (USSR)

In all, two waves of Axis attacks struck. In the morning, the first wave destroyed 1,800 aircraft for two losses, while the second wave lost 33 Axis machines but destroyed 700 Soviet aircraft. The Soviet official history of the VVS only admits to "around" 1,200 losses. In the air battles, Axis losses were more significant. In some cases Luftwaffe losses, relevant to their strength were "shocking"; KG 51 lost 15 Ju 88s in one action. KG 55 lost 10 He 111s over the airfields. In contrast other bombers units suffered lightly. KG 27 claimed 40 Soviet aircraft on the ground, for no loss. Total Luftwaffe losses amounted to 55 combat aircraft on 22 June; 14 Bf 109s, 6 Bf 110s, 11 He 111s, two Ju 87s, 21 Ju 87s, one Do 17 and 6 miscellaneous types. The Romanian Air Force lost four Blenheims, two PZL P-37 fighters, two Savoia-Marchetti SM.79, one Potez 633, one IAR 37 and one IAR 39. Soviet statistics contained considerable exaggeration, claiming "more than 200 enemy aircraft" destroyed on the first day.

The balance of power in the air was altered for the next few months. The Luftwaffe had attained air superiority, if not supremacy at this point. The low German opinion of Soviet combat capabilities had been confirmed, and was bolstered by information provided by captured VVS personnel. The Soviet bomber fleet had been crippled; its remaining forces continued costly attacks on the German rear. The VVS recovered once surprise had worn off. The autumn weather also provided the Soviets with breathing space to partially rebuild.

== Luftwaffe's tactics and pilot skills ==
Among the experienced Soviet pilots who fought during Spanish Civil War against the Luftwaffe, against Empire of Japan in 1939, and Finland in 1939/1940, many understood that war could not be avoided and expected a German attack. What was unexpected for all of them was the nature of the air war that the Luftwaffe imposed on Soviets from the very first hours. First of all, the Germans turned out to be very persistent in achieving their goals. Thus, for the Soviet 10th mixed aviation division, the first strike took by surprise only the 74th assault aviation regiment of Major B.Vasilyev. The 123rd Fighter Aviation Regiment suffered the main losses during the fifth raid, and the 33rd Fighter Aviation Regiment suffered the main losses during the fourth. In the latter case, nine German Messerschmitt Bf 109s managed to deceive the vigilance of air target detection posts, sneaking up at an extremely low altitude, and burned 21 I-16s and 5 I-153s in a 40-minute attack. The regiment was defeated in less than an hour.

The tactics of German aviation consisted of alternating raids on airfields by fighters and bombers in small and medium groups, depending on Soviet opposition. And since many airfields did not have any air defense systems at all, and others had one or two anti-aircraft machine guns, there were no basic shelters for flight and technical personnel, the planes were crowded everywhere and were not camouflaged, the Luftwaffe acted very effectively and almost with impunity. The airfield of the Soviet 122nd Fighter Aviation Regiment near Lida was subjected to four raids by German bombers (in one case, fighter-bombers operated) without any fighter escort.

A very significant factor that influenced the sharp decline in the combat effectiveness of the Soviet Air Force was the loss of control in most Air Force units - aviation divisions, regiments. Things were especially bad on the Soviet Western Front, where the front air force headquarters was virtually inactive during the first three days of the war. Many air regiment commanders assigned their subordinates tasks to conduct combat operations without coordination with higher headquarters.

There was no general plan for withdrawing Soviet air units from German attack. Under these conditions, not all commanders made decisions appropriate to the current situation and tried to maneuver their forces. But failure awaited them too, since it turned out that the Luftwaffe was well aware of the location of Soviet alternate airfields, as well as field sites near the border. Therefore, those Soviet units that were able to relocate on 22 June suffered no less than the rest. Soviet pilots were taught: who could be higher the enemy - he dominates the battle. In real life, German aviation operated at low, and sometimes extremely low, altitudes. Under these conditions, Soviet fighter pilots First of all, those who piloted the new MiG-3 and Yakovlev Yak-1 often could not cope with the machines. German reports indicated that often MiG-3 pilots, fighting at low altitude, could not cope with piloting, went into a tailspin and crashed. The main burden of air battles fell on the veterans: Polikarpov I-16, Polikarpov I-153, Polikarpov I-15bis. In many cases, undeveloped "MiG-3" and "Petlyakov Pe-2" turned out to be useless ballast.

== Differences between the air war on the Eastern Front and the Western Front ==
According to military historians Dmitry Degtev and Dmitry Zubov: "For Russian and German pilots the most terrible fate was to be captured. When a plane was shot down over the UK, the Luftwaffe crew were doomed to stay in a POW camp until the end of the war, but they were sure that they would survive. The same thing happened to the British and Americans when they were shot down over the Third Reich. However, on the Eastern Front everything was different. Red propaganda sought to inspire in soldiers ‘devotion to the Motherland’, and getting captured was considered shameful and a betrayal. By order of Stalin, the families of those who were captured were repressed and deprived of food. The mortality rate Soviet PoW in German camps was also very high. Often German aircrew who had bailed out or made an emergency landing were immediately killed by local residents or angry Red Army soldiers... If the pilots made it to a prison camp, horrors and hardship were waiting for them there. In general, in the East, where there was a ‘war to the death’, the pilots had no guarantee that they would survive! Therefore, once in enemy territory, they first fled the landing site and hid, and then tried to get to the front line and reach their own troops".

== Comparison of the reliability of Soviet/German claims of aerial victories ==
Independent analysis by Western (but non-German) researchers demonstrates that the German aces were very accurate in estimating the number of destroyed Soviet aircraft. Unlike the Germans, Soviet pilots exaggerated their victories by at least 4 times.

German-Soviet air war	Germany's losses			USSR's losses		
German-Soviet air war	Soviet claims	Ratio	German confirmed	German claims	Ratio	Soviet confirmed
Completely destroyed combat aircraft at air 22 June 1941	243	7:1 or 4:1	35 or 55 or 57	322	1:1	336
Completely destroyed combat aircraft at air and on ground 22.06-31.12.41	7,888	4:1	2,093	17,745	1,1:1	15,840

== Losses ==
According to New Zealand military historian David Stahel: "In the opening days of Barbarossa the Luftwaffe inflicted carnage upon the Soviet air force".

Based on Soviet reports received from the frontier areas on 22 June (obviously, extremely incomplete due to the chaos, confusion and hasty retreat of the Soviets), Red Army Air Force headquarters concluded that at least 1,136 Soviet combat aircraft (including 10 from Black Sea Fleet Air Force) were completely destroyed on the first day of the war. From this came the now well-known figure of 1,200 lost Soviet aircraft. German reports claim that 322 Soviet aircraft were shot down in the air and 1,489 destroyed on the ground. The last figure was obtained by counting captured aircraft discovered at airfields and landing-sites. A detailed study of the vehicles captured by the Germans and published photographs showed that not all Soviet fighters, bombers, and attack aircraft were seriously damaged as a result of air raids. Often planes were blown up and burned not by German bombs, but by their own crews during the retreat – due to the inability to evacuate equipment in the chaos of the retreat. During the first day of the German-Soviet war, according to very incomplete Soviet archival data, reliable Soviet losses amounted to at least 2,000 combat aircraft.

According to German reports, 1,811 Soviet aircraft were destroyed on the ground and in the air on 22 June, another 755 on 23 June, and total of 2,546 in just two days of war. Soviet official losses give (even despite the obvious incompleteness of the data due to the loss of documents during a hasty retreat) an even higher figure - 2,949. Thus, the Luftwaffe underestimated the number of destroyed Soviet aircraft. Another Western (non-German) source states that German losses amounted to 78 combat aircraft on June 22–24 against 3,922 completely destroyed Soviet aircraft.

Commenting on the German losses on 22 June, the German historian Jochen Prien writes that such losses were not the highest for the Luftwaffe. In the Battle of Britain, on 18 August 1940, Germans lost 77 aircraft and 163 flight personnel irretrievably due to British opposition, and on 15 September of the same year - 61 and 188, respectively. The first day of Axis aggression against the Soviet Union cost the lives of 133 aircrew members.

According to the official German history of the Second World War:

"The attacks in the early morning of 22 June were directed primarily against thirty-one airfields and against the supposed quarters of senior staffs, barracks, artillery positions, bunkers, and oil-storage facilities. Initially Soviet fighters showed little desire to engage in combat and turned away at considerable range if fire was opened. Soviet anti-aircraft fire was initially weak. On the morning of 22 June the Soviets lost a total of 890 aircraft, 222 of them in aerial combat or to anti-aircraft fire and 668 on the ground. The Luftwaffe, on the other hand, lost only 18 aircraft. By midnight on 22 June, Soviet losses had risen to a total of 1,811 aircraft, with 1,489 destroyed on the ground and 322 destroyed mostly in the air. German losses rose to 35 aircraft. During the first days of the attack aerial reconnaissance discovered many previously unknown airfields with a large number of aircraft, which necessitated continued massed attacks by the Luftwaffe against Soviet air-force units during the following days. Between 23 and 26 June a total of 123 airfields were attacked. By the end of June some 330 German aircraft had been lost, against a total of 4,614 Soviet aircraft reported destroyed, 1,438 in the air and 3,176 on the ground. By the end of the fighting in the frontier area on 12 July, the figures had risen to 6,857 Soviet aircraft destroyed against 550 total losses on the German side."

== Outcome ==
The German-Soviet battle on 22 June has no equal in military history. Although the Germans were inferior to the Soviets by more than 5 times in the number of single-engine fighters, due to catching the Soviet pilots by surprise and not even allowing the majority to enter the air, they were able to seize air superiority and inflict heavy losses on Soviet Air Forces.
