= Vera Bulich =

Finnish poet, writer and critic (1898–1954)

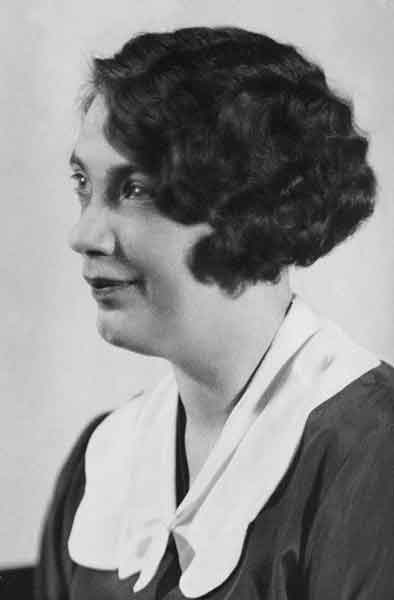
- Born: 1898; Saint Petersburg
- Died: 1954 (aged 55–56); Helsinki
- Occupation: Poet

Vera Sergeyevna Bulich (1898–1954) was a poet, prose writer and critic born in the Russian Empire who lived most of her life in Finland. Georgii Adamovich compared the fine delicacy of her poetry to the finish of Chinese porcelain.

== Life ==
The daughter of Sergei Bulich, a St Petersburg University professor specializing in Russian linguistics and music history, Vera Bulich was born in Saint Petersburg on 17 February 1898. The family fled Saint Petersburg after the Russian Revolution and settled in Finland. There she worked in the Slavic Department of the University of Helsinki library. In 1947 was appointed head of the newly founded Institute for Soviet Studies, establishing a library of over 20,000 volumes. She died of lung cancer in Helsinki on 2 July 1954.

From 1920 Bulich published Russian poetry, reviews and translations in émigré journals. Her first book (1927) was a collection of fairy tales for children in Finnish; subsequent books – another collection of fairy tales, and four books of poetry – were written in Russian.

== Works ==
- Satu pikkiriikkisesta prinsessasta, 1927
- Skazki [Fairy tales], 2 vols., 1931
- Maiatnik. Pervaia kniga stikhov [Pendulum: A First Collection of Poems], 1934
- Plennyi veter. Vtoraia kniga stikhov [Captive Wind: A Second Collection of Poems], 1938
- Burelom. Tret`ia kniga stikhov [Storm-Felled Wood: A Third Collection of Poems], 1947
- Vetvi. Chetvërtaia kniga stikhov [Branches: A Fourth Collection of Poems], 1954
