= Dmitry Pletnyov =

Dmitry Pletnyov may refer to:

- Dmitry Pletnyov (doctor) (1871/1872–1941), Russian doctor
- Dmitry Pletnyov (footballer) (born 1998), Russian football player
