= Konstantin Petrovich Grigorovich =

- Born: 18 September 1886; Mykolaiv, Kherson Governorate, Russian Empire
- Died: 15 April 1939 (aged 52); Kommunarka shooting ground, Moscow Oblast, Soviet Union
- Citizenship: USSR
- Education: Peter the Great St. Petersburg Polytechnic University
- Known for: Specialist in the field of physical-technical problems in energetics and energetic machinery construction
- Awards: Order of Lenin
- Scientific career
- Fields: metallurgy
- Workplaces: «Spetsstal» trust

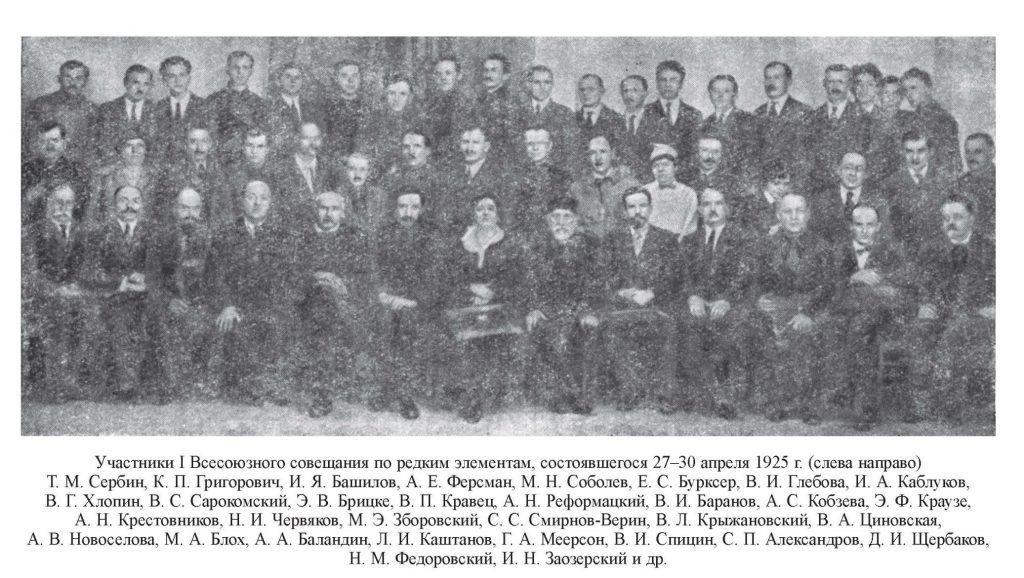
K.P. Grigorovich at the 1st All-Union Meeting on Rare Elements, 1925

Konstantin Petrovich Grigorovich (Russian: Константи́н Петро́вич Григоро́вич; 18 September 1886 — 15 April 1939) was a metallurgical engineer, founder of the soviet school of electrometallurgy, professor (1921), doctor of technical sciences (1934).

== Biography ==
Grigorovich Konstantin Petrovich was born 18 September 1886 in Mykolaiv.

In 1913 graduated from Peter the Great St. Petersburg Polytechnic University.

Places of work: from 1913 worked as an engineer at Kirov Plant in St-Petersburg, at the Metallurgical factory of Elektrostal in the city of Elektrostal, Moscow Oblast. From 1920 — head of the electrometallurgical department of the Moscow Mining Academy, from 1931 — technical director of the Spetsstal trust.

His knowledge in the field of metallurgy has proved to be extremely useful during the construction and installation of the soviet ferroalloy factories - in Chelyabinsk (1931), Zestaponi (1934) and in Zaporizhia (1934). In Chelyabinsk he inspected quality of construction works and deployment of several factories: Ferroalloy (July 1931), ferrochrome (1935), electrocorundum (1933), electrode (1934) and abrasive tools (1935).

Field of academic interests: theoretical and practical electrometallurgical production, production of ferroalloys. Grigorovich K. P. — professor (1921), doctor of technical sciences (1934).

Was arrested on 19 September 1938 on false charges for being a member of a counterrevolutionary terrorist organization (included to the list as an active member of counterrevolutionary right-wing Trotskyist, conspirative and spy organization) (931 people on the list) prosecuted by Lavrentiy Beria and Andrey Vyshinsky. Sentenced to death on 14 April 1939. The sentence was executed on 15 April 1939 at the Kommunarka shooting ground. He was rehabilitated on 22 February 1956.

== Works ==
- Grigorovich K. P. Electrometallurgy of steel. — 1922. — Part 1 : Electric furnaces.
- Grigorovich K. P. Production of steel in electrical furnaces — 1932.
- Grigorovich K. P. Production of bearing steel. — 1932.
- Grigorovich K. P. Chelyabinsk electrometallurgical plant. — 1935.
