= Jan Spielrein =

Russian and Soviet mathematician (1887–1938)

Jan Nikolaevich Spielrein
- Ян Николаевич Шпильрейн
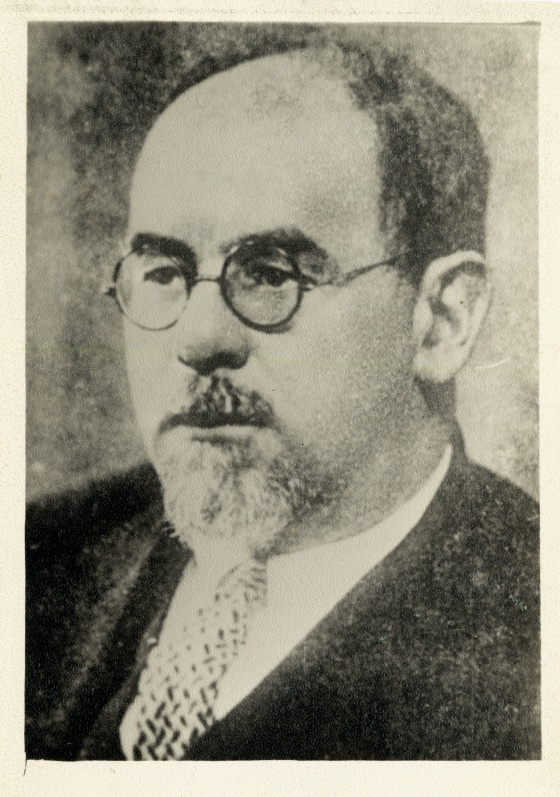
- Spielrein c. 1938
- Born: June 14, 1887; Rostov-on-Don, Russian Empire
- Died: January 21, 1938; Kommunarka shooting ground, Moscow Oblast, Russian SFSR, Soviet Union
- Education: University of Sorbonne
- Scientific career
- Fields: Mathematics

Jan Nikolaevich Spielrein (Russian: Ян Николаевич Шпильрейн, romanized: Yan Nikolayevich Shpilreyn; 26 June [O.S. 14 June] 1887 – 21 January 1938) was a Russian and Soviet mathematician. He was a member of the Soviet Academy of Sciences.

== Biography ==
He was born in 1887 in the Rostov-on-Don into a wealthy and talented Jewish family; his siblings included the pioneering psychoanalyst Sabina Spielrein.

In 1907 he graduated from the Department of Physics and Mathematics of the University of Sorbonne, in 1911 the Higher Polytechnic School in Karlsruhe. After 1911 Spielrein was an assistant professor at the University of Stuttgart.

In the second half of 1918 he returned from Germany to Russia, taught at the Krasnodar Polytechnic Institute. In 1920–1921 Spielrein worked in the Bureau of Foreign Science and Technology in Moscow. Since 1921, he holds the post of professor of the electrical engineering faculty of the Moscow Higher Technical School.

In 1930, Spielrein joined the newly formed Moscow Power Engineering Institute. Until the end of his life he was a professor, head of the department of higher mathematics, dean of the general and electrophysical faculties of the Moscow Power Engineering Institute.

His field of research was the application of vector calculus, tensor analysis and other mathematical methods in electrical engineering, heating engineering and radio engineering. He was also the author of the first handbook in the USSR on special functions in engineering calculations, one of the first to introduce a vector presentation in the course of theoretical mechanics.

Spielrein was arrested on September 10, 1937, and sentenced to the death penalty by the Supreme Soviet of the Soviet Union on January 21, 1938, on charges of participating in the Democratic Party. He was executed by a firing squad at the Kommunarka shooting ground on the same day. On February 4, 1956, Spielrein was rehabilitated.

== Literature ==
- Jean Spielrein. Lehrbuch der Vektorrechnung nach den Bedürfnissen in der technischen Mechanik und Elektrizitätslehre. Stuttgart: Konrad Wittwer, 1916.
- Jean Spielrein. Vectorrechnung: Lehrbuch der vektorrechnung nach den bedürfnissen in der technischen mechanik und elektrizitätslehre. 2 verb. und verm. Aufl. Mit 62 textabbildungen und einer formelsammlung. Stuttgart: Verlag von Konrad Wittwer, 1926. — 434 s.
- Векторное исчисление. Руководство для инженеров и физиков. М.—Л.: Госиздат, 1925. — 324 стр.
- Современные математические методы в применении к вопросам электротехники и теплотехники. М.-Л.: Объединённое научно-техническое издательство, Главная редакция энергетической литературы, 1936.
