= Vasiliy Khripin =

Vasiliy Vladimirovich Khripin
- Born: February 26, 1893; Yaroslavl Governorate, Russian Empire
- Died: July 29, 1938 (aged 45) Moscow Oblast, Soviet Union
- Allegiance: Russian Empire; Soviet Union
- Branch: Imperial Russian Air Force; Soviet Air Force
- Service years: 1914–1917 (Russian Empire); 1918–1937 (Soviet Union)
- Conflicts: World War I Russian Civil War

Vasiliy Vladimirovich Khripin (February 26, 1893 – July 29, 1938), was a Soviet Air Force General. He fought in the Imperial Russian military in World War I before going over to the Bolsheviks during the subsequent Civil War. He was a recipient of the Order of the Red Banner and the Order of the Red Star.

During the Great Purge, he was arrested on November 26, 1937, and executed the following year at Kommunarka.

Lieutenant General Khripin was not mentioned again in the Soviet press until almost 25 years later, when the Soviet Defense Ministry newspaper Krasnaya Zvesda ran an article on February 26, 1963, commemorating the 70th anniversary of General Khripin's birth. Retired Air Force General Alexander V. Belyakov wrote the feature and praised Khripin as an innovator in Soviet aviation.

== Bibliography ==
- Цыкин А. Д. От «Ильи Муромца» до ракетоносца — Краткий очерк истории Дальней Авиации. — Moscow: Военное издательство МО, 1975. — C. 45.
- Беляков А. В. В полет сквозь годы. — Воениздат, 1981.
- Дуэ Д. Господство в воздухе: Сборник трудов по вопросам воздушной войны. — Moscow: Государственное военное издательство Наркомата обороны Союза ССР, 1936. — С. 14.
- Авиация: Энциклопедия / Главный редактор Г. П. Свищев. — Moscow: Большая Российская Энциклопедия, 1994.
- Черушев Н. С. (2003). 1937 год: элита Красной Армии на Голгофе. Военные тайны XX века (5000 экз ed.). М.: Вече. ISBN 5-94538-305-8.
- Черушев Н. С.; Черушев Ю. Н. (2012), Расстрелянная элита РККА (командармы 1-го и 2-го рангов, комкоры, комдивы и им равные): 1937—1941. Биографический словарь [Shot elite of the Red Army (commanders of the 1st and 2nd ranks, comkors, divisional commanders and their equal): 1937-1941. Biographical Dictionary], Moscow: Kuchkovo field; Metropolis [Кучково поле; Мегаполис], pp. 122–123, ISBN 978-5-9950-0217-8
