= Vasily Anisimoff =

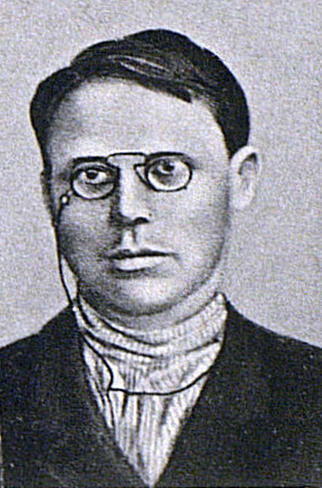
- Born: Vasily Afanasiev; 1878 village Apanasovo-Tamashi, Kazan Governorate, Imperial Russia
- Died: 25 April 1938; Stalin camps, shot, USSR (Kommunarka village)

Vasily Onisimovich Afanasiev (Russian: Васи́лий Они́симович Афана́сьев, a.k.a. Vasily Anisimovich Anisimoff Russian: Васи́лий Ани́симович Ани́симов; 1878 - 1938) was a revolutionary and a propagandist of Marxism as well as a prominent activist and supporter of the Russian and international Socialist movement. He was among the active members of the RSDLP and was a Menshevik. In 1925, Anisimoff became the deputy head of the economic department of the Supreme Soviet of the National Economy of the RSFSR, managing the "Exportles" trust.

Anisimoff was the younger brother of a famous Soviet pedagogue Pyotr Afanasiev, grandfather of the Soviet writer Vladimir Amlinsky, and the great-grandfather of the composer and physicist Vladimir Anisimoff

== Biography ==
Vasily Anisimovich Anisimoff (alias, né Vasily Onisimovich Afanasiev), the youngest child in the family of protopriest Father Onesimus (Onesimus Afanasiev), was born in 1878 in the remote village of Apanasovo-Tamashi of Kazan province (now Kazan region), where his father, a graduate of the Saint Petersburg Theological seminary, had been sent in the early 1870s to serve as the Dean of the local church.

Vasily Anisimoff entered the Kazan Pedagogical Seminary and, in 1898, successfully passed the examination for the title of magister. In 1905, Anisimoff graduated from the Kazan Teachers Institute (now Tatar State University of Humanities and Education).

During the years of study at the Kazan Teachers Institute, about mid-1902, he accepted the program and joined the social democratic movement which was spreading in the Saratov and Kazan provinces. Whilst being a teacher at Kuznetsky mining school, on 6 February 1907 he becomes a member of the II State Duma from the Saratov province.

Vasily Anisimoff was a strong supporter of the Democratic element in the Social Democratic movement and as a result, while being a member of the Committee of the Social Democratic faction, he also joined Mensheviks. Vasily Anisimoff actively worked as a member of the Food Commission and the Commission for Public Education. In 1907, he was elected as a delegate to the 5th Congress of the RSDLP, which was held from 30 April to 19 May 1907 in London.

After the dissolution of the II State Duma by the decision of the special presence of the Senate on 1 December 1907, Vasily Anisimoff became one of 16 deputies from the Social Democrats, the issuance of which the government demanded on the eve of the dissolution of the State Duma, and sentenced to 5 years in a Russian penal colony.

Vasily Anisimoff served his sentence in St. Petersburg transit prison, then Alexandrskaya katorjnaya prison in Irkutsk province.

Whilst being sentenced, Vasily Anisimoff contributes to the Siberian legal Social-Democratic press. In 1916, in Chita he was elected as the Secretary of the TRANS-Baikal Association of cooperatives that was under the influence of Social-Democratic ideas.

After the 1917 February Revolution, he left Siberia and arrived at Petrograd in March 1917. Anisimoff participated in the work of the 1-st All-Russian Congress of Soviets of workers' and soldiers' deputies. He became a member of the Bureau of the Executive Committee of the Petrograd and one of the deputies of Chairman of Petrograd Soviet, serving since May 1917 until the resignation of the Menshevik Presidium in early September of the same year.

Vasily Anisimoff also actively participated in the Temporary Council of the Russian Republic (pre-Parliament). There he is identified with the left wing group, headed by Lev Kamenev, who sought the peaceful development of the revolution. However, the right wing faction led by Leon Trotsky and Lenin won.

After these events Vasily Anisimoff returned to Siberia, where he stayed for the entirety of the Russian Civil War. In 1918-1919 he contributed to an Irkutsk newspaper called "Nashe Delo," which fought against the dictatorship of the proletariat. In 1921 Vasily Anisimoff becomes a member of the Constituent Assembly of the Far Eastern Republic, one of the few representatives of the Social Democratic Mensheviks in the coalition of Communist-Socialist government.

From 1918 to 1924 he worked in Siberia as an employee of the newspaper "Our Business", then Minister of Industry for the Far Eastern Republic. In 1923-1924 Vasily Anisimoff was nominated for the post of chairman of the state trust "Far Eastern forest" in Vladivostok.

In Moscow he became Deputy head of the economic Department of VSNKh (the Supreme Council of National Economy) of the RSFSR and simultaneously managing trust "Exportles".

During the peak of the Stalinist repression in 1937, Vasily Anisimoff was arrested and sent to the Stalinist camps. On 25 April 1938, through the decision of the notorious triple, he was declared an "enemy of the people" and sentenced to execution by firing squad. It was carried out at the Kommunarka shooting ground in the Moscow region.

His wife, Tsitsiliya (Tsilya or Tsinya) Veniaminovna Anisimova (1890–?), was sentenced on June 10, 1938, as a ChSIR to eight years in a corrective labor camp. On August 10, 1938, she arrived at the Akmolinsk Camp Division of Karlag from Butyrka Prison; on November 3, 1939, she was transferred by convoy to NKVD Construction Site No. 203.
