= Pavel Bulanov =

NKVD officer (1895–1938)

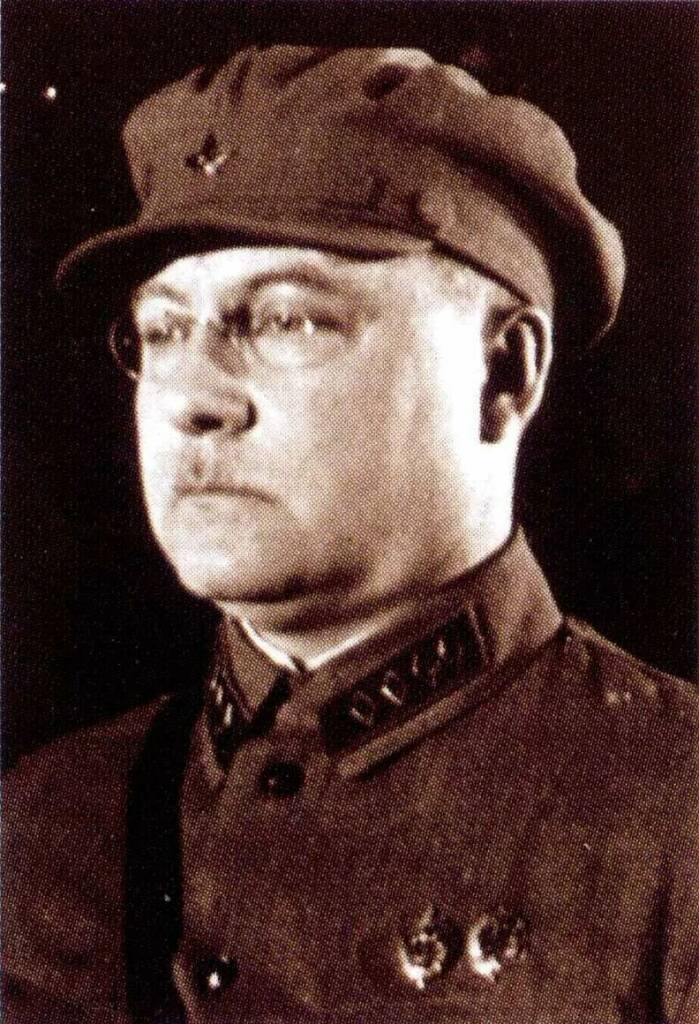
Pavel Bulanov

Pavel Petrovich Bulanov (Russian: Па́вел Петро́вич Була́нов; 1895 – March 15, 1938) was an NKVD officer and secretary to Genrikh Yagoda, who became head of the NKVD in July 1934. Bulanov served as the first head of the Special Council of the NKVD.

Bulanov and Yagoda were arrested and charged with espionage, attempted murder and other crimes and included among the defendants in the Case of the Anti-Soviet "Bloc of Rights and Trotskyites". He was found guilty and executed in 1938 and subsequently rehabilitated.

== Early years ==
Bulanov was born in 1895 in the village of Insar, Penza Governorate, the son of a forester of Russian ethnicity. In 1916, after graduating from the Penza Land Surveying School, he was drafted into the Russian Imperial Army; during the First World War he served in a reserve regiment stationed in Saratov, from August 1916 to January 1917. In 1917, while in Moscow in search of work, he met Mikhail Frinovsky, who helped him get a job in the office of one of the Red Guard detachments. He did not participate in the Civil War.

== Soviet career ==
Bulanov joined the Russian Communist Party (b) ("RCP (b)") in the autumn of 1918. He worked in a series of increasingly responsible assignments in the government's food distribution efforts in Penza, starting as a clerk in the Insar district food committee in January 1917, ending as head of food distribution. During the period from February to August 1921 he served as executive secretary of the Insar district committee of the RCP (b).

Beginning in 1921, he served in the bodies of the Cheka, OGPU, and NKVD, starting as a member of the collegium of the Penza provincial Cheka in the Secret Political Department of the Cheka. He was engaged in the cases of those accused of anti-Soviet activities and counter-revolution, as well as foreign agents in the USSR. In January and February 1929 he led the secret removal of Leon Trotsky, who was in exile in Alma-Ata, to Odessa and his deportation on the steamer Ilyich from the USSR to Turkey. He was elected a delegate to the XVII Congress of the CPSU (b) (1934; personally, with an advisory vote) and as a delegate to the VIII All-Union Congress of Soviets (1936).

After the creation of the NKVD 7 October 1934, Bulanov became the secretary of the people's commissariat. Bulanov was engaged in the development of the procedures for repressive actions, drawing up the regulatory documents on the manner of treating prisoners and those under investigation. One of the confidants of Genrikh Yagoda, the People's Commissar of the NKVD, he was one of the organizers of the trial of Grigory Zinoviev and Lev Kamenev in August 1936. He wrote the scenario for the trial and the scripts for the defendants' testimony, whom he put through several rehearsals before the trial began.

Bulanov also acquired the reputation of being a toady for Yagoda and of distributing valuables confiscated from the arrested among the top leadership of the NKVD. That charge of misappropriation of confiscated property was later used as grounds for his removal from office.

== Purge, execution and rehabilitation ==
Bulanov knew Nikolai Yezhov well, with whom he had friendly relations, and remained the secretary of the NKVD for a time after Nikolai Yezhov became head of the NKVD on 26 September 1936. He was entrusted with the organization of the Second Moscow Trial in January 1937.

On March 29, 1937, Bulanov was arrested on Yezhov's orders, removed from the post of secretary, dismissed from the NKVD and expelled from the CPSU (b) as "an ideologically alien element". Yagoda was arrested at the same time.

Yagoda was accused, among other things, of ordering Bulanov to spray poison on the walls of Yezhov's office; in fact Yezhov ordered the NKVD to sprinkle mercury on the curtains of his office so that the physical evidence could be collected and used to support the charge that Yagoda was a German spy, sent to assassinate Yezhov and Stalin with poison and restore capitalism. Yezhov later admitted under an interrogation on 5 May 1939 that he had fabricated the mercury poisoning to "raise his authority in the eyes of the leadership of the country". Mikhail Bulgakov included this anecdote in his novel The Master and Margarita, completed in 1940 but only published 30 years after the events.

Both Yagoda and Bulanov were put on trial with 19 others on March 2, 1938. Bulanov testified at length about the supposed plot to kill Yezhov, claiming that Yagoda ordered him on September 29, 1936, several days after Yagoda had been removed from his position in the NKVD, to spray Yezhov's offices with mercury dissolved in acid, along with another unnamed poison that he claimed Yezhov took out of his locker.

Bulanov also testified that Yagoda had, with the assistance of Ivan Zaporozhets, head of the Leningrad branch of the NKVD, organized the 1934 assassination of Sergei Kirov; Bulanov also accused Zaporozhets of the murder of Kirov's bodyguard the following day. Yagoda accepted guilt for Kirov's murder, elaborating on Bulanov's claims in his testimony.

On March 13, 1938, all defendants were found guilty. Bulanov, Yagoda and 16 other defendants were executed two days later. His common-law wife was also executed as a Japanese spy.

Although Bulanov was rehabilitated in 1988, Yagoda was never rehabilitated (exonerated).

== Bibliography ==
- N.V. Petrov (Н.В.Петров) y K.V. Skorkin ( К.В.Скоркин). “Who ran the NKVD. 1934-1941" ("Кто руководил НКВД. 1934-1941") (in Russian)
- K. A. Zalesskiy "The Empire of Stalin. Encyclopedic Biographical Dictionary", Moscow, 2000." I. A. Zelenskiy (in Russian)
