= Abram Belenky =

Russian revolutionary and guardsman (1883–1941)

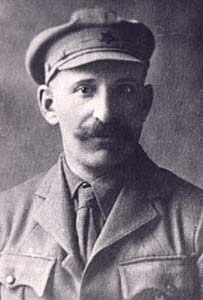
Abram Belenky

Abram Yakovlevich Belenky (Russian: Абра́м Я́ковлевич Бе́ленький) (1882 or 1883 – 16 October 1941) was a Russian revolutionary, Bolshevik and a major functionary of the Soviet secret police (Cheka / OGPU / NKVD).

Born into a Jewish family in Swierżań, Russian Empire, he became a member of the RSDLP in 1898. In 1919-1924, he was a head of V.I. Lenin's security detail. He was later promoted to a major in the NKVD. On 9 May 1938, Belenky was arrested and accused of having taken part in a counter-revolutionary plot organized by former NKVD officers, including Genrikh Yagoda. He was sentenced by the Special Council of the NKVD (OSO) to five years of Gulag imprisonment. In 1940, his sentence was cancelled and his case was re-opened, with the eventual outcome that he was executed by firing-squad on 16 October 1941.
