= Tobias Akselrod =

Soviet politician

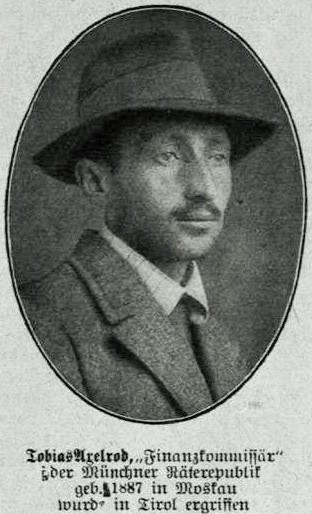
Tobias Akselrod (1887–1938) Russian journalist

Tobias Akselrod (15 October 1887 in Moscow – 10 March 1938 in Kommunarka shooting ground, Moscow Oblast) was a Russian revolutionary and journalist.

He was a member of the Bavarian Soviet Republic and Action Committee of the Communist Soviet Republic.

== Biography ==
Tobias Akselrod was born in Moscow. Akselrod joined the Jewish Labour Bund in 1905. In 1910, he fled to Switzerland from his exile in Siberia. He worked there for the Social Democrat Berner Tagwacht newspaper and was a member of the Zimmerwald Left. In April 1917, he returned to Russia on the sealed train with Lenin. After the October Revolution, he became the head of the press office of the Council of People's Commissars and in April 1918, became the head of the press office of the Central Executive Bureau of the Bolsheviks (Sovnarkom).

From July 1918, he was head of the Soviet press service in Germany. In September, he became member of the Central Committee of the Russian Communist Party. He stayed out of the November revolution in Copenhagen, returning the 8 December to Germany. On 14 January 1919, he was arrested in Stuttgart and was placed under house arrest by Kurt Eisner in the Ebenhausen sanatorium. In April 1919 he became a member of the Action Committee of the Workers' and Soldiers' Council and an advisory member of the Economics Commission. After the suppression of the Council Republic he was apprehended on 14 May in Tyrol and sent back to Munich. On 11June, there was a protest in Moscow due to his arrest and on 25 July, he was accused and sentenced to 15 years in prison.

In November 1919, he was transferred from Munich to Berlin-Moabit prison. On 22 May, his lawyers Steppacher and Gänssler, applied for his release from prison because he had diplomatic status as head of the Soviet press service "Rosta". On 6 June 1920 he was able to leave via Stettin to Petrograd. He became editor of the Bulletin of the Communist International (Comintern) for the Russian press, the party organisation of the All-Russian Communist Party (Bolsheviks) and Cultural propaganda (Narkompros) in the Russian Soviet republic. From 1921 to 1922 he was head of the publishing department of the Executive Committee of the Communist International (ECCI).

After April 1922, he stayed in Switzerland, Austria and France. He wrote for the L’Humanité (the French Communist Party's newspaper). He returned to Soviet Russia at the end of 1925 and worked as a journalist.

In the course of Stalin's Great Purges he was arrested on 23 December 1937 and sentenced to death on 10 March 1938 for alleged membership in a "counterrevolutionary terrorist organization" by the Military Collegium of the Supreme Court of the Soviet Union and executed the same day.
