= Case of the Anti-Soviet "Bloc of Rightists and Trotskyites" =

1938 trial during the Soviet Great Purge

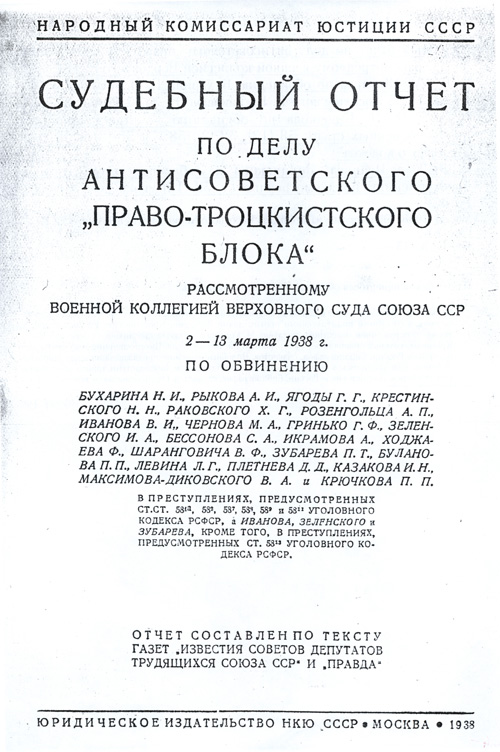
Court Report on the Trial of the Right-Trotskyist Bloc (1938 Edition)

The Case of the Anti-Soviet "Bloc of Rightists and Trotskyites" (or "Bloc of Rights and Trotskyites"; Russian: Процесс антисоветского «право-троцкистского блока»), also known as the Trial of the Twenty-One, was the last of the three public Moscow trials charging prominent Bolsheviks with espionage and treason. The Trial of the Twenty-One took place in Moscow in March 1938, towards the end of the Soviet Great Purge. The accused were tortured to extract confessions and publicly admitted their guilt during the show trial. Most of the accused, including Nikolai Bukharin, Alexei Rykov and Genrikh Yagoda, were convicted, and sentenced to death. All charges are considered fabricated except those against NKVD chief Genrikh Yagoda of poisoning Valerian Kuybyshev, Vyacheslav Menzhinsky, and Maxim Gorky; Yagoda might indeed have conducted the poisoning with the assistance of "Kremlin's doctors" Dmitry Pletnyov and Lev Levin, but they did it on the orders from Stalin himself.

== The bloc of oppositions ==
There was indeed a secret bloc of oppositions against Stalin. Trotskyists and rightist communists were its main members. It originated because the various open opposition groups that had tried to oppose Stalin in the Communist Party had failed, and their former members barely had any power. The former leader of the Left Opposition Leon Trotsky was deported from the Soviet Union, Lev Kamenev and Grigori Zinoviev held low ranks in the party, and the rights were sidelined. Some bolsheviks then decided to form underground opposition groups against Stalin and the party leadership. The bloc formed in late 1932, and was a loose alliance between many of them. Trotsky, Zinoviev and Kamenev were some of its members. This bloc, according to some historians, helped organize the Ryutin affair, where a manifesto was passed among many party members that declared Stalin "must be removed by force" and for the immediate "liquidation of the dictatorship of Stalin and his clique".

Pierre Broué and a number of historians concluded the bloc and the opposition ceased to exist by early 1933, because many of its leaders were arrested. However, some documents found after Broué's search showed that the Underground Opposition stayed active even in prison, in fact, the prisons became the centers of activities of the trotskyists.

== The charges ==
The third trial, in March 1938, known as The Trial of the Twenty-One, is the last of the Soviet Union trials. It included 21 defendants alleged to belong to the so-called "Bloc of Rightists and Trotskyites":

1. Nikolai Bukharin – Marxist theoretician, former head of the Communist International and member of the Politburo
2. Alexei Rykov – former premier and member of the Politburo
3. Nikolay Krestinsky – former member of the Politburo and ambassador to Germany
4. Christian Rakovsky – former ambassador to Great Britain and France
5. Genrikh Yagoda – former head of the NKVD
6. Arkady Rosengoltz – former People's Commissar for Foreign Trade
7. Vladimir Ivanov – former People's Commissar for the Timber Industry
8. Mikhail Chernov – former People's Commissar for Agriculture
9. Grigori Grinko – former People's Commissar for Finance
10. Isaak Zelensky – former Secretary of the Central Committee
11. Sergei Bessonov
12. Akmal Ikramov – Uzbek leader
13. Faizulla Khodjayev – Uzbek leader
14. Vasily Sharangovich – former first secretary in Byelorussia
15. Prokopy Zubarev
16. Pavel Bulanov – NKVD officer
17. Lev Levin – Kremlin doctor
18. Dmitry Pletnyov – Kremlin doctor
19. Ignaty Kazakov – Kremlin doctor
20. Venyamin Maximov-Dikovsky
21. Pyotr Kryuchkov – secretary of Maxim Gorky

They were all proclaimed members of the Right-Trotskyist bloc that supposedly intended to overthrow socialism and restore capitalism in Russia, among other things.

Meant to be the culmination of previous trials, it was alleged that Bukharin and others committed the following crimes:

- murdering Sergey Kirov, Valerian Kuybyshev, State Political Directorate (OGPU) chair Vyacheslav Menzhinsky, and writer Maxim Gorky and his son
- unsuccessfully trying to assassinate Vladimir Lenin, Joseph Stalin, and Yakov Sverdlov in 1918
- plotting to assassinate Yakov Sverdlov, Vyacheslav Molotov, Lazar Kaganovich, Kliment Voroshilov, and Stalin
- conspiring to wreck the economy (by sabotaging mines, derailing trains, killing cattle, deliberately organizing deficit of food products, putting nails and glasses in butter) and the country's military power
- Spying for British, French, Japanese, and German intelligence agencies
- making secret agreements with Germany and Japan, promising to surrender Belarus, Ukraine, Central Asia, and the Russian Far East to foreign powers

All of the defendants confessed to these charges during the show trial with a few notable, but limited, exceptions. The charges have been characterized as "fantastic". The defendants supposedly organized explosions in mines, hoping to kill as many miners as possible, as well as railway accidents. The most nightmarish confessions were made by Zelensky: working in the trade sector he supposedly wanted to organize famine and "confessed" that in order to harm Soviet people his organization put glass and nails in the butter to cut the consumers' throats and stomachs.

== The trial ==
The preparation for this trial was delayed in its early stages due to the reluctance of some party members to denounce their comrades. Stalin personally intervened to speed up the process and replaced Yagoda with Nikolai Yezhov.

Only one defendant, Nikolai Krestinsky, initially refused to admit his guilt. He changed his position within a day, however, telling Public Prosecutor Andrei Vyshinsky: "I fully and completely admit that I am guilty of all the gravest charges brought against me personally, and that I admit my complete responsibility for the treason and treachery I have committed."

Bukharin's confession was limited in a different fashion. Observers have speculated that Bukharin had reached some sort of agreement with the prosecution: while he admitted guilt to general charges, he undercut that by denying any knowledge when it came to specific crimes. Bukharin typically would admit only what was in his written confessions and refused to go any further; at one point in the trial, when Vyshinsky asked him about a conspiracy to weaken Soviet military power, Bukharin responded "it was not discussed, at least in my presence", at which point Vyshinsky dropped the question and moved to another topic.

There is other evidence that Bukharin had reached an agreement to trade his confession for personal concessions of some sort. Anastas Mikoyan and Vyacheslav Molotov claim that Bukharin was never tortured. Bukharin had been allowed to write four book-length manuscripts, including an autobiographical novel, How It All Began, a philosophical treatise, and a collection of poems – all of which were found in Stalin's archive and published in the 1990s – while in prison. Bukharin also wrote a series of very emotional letters to Stalin protesting his innocence and professing his love for Stalin, which contrasts with his critical opinion of Stalin and his policies expressed to others and his conduct in the trial.

Yet Bukharin appears to have strayed from that agreement at trial. While he had accepted responsibility "even for those crimes about which I did not know or about which I did not have the slightest idea" on the theory that he was the head of the "Bloc of Rightists and Trotskyites", he testified that the Bloc did not exist and its members had never met.

The result was a curious mix of fulsome confessions and subtle criticisms of the trial. After disproving several charges against him (one observer noted that he proceeded to demolish or rather showed he could very easily demolish the whole case) and saying that "the confession of accused is not essential. The confession of the accused is a medieval principle of jurisprudence" in the trial that was solely based on confessions, he finished his last plea with "the monstrousness of my crime is immeasurable especially in the new stage of struggle of the U.S.S.R. May this trial be the last severe lesson, and may the great might of the U.S.S.R. become clear to all."

In his final word, Vyshinsky said: "All our country, from small one to old one, awaits and demands one thing: traitors and spies who sold to the enemy our homeland to be shot like mad dogs. Our people demands one thing: crush the accursed vermin!"

== Verdict ==
All but three were found guilty "of having committed extremely grave state offenses covered by ... the Criminal Code ... sentenced to the supreme penalty—to be shot." Pletnyov was sentenced to 25 years in prison, Rakovsky to 20 years, and Bessonov to 15 years. Vasily Blokhin, the chief executioner of the NKVD, conducted all of the executions personally.

== Reactions to the trial ==
Even observers who had previously supported the earlier trials found the new charges increasingly difficult to accept, as they seemed to take on a more exaggerated character. By this stage, the purge had come to encompass a third of the Old Bolsheviks, Notable survivors being Joseph Stalin, Mikhail Kalinin, Lazar Kaganovich, Alexandra Kollontai, Lydia Fotiyeva, Anastas Mikoyan among many more. For some prominent former communists, such as Bertram Wolfe, Jay Lovestone, Arthur Koestler, and Heinrich Brandler, the Bukharin trial marked their final break with communism and turned the first three into ardent anti-communists.

Bukharin's testimony became the subject of much debate among Western observers, inspiring Koestler's acclaimed novel Darkness at Noon and a philosophical essay by Maurice Merleau-Ponty in Humanism and Terror, among others. Koestler and others viewed Bukharin's testimony as a true believer's last service to the Party (while preserving a small amount of personal honor) whereas Bukharin biographer Stephen Cohen and Robert Tucker saw traces of Aesopian language, with which Bukharin sought to turn the table into trial of Stalinism, while keeping his part of bargain to save his family. Bukharin himself speaks of his "peculiar duality of mind" in his last plea, which led to "semi-paralysis of the will" and Hegelian "unhappy consciousness", which presumably stemmed from the conflict between his knowledge of the reality of Stalinist rule and the threat of fascism, which led Bukharin and others to follow Stalin, who had become the personification of the Party.

Others were not so critical of the trial. Ambassador Joseph Davies, author of Mission to Moscow, wrote that "It is generally accepted by members of the Diplomatic Corps that the accused must have been guilty of an offense which in the Soviet Union would merit the death penalty". Beatrice Webb, the British Fabian, stated that she was happy that Stalin had "cut out the dead wood". Bertolt Brecht, whose lover Carola Neher had disappeared after her return to the Soviet Union, reportedly said "The more innocent they are, the more they deserve to die".

== References in literature ==
=== Darkness at Noon ===
Arthur Koestler's novel Darkness at Noon (1940) gives a haunting, if at least partly fictitious, portrayal of the atmosphere surrounding this trial. It tells of an old Bolshevik's last weeks trying to come to terms with the unintended results of the revolution he helped create. As a former member of the Communist party, Koestler rises above the dichotomy of much of the Cold War, showing a deep understanding for the origins of the Soviet Revolution, while at the same time severely criticizing its results.

=== Eastern Approaches ===
Fitzroy Maclean's autobiography Eastern Approaches has a chapter devoted to this trial, which he witnessed while working in Moscow for the British Foreign Office. He goes into great detail describing a number of the exchanges between the accused and the prosecutor. He also gives the history behind several of the people on trial, their service to the party and their positions before being tried.

=== A Russian Adventure ===
Halldór Laxness, the Icelandic author, was present at the trial and described it in detail in his travelogue from USSR in 1937–38, Gerska æfintýrið (The Russian Adventure), published in Iceland in 1938 and in a Danish translation in 1939. He seems to have believed in the guilt of the accused, but adds that it did not matter anyway: sacrifices have to be made to the cause of the revolution. In his 1963 memoirs, Skáldatími (A Poet's Time), Laxness returned to the trial, giving a totally different description of it, now much more sympathetic to Bukharin and his fellow defendants.
