= Pyotr Kryuchkov =

Soviet lawyer

- Пётр Крючков
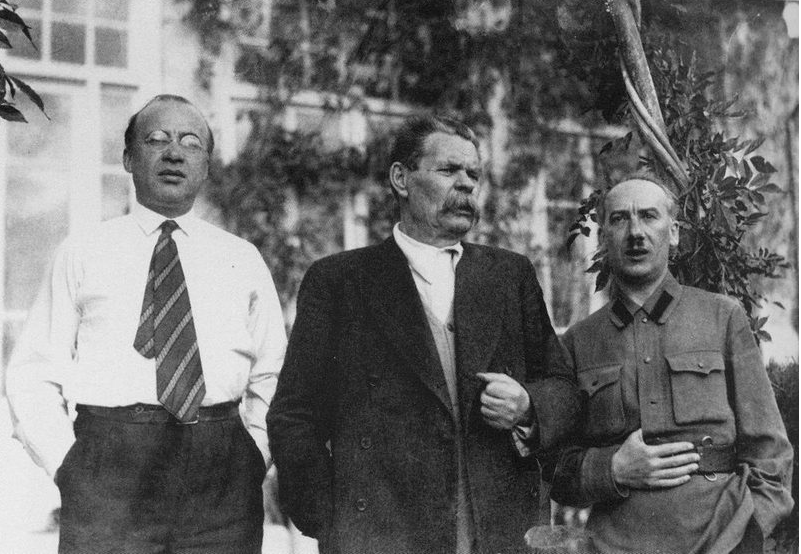
- From left to right: Kryuchkov, Maxim Gorky and Genrikh Yagoda
- Born: November 12, 1889; Perm, Russian Empire
- Died: March 15, 1938 (aged 48); Moscow, Soviet Union
- Cause of death: Executed
- Resting place: Kommunarka shooting ground
- Citizenship: Soviet
- Education: Saint Petersburg State University
- Known for: Secretary of Maxim Gorki
- Political party: CPSU

Pyotr Petrovich Kryuchkov (Russian: Пётр Петро́вич Крючко́в; 12 November 1889, Perm – 15 March 1938) was a Soviet lawyer and the secretary of Maxim Gorky.

== Career ==
Pyotr Kryuchkov was born in Perm and was the son of a leading vet and magistrate. He obtained a law degree at St Petersburg University. In 1916, he was hired as a secretary and personal assistant by the actress Maria Andreyeva, who had been Maxim Gorky's lover for more than a decade. When that relationship ended, she and Kryuchkov became lovers. She was then nearly 50 years old, he 20 years younger. The affair was short-lived, but through her, he met Gorky. Early in the 1920s, Kryuchkov was sent on a trade delegation to Berlin. Later he joined Gorky's extended household in Sorrento, Italy, where he assumed the role of the writer's secretary. The Old Bolshevik Yakov Hanecki attempted in 1928 to warn Gorky against employing him, to which the writer replied:

“P.P. Kryuchkov is an excellent worker, a good friend, and neither you nor anyone else can shake my trust and respect for him. I will add that your attacks against him have destroyed my companionship towards you."

He joined Gorky on a visit to the USSR in 1928, when they both met Genrikh Yagoda, the effective head of the OGPU. According to the testimony Kryuchkov gave at his trial, he and Yagoda "established a closer acquaintance" in 1931. From that time, he acted as an OGPU informant, while still employed by Gorky. He used his position to block attempts by people, such as Victor Serge and Alexander Voronsky, who had known Gorky in the past and were in trouble with the regime from appealing to him for help. Victor Serge remembered Kryuchkov as "a robust character with pince-nez, generally despised and singularly well-named." (In Russian, kryuchok крючок means a hook, and kryuchkotvor means is an insult directed at small-minded officials.) When Isaac Babel was under arrest, he told his interrogators: "Kryuchkov deliberately selected Gorky's visitors so that he did not see anyone apart from the Chekists of Yagoda's circle and charlatans." Moreover "whenever Gorky met Stalin or other members of the Politburo, Yagoda would visit Kryuchkov's flat afterward, demanding a full account of what had been said. He took to visiting public baths with Kryuchkov. One day in 1932, Yagoda handed his valuable spy $4,000 to buy a car."

Arrested late in 1937, Kryuchkov was one of the defendants of the Case of the Anti-Soviet "Bloc of Rights and Trotskyites" of 2–13 March 1938, during which he 'confessed' to murdering Gorky, and his son Maxim, on Yagoda's instructions. He and Yagoda were sentenced to death and executed by the NKVD.

On 12 March 1938 Kryuchkov's father, also named Pyotr Petrovich, was executed by the NKVD in Novosibirsk. Kryuchkov's wife, Elizabeta Zakharevna Kryuchkova, was arrested by the NKVD on 29 April 1937 and executed on 17 September 1938.
