= Mikhail Chernov (politician) =

Soviet politician (1891–1938)

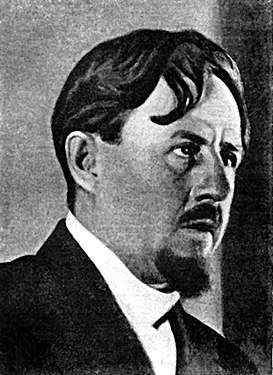
Mikhail Alexandrovich Chernov

Mikhail Alexandrovich Chernov (Russian: Михаи́л Александро́вич Черно́в; 20 November 1891 – 15 March 1938) was a Russian politician and Soviet statesman who was executed during the Great Purge.

He was born in Vichuga, now in Ivanovo Oblast, to a family of weavers of Russian ethnicity. In 1909 he became a Menshevik and graduated from the gymnasium in Kostroma in 1911. Between 1913 and 1917 he attended Moscow University, where he studied mathematics and physics. During this period he became friendly with Dmitri Furmanov. In 1914 his daughter was born in Ivanovo.

== Work in Ivanovo ==
- 1909 - a member of the Menshevik faction of the Russian Social Democratic Labour Party.
- 1916 - delivered workplaces courses with Furmanov
- 3 Jun, 1918 - organized by «the Committee on the Establishment of Ivanovo-Voznesensky Polytechnic Institute» (based evacuated Riga Polytechnic Institute). Mikhail Frunze appointed Chernov as secretary (managing director) of the committee.
- 1919 - Member RSDRP (internationalists).
- 1920 - Member of Russian Communist Party (Bolshevik).
- 1920 - Head of Ivanovo-Voznesensky provincial office of state.
- 1920–1921 - Head of Ivanovo-Voznesensky provincial department of public education.
- 8–16 March 1921 - Delegate Xth Congress Russian Communist Party (Bolshevik) (from Ivanovo-Voznesensky province, with the casting vote).
- 1921–1922 - Secretary of Ivanovo-Voznesensky province Committee Russian Communist Party (Bolshevik).
- 1922–1923 - chairman of the executive committee of Ivanovo-Voznesensky Province Council (Ispolkom).

== Work in Ukraine ==
- 1923–1925 - chairman of the executive committee of the Board of Donetsk Oblast.
- 1925–1928 - People's Commissioner of Internal Trade, the Ukrainian Soviet Socialist Republic
- 1928–1930 - member board of the People's Commissariat of Trade of the USSR
- 1929–1930 - Head of the department of fodder and garden inspections of the People's Commissariat of Trade of the USSR.
- 1930 - chairman of the association «Soyuzhleb».
- 1930–1932 - People's deputy commissioner supplies USSR.
- 1932 – April 1933 - Vice chairman of the Committee on Purchases in the Sovnarkom of the Soviet Union.
- April 1933 – April 1934 - Chairman of the committee on agricultural products in the Sovnarkom, the USSR (KomzagotSTO).
- 26 January – 10 February 1934 - Delegate of the 17th Congress of the All-Union Communist Party (b) (from KomzagotSTO, with a deliberative voice).
- 10 February 1934 – December 8, 1937 - Member of the Central Committee of the All-Union Communist Party (removed from the members of the Central Committee plenum of the Central Committee Decision MAC (b) survey on 4–8 December 1937).
- 10 April 1934 – 29 October 1937 - People's Commissar of Agriculture USSR.

"For years, his leadership Narkomzemom Union accounted for the main second five-year period, the task in the agricultural sector has been the strengthening of logistical base kolkhoz system. The results of M.I. Chernoff were visible on the basis of the second five-year plan. Gross charges of grain in 1937 amounted to 94.7 against 68.4 million tonnes in 1933 yield of 9.3 and 6.7, respectively, tonne / hectare. Agriculture has had some success in the production of leading industrial crops. Gross output of industrial crops collective farms in constant prices 1926-1927 city was 926.3, in 1935, 1213, 9, 1936 - 1440.1, and in 1937 - 1622.4 million rubles."(From Book VI Chernoivanova One and a half-century agrarian problems faced by the Agricultural authorities of Russia, 1837-2005, M. 2006).

== All-Union Agricultural Exhibition ==
- 17 Feb, 1935 - Report M. Chernoff «The work of the Commission on some charter Agriculture artel» II at the All-Union Congress of collective farmers, Udarnikov, in which he voiced a proposal to organize a commission in 1937 Vsesoyuznuyu agricultural exhibition. On the same day the ANC and TsK VKP (b) (signed by Molotov and Stalin) made a decision to organize the exhibition.
- 17 Aug., 1935 - Soviet Union for the ruling ANC, construction management and organization VSHV (future ENEA) established Exhibition Committee, chaired by approved by M. Black.
- 21 Apr, 1936 - decided SNK USSR «All-Union Agricultural Exhibition 1937» with the date of the exhibition opening on July 6, 1937, No organizational and political circumstances created so that the opening of the exhibition, first moved to 1938 and then to 1939

== Trial and rehabilitation ==
He was arrested on 7 November 1937, with his wife and family being arrested shortly later. He became one of the defendants in the Trial of the Twenty-One, the last of Stalin's purges. He was sentenced to be shot on 13 March 1938, and executed two days later. His daughter, Maria, was sentenced and executed on 21 April 1938. His son, Mikhail, died in 1942 in the Magadan Camp. He and his family were rehabilitated on 4 February 1988.

== Publications ==
- Trade USSR, Kharkiv, 1927.
- Hlebozagotovki to Ukraine in the year 1926/27, («Хлебозаготовки на Украине в 1926/27 году»)
- Hlebozagotovki USSR in the year 1927/28 Kharkiv, 1928. («Хлебозаготовки УССР в 1927/28 году»)
- Grain Trade of Ukraine («Хлебная торговля Украины».)
- Опыт трёх кампаний 1925/26 – 1927/28 гг., Харьков, 1928. Experience three campaigns 1925/26 - 1927/28 estimates., Kharkiv, 1928.
- Чернов М. А., «Хлебный рынок и его регулирование». Chernov MA, «Hlebny market and its regulation». Курс лекций, читанных на хлебных курсах при Наркомторге УССР. The course lectures, read cereal courses at Narkomtorge USSR. Харьков, «Пролетарий», 1928. Kharkiv, «proletarian», 1928.
- Чернов М. А., «Рабочий и хлебозаготовки», М.-Л., 1929. Chernov MA, «Work and hlebozagotovki», M.-L., 1929.
- Чернов М. А., «Крестьянство и хлебозаготовки», М., 1929. Chernov MA, «peasants and hlebozagotovki», M., 1929.
- Чернов М. А., «Борьба за хлеб», М. Госиздат РСФСР, 1930. Chernov MA, «The struggle for bread», M. Gosizdat RSFSR, 1930.
- Чернов М. А., «Общая инструкция об организации и деятельности Комиссии содействия хлебозаготовкам при сельских советах в кампанию 1930-31 г.», М., 1930. Chernov MA, «General Instruction of the organization and activities of the Commission hlebozagotovkam in the rural councils in the 1930-31 campaign city», M., 1930.
- Чернов М.А., «Потребительская кооперация должна быть готова к осенней сельскохозяйственной кампании», М., Центросоюз, 1930. Chernov MA, «consumer cooperation should be ready by the autumn agricultural campaign», M., Tsentrosoyuz, 1930.
- Чернов М. А., «Хлебозаготовки и кооперированные массы», М., Центросоюз, 1930. Chernov MA, «Hlebozagotovki and collaborate mass», M., Tsentrosoyuz, 1930.
- Чернов М. А., «Хлебозаготовки на 1930-1931 г.», М., 1930. Chernov MA, «Hlebozagotovki for 1930-1931 city», M., 1930.
- Чернов М. А., «Дружно выполним хлебозаготовки», М., 1930. Chernov MA, «Druzhno do hlebozagotovki», M., 1930.
- Чернов М. А., «Итоги хлебозаготовок», М.-Л., 1930. Chernov MA, «The outcome hlebozagotovok», M.-L., 1930.
- Чернов М. А., «Кооперация в борьбе за повышение реальной заработной платы рабочих», Харьков, 1930. Chernov MA, «Cooperation in the fight to raise real wages of working», Kharkiv, 1930.
- Чернов М. А. «Обеспечить бесперебойное снабжение сезонников и рабочих новостроек», М.-Л., 1931. Chernov MA «To ensure uninterrupted supply of new workers and sezonnikov», M.-L., 1931.
- Чернов М. А., «Уроки хлебозаготовок 1930 года и задачи на 1931 г.», М.-Л., 1931. Chernov MA, «Lessons hlebozagotovok 1930 and targets for 1931», M.-L., 1931.
- Чернов М. А., «Хлебозаготовительная кампания 1931 года», М., 1931. Chernov MA, «Hlebozagotovitelnaya campaign in 1931», M., 1931.
- Чернов М. А. «Новый урожай. Chernov MA «new harvest. Убрать вовремя, без потерь, дать в срок государству, правильно распределить» (беседы по текущей политике для сети комсомольской политучёбы), М., Партиздат, 1932. Remove the time, without loss in the period to give the State the right to distribute »(interviewed on the current policy for the network Komsomol politucheby), M. Partizdat, 1932.
- Чернов М.А., «Рабочее снабжение и советская торговля» (к итогам октябрьского пленума ЦК ВКП(б)), М.-Л., 1932. Chernov MA, «Workshop supply and Soviet trade» (to the outcome of the October plenum of the Central Committee of the WCP (b)), M.-L., 1932.
- Чернов М.А., «Выполним обязательства перед государством», М., Партиздат, 1933. Chernov MA, «abiding by the obligations to the state», M., Partizdat, 1933.
- Чернов М. А., «Хлебозаготовки 1933 года», М., Партиздат, 1933. Chernov MA, «Hlebozagotovki 1933», M., Partizdat, 1933.
- Чернов М. А. Калманович М. И. «О мероприятиях по укреплению и развитию животноводства» (доклады VII съезду Советов СССР 4 февраля 1935 г.), М., Партиздат, 1935. Chernov MA Kalmanovich MI «On measures to strengthen and develop livestock» (reports VII Congress Soviet 4 Feb, 1935), M. Partizdat, 1935.
- Чернов М. А. «О работе Комиссии 2-го Съезда колхозников-ударников по примерному уставу сельскохозяйственной артели» (доклад на съезде 17 февраля 1935 г.), М., 1935. Chernov MA «The work of the Commission on 2nd Congress of collective farmers, udarnikov for about charter Agriculture artel» (report to Congress on Feb. 17, 1935), M., 1935.
- Чернов М. А., «Закрепим победы социалистического хозяйства» (речи на Совещании передовиков урожайности по зерну, трактористов и машинистов молотилок с руководителями партии и правительства 27 и 29 декабря 1935 г.), М., Сельхозгиз, 1936. Chernov MA, «Hang victory of socialist economy» (speech at the meeting peredovikov yield of grain, tractor drivers and molotilok with the leaders of the party and government on 27 and 29 December 1935), M. Selhozgiz, 1936.
- Чернов М. А., «О введении правильных севооборотов» (доклад на июньском пленуме ЦК ВКП(б) 1937 г.), М., Партиздат, 1937. Chernov MA, «On the introduction of regular crop rotations» (report at the June plenary session of the Central Committee of the WCP (b) 1937), M. Partizdat, 1937.
