= Dmitry Pletnyov (doctor) =

Russian doctor (1871–1941)

- Дмитрий Дмитриевич Плетнёв
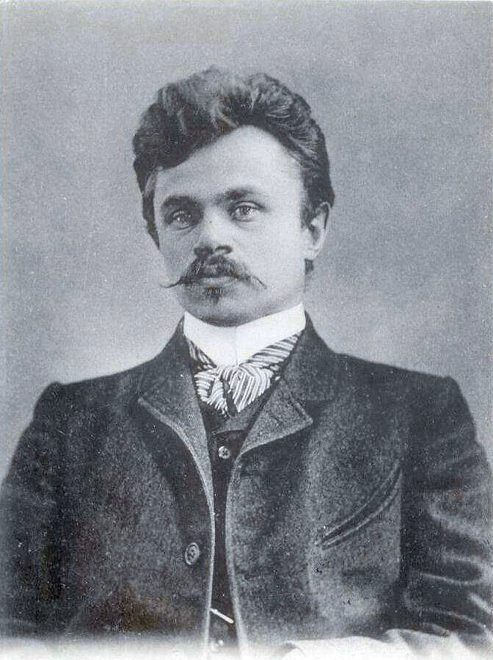
- Born: 25 November 1871 (N.S.); Kharkov Governorate, Russian Empire
- Died: 11 September 1941 (aged 69); Oryol, Russian SFSR, Soviet Union
- Cause of death: Medvedev Forest massacre
- Citizenship: Soviet
- Education: Imperial Moscow University
- Medical career
- Profession: Doctor
- Institutions: Clinic of Moscow State University
- Sub-specialties: Cardiology
- Research: Arrhythmia

Dmitry Dmitriyevich Pletnyov (Russian: Дми́трий Дми́триевич Плетнёв; 25 November [O.S. 13 November] 1871, Moskovsky Bobrik village, Kharkov guberniya – 11 September 1941, Medvedev forest near Oryol) was a Russian doctor, medical scientist and publicist. He defended his dissertation on cardiac arrhythmias in 1906. He was a member of the liberal Kadet party. He worked in the Moscow University and since 1929 led the therapeutic clinic of the Moscow oblast clinical institute. 1933–1937 he led the research institute of functional diagnostics and experimental therapy. His patients included Vladimir Lenin and his wife Nadezhda Krupskaya, Ivan Pavlov and other party and state leaders/figures of the USSR. Pletnyov is one of the founders of Russian cardiology. He often visited Western Europe and worked in the best clinics of Germany, Switzerland and France; he was fluent in many languages.

Pletnyov also clinically examined Soviet dictator Joseph Stalin and diagnosed him with "megalomania and a persecution complex" in 1937. This would be later followed by his arrest and eventual death in 1941.

In June 1937, Pravda published a slanderous article on the "professor-rapist and sadist" Pletnyov, after which he was imprisoned in Lubyanka and sentenced to two years in prison on probation by a case fabricated by the NKVD. In December 1937, Pletnyov was again arrested and in 1938 was a defendant on the process of the Anti-Soviet "Bloc of Rightists and Trotskyites", a show trial arranged by the NKVD. He had been severely tortured – which led to paralysis of half of his body – and deprived of sleep. Hence, he had to "admit" absurd charges such as having caused the death of Maxim Gorky by deliberately choosing "wrong methods of treatment", among others. In his cell, Pletnyov continued research through many books and monographs, of which most were in foreign languages. He was sentenced to 25 years' imprisonment and extrajudicially executed on 11 September 1941, in the Medvedev Forest massacre, along with 156 other prisoners, three months into the German invasion of the USSR.
