= Lev Levin =

Russian physician (1870-1938)

Lev Grigorevich Levin (Russian: Лев Григорьевич Левин), real name Usher Gershevich Leib Levin (Russian: Ушер-Лейб Гершевич Левин); 1870, Odessa — March 15, 1938, Moscow) was a physician, the doctor of medical sciences, professor, consultant medical and sanitary control of the Kremlin.

== Biography ==
Levin was a graduate of the natural separation of Physics and Mathematics Faculty of Odessa University and Medical Faculty of Moscow University (1896).

In 1896-1897 he trained in Berlin, and then - in various hospitals of Moscow in 1907–1919 years - a factory doctor, then a doctor-intern resort qualifying Hospital of People's Commissariat of the RSFSR, enlisted in the Red Army.

Since 1920 - doctor-ordinator, head of the therapy department in the Kremlin hospital. At the same time adviser Lechsanupra Kremlin and the medical unit of the NKVD of the USSR. He was the personal physician of Maxim Gorky, Vladimir Lenin, Felix Dzerzhinsky, Vyacheslav Molotov, Genrikh Yagoda, Vyacheslav Menzhinsky and many other leaders of the party and the government.

Since childhood, he was a close friend of the painter Leonid Pasternak, Moscow in years - a doctor throughout the Pasternak family.

== Arrest, trial and death ==
Levin was arrested on December 3, 1937. He was shot on March 15, 1938 by the verdict of the Military Collegium of the USSR Supreme Court on March 13 of that year as a member of the counter-revolutionary plot to eliminate the country's leadership.

== Family ==
- Wife - Maria Borisovna Levina
  - Son - Georgy Lvovich Levin (1900) was a doctor, an assistant professor of clinical nutrition of the Central Institute of Postgraduate Education, Candidate of Medical Sciences in 1949–1954 years in prison in connection with the Doctors' plot. Wife - Eva Lazarevna, was sent to Dzhambul.
  - Son - Vladimir Lvovich Levin (1903 - 1938) was a Professor of the Moscow Institute of Law, Assistant Head of the 2nd Division of the Western People's Commissariat of Foreign Affairs of the USSR. Shot on charges of involvement in the plot.
  - Daughter - Elena Lvovna Levina (1906) she was married to theater actor Leonid Leonidov.
    - Grandson - Soviet songwriter and pop administrator Pavel Leonidov.
  - Foster daughter - Dora Ovseevna Bronstein (1891-1970).
    - Grandson - documentary writer Aleksey Vysotsky.
      - Great-grandchildren - children's writer Irena Vysotskaya; rower and journalist Alexander Vysotsky.
    - Grandson - Semyon Vladimirovich Vysotsky (1916-1997), soldier (communicator), a colonel, a veteran of World War II.
      - Great grandson - an actor, author and performer of songs of Vladimir Vysotsky.
