= Prokopy Zubarev =

Soviet politician (1886–1938)

- Прокопий Зубарев
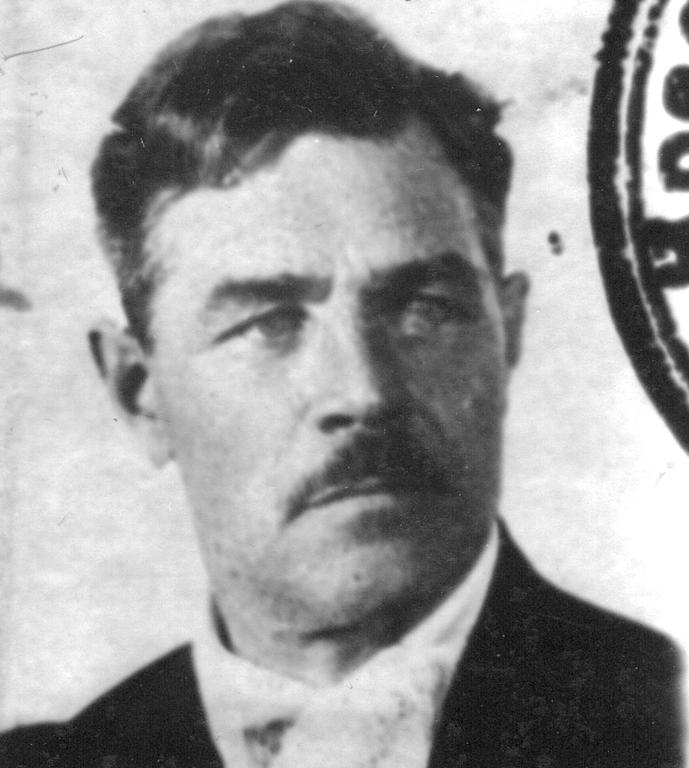

Deputy People's Commissar of Agriculture
- In office 1934 – March 1937

Personal details
- Born: February 1886
- Died: 15 March 1938 (aged 52) Moscow
- Cause of death: Execution
- Citizenship: Soviet
- Party: CPSU

Prokopy Timofeevich Zubarev (Russian: Проко́пий Тимофе́евич Зу́барев; February 1886 – 15 March 1938) was a Soviet politician and statesman. He was arrested, given a show trial, and executed as part of Stalin’s Great Purge.

== Biography ==
Zubarev was born in to a peasant family of Russian ethnicity and was a Bolshevik from 1904. From 1915 to 1917, he served in the Imperial Russian Army in World War I. He served in the Soviet of the Ufa Governorate in 1922. In 1929, he served in the Northern Krai Soviet.

Prokopy Zubarev was one of the defendants in the Case of the Anti-Soviet "Bloc of Rights and Trotskyites" of 2-13 March 1938. He was accused of disrupting the food supply and having been a member of the czarist secret police. On 13 March he was sentenced to death and was executed by NKVD firing squad two days later. He was rehabilitated in 1965.
