= Bubnov =

Bubnov (Russian: Бубнов) or Bubnow (Belarusian: Бубноў) is a Russian masculine surname that originates either from a verb bubnit' (to mumble) or from a verb bubenit' (to beat, to ring a bell). its feminine counterpart is Bubnova. The surname may refer to the following notable people:

- Aleksandr Bubnov (born 1955), Soviet and Russian football player, coach, analyst, commentator and businessman
- Alexander Bubnov, Russian painter
- Andrei Bubnov (1884–1938), Russian Bolshevik revolutionary
- Anton Bubnow (born 1988), Belarusian football player
- Grigory Bubnov, Russian writer
- Ivan Bubnov (1872–1919), Russian marine engineer
- Nicolai Mikhailovich Bubnov (1858–1943), Russian medievalist and linguist, whose specialist field was the medieval mathematics of Western Europe
- Varvara Bubnova (1886–1983), Russian painter, graphic artist and pedagogue
- Vladimir Bubnov (born 1940), Soviet and Russian football player and coach

== See also ==
- ru:Бубнов, a more extensive list in Russian Wikipedia
