= Beloborodov =

Beloborodov (Russian: Белобородов), or Beloborodova (Белобородова), is a Russian surname. Notable people with the surname include:

People

- Aleksandr Beloborodov (1891–1938), Bolshevik revolutionary and communist politician
- Afanasy Beloborodov (1903–1990), Soviet military commander and World War II general
