= Georgii Nadson =

Soviet biologist (1867–1939)

Georgii Adamovich Nadson (4 June [O.S. 23 May] 1867 – 15 April 1939) was a Soviet biologist, "one of the pioneers of radioecology in Russia" He became professor at St. Petersburg University in 1900. In 1930, he founded the Laboratory of Microbiology of the Russian Academy of Sciences (which in 1934 was transferred from Leningrad to Moscow and later transformed into the Institute of Microbiology). He was director of the institute until 1937, when he was "falsely accused of participating in so-called anti-Soviet sabotage and terrorism and arrested." On 14 April 1939 he was found guilty of participation in a terrorist organization, and on the next day he was shot and buried at the Kommunarka shooting ground. The real reason for his execution was his opposition to Lysenkoism.

Ulvella nadsonii, a species of algae, is named for him.
