= Sergey Chernykh =

Soviet military aviator (1912–41)

Sergey Aleksandrovich Chernykh
- Сергей Александрович Черных
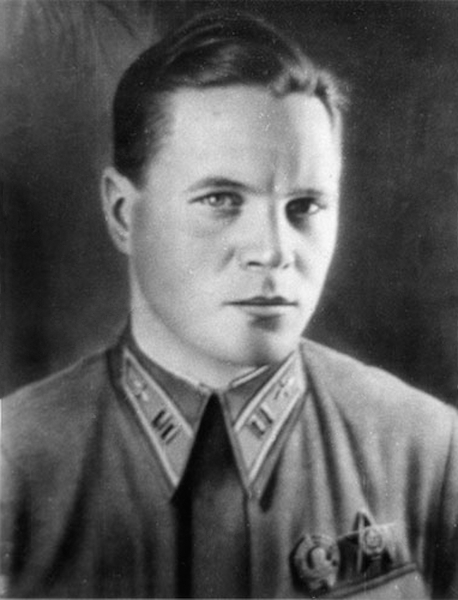
- Born: 22 February [O.S. 9 February] 1912; Nizhny Tagil, Perm Governorate, Russian Empire
- Died: 16 October 1941 (aged 29); Kommunarka shooting ground, Moscow, Soviet Union
- Military career
- Allegiance: Soviet Union
- Branch: Soviet Air Force
- Service years: 1930–1941
- Rank: Major-general
- Unit: 9th Mixed Aviation Division
- Conflicts: Spanish Civil War; World War II
- Awards: Hero of the Soviet Union

Sergey Aleksandrovich Chernykh (Russian: Сергей Александрович Черных; 22 February [O.S. 9 February] 1912 – 16 October 1941) was a Soviet fighter pilot in the Spanish Civil War who went on to become a Major-general and commander of the 9th Mixed Aviation Division while the Soviet Union was being invaded by Nazi Germany. After the unit under his command was devastated by Luftwaffe bombing attacks, he was arrested in Bryansk charged with criminal inaction, cowardice and failure to obey orders and executed at the Kommunarka shooting ground in October 1941. He was posthumously rehabilitated in 1958.

== Biography ==
Chernykh was born on 22 February 1912 in the city of Nizhny Tagil, then within the Russian Empire, to a working-class Russian family. After completing seven grades of school he worked as a mechanic at a local depot before he entered the Red Army in 1930 and was assigned a Komsomol travel ticket. In 1932 he became a member of the Communist party, and in 1933 he graduated from the Stalingrad Military Aviation School. Since December 1933 he served in the 107th Aviation Squadron of the Moscow Military District. He was promoted to the rank of Lieutenant in 1936 along with the position of flight commander. Starting in November that year he entered the Spanish civil war as a flight commander in a squadron of I-16 fighters. By the end of December that year he had shot down three enemy aircraft and become the first Soviet pilot to have downed a Bf 109. He returned to the Soviet Union in 1937, by then having accumulated 115 flight hours in combat and gained five individual and two shared aerial victories. On 31 December 1936 he was declared a Hero of the Soviet Union for his feats in Spain.

In May 1937 he was promoted to the rank of Senior Lieutenant and appointed as commander of an aviation detachment, and that same year became a squadron commander and was promoted to the rank of Major. In 1937 Sergey Chernykh was elected into the Supreme Soviet of the USSR. By early 1938 he was promoted again and was put in charge of the 83rd Aviation Brigade (Bryansk) as a colonel. In 1938 he was made deputy commander of the Air Force of the Special Red Banner Far Eastern Army, later 1st and 2nd Red Banner Army. At these positions Chernykh participated in the Battle of Lake Khasan. In 1940, after graduating from courses for improvement of command staff of the Air Force at the General Staff Academy, he took position of deputy commander of the Air Force of Odessa Military District, becoming kombrig. He continued to rise through the ranks of the Soviet Air Forces, and was eventually made commander of the 9th Combined Aviation Division, deployed at around Bialystok, one of the largest and best-equipped aviation units of Western Special Military District.

== World War II ==
On 22 June 1941, the first day of Operation Barbarossa, Luftwaffe bombers attacked the airfields Chernykh's division was stationed at. Despite making various attempts to resist the barrage of attacks, which included Major-general Chernykh joining the survivors of his men in flying the few usable fighters left, he was still charged with criminal inaction and cowardice later in; such charges were pressed despite the fact that the 9th Division had lost contact with headquarters during the surprise attacks, was short of desperately-needed fuel, and few pilots in the division were trained to fly the new aircraft they had just received. The 9th Mixed Aviation Division had lost 347 of its 409 aircraft, including the most if its 57 MiG-3 and 52 I-16 of 129th Fighter Regiment. On 28 June 1941 Chernykh had mistaken several Soviet aircraft landing on the Sescha airfield for an incoming Nazi airborne assault, ordered destruction of airfield equipment and left the airfield to report the situation to headquarters. Chernykh was later arrested for "unauthorized retreat" on 8 July 1941; subsequently, he was tried by a military tribunal and sentenced to death on 28 July 1941. He was executed at the Kommunarka shooting ground on 16 October 1941 along with many other Soviet military commanders who were blamed for Soviet failure to repel the unexpected German invasion. On 5 August 1958, he was posthumously rehabilitated by the Military Collegium of the Supreme Court of the Soviet Union.
