= Genrikh Yagoda =

Soviet secret police official (1891–1938)

- Генрих Ягода
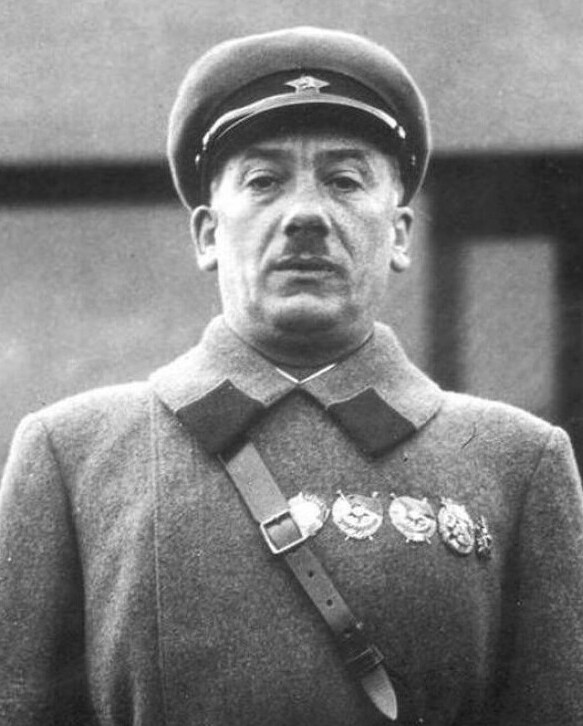
- Yagoda in 1936

People's Commissar for Communications
- In office 26 September 1936 – 5 April 1937
- Premier: Vyacheslav Molotov
- Preceded by: Alexei Rykov
- Succeeded by: Innokenti Khalepski

People's Commissar for Internal Affairs
- In office 10 July 1934 – 26 September 1936
- Premier: Vyacheslav Molotov
- Preceded by: Himself (as OGPU chairman)
- Succeeded by: Nikolai Yezhov (NKVD); Yakov Agranov (GUGB)

Chairman of the OGPU
- In office 10 May 1934 – 10 July 1934
- Preceded by: Vyacheslav Menzhinsky
- Succeeded by: Office abolished

Personal details
- Born: Yenokh Gershevich Iyeguda; 7 November 1891 Rybinsk, Russian Empire
- Died: 15 March 1938 (aged 46) Moscow, Russian SFSR, Soviet Union
- Cause of death: Execution by shooting
- Party: All-Union Communist Party (Bolsheviks) (1917–1937)
- Other political affiliations: Russian Social Democratic Labour Party (1907–1917)
- Spouse: Ida Averbakh (m. 1914)

Military service
- Allegiance: Russian Empire (1915–1916); Russian Soviet Federative Socialist Republic (1918–1922); Soviet Union (1922–1936)
- Branch/service: Imperial Russian Army; Red Army; Cheka; GPU; OGPU; GUGB; NKVD
- Years of service: 1915–1916; 1918–1936
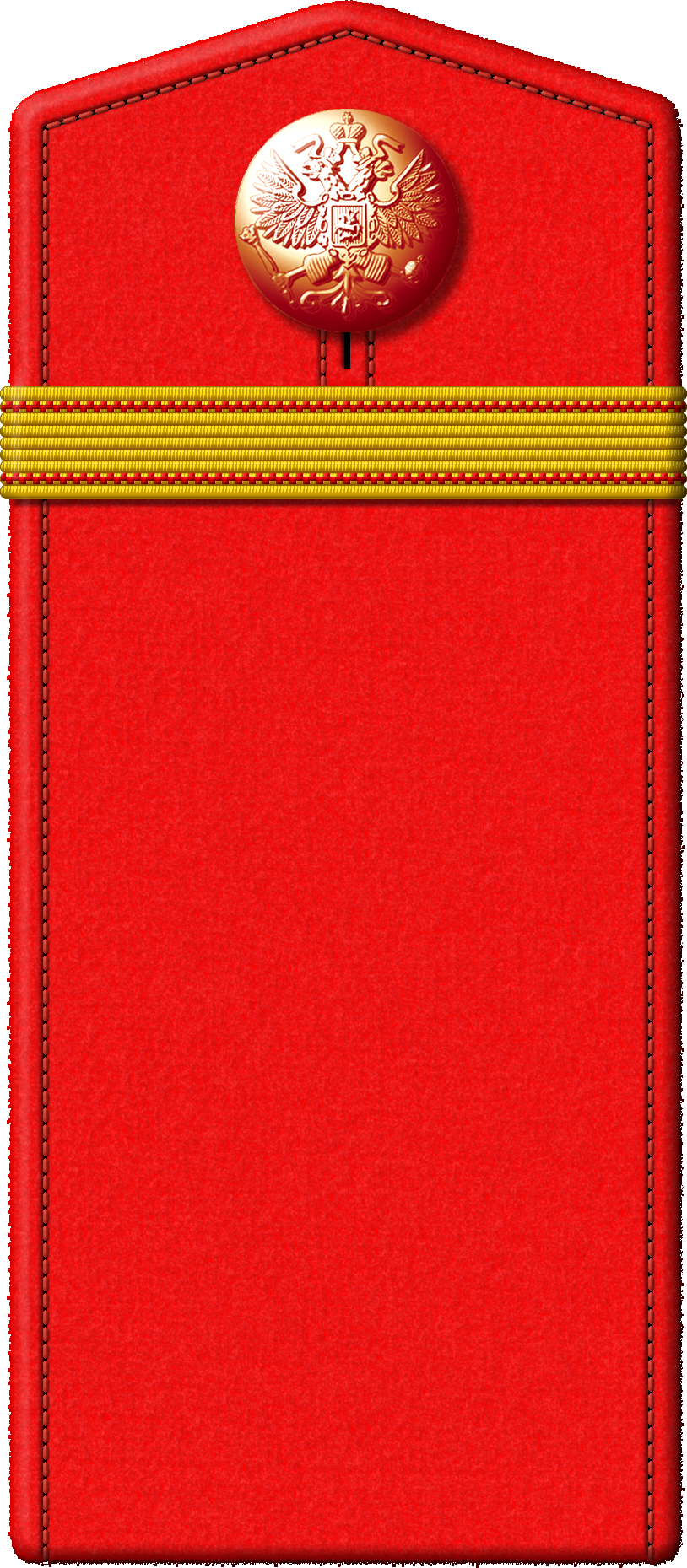
- Rank: Corporal (1915–1916) Commissioner General of State Security (1934–1936)
- Battles/wars: World War I

Genrikh Grigoryevich Yagoda (Russian: Ге́нрих Григо́рьевич Яго́да, romanized: Genrikh Grigor'yevich Yagoda, born Yenokh Gershevich Iyeguda; 7 November 1891 – 15 March 1938) was a Soviet secret police official who served as director of the NKVD, the Soviet Union's security and intelligence agency, from 1934 to 1936. Appointed by Joseph Stalin, Yagoda supervised arrests, show trials, and executions of the Old Bolsheviks Lev Kamenev and Grigory Zinoviev, climactic events of the Great Purge. Yagoda also supervised the construction of the White Sea–Baltic Canal with Naftaly Frenkel, using penal labor from the gulag system, during which 12,000–25,000 laborers died.

Like many NKVD officers who oversaw political repression under Stalin's rule, Yagoda himself ultimately became a victim of the regime's purges. He was demoted from the directorship of the NKVD in favor of Nikolai Yezhov in 1936 and arrested in 1937. Charged with crimes of wrecking, espionage, Trotskyism and conspiracy, Yagoda was a defendant at the Trial of the Twenty-One, the last of the major Soviet show trials of the 1930s. Following his confession at the trial, Yagoda was found guilty and shot.

== Early life ==
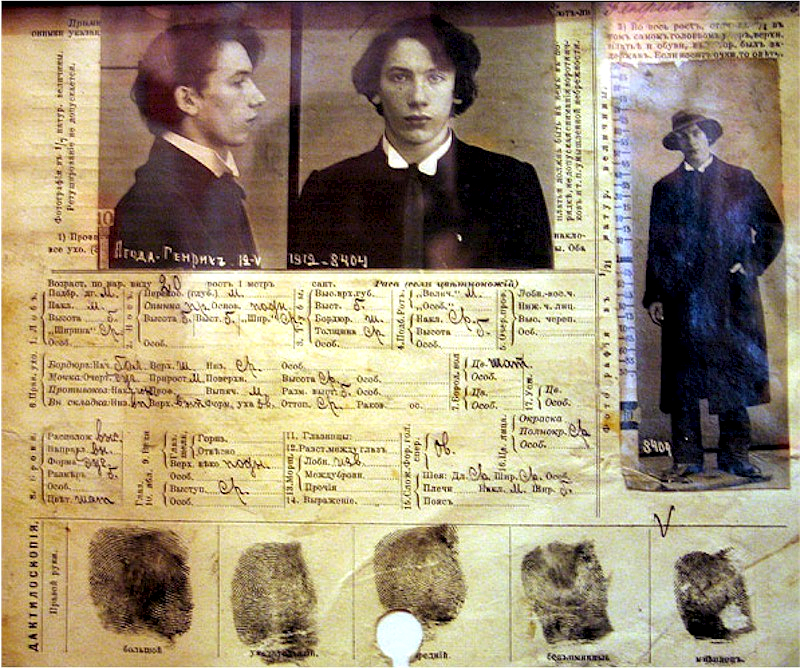
Yagoda on a police information card from 1912

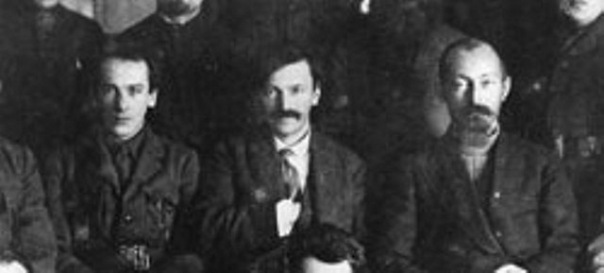
Yagoda, Menzhinsky, Dzerzhinsky, 1920

Yagoda was born in Rybinsk into a Jewish family. The son of a jeweller, he trained as a statistician and worked as a pharmacist's assistant. Yagoda claimed that he was an active revolutionary from the age of 14, when he worked as a compositor on an underground printing press in Nizhny Novgorod, and that at the age of 15, he was a member of a fighting squad in the Sormovo district of Nizhny Novgorod during the violent suppression of the 1905 revolution. He said he joined the Bolsheviks in Nizhny Novgorod at the age of 16 or 17 and was arrested and sent into exile in 1911. In 1913, he moved to St. Petersburg to work at the Putilov steel works. After the outbreak of war in 1914, he joined the army, and was wounded in action.

There is another version of his early career, told in the memoirs of the former NKVD officer Aleksandr M. Orlov, who alleged that Yagoda invented his early revolutionary career and did not join the Bolsheviks until 1917, and that his deputy Mikhail Trilisser was dismissed from service for trying to expose the lie.

== Political career ==
After the October Revolution of 1917, Yagoda rose rapidly through the ranks of the Cheka and the GPU (the predecessors of the OGPU and NKVD) to become the second deputy of Felix Dzerzhinsky, the head of the GPU, in September 1923. After Dzerzhinsky's appointment as chairman of the Supreme Council of National Economy in January 1924, Yagoda became the deputy chief of the Joint State Political Directorate (OGPU), and within a few years the real head of the OGPU as the chairman Vyacheslav Menzhinsky had little authority by the late 1920s because of his serious prolonged illness. In 1924, Yagoda joined the USSR's head of government, Alexei Rykov, on a ship tour of the Volga. An American journalist who was allowed to join them on the trip described Yagoda as "a spare, slightly-tanned, trim looking, youngish officer" adding that it was "difficult to associate terror with the affable and modest person". By contrast, the chemist Vladimir Ipatieff met Yagoda briefly in Moscow in 1918 and later recorded that he had thought that "it was unusual for a young man in his early twenties to be so unpleasant. I felt then that it would be unlucky for me or anyone else ever to fall into his hands." When he saw him again in 1927, "his appearance had changed considerably: he had grown fatter and looked much older and very dignified and important."

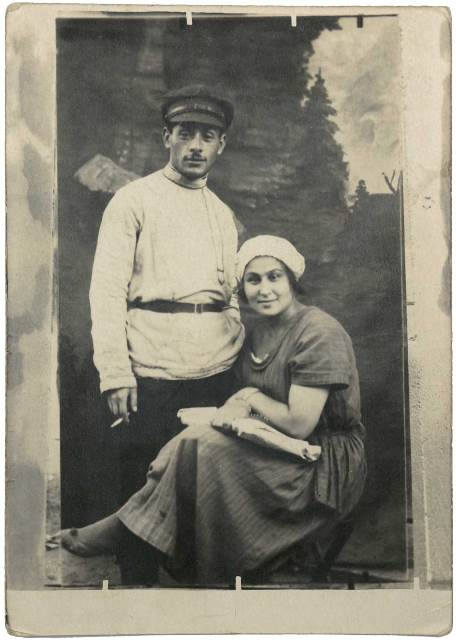
Yagoda and his wife Ida Averbakh, deputy prosecutor of Moscow, 30 September 1922

Though Yagoda appears to have known Joseph Stalin since 1918, when they were both stationed in Tsaritsyn during the civil war, "he was never Stalin's man". When Stalin ordered that the Soviet Union's entire rural population were to be forced onto collective farms, Yagoda is reputed to have sympathised with Bukharin and Rykov, his opponents on the right of the communist party. Nikolai Bukharin claimed in a leaked private conversation in July 1928 that "Yagoda and Trilisser are with us", but once it became apparent that the right was losing the power struggle, Yagoda switched allegiance. In the contemptuous opinion of Bukharin's widow, Anna Larina, Yagoda "traded his personal views for the sake of his career" and degenerated into a "criminal" and a "miserable coward".

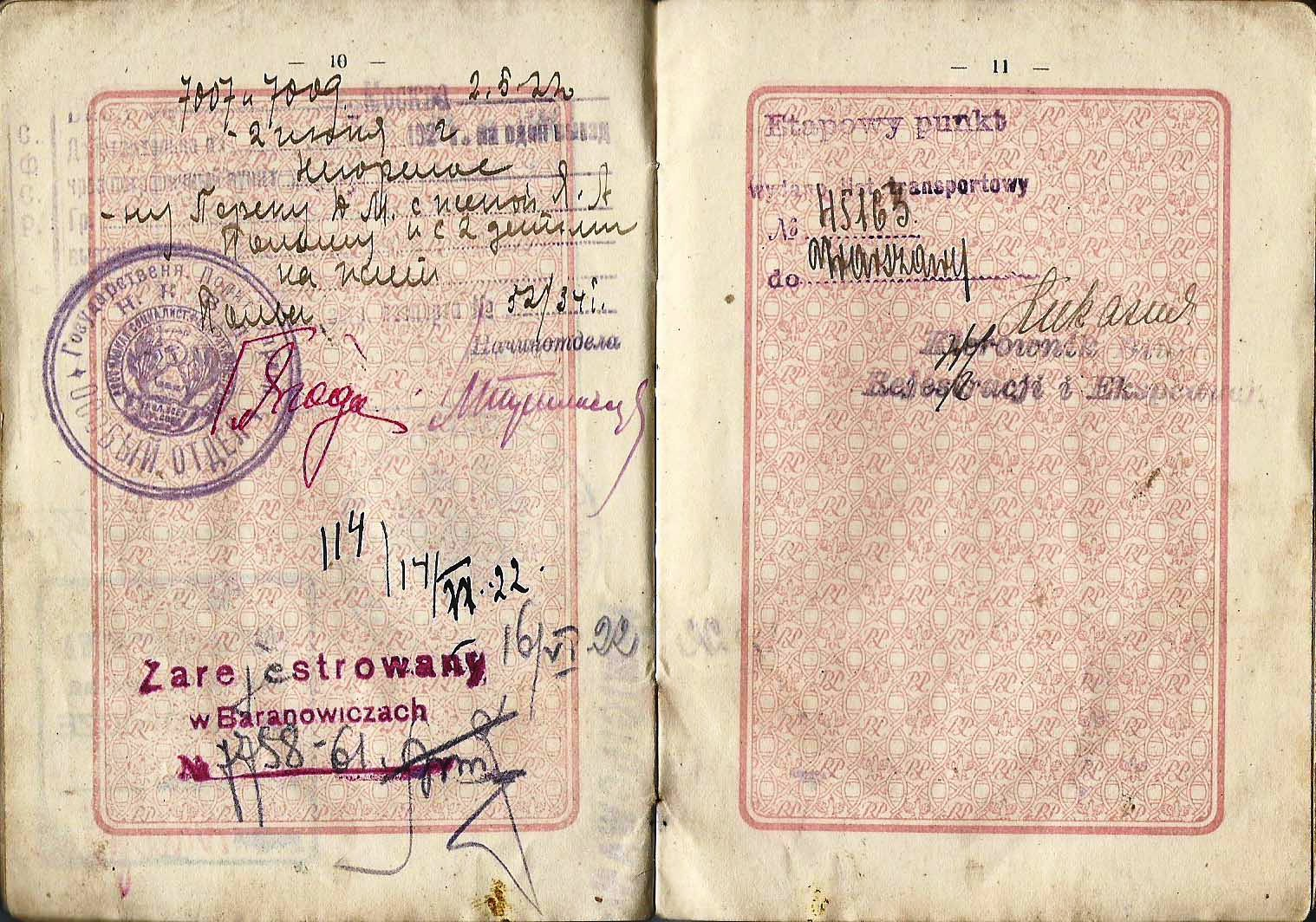
1922 exit visa hand signed by Yagoda in Moscow

Yagoda continued to be an effective head of the OGPU until July 1931, when the Old Bolshevik Ivan Akulov was appointed First Deputy Chairman, and Yagoda was demoted to the post of Second Deputy. Akulov was dismissed and Yagoda reinstated in October 1932, After Yagoda's fall, one of his former colleagues confessed: "We met Akulov with violent hostility ... the entire party organisation in the OGPU was devoted to sabotaging Akulov." Stalin must have agreed to his reinstatement with ill grace, because four years later he accused the OGPU/NKVD of being four years behind in rooting out the Trotskyite-Zinovievite bloc, although Yagoda had been complicit in the execution of one of Trotsky's sympathisers, Yakov Blumkin, and in sending others to the Gulag, the system of forced labour created under his supervision.

Prior to 1929, the only labor camp in the USSR was the Solovki Special Purpose Camp, which fell under the purview of the OGPU. As deputy head of the OGPU, Yagoda organized construction of the White Sea–Baltic Canal using forced labor at breakneck speed between 1931 and 1933, though at the cost of huge casualties. The construction of the Moscow–Volga Canal was started under his watch, but completed only after his fall by his successor Nikolai Yezhov. For his contribution to the Baltic canal's construction, he was later awarded the Order of Lenin. Yagoda greatly expanded the use of prison labor to assist with the building of the Berezniki Works chemical plant and other projects. From 1929 to 1930, the number of prison laborers in OGPU camps expanded from 22,848 to 155,000, and after November 1930 became known as the Main Camp Administration, or GULAG system.

Yagoda had founded a secret poison laboratory of OGPU that was at Stalin's disposal. It was later alleged during the later show-trial of Yagoda that his former NKVD boss, Vyacheslav Menzhinsky, was slowly poisoned during two weeks by two assistants of Yagoda. However, Menzhinsky was ill for several years before he died; this may have been a false testimony. Menhzinsky's death was followed one day later by the death of Max Peshkov, the son of Maxim Gorky, the doyen of Soviet literature. Yagoda had been cultivating Gorky as a potentially useful contact since 1928 and employed Gorky's secretary, Pyotr Kryuchkov, as a spy. "Whenever Gorky met Stalin or other members of the Politburo, Yagoda would visit Kryuchkov's flat afterward, demanding a full account of what had been said. He took to visiting public baths with Kryuchkov. One day in 1932, Yagoda handed his valuable spy $4,000 to buy a car." He had developed an obsession with Max Peshkov's wife, Timosha, and visited her daily when she was newly widowed, though her mother denied that they were ever lovers. According to Arkady Vaksberg and other researchers, Yagoda poisoned Maxim Gorky and his son on the orders of Joseph Stalin.

=== NKVD Chief ===
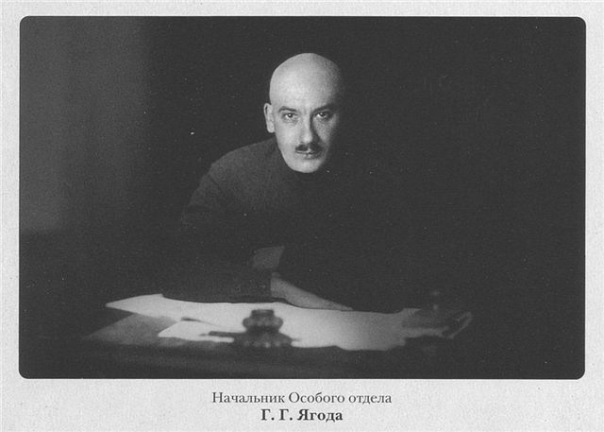
Yagoda at his desk in 1930

On 10 July 1934, two months after Menzhinsky's death, Joseph Stalin appointed Yagoda People's Commissar for Internal Affairs, a position that included oversight of both the regular and the secret police, the NKVD. He was in charge of investigating the Kirov assassination. At some point, it was discovered by the NKVD that a conspiratorial Opposition Bloc had been formed in 1932, by Leon Trotsky and various other Soviet politicians like Lev Kamenev and Grigory Zinoviev. Yagoda then worked closely with Andrei Vyshinsky in organizing the first Moscow Show Trial, which resulted in prosecution and subsequent execution of Zinoviev and Kamenev in August 1936, beginning the Great Purge.

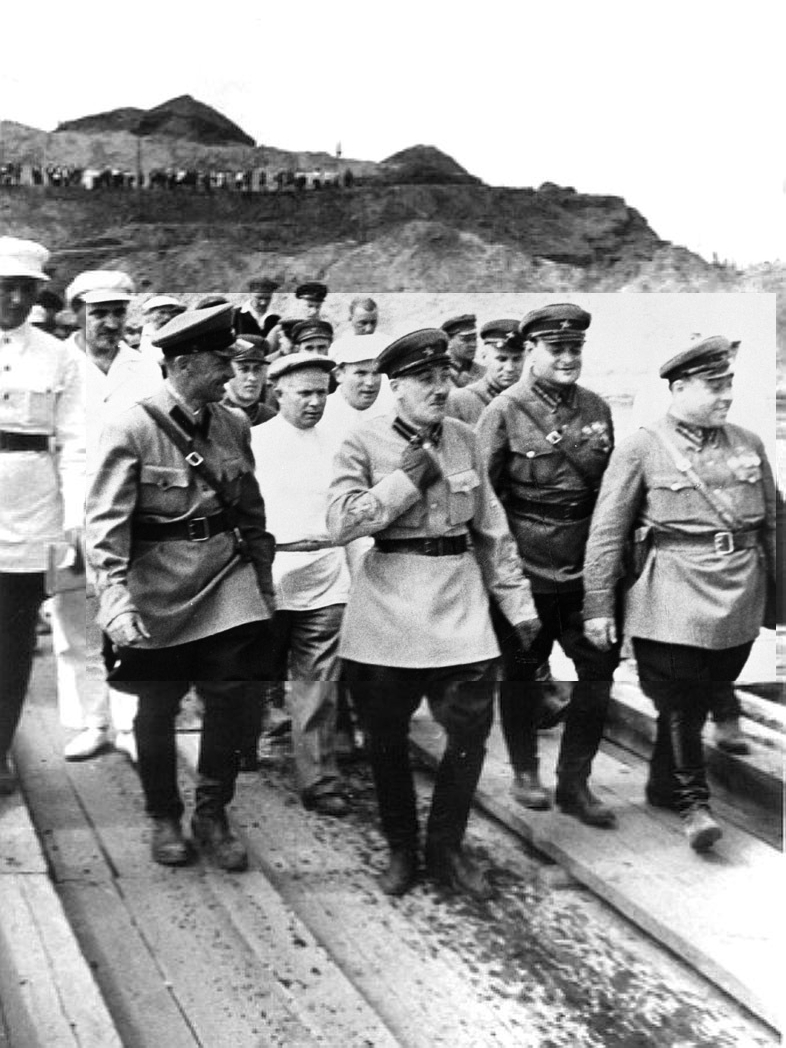
Yagoda (middle) inspecting the construction of the Moscow–Volga canal. Behind him is Nikita Khrushchev.

The Red Army high command was not spared and its ranks were thinned by Yagoda, as a precursor to the later and more extensive purge in the Soviet military. More than a quarter of a million people were arrested during the 1934–1935 period; the GULAG system was vastly expanded under his stewardship, and penal labor became a major developmental resource in the Soviet economy.

Stalin became increasingly disillusioned with Yagoda's performance. In the middle of 1936, Stalin received a report from Yagoda detailing the unfavorable public reaction abroad to the show trials and the growing sympathy among the Soviet population for the executed defendants. The report enraged Stalin, interpreting it as Yagoda's advice to stop the show trials and in particular to abandon the planned purge of Mikhail Tukhachevsky, Marshal of the Soviet Union and the former commander in chief of the Red Army. Stalin was already unhappy with Yagoda's services, mostly due to mismanagement of Kirov's assassination and his failure to fabricate "proofs" of ties between Kamenev and Zinoviev and the Okhrana (the tsarist security organization). As one Soviet official put it, "The Boss forgets nothing."

On August 22, Mikhail Tomsky committed suicide after learning that he would be charged with counterrevolution. Before committing suicide, he told his wife to tell the investigators that it was Yagoda who drove him to the path of opposition, which was later found by Yezhov. Another possible reason Stalin did not trust Yagoda was his failure to report the existence of the Bloc of Oppositions earlier. On 25 September 1936, Stalin sent a telegram (co-signed by Andrei Zhdanov) to the members of the Politburo. The telegram read:

"We consider it absolutely necessary and urgent that Comrade Yezhov be appointed to head the People's Commissariat of Internal Affairs. Yagoda has obviously proved unequal to the task of exposing the Trotskyite–Zinovievite bloc. The OGPU was four years late in this matter. All party heads and most of the NKVD agents in the region are talking about this."

A day later, he was replaced by Nikolai Yezhov. There are two theories as to why Yagoda did not report on the bloc earlier. He may have found out about it only in 1936, or he knew about its activities for some time but covered it up because of his sympathies to the opposition. According to the anti-communist soviet defector Grigori Tokaev, who was an underground participant in an oppositional group, the opposition was working with parts of the police and Yagoda himself:

He [Yagoda] was removed from the NKVD, and we lost a strong link in our opposition intelligence service. ... The NKVD, now headed by Yezhov, took another step forward. The Little Politbureau had penetrated the Yenukidze–Sheboldayev and the Yagoda–Zelinsky conspiracies and broken through the opposition's links within the central institutions of the political police.

Yagoda was demoted to the post of People's Commissar for Communications of the USSR.

=== Arrest, trial and execution ===
In March 1937, Yagoda was arrested on Stalin's orders. Yezhov announced Yagoda's arrest for diamond smuggling, corruption and working as a German agent since joining the party in 1917. Yezhov even blamed Yagoda for an attempt to assassinate him by sprinkling mercury around his office. He was accused of poisoning Maxim Gorky and his son. It was discovered that Yagoda's two Moscow apartments and his dacha contained, besides a large collection of female clothing and apparel, 3,904 pornographic photos, 11 pornographic films, 165 pornographically carved pipes and cigarette holders, the two bullets that killed Zinoviev and Kamenev and 549 books—some of which were Trotskyist works.

Yagoda was found guilty of treason and conspiracy against the Soviet government at the Trial of the Twenty-One in March 1938. He denied he was a spy, but admitted most other charges.

Yagoda was summarily shot after the trial. During the execution, Yagoda and Bukharin were seated on chairs and forced to watch the execution of others sentenced to death; they were last to be shot. Before the execution Yagoda was also beaten by Izrail Dagin by the order of Yezhov. In 1988, on the 50th anniversary of the trial, the Soviet authorities belatedly cleared all of the other 20 defendants of any criminal offence, admitting that the entire trial was built on false confessions. Yagoda was the only defendant not to be posthumously rehabilitated.

=== Family ===
Yagoda's father, Grigori, the jeweller, who was aged 78 in 1938, wrote directly to Stalin disowning "our only surviving son" because of "his grave crimes". This contrition was not enough to save him, or his wife, from being arrested and dying in labour camps. He had two brothers. One was killed during the suppression of the revolt in Sormovo in 1905; the other was shot for taking part in a mutiny in a regiment during the war with Germany. Their sister, Lilya, was arrested on 7 May 1937, and shot on 16 July. She was photographed before her execution, as was normal for condemned prisoners. That photograph was retrieved from KGB archives and published in the book Ordinary Citizens by David King.

Yagoda's wife was Ida Averbakh (Russian Wikipedia), one of whose uncles, Yakov Sverdlov, was a prominent Bolshevik, and another, Zinovy Peshkov, was the adopted son of the writer Maxim Gorky. She was shot on 16 July 1938. Her brother, Leopold Averbakh, was shot in August 1937. Their father was also shot.

== Honours and awards ==
- Order of Lenin
- Order of the Red Banner, twice (1927, 1930)
- Order of the Red Banner of Labour of the RSFSR (1932)

== See also ==
- Outline of the Russian Revolution and Civil War
- Bibliography of the Russian Revolution and Civil War
- Bibliography of Stalinism and the Soviet Union
- Index of Old Bolsheviks
- Index of articles related to the Russian Revolution and Civil War

== Bibliography ==
- Kotkin, Stephen (2014). Stalin: Volume I: Paradoxes of Power, 1878–1928. Penguin Publishing Group. ISBN 978-0-698-17010-0.
- Kotkin, Stephen (2017). Stalin. (Vol. 2). Waiting for Hitler, 1928–1941. Penguin.
- Montefiore, Simon Sebag (2007). Stalin: The Court of the Red Tsar. Knopf Doubleday Publishing Group. ISBN 978-0-307-42793-9.
- Rayfield, Donald: Stalin und seine Henker. 2004
- Runes, Dagobert D.: Despotism, a Pictorial History of Tyranny. Philosophical Library 1963
- Н. В. Петров, К. В. Скоркин (N. W. Petrow, K.W. Skorkin): Кто руководил НКВД, 1934–1941 – Справочник. (Wer hatte die Regie im NKWD, 1934 bis 1941 – Verzeichnis); Swenja-Verlag 1999, ISBN 5-7870-0032-3 online
- А.Л. Литвин (A. L. Litwin): От анархо-коммунизма к ГУЛАГу: к биографии Генриха Ягоды (Über den Anarchokommunismus im Gulag: Mit einer Biografie von Genrich Jagoda) in 1917 год в судьбах России и мира. Октябрьская революция. (Das Jahr 1917 und die Schicksale Russlands und der Welt) S. 299–314, Institut für russische Geschichte РАН, Moskau 1998, ISBN 5805500078.
