= Tsarist officers in the Red Army =

Group of Bolshevik officers in the Russian Civil War

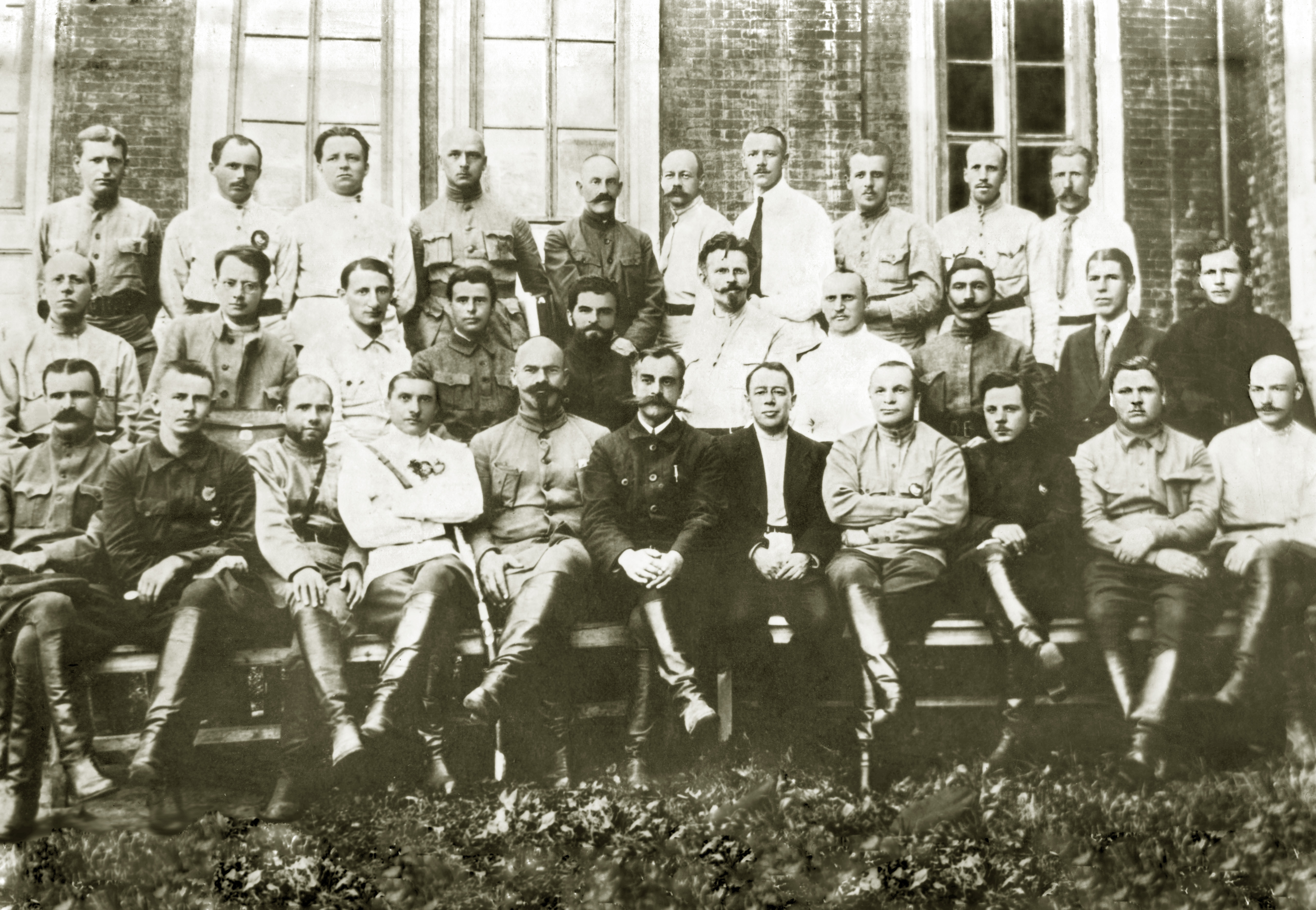
Upper row, left to right: 3. Romuald Muklevich, 4. Jānis Pauka, 5. Nikolai Sollogub, 6. Vilhelm Garf, 7. V. L. Baranovsky, 9. P. M. Oshley. Middle row: 2. Ieronim Uborevich, 3. David Petrovsky, 4. Iona Yakir, 5. Pavel Lebedev, 6. Stepan Danilov 7. Nikolai Petin, 8. Semyon Budyonny, 9. Boris Shaposhnikov, 10. Pavel Postyshev. Bottom row: 1. Vasily Shorin, 2. August Kork, 4. Vladimir Lazarevich, 5. Nikolai Muralov, 6. Sergey Kamenev, 7. Sergei Gusev, 8. Alexander Yegorov, 9. Kliment Voroshilov, 10. Dmitry Oskin. Date: 13 August 1921

During the Russian Civil War of 1917–1923, a number of former Tsarist officers joined the Red Army, either voluntarily or as a result of coercion. This list includes officers of the Imperial Russian Army commissioned before 1917 who joined the Bolsheviks as commanders or as military specialists.

== Overview ==
Following the Russian Revolution in 1917, the ruling communist Bolsheviks, in the fashion of most traditional Marxists, hoped to disband the standing Imperial Russian Army of the deposed Tsardom and replace it with a militia system. The outbreak of civil war led them to opt for a regular military in 1918 and they created the Red Army to oppose the anti-revolutionary White movement. The pre-existing army had a 250,000-strong officer corps. Of these, 75,000 were inducted into the Red Army, most of them being drafted and many not supportive of the Bolsheviks' political agenda. However, a large number joined out of a desire to maintain Russian territorial integrity (they believed that only the Bolsheviks could govern effectively) and to curb foreign influence in the country (the White leadership had promised foreign governments special privileges under their rule in exchange for support). As such, the overwhelming majority of the officers in the Red Army had formerly served in the Imperial military, much to the chagrin of Bolshevik leaders who were anxious to assert their authority over the armed forces. They were forced to rely on the ex-Tsarist officers, dubbed "military specialists" (Russian: военспец, romanized: "voyenspets"), due to a deficit of trained commanders among the revolutionaries. Throughout the war the Red Army's command staff, the Stavka, was dominated by Tsarist officers. In spite of his colleagues' wariness, Vladimir Lenin praised them for their contributions to the Bolshevik war effort:

"You have heard about the series of the brilliant victories won by the Red Army. There are tens of thousands of old colonels and other officers in its ranks. If we had not taken them into service and made them work for us, we could not have created the Army...only with their help was the Red Army able to win the victories that it did."

Immediately following the conflict the former Tsarists made up the majority of the General Staff Academy's faculty and constituted over 90 percent of all instructional and administrative staff at military schools. The Stavka was organised in a manner very similar to its Tsarist predecessor, and much of the military curriculum was copied from the Imperial General Staff Academy.

The Bolsheviks reformed the Red Army in the mid-1920s. In an attempt to reduce the reliance on the mistrusted ex-Tsarists they reduced the officer corps and educated new cadets. Leon Trotsky's removal from the Commissariat of Defence was in part driven by his perceived over-reliance on Tsarist officers. His replacement, Mikhail Frunze, further decreased their number in army. By 1930, ex-Tsarists made up only about 10 percent of the officer corps.

== Flag officers ==
- Vasili Altfater - Rear Admiral in the Imperial Navy, joined the Bolsheviks from the beginning of the October Revolution, became first Commander-in-Chief of the Soviet Navy.
- Leonid Artamonov - General, military engineer and explorer of Africa. In 1897-98 he was military adviser to Emperor Menelik II of Ethiopia. From 1911 until 1914 he was the commander of the First Russian Army Corps, relieved of his duties after the Battle of Tannenberg. After 1917, he continued his scientific, engineering and military activity for the Soviet government. In 1927, he was the expert of the Moscow city government. The state gave him an honorable pension. He preferred to live in Leningrad, there he died in 1932.
- Andrejs Auzāns - The highest-ranking Latvian officer of the Imperial Army, major general and commander of the Latvian Riflemen during the legendary Christmas Battles of 1916. In 1917 he became Chief of the Russian General Staff Topographical Section and he kept this position in the Red Army until 1920. Auzāns returned to Latvia in 1923 and served as a general in the Latvian Army. After the occupation of Latvia in 1940 he did not collaborate with the Nazis or the Soviets. In 1944 he was allowed to emigrate and he died in Stockport, England in 1953.
- Dmitry Bagration - A descendant of the Georgian royal family and of Prince Pyotr Bagration. During World War I, he was appointed commander of the 1st Brigade of the Savage Division in 1914. He was twice an acting commander of the division and became a lieutenant-general in 1916. After the fall of the Russian monarchy in the February Revolution, Bagration played a role in the Kornilov affair in August 1917, in which he stepped back from supporting General Aleksandr Krymov's planned march against the Russian Provisional Government in Petrograd. Under the Soviet regime, he joined the Red Army in December 1918. In 1919, he directed the High Cavalry School and took part in organizing cavalry units of the Red Army. He died the same year and was buried at the Alexander Nevsky Lavra.
- Aleksei Baiov - Major-general from 1911. He joined the Red Army in the first two years of the Revolution, then defected to the Whites, and after 1920 he served in the Estonian Army.
- Pyotr Baluyev - General in the Imperial Russian Army, commanding the Southwestern Front from 24 July 1917 to 31 July 1917. He became an inspector and an instructor in the Red Army under Bolshevik command after the Russian Revolution of 1917.
- Vasily Boldyrev - Lieutenant-General, veteran of the Russo-Japanese War, in World War I he commanded the 5th Army. He first joined Kolchak's army and government in the Far East and stayed in Vladivostok, and after the capture of the city by the Red Army on 5 November 1922 he was arrested. In prison, he declared his willingness to serve the Soviet government. In the summer of 1923 he was released. After that, he became a teacher and a research assistant at the West-Siberian Institute of Industrial Economic Research.
- Aleksei Brusilov - Led Russian cavalry during Russo-Japanese War, and launched the successful Brusilov Offensive of 1916. Joined the Red Army in 1920 and died in 1926.
  - Brusilov's son, a cavalry lieutenant, joined the Red Army in 1917, but was killed by White Army counterrevolutionaries early in Russia's civil war.
- Mikhail Dmitrievich Bonch-Bruevich - Promoted to major general in Imperial Russian army August 1917. Lieutenant general in the Red Army 1944–45.
- Nikolai Danilov - Lieutenant-general in 1911, corps and army commander in World War I. After the October Revolution, he entered the service of the Soviet Red Army.
- Yuri Danilov - General in charge of the Military Intelligence section of the Imperial Army and Quartermaster-General at the Stavka in World War I. In early 1918 he joined the Red Army and took part in the negotiations for the Treaty of Brest-Litovsk, but later that year he defected to the Whites and after the end of the Civil War he emigrated to Paris, France, where he remained until his death on 3 November 1937.
- Nikolai Fedorovich Drozdov - Major General in Tsarist army 1910–18. Red Army commander 1918–53, promoted to Colonel-General of artillery 1944.
- Konstantin Lukich Gilchevsky - General, veteran of the Russo-Turkish War (1877-78), the Russo-Japanese War, and commander of the 11th Army Corps in World War I. After the October Revolution he settled in Tbilisi, and after the Soviet invasion of Georgia he served in the Red Army in 1921–22.
- Aleksei Gutor - Lieutenant-general (1914) of noble origin, he was distinguished in the Brusilov offensive in 1916. Shortly before the Bolshevik Revolution he was commander of the Southwestern Front. He voluntarily placed himself at the disposal of the Red Army in 1918. A military specialist during the Civil War, he became a professor of Strategy and Tactics at the Military Academy of the Red Army afterwards.
- Yevgeni Iskritsky - Long-serving General of the Imperial Army, commanded many armies and fronts during World War I and decorated multiple times for bravery. After joining the Red Army, he took command of the 7th Army amongst other commands in the Civil War. He died in 1949, having earned 10 medals (Imperial and Soviet).
- Fyodor Kostyayev - Major-General, chief of staff of 1st Siberian Army Corps in 1917, after the revolution chief of staff of the Revolutionary Military Council of the Soviet Republic, teacher of tactics in the Frunze Military Academy until his death.
- Pyotr Kitkin - Admiral in Tsarist Navy 1916–18. Oversaw research on mine clearing for Soviet Navy during Great Patriotic War.
- Vladislav Klembovsky - The penultimate Commander-in-Chief of the Imperial Russian Army. Voluntarily joined the Red Army in 1918.
- Pavel Pavlovich Lebedev - Major General since 1915. Refused to join White Army, and was appointed chief of staff by Lenin.
- Alexander Litvinov - General of the cavalry, veteran of the Russo-Turkish War (1877-1878) and the Russo-Japanese War (1904–1905). Commander of the 1st Army in World War I, he was dismissed from the service with uniform and pension in 1917. From 1918 he served in the Red Army.
- Samad bey Mehmandarov - Azerbaijani General of the Artillery in the Russian Imperial Army, served in the Boxer Rebellion in China, the Russo-Japanese War, and World War I, commanding the elite 21st Infantry Division. He was decorated with the Order of Saint George of III degree for the battles of 27–29 September 1914, and Saint George Sword decorated with diamonds for the battle near Ivangorod on 14 February 1915. The latter was a very rare military award, only eight Russian commanders received it during the entire course of the World War I. From 1918 to 1920 he was the last Minister of Defense of independent Azerbaijan. After the Soviet invasion of Azerbaijan he taught in military schools and was an advisor to the Commissariat of Military and Naval Forces of the Azerbaijan SSR until his retirement in 1928.
- Dmitry Nikolayevich Nadyozhny - Russo-Japanese War veteran, promoted to major general in 1915. Served in the Red Army during Russian Civil War and as an instructor in the early years of the Great Patriotic War.
- Alexander Nemits - Promoted to rear admiral three months before the Revolution. Commander in chief of Red Fleet since 1921, and head of naval academy during World War II.
- Vasily Fedorovich Novitsky - A tsarist general noted for his liberal and progressive views already from the late 19th century. Commander of the Kiev gendarmes in the 1900s. During World War 1, Novitsky was part of the Northern Front, responsible for fighting the Central Powers from Riga in the north down to northern Belarus. When the Russian Revolution destroyed Imperial Russia, Novintsky came to accept the new social and political change. In Soviet history, he is credited by historians with having made "a notable contribution to the rise and evolution of Soviet military art." His brother Fedor Fedorovich (1870–1944) was also a Tsarist and Red Army general.
- Fyodor Ogorodnikov - Lieutenant-General in the Tsarist Army. He commanded successively the 26th Infantry Division, the 17th Army Corps and the Southwestern Front, where he succeeded Anton Denikin. After joining the Red Army, he was head of department at the Military Transport Academy and Professor at the Frunze Military Academy. Author of books on history and tactics. He died in Moscow in 1939. He was buried in the Novodevichy Cemetery.
- Dmitri Parsky - The first Tsarist general to join the Bolsheviks, commanded Northern Front during Russian Civil War.
- Alexei Polivanov - Infantry general (1915). He served as Russia's Minister of War from June 1915 until his Tsarina Alexandra forced his removal from office in March 1916. Following the Russian Revolution, Polivanov joined the Red Army in February 1920, participating in the Soviet-Polish peace talks in Riga later that year but died of typhus during the talks.
- Nikolay Potapov - Major General during World War I, one of the first generals to join the Bolsheviks, became the first Chief of Staff in the Red Army in 1918.
- Nikolay Rattel - Major General during World War I, veteran of the Russo-Japanese War, Chief of Staff of the Red Army 1919–1921. Executed on Stalin's orders in 1939.
- Aleksandr Vladimirovich Razvozov - Imperial rear admiral and commander of the Baltic Fleet in the summer of 1917. He was dismissed from service in late 1917 and then re-instated and finally dismissed and arrested in March 1918. Razvozov was soon released and worked in the naval archive during the remainder of 1918 and 1919. He was arrested by the Cheka in September 1919 on suspicion of conspiracy with the White Russian forces of General Nikolai Yudenich. He was imprisoned in the Kresty Prison and died of infection following an appendectomy. He is buried in the Smolensky Cemetery in Saint Petersburg.
- Alexander Samoylo - Major General of General Staff in Tsarist Army 1916–17. Lieutenant general of aviation in Red Army 1940–45.
- Vladimir Selivachyov - Lieutenant-general in the Imperial Army, commanded the 49th Army Corps and then the 7th Army in the Kerensky Offensive of 1917. He enlisted in the Red Army in 1918 and commanded the Selivachyov Group, composed of the 8th Army, 3rd and 42nd infantry Divisions of the 13th Army. His group spearheaded the Counteroffensive of Southern Front against the White Army. He died in 1919 of typhus or poisoning.
- Sergei Sheydeman - General in command of the Second Army after the suicide of Alexander Samsonov in September 1914. He organized the army's retreat from East Prussia and commanded the army for almost three years. Recipient of nine major Imperial medals, after the October Revolution, he went over to the Bolsheviks.
- Ali-Agha Shikhlinski - Lieutenant-General of Artillery from Azerbaijan, known as the God of Artillery. He served in the Boxer Rebellion in China, in the Russo-Japanese War, and in World War I. Inventor of the "Shiklinski triangle" target-finding device. He was the last commander of the 10th Russian Army in 1917. In 1918-20 he led the army of independent Azerbaijan against the Ottomans. After the Soviet invasion of Azerbaijan in 1921, he was seconded to Moscow, where he was an adviser to the artillery inspection department of Red Army and taught in Higher Artillery School. On 18 July 1921, Shikhlinski was transferred back to Baku, where he taught at a military school and became a deputy to the chairman of the military science society of Baku garrison. He retired in 1929 and died in 1943.
- Dmitry Shuvayev - Infantry General (1912) and Minister of War of the Russian Empire in 1916–17. After the October Revolution, Shuvayev served in the Red Army as a commander from 1918 to 1926 and taught at different military schools. He retired from military service in 1926.
- Movses Silikyan - Armenian general of the Imperial Army in World War I, participated in the Battle of Bitlis and the Battle of Erzurum (1916) and as the first Commander-in-Chief of the newly formed Armenian Army in 1918 he became a national hero of Armenia for his victory in the Battle of Sardarabad and the Battle of Abaran against the Ottomans. Marshal Ivan Bagramyan had said that Silikyan was "the most gifted military leader of all Armenian Generals of that time". When the Bolsheviks took over Armenia and established the Transcaucasian SFSR, Silikyan was appointed to a number of positions with the Soviets until 1937, when he was arrested and executed in Stalin's purges.
- Nikolai Skoblin - Tsarist general turned NKVD spy, responsible for the capture of Yevgeny Miller. Killed by a bombing raid on Barcelona during the Spanish Civil War.
- Yakov Slashchov - Major-General in the Tsarist Army and lieutenant-general in Wrangel's White Army, fled to Constantinople in 1920 but returned to Soviet Russia in 1921 to join the Red Army. Taught tactics in the Frunze Military Academy and was assassinated in 1929 by the brother of one of his Civil War victims.
- Andrei Snesarev - Lieutenant general in 1910, chief of staff of the 2nd Combined Cossack Division and then of the 12th Infantry Division of the Imperial Army. In World War I he took command of the 9th Army Corps. In the Civil War he commanded Red troops in the 1918 Battle of Tsaritsyn and in 1920 he delivered lectures on Afghanistan to the Oriental Section of the Military Academy of the Red Army.
- Mikhail Sokovin - Colonel in 1902, major-general in 1908, served in the Boxer Rebellion in China and in the Russo-Japanese War. In World War I he commanded the Eighth Army. In 1918 he voluntarily joined the Bolsheviks and held various posts in the Red Army during the Civil War. Taught tactics in military academies in the 1920s and 1930s. He died in Moscow in 1943 and was buried at the Novodevichy Cemetery.
- Nikolai Stogov - Lieutenant-General during World War I, replaced Potapov as Chief of Staff of the Red Army in 1918. The next year he deserted to Wrangel's White forces, in 1920 he fled to Yugoslavia and died in France.
- Alexander Andreyevich Svechin - Major-General in Tsarist army from 1916, Chief of Staff of the 5th Russian Army in World War I, veteran of the Russo-Japanese War. Joined the Red Army in March 1918, became leader of General Staff of the RSFSR, wrote important documents on Soviet military strategy. Executed on Stalin's orders in 1938.
- Pavel Sytin - Major general, commander of many imperial infantry divisions in World War I. After joining the Bolsheviks he was made commander-in-chief of the entire Southern Front in 1918, where Joseph Stalin was political commissar, and won the Battle of Tsaritsyn against Denikin and Krasnov.
- Alexander von Taube - A baron, he had served as major-general in the Russo-Japanese War and lieutenant-general in World War I, commanding the 5th Siberian infantry division. Conscripted in the Red Army in 1918 as a military specialist, his service was planning strategic operations in Siberia. Captured by the Volunteer Army of Alexander Kolchak, he died in 1919 of typhus in captivity.
- Pyotr Telezhnikov - Major general in 1909, commander of the 2nd Army in 1917. After the October Revolution, he offered his services to the Soviet Red Army, where he was stationed at Yaroslavsky District, Yaroslavl Oblast from January to December 1919. He retired on 7 August 1920.
- Aleksandr Verkhovsky - Major General in the old army, the last Minister of War before the October Revolution. Since June 1922, he was head of the Military Academy of the Red Army. Head of the Military Academic Courses of the Higher Command of the Red Army, Senior Lecturer of the Military Academy of the Red Army. Since 1927 Professor. Arrested in 1931 as part of the Vesna Case he was released by the mediation of Marshal Voroshilov. Arrested again during the Great Purge, he was executed in 1938.
- Vladimir Yegoryev - Chief of Staff of the 3rd Army Corps and then commander of the 39th Army Corps of the Tsarist Army. After the October Revolution, he was elected as commander of the Special Army of the South-Western Front in December 1917. From January 1918 he commanded the troops of the South-Western Front. From March to September 1918 he was the military leader of the Western Curtain. Regarded as a military expert, he continued teaching in Soviet military academies after his retirement from active service. He died in 1948.
- Andrei Zayonchkovsky - Oversaw defence of Dobruja in 1917. Joined Red Army in 1918 and later worked as a teacher at the military academy.
- Alexander Zelenoy - Imperial Rear Admiral, he was head of mine defence on the Baltic Sea and the head of the Staff of the Baltic Fleet in 1917. Famous for being one of the commanders of the Ice Cruise of the Baltic Fleet in 1918. He became commander of the Baltic Fleet in 1919 and took part in the defence of Petrograd against Yudenich during the Russian Civil War. Zelenoy died of natural causes in September 1922 and was buried in the Kazachye Cemetery of the Alexander Nevsky Lavra.

== Senior officers ==
- Semyon Aralov - Grenadier in the Russo-Japanese war, staff officer in the Third Army in World War I, and major in the Military Intelligence until 1917. After joining the revolution he became the first head of the Intelligence Directorate of the Red Army. He fought in the Great Patriotic War, was discharged in the age of 66 in 1946 and died in 1969.
- Christophor Araratov - Armenian Lieutenant-Colonel of artillery in the Russian Imperial Army in World War I, then major-general in the Armenian Army of the newly established First Republic of Armenia. He played a decisive role in winning the Battle of Sardarapat in 1918 against the Turks. After the Soviet invasion of Armenia in 1921, he joined the Red Army and took a position as head assistant of a rifle division. Later he was appointed as head of military chairs at Yerevan State University and then at National Economy Institute.
- Voldemar Aussem - A nobleman by birth, of German descent, he was a colonel in the Tsarist Army when he joined the revolution. He was chief of staff of the 2nd Ukrainian (Red) Army in 1919–20, a member of the Revolutionary Military Council, and an ambassador to Vienna in 1924. He died in 1936.
- Josef Bashko - Colonel in Tsarist Air Force and Sikorsky Ilya Muromets bomber pilot during World War I. Joined Red Army in 1918, dismissed in 1921, and later became a general in Latvian Air Force.
- Mikhail Batorsky - A member of the nobility and son of an officer, he served in Her Majesty's Lifeguard Cuirassier Regiment. In World War I he was a colonel and adjutant to the staffs of many armies. Joining the Red Army in 1918, he became chief-of-staff of the Western Front in 1921.
- Georgy Bazilevich - Lieutenant-Colonel of the 211th Nikolsky infantry regiment of the Tsarist Army, was wounded six times and received eight military awards. In 1917 he was deputy chairman of the executive committee of the (Imperial) Russian Special Army. Joining the Bolsheviks, he commanded several divisions in the Civil War and was then promoted to Komkor. in 1939 he was executed.
- Yevgeny Berens - Captain in Tsarist navy. Served on Soviet naval general staff 1917–28.
- Stepan Bogomyagkov - Lieutenant-Colonel (regimental commander) in the Imperial Army. He was promoted to Komkor on 11 November 1935. During the Great Purge, he was arrested in February 1938. Unlike many of his colleagues, he was not executed. In 1941, he was sentenced to 10 years in a Gulag labor camp. He was released in 1948 after seven years and lived in retirement in his home region of Perm Oblast. He was not reinstated in the army but did receive a pension.
- Georgy Bulatsel - Lieutenant-Colonel in the Imperial Army. Of noble origins, he fought in both the Russo-Japanese war and World War I. He joined the Finnish Red Guards in 1918 as a military specialist, fought in the Battle of Tampere and was arrested and executed by counter-revolutionary Finnish forces.
- Lev Galler - Executive officer on Russian battleship Slava 1916–17, later a Soviet admiral during Russian Civil War and Great Patriotic War. Died in prison in 1950.
- Abdulhamid bey Gaytabashi - Azerbaijani captain in the Tsarist Army in World War I, recipient of the Order of St. Vladimir and the last Chief of Staff of the Azerbaijani Armed Forces in 1920. After occupation of Azerbaijan by Bolsheviks, he was appointed Chief of General Staff of the Red Army Corps in Azerbaijan. However, in June 1920 he was executed by firing squad for his alleged role in Ganja revolt.
- Vladimir Gittis - Commander of the 148th infantry regiment in World War I, became a komkor after joining the Red Army and fought in the Russian Civil War and Polish-Soviet War.
- Vasily Glagolev (commander) - Tsarist colonel 1916–17, Red Army general during Russian Civil War. Executed during the purges of the Stalin era.
- Vladimir Grendal - Veteran of the 1905 Battle of Mukden and much-decorated Colonel (polkovnik) of the Imperial Army in World War I. He joined the Red Army as inspector of artillery in many fronts in the Civil War, an he directed the Soviet artillery's successful breach of the Mannerheim Line in the Winter War in 1940.
- Vladimir Kachalov - The last commander of the 58th "Prague" infantry regiment of the Russian Army in World War I. In the Red Army a lieutenant general. He was killed in 1941 fighting in the Battle of Smolensk against the Germans.
- Sergey Sergeyevich Kamenev - Regimental commander in the Tsarist army in World War I. Member of the Revolutionary Military Council Commander in Chief of the Red Army from July 1919 to 1924, head of the Red Army's Air Defence Department from 1934 to his death, Hero of the Soviet Union.
- Dmitry Karbyshev - Lieutenant-colonel in the Tsarist army, joined the Red Guards in 1917 and oversaw construction of fortifications in the USSR. A Red Army general in the Great Patriotic War, he fought in the Battle of Bialystok-Minsk and was captured by the Germans. He led many resistance movements inside Nazi concentration camps, and on the night of 17 February 1945, together with other 500 prisoners, he was doused with cold water and left to expire in the frost. Posthumously awarded the Hero of the Soviet Union.
- Nikolai Kashirin - Regimental commander in World War I, receiving the Order of Saint Vladimir and the Order of Saint Anna. In the Red Army he reached the rank of komandarm and headed the North Caucasus Military District from 1931 to 1937, when he was arrested and executed.
- Aleksey Krylov - Maritime engineer, professor and head of shipbuilding with Tsarist navy before 1917. Awarded a Stalin prize in 1941 for his research on hydrodynamics.
- August Kork - Lieutenant Colonel in Tsarist army, later commander of the 6th Army
- Nikolay Kuibyshev - Major (battalion commander) in the 10th Malorossiya Grenadier Regiment of the Tsarist Army, son of an army officer and brother of future Bolshevik politician Valerian Kuibyshev. Wounded three times in World War I, in 1918 he joined the Red Army and became commander of the 3rd and 9th Rifle Divisions on the Southern Front of the Russian Civil War. During the 1920s, Kuibyshev commanded a corps, courses for Red Army commanders, the group of Soviet advisors in China, and the Siberian Military District. He became secretary for Rabkrin, the Workers' and Peasants' Inspectorate, and a member of the Party Control Commission during the 1930s. Kuibyshev became commander of the Transcaucasian Military District in 1937. During the Great Purge, he was arrested in February 1938 and executed in August. Posthumously pardoned in 1956.
- Gavril Kutyrev - A yesaul of the Don Cossacks, Chief of Staff of the 84th Infantry Division in the Russian Imperial Army during World War I, then commander of the 8th Red Army in the Civil War and Chief of Staff of the 12th Army.
- Vladimir Lazarevich - A General Staff Academy graduate, he was lieutenant colonel in the Imperial Army in World War I and chief of staff of the 18th Army Corps in 1917. Voluntarily joining the Red Army in 1918, he commanded the 4th Army in 1919 against Kolchak and the 3rd Army in 1920 against the Poles. In 1921 as commander of the Turkestan Front he put down the Basmachi rebellion in Central Asia. After the war he was director of the Zhukovsky Air Force Engineering Academy from 1925 to 1927.
- Ivan Loiko - Flying ace and colonel in the Tsarist Air Force, fought for the White Army during Russian Civil War. Joined Red Army in 1924, later imprisoned during the Stalin era for espionage.
- Mikhail Matiyasevich - From the nobility of the Smolensk province, he fought in the Russo-Japanese War, as a lieutenant in the 220th Infantry Regiment. In the First World War, he fought on the Western and Northern fronts. He was wounded four times. Having become a colonel in July 1916, he commanded the 717th Infantry Regiment. In the days of the October Revolution he was unanimously elected by the soldiers as commander of the regiment. In February 1918 he was demobilized and apparently for ideological reasons, he voluntarily joined the Red Army in April 1918. He was given command of the 7th Army in the defense of Petrograd against Yudenich, the 3rd Army in the defeat of Kolchak, and the 5th Army in the operations against Baron Sternberg. He died in Kiev in August 1941, a month before its occupation by the Germans.
- Sergei Mezheninov - Much-decorated Captain of the Life Guards in World War I, commander of the 12th and 15th Red armies during the Civil War. At the time of the Great Purge, Mezheninov was arrested after a suicide attempt on 20 June 1937. He was accused of spying for Nazi Germany, convicted and later executed.
- Filipp Mironov - Don Cossack, veteran of the Russo-Japanese War, and a much-decorated Deputy Commander of the 32nd Don Regiment in 1916. In the Red Army, he commanded the 2nd Cavalry Army between 6 September and 6 December 1920, with which he participated in the Siege of Perekop (1920). Loyal to the Revolution, he was condemned to death at a show-trial organized by Trotsky. He was pardoned on the eve of this execution, but later re-arrested and shot in 1921.
- Syla Mishchenko - He was an officer of the Russian Imperial Army from Ukraine, and a kombrig in the Red Army after the revolution. He was shot in the Purge of the Red Army in 1941.
- Mikhail Artemyevich Muravyov - Lieutenant-Colonel during World War I, joined the Left SRs in 1917 and the Bolsheviks in 1918. He led the Red Army into Kiev, then joined the anti-Bolshevik Left SR Uprising and was shot by the Bolsheviks.
- Eduard Pantserzhanskiy - Naval officer in the Baltic Fleet in World War I, promoted to Vice admiral after joining the Revolution, Commander-in-Chief of the Soviet Navy 1921–24.
- Max Reyter - Latvian colonel in the Tsarist Army, lieutenant general in the Red Army. He commanded the Bryansk Front in 1942, becoming the first officer of non-Slavic origin to command a Front of the Red Army.
- Alexey Schastny - Captain 1st rank in the Tsarist Navy and commander of the Baltic Fleet after the October Revolution. He had disagreements with Trotsky and was arrested in 1918 and shot as a "counter-revolutionary".
- Alexander Sedyakin - Regimental commander in World War I who joined the Red Army in 1918. He crushed the East Karelian uprising in 1922 and rose to the rank of Komkor (corps commander). Killed in 1938 during Stalin's purges.
- Boris Shaposhnikov - Colonel of grenadier regiment during World War I. Chief of staff and later Marshal of the Soviet Union during the Great Patriotic War.
- Dmitry Shmidt - A Bolshevik since 1915. Drafted into the Imperial Army he fought in World War I. For his actions Shmidt was awarded the Cross of St. George in all four classes. In February 1916, he was made an officer. Shmidt was wounded three times and reached the rank of battalion commander (Major) in 1917. In the Civil War he commanded the 37th Rifle Division in Tsaritsyn and in Ukraine against Symon Petliura. During heavy fighting near Shepetivka with Petliura's army, Shmidt, according to the citation, had been seriously wounded but remained in the battle, personally operating guns against an armored train. In peacetime he commanded many Cossack cavalry divisions and the 8th Mechanized Brigade in the 1930s. He was executed in 1937.
- Vasily Shorin - Colonel of the 333rd Infantry Glazovsky Regiment in 1916, he joined the Revolution in 1917. He first commanded the 26th Rifle Division, then the Caucasian Front, the Southeastern Front and a special three-army group of the Southern Group. He fought against Kolchak and Denikin, and led the Perm and Ekaterinburg operations.
- Aleksandr Shuvayev - Tsarist Lieutenant-Colonel, son of imperial War Minister Dmitry Shuvayev. Both he and his father joined the Red Army. He served as Chief of Staff of the 4th Army in the Polish-Soviet War. He died in 1943.
- Pēteris Slavens - Latvian regimental commander in the Imperial Army in World War I. Retiring due to health issues in 1917, he came back to service in 1918 for the Red Army and was given command of the Southern Front. He died in 1919 of pneumonia.
- Nikolai Sollogub - Colonel and aide-de-camp to the Quartermaster-General of the 1st Army in the Russian Empire. He voluntarily joined the Red Army and became chief-of-staff of the Western Front. He was regarded as one of the most skilled officers of the Red side during the Civil War.
- Mikhail Svechnikov - Colonel in the Tsar's army, the highest-ranked Imperial officer to join the Finnish Red Guards in the Finnish Civil War in 1918. Commander of the Caspian-Caucasian Front in 1919, and teacher/lecturer in the Frunze Academy in the 1920s and 1930s. He was accused of fascist conspiracy during the Great Purge of 1937-38 and executed.
- Alexander Todorsky - He was the last commander of the 5th Siberian Corps of the Imperial Army in November 1917. In the Red Army he commanded the 13th Rifle Corps and reached the rank of lieutenant general. He was a recipient of the Order of the Red Banner and the Order of the Red Star. He was a graduate of the Frunze Military Academy. He retired from the military at the age of 61. He died in 1965 and is buried at Novodevichy Cemetery.
- Fedor Tokarev - Cossack officer and director of small arms factory at Izhevsk before the Revolution. Designed the SVT-38 and TT-33 during the Communist era.
  - Fedor's son Nikolai Tokarev also designed arms for the Red Army.
- Jukums Vācietis - Latvian colonel of the Tsarist army, commander of the Red Latvian Riflemen in 1917, first Commander in Chief of the Red Army (until July 1919). Executed in 1937 during Stalin's purges.
- Alexander Vekman - Captain in the Tsarist Navy and Vice Admiral in the Soviet Navy. He was awarded the Order of Lenin, two Orders of the Red Banner, Order of the Patriotic War (1st Class), and numerous medals. He died in 1955.
- Gaspar Voskanyan - Armenian lieutenant-Colonel in the Imperial Army, komkor in the Red Army, commander of the 25th Rifle Division until 1937, when he was executed in Stalin's purge.
- Vadim Yakovlev - Cossack yesaul, veteran of the Imperial cavalry, he first served in Denikin's White Army commanding a Cossack brigade, then joined the Reds and fought in the First Cavalry Army under Semyon Budyonny. In the Polish-Soviet War of 1920 he again switched sides, joining the Polish Army. The troops of Yakovlev were particularly notorious for their cruel and bloody marauding of villages and towns in Ukraine and Belarus and anti-Jewish pogroms in the early 1920s.
- Alexander Yegorov - Lieutenant colonel during World War I before joining Bolsheviks in 1917. Executed on Stalin's orders in 1939.

== Junior officers ==
- Maksim Antoniuk - Lieutenant in the Tsarist army during World War I, Komkor during Russian Civil War, and Red Army general during World War II.
- Alexei Ivanovich Avtonomov - He was a Kuban Cossack. He fought in World War I with the rank of cornet (sub-lieutenant) but rose quickly during the civil war. In 1918 he led the famous Ice March to defend Ekaterinodar from General Kornilov. He distinguished himself in many fronts, but he died of typhus in 1919.
- Feliksas Baltušis-Žemaitis - Lithuanian podporuchik of the Imperial Army in World War I, major general of the Red Army in World War II. He was a lecturer/docent at the Frunze Military Academy in 1935–1940. Baltušis-Žemaitis briefly commanded the Lithuanian People's Army in 1940 during the Soviet occupation of Lithuania. He earned his Candidate of Military Sciences academic degree in 1940. In the war against Germany he led the 16th Lithuanian Rifle Division. He was also a senior lecturer at the USSR General Staff Academy during 1940–1941 and 1943–1945, and served as the chief of USSR Supreme Command Courses 1945–1947.
- Ivan Bagramyan - Promoted to Praporschik before October Revolution. Red Army general during the Battle of Kursk, and military expert for the North Vietnamese Army during the Vietnam War.
- Aksel Berg - Junior navigating officer on Russian battleship Tsarevich and later submarine commander during Russian Civil War. Introduced radar and cybernetics to the USSR.
- Reingold Berzin - Latvian poruchik in World War I, joined the Bolsheviks and fought against the revolt of the Czechoslovak Legion. In 1924 he retired from the Red Army and worked in the military industry. He was executed in 1938 during Stalin's purges.
- Hayk Bzhishkyan - Also known as General Gai. Promoted from company commander to senior lieutenant by Nikolai Yudenich in World War I. Joined the Red Army in 1918 and commanded the 24th Rifle Division in the Battle of Warsaw.
- Kasyan Chaykovsky - Company commander in World War I, joined the Red Army and commanded many rifle divisions and later mechanized corps. He was tortured to death by the NKVD in 1938.
- Aleksandr Cherepanov (general) - Platoon commander 1915–17. Later participated in Russian Civil War, Polish-Soviet War, Sino-Japanese War, and Great Patriotic War.
- Ivan Naumovich Dubovoy - Ukrainian praporshchik in the Imperial Army, then commander of the 1st Ukrainian Soviet Army and general in the Red Army. He was killed in Stalin's purges.
- Robert Eideman - Latvian praporshchik (1915–17), Soviet komkor from 1935, writer and poet. He was executed during Stalin's purges.
- Ilya Garkavyi - Company commander in the 260th infantry regiment of the Imperial Army, then Corps commander in the Red Army.
- Leonid Govorov - Artillery podporuchik since 1917. Conscripted into White Army in 1918 and deserted to the Reds the following year. Awarded the Order of the Red Star for breaching the Mannerheim Line during the Winter War of 1940, and promoted to Marshal of the Soviet Union in 1944.
- Oka Gorodovikov - A Don Cossack, Senior sergeant in the 9th Don Cossack Cavalry regiment of the Imperial Army in World War I, commander of the 2nd Cavalry Army of the Red Army in the Civil War. He also participated in World War II as inspector-general and then deputy commander of the cavalry.
- Mikhail Gromov (military) - Farman bomber pilot in Tsarist Air Force during World War I, and colonel general in Red Air Force during Great Patriotic War.
- Ivan Isakov - Midshipman in Tsarist Navy during World War I. Admiral in Soviet Navy during Great Patriotic War.
- Yakov Korotayev - He was a Baikal Cossack and participant of World War I in the Persian Campaign. Joining the Bolsheviks in 1918, he organized volunteer partisan detachments in Transbaikal to fight against ataman Grigory Semyonov. After Pavel Zhuravlev's death he was appointed the commander-in-chief of the Eastern Transbaikalian Front.
- Grigory Kotovsky - He was a young gangster in Bessarabia in the 1900s, fought in the Russo-Japanese War and World War I, where he was promoted to Praporshchik in 1917 and awarded the St. George Cross for bravery. He joined the revolution and commanded many armies in the Civil War, defeating White general Nikolai Yudenich. He was assassinated in 1925 by a Jewish gangster and former associate of Mishka Yaponchik.
- Yuriy Kotsiubynsky - Ukrainian praporshchik in 1916–17, he took part in the Bolshevik storming of the Winter Palace in October 1917. In January 1918 he was made Chief of Staff of the Soviet Ukrainian People's Republic. In this capacity he fought against Kerensky and Krasnov. He was executed in Stalin's purges.
- Yepifan Kovtyukh - Staff-captain under the Tsar, then leader of the Taman Army in the Civil War and komkor in the Red Army.
- Nikolai Krylenko - Sub-lieutenant (praporshchik) in the Tsarist Army. After the October Revolution, he was made the last Commander-in-Chief of that army, responsible for its disarmament and armistice negotiations with the Germans. He later became Minister of Justice in the USSR.
- Vasily Kuznetsov - Commissioned as a lieutenant in 1916, and commanded Red Army troops during Russian Civil War. Lieutenant general during Great Patriotic War.
- Boris Legran - Staff captain in 1915–17, joined the Bolsheviks and became Deputy Commissar of Naval Affairs in 1918 and then Chief of Staff of the 10th Army in 1919. From 1931 to 1934 he was director of the State Hermitage Museum in Leningrad.
- Vasily Malyshkin - Praporschik during World War I, later became a Red Army general. Executed for treason after the war for collaborating with the Nazis.
- Mikhail Meandrov - Tsarist captain during World War I, commanded the Sixth Army during the Great Patriotic War until captured in 1941. Hanged in 1946 for joining Andrey Vlasov's Russian Liberation Army.
- Alexander Miasnikian - Armenian praporshchik in World War I and the last commander of the Western Front. A Bolshevik, he became a member of the Revolutionary Military Council and after 1921 head of state of the Armenian SSR. He was instrumental in the formation of state institutions and economy of the republic and in eradicating the illiteracy and developing local manufacturing in Armenia. He died in 1925 in a mysterious plane crash. He is still celebrated as a national hero in Armenia.
- Alexander Nikonov - Lieutenant in the 55th Infantry division in World War I, joined the Red Army and became division commander and head of the Intelligence Directorate of the General Staff.
- Vladimir Mitrofanovich Orlov - Navigating officer in the battleship Bogatyr in World War I, joined the revolution and reached the rank of admiral and Commander-In-Chief of the Soviet Navy from 1931 to 1937, when he was killed in Stalin's purges.
- Vladimir Antonov-Ovseyenko - Podporushchik (second lieutenant) during the Russo-Japanese War and a Bolshevik even before the Revolution. Took part in the October 1917 seizure-of-power in Petrograd, commanded many armies in the Civil War, crushed the Tambov Rebellion in 1921 and ended his career as a Soviet diplomat.
- Semyon Pugachov - Captain in the Tsarist Army, chief of staff of the Caucasian Front in the Red Army. Suppressed the August Uprising in Georgia. He died in prison in 1943.
- Maksim Purkayev - Praporschik in Tsarist Army 1915–18. Chief of Staff on southwestern front 1941–43.
- Fyodor Raskolnikov - Midshipman in Tsarist Navy 1914–17, participated in Kronstadt Mutiny and the battle of Enzeli as commander of the Caspian Flotilla. Escaped to France during the purges, and was murdered by NKVD agents in 1939.
- Prokofy Romanenko - Sergeant in Tsarist Army, promoted to Praporschik in 1917. Red Army general during Russian Civil War, Spanish Civil War and Great Patriotic War.
- Yuriy Sablin - Praporshchik in World War I, suffered from gas poisoning in 1916. He joined the Left SRs in 1917 and the Bolsheviks in 1918. He fought in Ukraine against Denikin and Wrangel commanding the 16th Cavalry Division and the 41st Rifle Division. In 1921 he participated in extinguishing the Kronstadt rebellion. By the end of the Russian Civil War, Sablin finished the Military Academy and Higher academic courses in 1923 and pilot school in 1925. Since 1931 he headed administration of military engineering works and commandant of a fortified district in Ukraine. In 1936 Sablin was commander of the 97th Rifle Division, but on 25 September 1936 he was arrested and killed by a firing squad in 1937.
- Andrei Sazontov - Poruchik (lieutenant) in Tsarist Army, corps commander in the Red Army, executed in Stalin's Great Purge of 1938.
- Alexander Sedyakin - Commissioned officer 1915, joined soldiers' committee after the Revolution. Fought against the forces of Kolchak and Wrangel during the Russian Civil War. Executed during Stalin's Great Purge of 1938.
- Petr Efimovich Shchetinkin - Much-decorated staff captain in the 59th Siberian Regiment in World War I, famous Red partisan leader in Siberia, commanded the 35th Rifle Division and defeated the forces of Baron Roman von Ungern-Sternberg in Mongolia in 1921.
- Nikolay Shchors - Junior lieutenant (podporuchik) in the 84th Division (South-Western Front) in World War I, joined the Red Army in 1918 and had become a general in the age of 24, when he was killed near Zhytomyr in 1919.
- Alexander Sirotkin - Poruchik in the Imperial Army in World War I. He received the Cross of St. George, the Order of St. Vladimir, the Order of St. Anna and the Order of Saint Stanislaus (Russian). After the October Revolution in November 1917, he went over to the Bolsheviks and fought for them in the subsequent civil war, commanding the 15th Rifle Division. He was awarded the Order of Lenin, the Order of the Red Banner, the Order of the Red Star and for his participation in the Great Patriotic War, the Order of Suvorov. He died in 1965.
- Ivan Sorokin - Staff captain of Cossack origin, created the first detachments of Red Cossacks and led the 11th Red Army in the early stages of the Civil War. He was assassinated in November 1918.
- Vladimir Strzhizhevsky - Tsarist lieutenant and fighter pilot, forced to join Soviet Air Force in 1917. Deserted to the Whites in 1918, and in 1920 joined Yugoslav Air Force.
- Pyotr Sobennikov - Cornet in Tsarist cavalry since 1916. Red Army general during Great Patriotic War.
- Viktor Spiridonov - Lieutenant during Russo-Japanese War and World War I. Served as a martial arts coach in the Red Army during the Great Patriotic War.
- Mavriky Slepnyov - Staff captain 1915–17. Colonel in Soviet Air Force, awarded Hero of the Soviet Union for rescuing crew of SS Chelyuskin in 1934.
- Vladimir Triandafillov - Captain in Tsarist Army from 1915 to 1917. Joined Red Army during Russian Civil War, killed in a plane crash in 1931.
- Fyodor Truhin - Praporschik during World War I, and Red Army commander 1918–41. Executed for treason in 1946 for defecting to the Nazis.
- Fyodor Tolbukhin Tsarist army captain during WWI. Red Army general during WWII.
- Mikhail Tukhachevsky - Second lieutenant 1914–17. Commanded Fifth Army during Russian Civil War, executed during Stalin's purge of 1937.
- Semyon Uritsky - Praporshchik in the Tsarist Army, headed the Odessa Red Guards in 1918, fought in the Civil War and took part in suppressing the Kronstadt rebellion in 1921. From 1935 to 1937 he was head of the Main Intelligence Directorate of the Red Army. He was killed in Stalin's purges.
- Matvei Vasilenko - Ukrainian company-commander in the Tsarist Army, joined the Red Army and commanded the 9th, 11th and 14th armies in the Civil War.
- Aleksandr Vasilevsky - Tsarist army captain during World War I. Joined Red Army in 1917 and became a Marshal of the Soviet Union during the Great Patriotic War.
- Mikhail Viktorov - Navigating officer of the battleship Tsesarevich in World War I. In the Civil War he joined the Bolsheviks and commanded the cruiser Oleg and subsequently the battleships Andrei Pervozvanny and Gangut. Promoted to admiral in 1925, he commanded the Baltic Fleet and in 1932 was the founding commander of the Soviet Pacific Fleet. Became Commander-In-Chief of the Soviet Navy in 1937, but was executed the same year in Stalin's purges.
- Vincas Vitkauskas - Lithuanian podporuchik in the Tsarist Army during World War I, he joined the newly formed Lithuanian Army and was a hero of the Lithuanian Wars of Independence. He led the Lithuanian Army into Vilnius in 1939 and was the Chief of Staff of the Lithuanian Army in 1940. After the Soviet occupation, he commanded the Red Army's 29th Rifle Corps, consisting mostly of Lithuanian soldiers. In June 1941, just before the German invasion of Russia, Vitkauskas was sent to the Military Academy of the General Staff in Moscow where he studied and later taught until early 1946. He returned to Lithuania and taught at the University of Kaunas and Kaunas Polytechnic Institute until retirement in 1954.
- Pavel Yegorov - Tsarist army captain in 1915–17, joined the Bolsheviks and led the Yekaterinoslav Bolshevik Uprising in 1918. He also fought in World War II and died in 1965.
- Pavel Zhuravlev (partisan) - A poor Cossack, he served in the Imperial Army from 1913 and fought in the Romanian Front in World War I, reaching a lower rank and being wounded twice. In the Civil War he organized partisan detachments in Transbaikal and took part in the Bogdat battle. He reached the rank of Commander-in-chief of the Eastern Transbaikalian Front, but was deadly wounded in 1920.
- Stepan Zotov - A Don Cossack khorunzhyi and recipient of the Cross of St. George in World War I, he joined the Red Army in the Civil War and was made a komkor on 23 November 1935. He died in a Moscow military hospital during a surgical operation in 1938.
