= 6th Cavalry Corps (Soviet Union) =

- Allegiance: Soviet Union
- Branch: Soviet Red Army
- Engagements: Soviet invasion of Poland

The 6th Cavalry Corps was a corps of the Soviet Red Army. It was part of the 11th Army. It took part in the Soviet invasion of Poland in 1939.

On 23 June 1941, Wolfram Freiherr von Richthofen's 8th Air Corps decimated the corps, operating as part of Western Front, when the 6th Cavalry Corps attempted a counterattack near Grodno. Richthofen threw all available aircraft at the thrust and played a vital role in its defeat. The Soviet corps suffered 50 per cent casualties, mostly from air attack. In 500 sorties, Richthofen's 8th Air Corps claimed 30 tanks and 50 motor vehicles.

== Organization ==
- 4th Cavalry Division
- 6th Cavalry Division
- 11th Cavalry Division

== Commanders ==
Corps commanders:

- Komdiv Yelisey Goryachev (17.07.1935 - 25.01.1938),
- Komdiv Georgy Zhukov (25.02.1938 - 10.06.1938),
- Komkor Andrey Yeryomenko (10.06.1938 - 04.06.1940),
- Major general Ivan Semenovich Nikitin (04.06.1940 - 06.07.1941) (POW, executed in captivity in 1942);
