= Case of the Trotskyist Anti-Soviet Military Organization =

1937 secret trial of the Red Army high command during the Great Purge

The Case of the Trotskyist Anti-Soviet Military Organization, also known as the Military Case or the Tukhachevsky Case, was a 1937 secret trial of the high command of the Red Army, a part of the Great Purge.

== Defendants ==
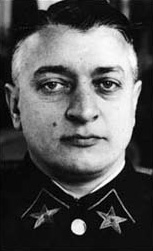
Marshal Mikhail Tukhachevsky

The Case was a secret trial, unlike the Moscow Show Trials. It is traditionally considered one of the key trials of the Great Purge. Marshal Mikhail Tukhachevsky and the senior military officers Iona Yakir, Ieronim Uborevich, Robert Eideman, August Kork, Vitovt Putna, Boris Feldman, and Vitaly Primakov (as well as Yakov Gamarnik, who committed suicide before the investigations began) were accused of anti-Soviet conspiracy and sentenced to death; they were executed on the night of June 11 to 12, 1937, immediately after the verdict delivered by a Special Session (специальное судебное присутствие) of the Supreme Court of the Soviet Union.

The Tribunal was presided over by Vasili Ulrikh and included marshals Vasily Blyukher, Semyon Budyonny, Alexander Yegorov; Army Commanders Yakov Alksnis, Boris Shaposhnikov, Ivan Belov, Pavel Dybenko, and Nikolai Kashirin; and Corps Commander Yelisey Goryachev. Only Ulrikh, Budyonny and Shaposhnikov would survive the purges that followed.

The trial triggered a massive subsequent purge of the Red Army. In September 1938, the People's Commissar for Defense, Kliment Voroshilov, reported that a total of 37,761 officers and commissars were dismissed from the army, 10,868 were arrested and 7,211 were condemned for anti-Soviet crimes.

== Background ==
The trial was preceded by several purges of the Red Army. In the mid-1920s, Leon Trotsky was removed as Commissar of War, and his known supporters were expunged from the military. Former tsarist officers had been purged in the late 1920s and early 1930s. The latter purge was accompanied by the "exposure" of the "Former Officers Plot" codenamed Operation Vesna. The next wave of arrests of military commanders started in the second half of 1936 and increased in scope after the February–March 1937 Plenary Meeting of the Central Committee of the Communist Party of the Soviet Union (CPSU), where Vyacheslav Molotov called for more thorough exposure of "wreckers" within the Red Army since they "had already been found in all segments of the Soviet economy".

== Evidence, arrest and secret trial ==
General Mikhail Tukhachevsky was arrested on May 22, 1937, and charged, along with seven other Red Army commanders, with the creation of a "right-wing-Trotskyist" military conspiracy and espionage for Nazi Germany, based on confessions obtained from other arrested officers.

Before 1990, it was frequently argued that the case against the eight generals was based on forged documents created by the Abwehr, documents that deluded Stalin into believing that a plot was being fomented by Tukhachevsky and other Red Army commanders to depose him. However, once Soviet archives were opened to researchers after the fall of the Soviet Union, it became clear that Stalin actually concocted the fictitious plot by the most famous and important of his Soviet generals in order to get rid of them in a believable manner.

At Stalin's order, the NKVD instructed one of its agents, Nikolai Skoblin, to concoct information suggesting a plot by Tukhachevsky and the other Soviet generals against Stalin and pass it to Reinhard Heydrich, chief of the German Sicherheitsdienst intelligence arm. Seeing an opportunity to strike a blow at both the Soviet Union and his archenemy Wilhelm Canaris of the German Abwehr, Heydrich immediately acted on the information and undertook to improve on it, forging a series of documents implicating Tukhachevsky and other Red Army commanders; these were later passed to the Soviets via Edvard Beneš and other neutral parties. Nevertheless, Soviet military prosecutors relied mostly on false confessions extorted or beaten out of the defendants rather than the forged documents during the case.

Afraid of the consequences of trying popular generals and war heroes in a public forum, Stalin ordered the trial also be kept secret and for the defendants to be executed immediately following their court-martial. Tukhachevsky and his fellow defendants were probably tortured into confessions.

All convicts were rehabilitated on January 31, 1957, for the "absence of essence of an offence". It was concluded that arrests, investigations and trials were performed in violation of procedural norms and based on forced confessions, in many cases obtained with the aid of physical violence.

== Consequences of the Trial ==
The execution of General Tukhachevsky and the other seven generals severely weakened the Soviet military. This was first seen in the Red Army's disastrous performance in the Soviet-Finnish war of 1939–1940, in which the Soviet military suffered more than 100,000 dead or missing against a smaller and poorly-armed Finnish military. The loss of the eight generals, combined with the 1941 Red Army Purge, enabled the early rapid successes of the German Wehrmacht in the 1941 Invasion of Russia, leading to severe loss of life and the devastation of most of the European section of the USSR.

== Unresolved issues ==
=== Reasons and motives ===
There are no conclusive facts about the real rationale behind the forged trial. Over the years, researchers and historians put forth the following hypotheses:

The central hypothesis and the one with the widest support is that Stalin had simply decided to consolidate his power by eliminating any and all potential political or military rivals. Viewed from the broader context of the Great Terror which followed, the execution of the most popular and well-regarded generals in the Red Army command can be seen as a preemptive move by Stalin and Nikolai Yezhov, People's Commissar of State Security, to eliminate a potential rival and source of opposition to their planned purge of the nomenklatura. The fall of the first eight generals was swiftly followed by the arrest of most of the People's Commissars, nearly all regional party secretaries, hundreds of Central Committee members and candidates and thousands of lesser CPSU officials. At the end, three of five Soviet Marshals, 90% of all Red Army generals, 80% of Red Army colonels and 30,000 officers of lesser rank had been purged, although some were allowed to return to service during World War II.

At first, it was thought 25-50% of Red Army officers were purged, but it is now known to be 3.7-7.7%. Previously, the size of the Red Army officer corps was underestimated, and it was overlooked that most of those purged were merely expelled from the Party. Thirty percent of officers purged during 1937 to 1939 were allowed back.

Another suggestion is that Tukhachevsky and others indeed tried to conspire against Stalin. Leon Trotsky, in his later works, argued that while it was impossible to speak conclusively about the plot, he saw indications in Stalin's mania for involvement in every detail of Red Army organization and logistics that the military had real reasons for dissent, which may have eventually led to a plot. However, the revelations of Stalin's actions following the release of Soviet archival information have now largely discredited this theory. While the military may well have had many secret reasons for their dislike of Stalin, there is now no credible evidence that any of them ever conspired to eliminate him.

Victor Suvorov has claimed that the purge was intended to replace Red Army officers with more competent generals for his future conquests. For example, he claims that the ultimate reason why Tukhachevsky was killed is because he failed to conquer Poland during the Polish-Soviet War; despite this failure, Tukhachevsky had made a career in the party when he suppressed the Tambov rebellion. Suvorov compared the change of leadership in the Army to the teeth of a shark: each new row is sharper than the previous one.

=== Speedy inquest ===
Vadim Rogovin's book 1937: Stalin's Year of Terror contains a lengthy discussion of another unexplained mystery: that it took only about two weeks to force admissions of guilt from the accused despite the fact that all of them were relatively young, able-bodied military trained people. Rogovin contrasts it with the Jewish Anti-Fascist Committee, where the inquest lasted about four years, despite brutal tortures.

== See also ==
- 1941 Red Army Purge

== Sources ==
- "Известия ЦК КПСС" ("Izvestiya TseKa KPSS" - Reports of the Central Committee of the CPSU), #4, April 1989).
- Barmine, Alexander, One Who Survived, New York: G. P. Putnam (1945)
- "Report of the Party Commission headed by N. Shernik, June 1964." Voennye Arkhivy Rossii, No. 1. Moscow 1993.
- Lukes, Igor, Czechoslovakia Between Stalin and Hitler: The Diplomacy of Edvard Beneš in the 1930s, Oxford University Press (1996), ISBN 0-19-510267-3, ISBN 978-0-19-510267-3,
- "M. N. Tukhachevskii i 'voenno-fashistskii zagovor,'" Voenno-istoricheskii Arkhiv, No. 1. Moscow, 1997.
- "The Case of the So-Called 'Anti-Soviet Trotskyite Military Organization' in the Red Army," Political Archives of the Soviet Union, vol. 1, No. 3., 1990.
- Suvorov, Viktor, The Cleansing (Очищение) by Suvorov, free Russian full text
- List of accused
