= Pyotr Bryanskikh =

Soviet komkor (corps commander)

- Born: 1896; Tambov Governorate, Russian Empire
- Died: 29 August 1938 (aged 41–42) Moscow Oblast, Soviet Union
- Allegiance: Russian Empire; Soviet Union
- Branch: Imperial Russian Army; Soviet Red Army
- Service years: 1915–1917 (Russian Empire); 1918–1937 (Soviet Union)
- Rank: Komkor
- Commands: Volga Military District
- Conflicts: World War I Russian Civil War

Pyotr Alexeyevich Bryanskikh (Russian: Пётр Алексеевич Брянских; 1896 – 29 August 1938) was a Soviet komkor (corps commander). He fought in the Imperial Russian Army during World War I before going over to the Bolsheviks during the subsequent civil war. He was a recipient of the Order of the Red Banner. On 20 November 1935, he was made a Komdiv (division commander) before being promoted to Komkor in 1937. He served as deputy commander of the Belorussian Military District before being transferred to command the Volga Military District. During the Great Purge, he was arrested on 18 July 1938 and later executed. After the death of Joseph Stalin, he was rehabilitated on 9 April 1955.

Military offices
| Preceded by Mikhail Grigoryevich Yefremov | Commander of the Volga Military District; November 1937 – 1938 | Succeeded by Kirill Meretskov |
