= Mikhail Alafuso =

Soviet general

Mikhail Ivanovich Alafuso
- Native name: Михаил Иванович Алафузо
- Born: 1891; Nikolaev, Russian Empire
- Died: July 13, 1937 (aged 45–46) Moscow, Soviet Union
- Allegiance: Russian Empire; Soviet Union
- Branch: Imperial Russian Army; Soviet Red Army
- Service years: 1918–1937 (Soviet Union)
- Rank: Komkor
- Conflicts: World War I Russian Civil War

Mikhail Ivanovich Alafuso (Russian: Михаил Иванович Алафузо; Ukrainian: Михайло Іванович Алафузо; 1891 – 13 July 1937) was a Soviet general who received the title of Komkor on November 11, 1935. He was born in Nikolaev (now Mykolaiv, Ukraine). He was a recipient of the Order of St. Anna and the Order of Saint Stanislaus (Russian) from the Russian Empire and the Order of the Red Banner from the Soviet Union. He fought in World War I in the Imperial Russian Army and in the Russian Civil War in the Soviet Red Army. During the Great Purge, he was arrested on April 15, 1937, and later executed in Moscow. He was on the death list of July 10, 1937, which was signed by Joseph Stalin and Vyacheslav Molotov.

== Biography ==
His father was a naval officer. In the First World War, he served in the 50th Białystok Infantry Regiment, and at the beginning of 1916 he had the rank of Podporuchik. By 1917, he served as a commander. In early 1918, he was mobilized into the Red Army, a member of the Civil War. To the question of how he could work honestly with the Red Army, he answered:

I don't hide it, I sympathize with the Whites, but I'll never be demeaning. I don't want to meddle in politics. We had a little work at the HQ, and I already feel like I'm becoming a patriot of the army. I am an honest officer of the Russian army and faithful to my word, even less an oath ... That doesn't not change. The task of the officer, as stated in our charters, is to protect the motherland from the enemies of the outside and the internal. And that debt, if I came to your service, I would be honest.

He was head of operational control of the North Ural-Siberian front (28.07-30.08.1918), Chief of Staff of the 3 Army (30.08.1918-26.08.1919 and 07.10-09.11.1919) and commander of that Army in August–October 1919.

He was a member of the Commission for the Accounting and organization of the armed Forces of the Republic (01.1919-04.1920), Assistant Chief of staff of the South-West front (06-28.12.1920), Chief of staff of the Kiev Military District.

- 1921-1924 Chief of Staff of the Moscow Military District.
- 1924-1927 Chief of Staff of the North Caucasus Military District.
- 1927-1935 Chief of Staff of the Red Caucasian Army.
- In 1935, he was promoted to the rank of Komkor.
- 1935-1937 head of the Department of the Organization and mobilization of the Military Academy of the General Staff.

Education is a higher level, graduating from the General Staff Academy.

Alafusov was arrested on April 15, 1937, on charges of espionage, sabotage and participation in a counter-revolutionary terrorist organization. In his testimony of May 22, Marshal Tukhachevsky, on June 1, was accused of transmitting information to German intelligence. In the so-called Stalin's lists, the NKVD lists prepared by the organs to be tried by the military Collegium of the Supreme Court of the USSR. The list was categorized as Category 1, which authorized the use of the death penalty as an attack. The list of July 10, 1937, containing the name of M. E. Alafuzo, was endorsed in person and Molotov. On July 13, 1937, the military Collegium of the Supreme Court of the USSR was sentenced to death by a high degree of punishment. The sentence was enforced on the same day. The ashes are buried in Don Cemetery. Rehabilitated November 22, 1960 decision of the ECCU USSR.

== Awards ==
- Order of the Red Banner (February 20, 1928)
- Order of the Red Banner of Labour (Transcaucasian Socialist Federative Soviet Republic, 1932)

== Bibliography ==
- Сувениров О. Ф. Трагедия РККА 1937–1938. — Москва: ТЕРРА, 1998. — 528 с. — ISBN 5-300-02220-9.
- Cherushev, Nikolai Semyonovich; Cherushev, Yury Nikolaevich (2012). Расстрелянная элита РККА (командармы 1-го и 2-го рангов, комкоры, комдивы и им равные): 1937—1941. Биографический словарь [Executed Elite of the Red Army (Komandarms of the 1st and 2nd ranks, Komkors, Komdivs, and equivalents) 1937–1941 Biographical Dictionary] (in Russian). Moscow: Kuchkovo Pole. ISBN 9785995002178.
