= Plastun =

Cossack foot scouting and sentry military unit

A plastun or plastoon (Ukrainian, Russian: пластун) was a Cossack foot scouting and sentry military unit. Originally, they were part of the Black Sea Cossack Host and then later in the 19th and 20th centuries Kuban Cossack Host.

== Early history ==
The tradition of foot scouts, vanguard troops, and ambushes, together with the term plastuny, belong to the early Cossack history of the Zaporizhian Sich and mentioned, e.g., by Vladimir Dahl in his Explanatory Dictionary of the Live Great Russian language. Plastun foot units were introduced during the Russian-Circassian War to guard and scout beyond the "Kuban Line", a frontier in the Kuban plains, against sudden Circassian raids.

Later, the name "plastoon regiments" was applied to all Cossack infantry. In the Russian Imperial Army, whole plastun regiments were formed. Normally, Cossacks had to buy their horses and horse tack with their own money, and plastuns did not have these expenses. Despite this, regular plastun units were not popular, since they did not fit the traditional notion of Cossack pride. Therefore, plastun units tended to consist of poorer people.

== Soviet period ==
The term was revived in the Soviet Army during the Great Patriotic War and used in the names of several Cossack battalions and regiments. The only plastun Cossack division of that time was the 9th Krasnodar Plastun Division, which fought in Northern Caucasus, Poland, and Czechoslovakia, and was one of the elite Soviet military units. Germans called them "Stalin's cutthroats". At the same time, "plastun" (i.e., infantry) regiments existed in the Cossack military that fought on the German side, in the XV SS Cossack Cavalry Corps and the Kazachi Stan militia.

== Name ==
The name derives from the word plast, "sheet" via an expression "to lay like a sheet", i.e., flat and low. The word "plastoon" also can refer to a member of a Ukrainian scouting organization Plast, named after the original plastoons.
