= Georgy Bondar =

Soviet corps commander (1893–1939)

Georgy Iosifovich Bondar
- Born: 1893; Russian Empire
- Died: March 10, 1939 (aged 45–46); Soviet Union
- Military career
- Allegiance: Russian Empire; Soviet Union
- Branch: Imperial Russian Army; Soviet Red Army
- Rank: Komkor
- Conflicts: World War I Russian Civil War

Georgy Iosifovich Bondar (Russian: Гео́ргий Ио́сифович Бо́ндарь; 1893 – March 10, 1939) was a Soviet komkor (corps commander). He fought for the Imperial Russian Army before going over to the Bolsheviks during the subsequent civil war. During the Great Purge, he was arrested on August 25, 1938, and executed the following year.

== Military career ==
In 1918-1919 he was commander of the light fleet of the 2nd artillery brigade, in 1919-1920 he was commander of an artillery battery, commander of a light artillery battalion. In 1921 he graduated from the Higher Artillery School. From 1921 to 1925 he was commander of the artillery battalion of the 15th rifle division, chief of artillery of the 23rd rifle division, from 1925 to 1928 he was inspector of artillery and armored forces of the Red Army, chief of artillery of the Volga Military District. In 1929 he was commander of the 48th Rifle Division, chairman of the Artillery Committee of the Artillery Directorate of the Red Army, head of the scientific and technical directorate of the Artillery Directorate of the Red Army, in 1929-1930 he was head of the Artillery Directorate of the Red Army. In 1930-1932 he was a student of the Special Group of the Frunze Military Academy. In 1932-1937 he was commander of the 17th Rifle Division, from May to November 1937 he was Deputy Head of the Artillery Directorate of the Red Army, from November 1937 to August 1938 he was Deputy People's Commissar of the Defense Industry of the USSR.

== Repression and rehabilitation ==
He was arrested on August 25, 1938, sentenced by the All-Union Military Commission of the USSR on March 10, 1939, to death on charges of participating in a counter-revolutionary terrorist organization and shot on the same day. He was rehabilitated posthumously on June 25, 1956.
