= Nikolai Fedorovich Drozdov =

Russian and Soviet military scientist (1962–1953)

- Born: 1862; Klintsy, Chernigov Governorate, Russian Empire
- Died: 1953 (aged 91); Moscow, Soviet Union
- Burial place: Moscow
- Relatives: Fedor Drozdov (father)
- Military career
- Allegiance: Russian Empire (1886–1917); USSR (1918–1953)
- Branch: Imperial Russian Army, Red Army
- Service years: 1886–1953
- Rank: Colonel General
- Conflicts: World War I; Russian Civil War; World War II
- Awards: Order of St Anne; Order of St. Stanislav; Order of St. Vladimir; Order of the Red Banner; Order of Lenin; Order of the Patriotic War; Order of the Red Banner for Labour; Red Star; Stalin Prize; Honored Worker of Science and Technology; Red Army 20 year service medal
- Other work: Professor at Kiev University

Nikolai Fedorovich Drozdov (Russian: Николай Фёдорович Дроздов; August 6, 1862 – December 29, 1953) was a Russian and Soviet scientist in the field of design of barrel artillery systems and internal ballistics, the founder of the School of Artillery Designers, Honored Worker of Science and Technology of the RSFSR (1940), full member of the Academy of Artillery Sciences, candidate mathematical sciences of the Russian Empire, Doctor of Technical Sciences (1938), professor, winner of the Stalin Prize of the first degree (1943). During World War I he was a Lieutenant-General of the Imperial Russian Army, and during the Great Patriotic War he was Colonel-General of the Artillery of the USSR (promoted 1944).

== Early life ==
Nikolai Fedorovich Drozdov was born in 1862 to a family of Old Believers in Surazh County. In 1881, he graduated high school and entered the Physics department of the St. Vladimir Imperial University of Kiev. In 1886, he graduated university and joined the 33rd Artillery Brigade of the Tsarist army. After passing an officer exam at Mikhailovsky Artillery School in 1887, Drozdov was commissioned into the 12th Regiment of Artillery as a lieutenant. In 1893, he was promoted to captain, and by 1904, he was a colonel. From 1898 to 1909, he served as a clerk with the Chief Artillery Directorate and frequently traveled abroad. In 1910, he was promoted to major general and served as an adviser to the Aeronautical Committee.

== World War I ==
During the First World War, Drozdov contributed to the development of artillery armament and the production of artillery. In 1914, he was appointed Assistant Chief of the Central Scientific and Technical Laboratory of the Military Department. In 1916, in connection with the continually disrupted delivery of military production, the factories were taken under government control, and Drozdov was appointed chief, then chairman of the Putilov factory. Simultaneously, from September 7, 1915, until 1918 Nikolai Drozdov became the head of the third department of technical artillery establishments of the State Automobile Inspectorate.

== Russian Civil War and Stalin era ==
In February 1918 Drozdov voluntarily joined the Red Army, and taught at the Military Artillery Academy of the Red Army. Since May 1919 he was an extraordinary professor, since December 1922 he became a senior leader, since April 1923 he became head of the ballistic department, and by July 1923 he was head of the ballistic faculty. In September 1924, he was head of the Faculty of Mechanical, and by October 1927 he was senior manager.

From October 1929 to July 1932 he was a teacher, after which he was appointed the head of a special technical cycle. In March 1933, he was Head of the Department of Design of Artillery Systems, since March 1935 he was the head of a special-technical cycle, and in August 1938, he became Professor of the Artillery Systems Design Department at the Artillery Academy.

Along with teaching, since October 1918 Drozdov was a consultant in the artillery department of the Scientific and Artillery Commission of the Main Administration of Shipbuilding. From March 1919, Drozdov worked in the Commission of Special Artillery Experiments (KOSARTOP), since 1922 - Assistant to the Director of the State Scientific and Technical Institute (former Central Scientific and Technical Laboratory), since 1924 - private lecturer at the Maritime Academy (until 1933).

== World War II and final years ==
During the Great Patriotic War, Drozdov taught at the Artillery Academy, and participated in the development and modernization of new artillery pieces of the Red Army. In April 1942, he was appointed deputy head of the Department of Design of Artillery Systems, since October 1943 - a permanent member of the Artillery Committee of the GAU.

After the war, Drozdov became a full member at the Presidium of the Academy of Artillery Sciences on September 28, 1946. Since November 12, 1946 he was a member of the presidium, and since December 1, 1950 - a scientific consultant . In May 1953, the Academy of Artillery Sciences was disbanded, and in June 1953, Drozdov retired.

Drozdov died on December 29, 1953, and was buried in the Novodevichy Cemetery.

== Scientific activity ==
While a student at the University of Kiev in 1881, Drozdov wrote his first scientific work - "The application of continuous fractions to the interpolation and decomposition of functions in series", for which he received a gold medal and a degree of candidate of mathematical sciences. In the Russian Empire Drozdov published a number of scientific works on the design of field guns. In the USSR Drozdov continued writing scientific works on the design of artillery guns, solving problems of internal ballistics, other problems of shooting artillery guns, the author of ballistic tables. For his contribution to the development of artillery equipment, in 1938 Drozdov was awarded the academic degree of Doctor of Technical Sciences without defending his dissertation.

== Scientific publications ==
- Designing of artillery pieces, Pg. 1922, part 1–2.
- Resistance of artillery pieces and their device, ed. 2nd, Pererab, L. 1932–1935, part 1–3.
- A special way to solve the basic problem of internal ballistics, L. 1929. (in co-authorship with NA Ugolnikov)
- Solving the problems of internal ballistics for smokeless powdered tubular form, M. 1941.
- Solving the problems of internal ballistics for charges of simple and complex, M. Acad. Art. Science. 1950.
- Solution of the problem of internal ballistics in generalized variables for charges of simple and composite, M. 1952.
- Solution of the equation of internal ballistics, L. 1936.
