= Ernest Appoga =

Soviet general and revolutionary

Ernest Fritzevich Appoga
- Born: 1898; Libau, Governorate of Livonia, Russian Empire
- Died: November 28, 1937 (aged 38–39) Kommunarka shooting ground, Moscow, Soviet Union
- Allegiance: Soviet Union
- Service years: 1918–1937
- Rank: Komkor
- Conflicts: Russian Civil War
- Other work: CPSU (1917–1937)

Ernest Fritzevich Appoga (Russian: Эрне́ст Фри́цевич Аппо́га, Latvian: Ernests Apoga; 1898 – November 28, 1937) was a Soviet general and revolutionary who was given the position of Komkor on November 11, 1935. He was born in present-day Latvia. He fought in the Russian Civil War in the Soviet Red Army. He was a recipient of the Order of the Red Banner and the Order of the Red Star.

During the Great Purge, as a part of the so-called "Latvian Operation", he was arrested on either May 22 or 23, 1937 and executed on either 26 or 28 November in Moscow. He was rehabilitated in 1956.

== Biography ==
He was born in 1898 in Libau, Governorate of Livonia, Russian Empire. He worked as a turner and machinist polisher at various factories in Libau, Petrograd, and Lysva.

He became a member of the Bolshevik Party in 1917 and participated in both the February and October Revolutions and was a member of the Red Guard and elected to the Council of Workers' Deputies. During the Civil War, he took part in battles against the forces of Kolchak and Denikin. He held the posts of military commissar of the Cherdyn region, commissar of the headquarters of the Ural Military District, military commissar of the 38th Infantry Division, chief of the department of the headquarters of the 9th Kuban Army and, from June to July 1920, chief of staff of the 10th Terek Army.

After the end of the Civil War he was assistant to the chief of staff of the North Caucasus Military District, chief of staff of the 37th Novocherkassk Rifle Division. From March 1923 he was assistant to the commander of the 9th Don Rifle Division. In 1924, he graduated from the Higher Academic Courses at the Military Academy of the Red Army.

From May 1924 he was head of the non-military training department of the Combat Training Directorate of the Red Army. From November 1924 he served as assistant inspector for non-military training of workers. In March 1925 he became head of the Directorate of the Moscow Military District.

From 1925 to 1927 he studied of at the Frunze Military Academy. Until April 1928, he was at the disposal of the Main Directorate of the Red Army. From April 1928 to July 1930 he was secretary of the administrative meetings of the Council of Labor and Defense of the USSR.

From 1930 to 1937 he served as Chief of the 3rd Directorate (Department) of the Headquarters (General Staff) of the Red Army, the Chief of Military Communications of the Red Army. From March 1933, he concurrently served as the head of the military communications department of the Red Army Military Transport Academy. He was also a member of the Military Council under the People's Commissar of Defense of the USSR.

He was arrested on either May 22 or May 23 of 1937 on charges of "participating in the fascist-Soviet military conspiracy and sabotage". On November 26 or 28, 1937, the Military Collegium of the Supreme Court of the USSR sentenced him to death. He was executed the same day. His wife, Klavdiya Petrovna Appoga (born in 1898), was sentenced to eight years in the camps in December 1937 as a member of the family of a traitor to the Motherland.

He was posthumously rehabilitated by the Military Collegium of April 18, 1956.

== Awards ==
- Order of the Red Banner (February 20, 1928)
- Order of the Red Star (1936)

== Bibliography ==
- Cherushev, Nikolai Semyonovich; Cherushev, Yury Nikolaevich (2012). Расстрелянная элита РККА (командармы 1-го и 2-го рангов, комкоры, комдивы и им равные): 1937—1941. Биографический словарь [Executed Elite of the Red Army (Komandarms of the 1st and 2nd ranks, Komkors, Komdivs, and equivalents) 1937–1941 Biographical Dictionary] (in Russian). Moscow: Kuchkovo Pole. ISBN 9785995002178.
