= Maksim Mager =

Soviet komkor (corps commander)

Maksim Petrovich Mager
- Native name: Максим Петрович Магер
- Born: 1897; Mogilev Governorate, Russian Empire
- Died: 16 October 1941 (aged 43–44) Soviet Union
- Allegiance: Soviet Union
- Branch: Soviet Red Army
- Service years: 1918–1938
- Rank: komkor
- Conflicts: Russian Civil War

Maksim Petrovich Mager (Russian: Макси́м Петро́вич Ма́гер; 1897 – 16 October 1941) was a Soviet komkor. He was born in the Orshansky Uyezd of Mogilev Governorate in the Russian Empire (present-day Belarus). He fought in the Soviet Red Army during the Russian Civil War. He was a recipient of the Order of Lenin (February 22, 1938) and the Order of the Red Banner.

During the Great Purge, Mager was arrested on September 10, 1938, and released on 9 February 1940. He was later re-arrested on 28 April 1941. As part of the Purge of the Red Army in 1941, he was sentenced to death by the Military Collegium of the Supreme Court of the Soviet Union and executed during the Battle of Moscow.

== Bibliography ==
- Cherushev, Nikolai Semyonovich; Cherushev, Yury Nikolaevich (2012). Расстрелянная элита РККА (командармы 1-го и 2-го рангов, комкоры, комдивы и им равные): 1937—1941. Биографический словарь [Executed Elite of the Red Army (Komandarms of the 1st and 2nd ranks, Komkors, Komdivs, and equivalents) 1937–1941 Biographical Dictionary] (in Russian). Moscow: Kuchkovo Pole. ISBN 9785995002178.
- Григорян А. М., Мильбах В. С., Чернавский А. Н. [in Russian] (2013). Политические репрессии командно-начальствующего состава, 1937—1938 гг. Ленинградский военный округ. СПб.: Издательство Санкт-Петербургского университета. ISBN 978-5-288-05282-8.
- Как ломали НЭП. Стенограммы пленумов ЦК ВКП(б) 1928—1929 гг. в 5-ти тт., Москва, 2000
- Советская историческая энциклопедия, тт. 1 — 16, Москва, 1961–1976
- Сборник лиц, награждённых Орденом Красного Знамени и Почётным Революционным Оружием, Москва, Государственное военное издательство, 1926
- Cherushev, Nikolai (2006). Из ГУЛАГа — в бой. Военные тайны XX века (5000 экз ed.). Moscow: Вече. ISBN 5-9533-1588-0.
