= Nikolay Kuybyshev =

- Николай Владимирович Куйбышев
- Born: 25 December 1893; Kokshetau, Akmolinsk Oblast, Russian Empire
- Died: 1 August 1938 (aged 44); Moscow, Soviet Union
- Other name: Kisanka(Chinese: 季山嘉)
- Military career
- Allegiance: Russian Empire; Soviet Union
- Branch: Imperial Russian Army; Red Army
- Service years: 1913–1917; 1918–1938
- Rank: Komkor
- Commands: 3rd Rifle Division; 9th Rifle Division; 2nd Caucasian Rifle Corps; Kronstadt fortress; Main Directorate of the Red Army; Siberian Military District; Transcaucasian Military District
- Conflicts: World War I Russian Civil War
- Awards: Order of the Red Banner (3)

Nikolay Vladimirovich Kuibyshev (Russian: Николай Владимирович Куйбышев; 25 December [O.S. 13 December] 1893 – 1 August 1938) was a Red Army military leader and Komkor.

The son of an Imperial Russian Army officer, Kuibyshev joined the army and fought in World War I. Kuibyshev joined the Red Army in 1918 and became commander of the 3rd and 9th Rifle Divisions on the Southern Front of the Russian Civil War. During the 1920s, Kuibyshev commanded a corps, courses for Red Army commanders, the group of Soviet advisors in China, and the Main Directorate of the Red Army, and the Siberian Military District. He became secretary for Rabkrin, the Workers' and Peasants' Inspectorate, and a member of the Party Control Commission during the 1930s. Kuibyshev became commander of the Transcaucasian Military District in 1937. During the Great Purge, he was arrested in February 1938 and executed in August. Kuibyshev was posthumously pardoned in 1956.

== Early life and World War I ==
Kuibyshev was born on 25 December 1893 in Kokshetau, the son of an army officer. He was future Soviet politician Valerian Kuibyshev's younger brother. Kuibyshev graduated from the Omsk Cadet Corps in 1912 and entered the Alexandrov Military School in Moscow. After the outbreak of World War I in 1914, Kuibyshev was prematurely discharged from the school and joined the Russian Imperial Army with the rank of Second lieutenant. He served with the 10th Malorossiya Grenadier Regiment as a company and then battalion commander. Kuibyshev was wounded three times during the war and after the February Revolution of 1917 was elected a member of the regimental committee. In November 1917, he became the regimental adjutant with the rank of captain.

== Russian Civil War ==
Kuibyshev served in the Red Army from the beginning of its existence, fighting on the Southern Front of the Russian Civil War. Between July and December 1918, Kuibyshev was a member of the Supreme Military Inspectorate. He became in a member of the Russian Communist Party in 1918. In January 1919, he became the military commissar of the 13th Army's 3rd Rifle Division. Between July and August he was acting commander of the division. In September, Kuibyshev became commander of the 9th Rifle Division's 3rd Brigade. He became commander of the division in January 1920, leading it until June 1921. In 1920, he was awarded the Order of the Red Banner. On 5 February 1921, Kuibyshev was awarded his second Order of the Red Banner, for his actions between September and November 1920, in which Kuibyshev's leadership was credited with saving the Donbas from a White attack and pushing the White troops back to Henichesk while capturing 5,000 prisoners.

== Interwar ==
Kuybyshev commanded the 2nd Caucasian Rifle Corps between June and October 1921. He entered the Higher Academic Courses at the Military Academy of the Red Army, graduating in March 1922. Kuybyshev then became the commandant of Kronstadt fortress and was awarded a third Order of the Red Banner during the same year. Between May 1923 and November 1924, he led the Higher Tactical-Infantry School (Vystrel) courses for Red Army commanders. In November 1924, Kuybyshev became assistant commander of the Turkestan Front, which was fighting against the Basmachi movement, a Muslim uprising in Central Asia. In October 1925 Kuybyshev was sent to China under the pseudonym "Kisanka"(Chinese: 季山嘉) as an advisor to Chiang Kai-shek's National Revolutionary Army, replacing Vasily Blyukher in command of the group of military advisors and specialists in China. Kuybyshev openly disdained the Chinese officers, considering them "ignorant in the arts of the war." In the spring of 1926, Chiang requested the dismissal of Kuybyshev and the early return of Blyukher to China.

Kuybyshev returned to the Soviet Union in July 1926 and became commander and military commissar of the 3rd Rifle Corps. In December, he became the chief of the Main Directorate of the Red Army, which oversaw Red Army combat training, the Inspectorate, mobilization, and recruitment. Between January and November 1928, Kuibyshev was the assistant commander of the Moscow Military District. He commanded the Siberian Military District between November 1928 and November 1929. In December 1929, he became the chief of the Main Directorate again.

Kuybyshev became the secretary of the administrative meetings of the Council of Labor and Defense in October 1930. At the same time, he was also a board member of the Rabkrin, the Workers' and Peasants' Inspectorate, and the chief of the Directorate of Military and Naval Inspection. Between February 1934 and March 1935, Kuybyshev was a member of the Party Control Commission and group leader for military and naval affairs. In April 1935, he became a member of the Bureau of the Party Control Commission.

In June 1937, Kuybyshev became commander of the Transcaucasian Military District.

== Arrest and execution ==
After the beginning of the Great Purge, Kuybyshev criticized it for undermining readiness in November, during a meeting of the district's Military Soviet. On 29 January 1938, Kuybyshev was arrested, based on information in confessions extracted from Mikhail Tukhachevsky, Vitaly Primakov, and Boris Feldman. Kuibyshev pleaded guilty to charges that he was involved in a "military-fascist conspiracy," and that he was a spy for the intelligence services of Germany, Poland, Japan, and Lithuania. He was sentenced to death by the Military Collegium for "participating in a military conspiracy" on 1 August 1938 and executed that same day at the Butovo firing range, where he was interred in a mass grave.

On 19 May 1956, he was posthumously pardoned by decision of the Military Collegium.
