= 131st Separate Motor Rifle Brigade =

Motor rifle brigade of the Soviet Ground Forces

9th Rifle Division (1918–1921; 1943–1946; 1954–1957)
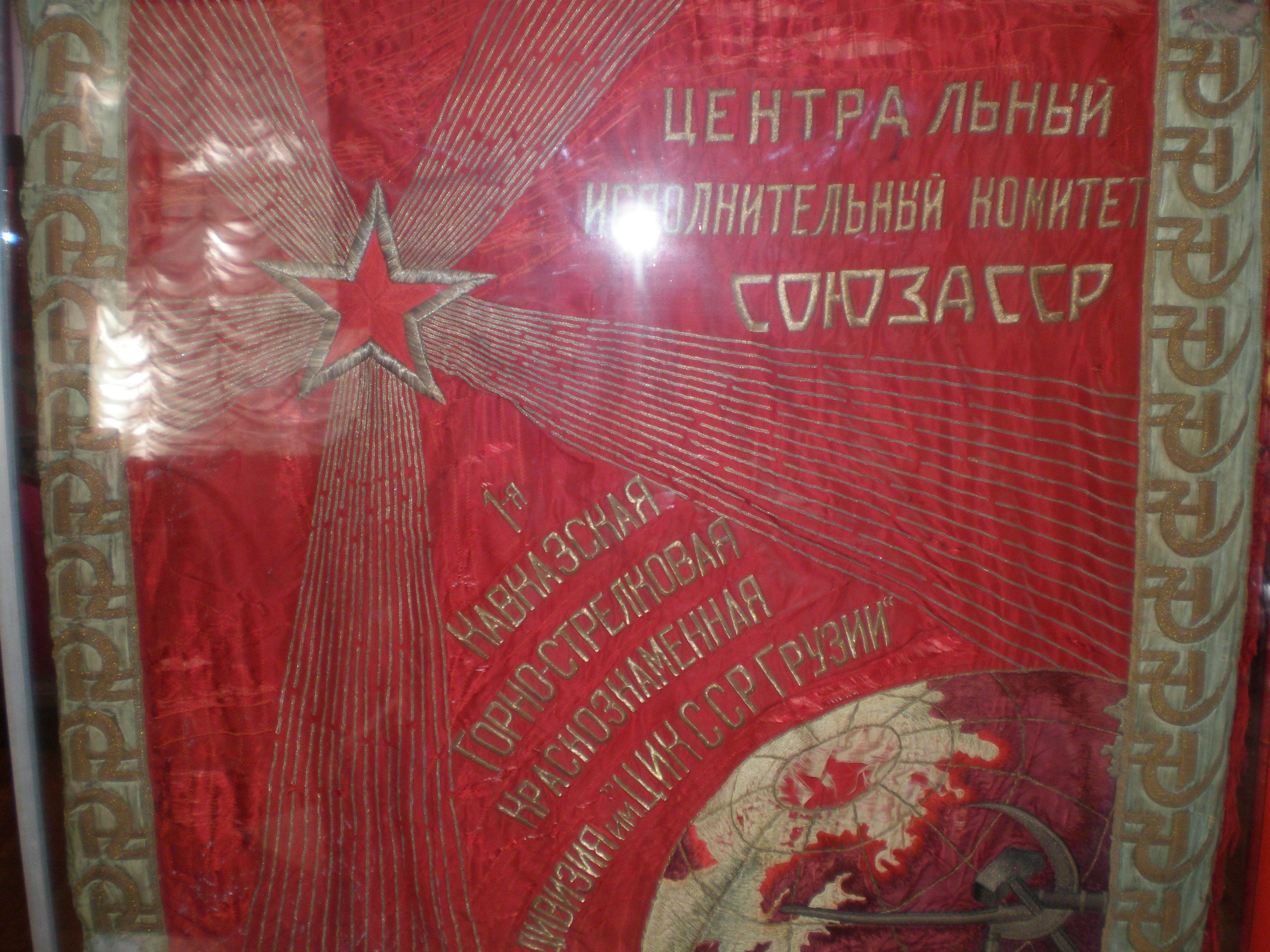
- 1st Caucasian Rifle Division (1922–1931) 1st Caucasian Mountain Rifle Division (1931–1936) 8th Rifle Brigade (1946–1949) 9th Mountain Rifle Division (1936–1943; 1949–1954) 80th Motor Rifle Division (1957–1964) 9th Motor Rifle Division (1964–1992) 131st Separate Motor Rifle Brigade (1992–2009)
- Active: 1918–2009
- Country: Soviet Union (1918–1992); Russia (1992–2009)
- Branch: Soviet Army (1918–1991); Russian Ground Forces (1991–2009)
- Type: Motorized Infantry
- Garrison/HQ: Maykop
- Engagements: Russian Civil War World War II: Battle of the Caucasus; Lvov-Sandomierz Offensive; Prague Offensive; East Prigorodny Conflict; First Chechen War Second Chechen War
- Decorations: Order of Kutuzov 2nd class; Order of the Red Star
- Battle honours: Krasnodar; On behalf of the Supreme Council of the Georgian SSR

Commanders
- Notable commanders: Ivan Alexeyevich Savin; Vladimir Zarudnitsky

The 131st Separate Motor Rifle Brigade (Russian: 131-я отдельная мотострелковая бригада, romanized: 131-ya otdelnaya motostrelkovaya brigada) was a motorised infantry unit of the Soviet Army and of the Russian Ground Forces.

The division traced its lineage back to the formation of the 1st Kursk Infantry Division in 1918 during the Russian Civil War. The division was redesignated as the 9th Rifle Division in October of that year, and fought as part of the Southern Front against the White Armed Forces of South Russia from late 1918 to early 1920. In late 1920 it fought in the Perekop–Chongar Operation, completing the defeat of the remaining White forces in Crimea, after which it participated in the Red Army invasion of Georgia in early 1921. The division was stationed in Georgia after the end of the campaign, guarding a sector of the Soviet border with Turkey. In late 1921 it was broken up into two separate rifle brigades, which were combined into the 1st Caucasian Rifle Division in 1922. The division was converted into a mountain unit in 1931, and was renumbered as the 9th Mountain Rifle Division in 1936.

Following the beginning of Operation Barbarossa, the German invasion of the Soviet Union during World War II, the division remained in its positions on the Turkish border, although elements of the 9th fought in the Battle of the Kerch Peninsula and the early stages of the Battle of the Caucasus. In late 1942 the entire division was relocated north to the front, fighting in the offensive that forced the withdrawal of German troops from the North Caucasus in early 1943, before spending most of the year fighting to capture the Kuban bridgehead. Reorganized as the 9th Krasnodar Plastun Division in September, the division transferred to Ukraine in early 1944, after which it fought in the Lvov–Sandomierz Offensive, Vistula–Oder Offensive, and Prague Offensive before the end of the war in May 1945.

Postwar, the division was relocated to Krasnodar in the North Caucasus and was reduced to a rifle brigade until 1949, when it became the 9th Mountain Rifle Division again. After moving to Maykop in 1950, the 9th became a regular rifle division again in 1954, and converted into the 80th Motor Rifle Division in 1957. In 1964 its historic World War II designation was restored, and the division spent the rest of the Cold War in Maykop. After the Dissolution of the Soviet Union, the 9th transferred to the Russian Ground Forces and reorganized as the 131st Separate Motor Rifle Brigade in late 1992. The brigade fought in the Battle of Grozny during the First Chechen War, and elements of it served in the Second Chechen War. In 2009, after the Russo-Georgian War, it was relocated to Gudauta in the disputed territory of Abkhazia, and was redesignated the 7th Military Base.

== Russian Civil War and Interwar period ==
The 9th Kursk Infantry Division was created on the 20 July 1918 as one of the first divisions of the Soviet Union during the Russian Civil War. The division was stationed in the Caucasus region, later the Transcaucasian Military District and soon renamed 9th Infantry, and later 9th Rifle division. In 1922 the division was renamed the 1st Caucasus ('Kavkaz') Rifle Division.

After service during the Civil War, during which the division changed its name numerous times, the division was awarded the honorific name "of the Central Executive Committee of the Georgian Soviet Socialist Republic" (Russian: ЦИК ССР Грузии) in 1928. For the 10th anniversary of Red Army on February 29, 1928, the division was awarded the Revolutionary Red Banner of Honor and added the Red Banner (Krasnoznamennaya) to its title.

During 1931 the division was reorganised into a mountain rifle division.

On 23 February 1936 the division was awarded the Order of the Red Star and on the 23 February the name was slightly changed to "of the Supreme Soviet of the Georgian Soviet Socialist Republic". In July of the same year the division was renamed again as the 9th Red Banner Mountain Rifle Division.

== Second World War combat history ==
Before the war the division consisted of the following units:

- 36th Rifle Regiment (later, as the 36th Motor Rifle Regiment, a Georgian national unit. Originally 309th Caucasian infantry regiment.)
- 121st Rifle Regiment
- 93rd Rifle Regiment
- 256th Artillery Regiment
- 1448th Self-Propelled Gun Regiment
- 55th Separate Anti-Tank Battalion
- 26th reconnaissance company
- 140th self-propelled artillery gun battalion
- 232nd separate communications battalion (and 1432nd separate communications company)
- 123rd Medical Battalion
- 553rd separate company of chemical defence
- 161st auto-transportation company
- 104th Field Bakery
- 156th divisional veterinary treatment station
- 203rd Field Post Office
- 216th Field Cash Office of the State Bank

The division began the war in the Transcaucasian Military District with the 40th Rifle Corps alongside the 31st Rifle Division. During the war the division was at various times serving as part of the 46th, 37th, 56th, Separate Coastal, 69th, 18th, 5th Guards Army and 60th Armies. The division took part in the Battle of the Caucasus. The division participated in the fighting for Feodosiya, Tuapse, in the Kuban and Taman Peninsula, and Kraków.

On September 3, 1943, for the liberation of Kuban region and the capital of the region, Krasnodar, the division was awarded the honorary name “Krasnodarskaya”, and the division was reformed again and became known as the 9th Plastunskaya Krasnodar Red Banner, Order of Red Star Rifle Division (Russian: 9-я пластунская стрелковая Краснодарская Краснознамённая, ордена Красной Звезды дивизия). Its enlisted and non-commissioned personnel came largely from the cossacks of the Kuban region.

During the period 1944 – 1945 the division participated in the Lvov-Sandomierz Offensive (13 July – 29 August 1944 also known as the 6th Stalin's Shock), and the liberation of Poland and Czechoslovakia for which in April 1945 the division was awarded the Order of Kutuzov 2nd class. With 60th Army of the 4th Ukrainian Front in May 1945.

Its full title in 1945 was Кrasnodar Red Banner, Order of Kutuzov, Red Star Supreme Soviet of the Georgian SSR.

== Post-war service history ==
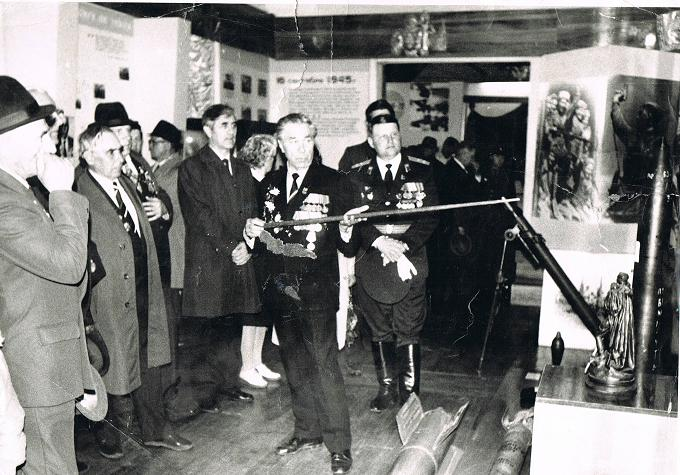
Colonel Alexander Dorofeyeev in Maykop, 1988.

After the war the division was returned to Krasnodar, and in 1950 the division was relocated to Maykop. After the reforms of 1956 the division became the 9th Motor Rifle Division and was based at Maykop for many years.

On 12 September 1992 the division was reorganised as the 131st Separate Motor Rifle order of Kutuzov and Red Star Brigade of the 67th Army Corps, North Caucasus Military District (Russian: 131 Отдельная мотострелковая орденов Кутузова и красной Звезды бригада (ОМСБ)). The brigade participated in the First Chechen War of 1994–96, including the New Year 1995 assault on Grozniy during the combat for the railway terminal where it suffered severe casualties in dead and wounded following an ambush by superior enemy numbers. The battle for Grozny cost 157 casualties, including 24 officers (including Colonel Savin), one warrant officer (Russian: прапорщик) and 60 NCOs and soldiers killed and 12 officers, one warrant officer and 59 NCOs and soldiers missing (presumed dead). The brigade also lost 22 T-72 tanks, 45 BMP-2s, and 37 cars and trucks. although other sources give higher losses attributed to the 81st Motor Rifle Regiment which participated in the operation. The brigade was forced to withdraw from combat, was surrounded, and forced to abandon all of its equipment, with the personnel escaping individually or in small groups. From March 1995 the brigade participates in the Gudermes operation. In all the brigade suffered 1,282 casualties during the campaign.

On 26 April 1995 the brigade returned to Adygeya but was recalled to combat service three months later to participate in further operations in Chechnya, eventually as two manoeuvre groups from 20 February to 7 October 1996.

Since the Chechnya campaigns the brigade has remained in the Caucasus region, and has again changed its name to 131st Separate Motor-Rifle Krasnodar Red Banner, Order of Kutuzov and Red Star Kuban cossack brigade (Russian: 131-й отдельная мотострелковая Краснодарская Краснознаменная, орденов Кутузова и Красной Звезды Кубанская казачья бригада) Two of its battalions are participating in the occupation missions in Georgia in the regions of Urta and along the Abkhazian-Georgian border. These battalions and the brigade's tank battalion are staffed completely with professional service personnel serving under the new contracts. The brigade has achieved first place in the performance assessment within the military district during 2005.

In 2009, it became the 7th Military Base.

== Brigade commanders ==
- Vasily Glagolev (1918)
- Pyotr Solodukhin (1919–1920)
- Nikolay Kuibyshev (1920–1921)
- Mikhail Velikanov (1922–1922)
- Dmitry Fesenko (1927–1930)
- Mikhail Kovalyov (1931–1932)
- Colonel Vsevolod Sergeyev (08.1937 — 04.1939)
- Colonel V. T. Maslov (1939–1941)
- Colonel V. S. Dzabakhidze (1941–42)
- Colonel M. V.Yevstigneyev (1942–43)
- Colonel A. E. Shapovalov (1943)
- Colonel S. M. Chorniy (1943)
- Colonel, from October 1943, General-Major P. I. Metal'nikov (1943–45)
- Colonel I. A. Savin (1994–95)
- Colonel Oleg Kozlov (1995–96)
- Vladimir Zarudnitsky (1998-2001)
- Major-General S. G. Sudakov (August 2004–2009)
