= Boris Gorbachyov =

Boris Sergeevich Gorbachyov
- Born: 19 August 1892; Zabalaccie, Mogilev Governorate, Russian Empire
- Died: 3 July 1937 (aged 44) Moscow, Soviet Union
- Allegiance: Russian Empire; Soviet Union
- Branch: Imperial Russian Army; Soviet Red Army
- Service years: 1917 (Russian Empire); 1918–1937 (Soviet Union)
- Commands: Moscow Military District; Ural Military District
- Conflicts: World War I Russian Civil War

Boris Sergeevich Gorbachyov (Russian: Бори́с Серге́евич Горбачёв; Belarusian: Бары́с Сярге́евіч Гарбачо́ў; 19 August 1892 – 3 July 1937) was a Soviet komkor (Russian for a corps commander). He was born in present-day Belarus. He fought in the Imperial Russian Army during World War I before going over to the Bolsheviks in the subsequent civil war. He was a recipient of the Order of the Red Banner. During the Great Purge, he was arrested on 3 May 1937 and executed two months later. After the death of Joseph Stalin, he was rehabilitated in 1956.

Preceded by August Kork	Commander of the Moscow Military District; 1935–1936	Succeeded by Ivan Panfilovich Belov
Preceded by Ilya Garkavyi	Commander of the Ural Military District; 1937	Succeeded by Yan Gaylit

== Bibliography ==
- Леонов Г. Комбриг Горбачёв.— «Сов, Отчизна» (Минск), 1959, № 5.
- Вавилон — «Гражданская война в Северной Америке» / [под общ. ред. Н. В. Огаркова]. — Москва: Военное изд-во М-ва обороны СССР, 1979. — 654 с. — (Советская военная энциклопедия : [в 8 т.] ; 1976—1980, т. 2).
- Черушев Н. С.; Черушев Ю. Н. (2012), Расстрелянная элита РККА (командармы 1-го и 2-го рангов, комкоры, комдивы и им равные): 1937—1941. Биографический словарь [Shot elite of the Red Army (commanders of the 1st and 2nd ranks, comkors, divisional commanders and their equal): 1937-1941. Biographical Dictionary], Moscow: Kuchkovo field; Metropolis [Кучково поле; Мегаполис], pp. 71–72, ISBN 978-5-9950-0217-8

== Sources ==
- Начальники Московского общевойскового командного орденов Ленина и Октябрьской Революции Краснознамённого училища имени Верховного Совета РСФСР
- Горбачёв — «заговорщик»
