= Boris Feldman =

Soviet general and politician (1890–1937)

Boris Mironovich Feldman Борис Миронович Фельдман
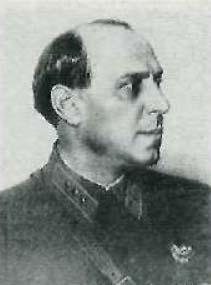

Personal details
- Born: 1890 Pinsk, Minsk Governorate, Russian Empire
- Died: June 12, 1937 (aged 46–47) Moscow, Soviet Union
- Party: CPSU (1920–1937)
- Occupation: military leader, revolutionary, politician

Military service
- Allegiance: Soviet Union
- Branch/service: Army
- Years of service: 1918–1937
- Rank: Komkor

Boris Mironovich Feldman (Russian: Борис Миронович Фельдман) (1890 – June 12, 1937) was a Soviet military commander and politician. He was executed during the Great Purge and rehabilitated during the Khrushchev Thaw.

== Early years ==
Feldman was born in Pinsk, Minsk Governorate into a Jewish family. As a young man he sympathized with the revolutionary movement and was repeatedly arrested.

In 1913 he was mobilized into the Imperial Russian Army. As an ordinary soldier he participated in the First World War (1914–1917).

== Red Army career ==
In May 1918 he joined the Red Army. In 1918 he was the secretary of the headquarters of the Army's Bryansk region, from February 1919 he was a student at the Academy of the General Staff of the Red Army, and, in the same year, he rose to being assistant chief of the operational department of the 13th army, while in June–September he was chief of staff of the 1st brigade of the 9th rifle division.

In 1920 he became a member of the Communist Party of the Soviet Union. In May 1920, he was first assistant chief, then chief of staff of the 57th rifle division, and then in September–December, the head of the 55th rifle division. After the division was folded into the 55th separate rifle brigade, he remained its chief until the end of June 1921.

In October–December 1921, he commanded the Expeditionary Corps, which participated in the suppression of the Tambov peasant uprising. In May–July 1922 he was the Chief of Staff of the People's Revolutionary Army of the Far Eastern Republic.

In 1922–1925 he was the commander of the 17th, then in 1925–1928 he commanded the 19th rifle corps. In 1927, he was on a study trip to Germany for two months. In 1928–1934 he was chief of staff of the Leningrad Military District. In 1932, together with Mikhail Tukhachevsky, he went to large Reichswehr maneuvers in Germany. From 1934 to 1937, Feldman was the head of the Directorate for the Commanding Staff of the Red Army and a member of the Military Council under the People's Commissar of Defense of the USSR. With the introduction of personal military ranks in 1935, he was awarded the military rank of commander. On 15 April 1937 was named assistant manager of the military district of Moscow.

== Arrest, execution and rehabilitation ==
In May 1937, Feldman was transferred to the post of deputy commander of the troops of the Moscow Military District, and on May 15 he was arrested, after which he was removed from all posts and expelled from the CPSU (b). He was shot on June 12, 1937, together with Tukhachevsky, Iona Yakir and other military leaders in the basement of the building of the Military Collegium of the Supreme Court of the USSR.

He was buried in Donsk cemetery, Moscow. His son ended up in the Nizhneisetsky orphanage.

He was rehabilitated posthumously under Nikita Khrushchev on January 31, 1957, and reinstated in the party.

== See also ==
- Case of the Trotskyist Anti-Soviet Military Organization
