= Stepan Bogomyagkov =

Stepan Nikolaevich Bogomyagkov
- Native name: Степан Николаевич Богомягков
- Born: 31 December 1890; Okhansky Uyezd, Perm Governorate, Russian Empire
- Died: September 1966; Soviet Union
- Allegiance: Russian Empire; Soviet Union
- Service / branch: Imperial Russian Army; Soviet Red Army
- Rank: Komkor
- Battles / wars: World War I Russian Civil War

Stepan Nikolaevich Bogomyagkov (Russian: Степан Николаевич Богомягков; 31 December 1890 – September 1966) was a Soviet komkor (corps commander). He fought in the Imperial Russian Army in World War I before going over to the Bolsheviks in the subsequent civil war. He was promoted to Komkor on 11 November 1935. During the Great Purge, he was arrested in February 1938. Unlike many of his colleagues, he was not executed. In 1941, he was sentenced to 10 years in a labor camp. He was released in 1948 after seven years and lived in retirement in his home region of Perm Oblast. He was not reinstated in the army but did receive a pension.

== Bibliography ==
- Cherushev, Nikolai (2003). 1937 год: элита Красной Армии на Голгофе. Военные тайны XX века. Moscow: Veche. ISBN 5-94538-305-8.
- Cherushev, Nikolai; Cherushev, Yuri (2012). Расстрелянная элита РККА (командармы 1-го и 2-го рангов, комкоры, комдивы и им равные): 1937—1941. Биографический словарь [Executed Elite of the Red Army (Komandarms of the 1st and 2nd ranks, Komkors, Komdivs, and equivalents) 1937–1941 Biographical Dictionary] (in Russian). Moscow: Kuchkovo Pole. pp. 59–61. ISBN 9785995002178.

== Sources ==
Репрессии в Красной Армии
