= Ilya Garkavy =

Ilya Ivanovich Garkavy
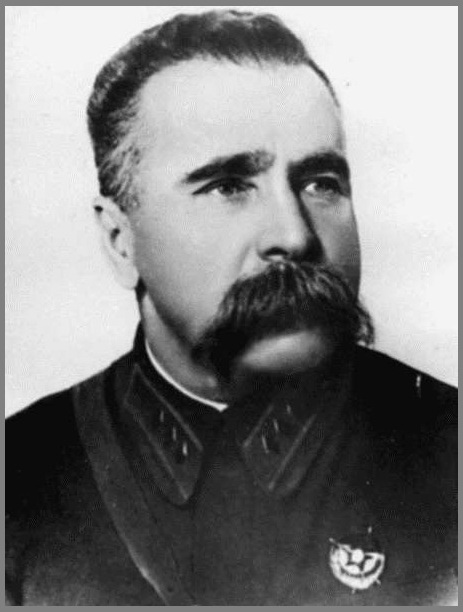
- Born: July 19, 1888; Yekaterinoslav Governorate, Russian Empire
- Died: July 1, 1937 (aged 48) Soviet Union
- Allegiance: Russian Empire; Soviet Union
- Branch: Imperial Russian Army; Soviet Red Army
- Service years: 1914–1917 (Russian Empire); 1918–1937 (Soviet Union)
- Rank: Komkor

Ilya Ivanovich Garkavy (Russian: Илья Иванович Гарькавый; Ukrainian: Ілля Іванович Гаркавий; 1888–1937) was a Soviet komkor (corps commander) and organizer of Red Guards detachments in Tiraspol.

He fought in the Imperial Russian Army during World War I before going over to the Bolsheviks in the subsequent Civil War. He was a recipient of the Order of the Red Banner. During the Great Purge, he was arrested on March 11, 1937 alongside fellow komkor Matvei Vasilenko. Both were later executed.

== Bibliography ==
- Черушев Н. С. (2003). 1937 год: элита Красной Армии на Голгофе. Военные тайны XX века. М.: Вече. p. 560. ISBN 5-94538-305-8.
- Черушев Н. С.; Черушев Ю. Н. (2012), Расстрелянная элита РККА (командармы 1-го и 2-го рангов, комкоры, комдивы и им равные): 1937—1941. Биографический словарь [Shot elite of the Red Army (commanders of the 1st and 2nd ranks, comkors, divisional commanders and their equal): 1937-1941. Biographical Dictionary], Moscow: Kuchkovo field; Metropolis [Кучково поле; Мегаполис], pp. 67–68, ISBN 978-5-9950-0217-8

== Sources ==
- БСЭ
- 74-я Краснознаменная Нижнеднепровская гвардейская стрелковая дивизия

Preceded by Sergei Mrachkovsky	Commander of the Ural Military District; 1935–1937	Succeeded by Boris Gorbachyov
