= Georgy Bazilevich =

Soviet komkor (corps commander)

Georgy Dmitrievich Bazilevich
- Born: 26 January 1889; Krysky, Chernigov Governorate, Russian Empire
- Died: 3 March 1939 (aged 50); Soviet Union
- Military career
- Allegiance: Russian Empire; Soviet Union
- Branch: Imperial Russian Army; Soviet Red Army
- Rank: Komkor
- Conflicts: World War I Russian Civil War

Georgy Dmitrievich Bazilevich (Russian: Гео́ргий Дми́триевич Базиле́вич; 26 January 1889 – 3 March 1939) was a Soviet komkor (corps commander). He fought for the Imperial Russian Army during World War I before going over to the Bolsheviks in the subsequent Civil War. He was awarded the Order of the Red Banner (1924) and the Order of the Red Star (1938). During the Great Purge, he was arrested on 23 November 1938 and later executed. After the death of Joseph Stalin, he was rehabilitated in 1955.

== Early years ==
Georgy Dmitrievich Bazilevich was born on 26 January 1889 in the village of Kriski, Novgorod-Seversky district, Chernigov Governorate into a peasant family. Later the family moved to Novgorod-Seversky.

After graduating from high school in 1908, he entered the Kiev Military School, from which he graduated in 1910. He was promoted to officer and sent to the Pernovsky 3rd Grenadier Regiment, stationed in Moscow. In addition to his official duties, Bazilevich served as a regimental librarian. In 1913 he entered the military department of the Moscow Air School. At the final exam in aerobatics, his plane crashed. After treatment in the hospital, he returned to his unit.

During the First World War, he fought as part of the 211th Nikolsky Infantry Regiment on the South-Western Front, where he commanded a company and a battalion. During the fighting he received six wounds. For the skillful leadership of units, personal courage and courage, Bazilevich was awarded eight military awards. After the February Revolution, Lieutenant Colonel Bazilevich was elected to the post of deputy chairman of the executive committee of the Special Army. In the autumn of 1917, he was seriously wounded during a German air raid.

== Soviet career ==
In October 1917 he joined the Bolshevik fraction of the Russian Social Democratic Labour Party ("RSDLP(b)"), and from March 1918 he served in the ranks of the Red Army. In 1918, he was successively appointed to the positions of battalion commander of the Exemplary Soviet detachment of the Southern Front, assistant regiment commander and member of the Higher Military Inspectorate, and at the end of August 1918 to the post of commander of the Balashovo-Kamyshinskaya group of troops. From October 1918 to May 1919 he was a member of the Revolutionary Military Council of the 8th Army. In 1919, after a serious injury and illness, Bazilevich was appointed to the post of head of the 2nd Moscow Infantry Courses. In August 1919, he formed a reserve army, with which he joined the Special Group under the command of Shorin. Bazilevich commanded the combat sectors of the South-Eastern Front.

In January 1920 he was appointed to the post of commander of the troops of the Don region, and in April 1920 - to the post of commander of the troops of the North Caucasian Military District. While in this position, Bazilevich led the liquidation of the expeditionary force under the command of General Wrangel near the village of Kushchevskaya. From the end of August 1920 he commanded the Reserve Army of the Caucasian Front, and from September of the same year the Ukrainian Reserve Army. The military formations led by Bazilevich took part in the fight against banditry, the organization of food detachments, the provision of assistance to railway transport, and the organization of supplies to the regions of Donbas.

From the end of 1920 to 1921, Bazilevich served as Chief Supply Officer of the Red Army - Chairman of the RVSR Stock Commission. From 1922 to 1923, Bazilevich was at the disposal of the Revolutionary Military Council of the Republic and the Headquarters of the Red Army. At this time, he served as head of the Gokhran and chairman of the Russian Gems trust. He led the work to find funds within the country, during which royal treasures were discovered.

In 1923 he was appointed to the post of commander of a demonstration training squadron of the Workers and Peasants' Red Fleet, and in June 1924 to the post of assistant commander of the Moscow Military District. From July 1925 he was at the Revolutionary Military Council of the USSR for especially important assignments. In November 1925, Bazilevich was appointed to the post of commander of the Moscow Military District, in May 1927 he was named to the post of commander of the Volga Military District. Under his leadership, the district every year occupied higher and higher places in terms of the level of combat training throughout the Red Army. In April 1931 he was appointed to the post of Secretary of the Defense Commission under the Council of People's Commissars of the USSR, transformed in 1937 into the Defense Committee under the Council of People's Commissars of the USSR.

Bazilevich was a member of the Central Executive Committee of the USSR and the Party Control Commission under the Central Committee of the All-Union Communist Party of Bolsheviks. He was a deputy of the Supreme Soviet of the USSR of the 1st convocation.

== Execution and rehabilitation ==
Bazilevich was arrested on 23 November 1938. During the investigation, he did not admit guilt and did not testify against other persons, despite the "use of methods of physical influence". On 3 March 1939 the Military Collegium of the Supreme Court of the USSR sentenced him to death on charges of participating in a military conspiracy. The sentence was carried out on the same day. He was rehabilitated by the Military Collegium of the Supreme Court of the USSR on 27 July 1955.

Preceded by Andrei Snesarev	Commander of the North Caucasus Military District; 1920	Succeeded by Kliment Voroshilov
Preceded by Kliment Voroshilov	Commander of the Moscow Military District; 1925–1927	Succeeded by Boris Shaposhnikov
Preceded by Alexander Sedyakin	Commander of the Volga Military District; 1927–1931	Succeeded by Boris Shaposhnikov
