= Semyon Pugachov =

Russian soldier

Semyon Andreevich Pugachov
- Семён Андреевич Пугачёв
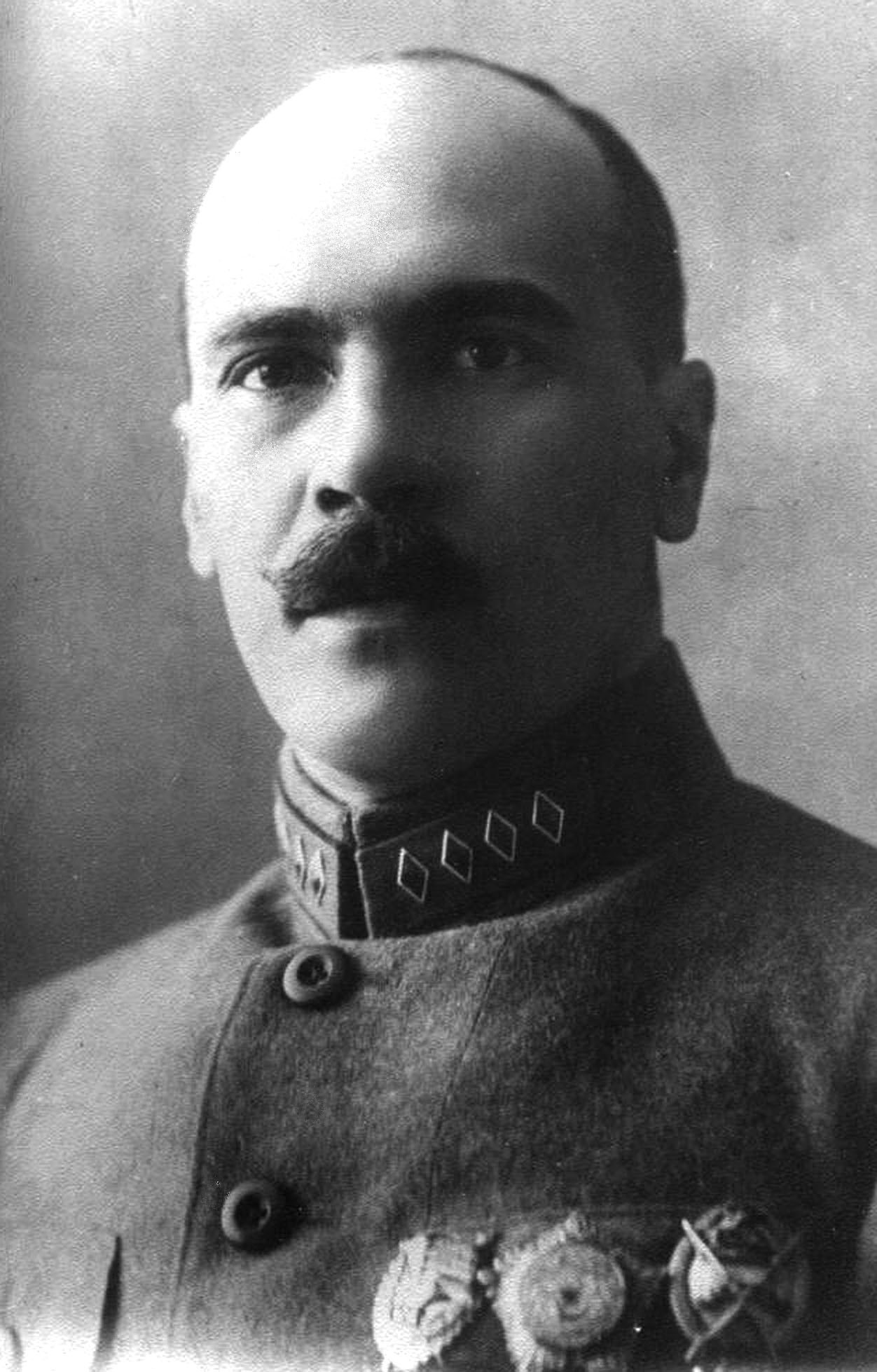
- Born: 26 February 1889; Ryazan, Russian Empire
- Died: 23 March 1943 (aged 54)
- Military career
- Allegiance: Russian Empire (Soviet Union) Red Army; RSFSR
- Service years: (Russian Empire) 1906-1917 (Soviet Union) 1918-1938
- Rank: Comkor
- Conflicts: World War I Russian Civil War Basmachi Movement

Semyon Andreevich Pugachov (Russian: Семён Андреевич Пугачёв; 26 February 1889 – 23 March 1943) was a Russian soldier who served in the Russian Imperial and Soviet armed forces. He served in World War I and obtained the rank of Komkor in the Red Army.

== Biography ==
Semyon was born in Ryazan to a family of a teacher. He joined the Russian Army on 10 July 1906, and graduated from the Alexseevskoe Military School in 1908, and the Nikolaevskoie Military Academy in 1914.

During World War I, Semyon was a Captain and fought alongside the 6th Siberian Corps, and then became part of the operational staff management of the Northern Front.

=== Service in the Red Army ===
After the Russian Revolution in April 1918, Pugachov volunteered to join the Red Army, and served in several Soviet military districts across the country.

He served in the staff of the Ural Military District, performing special tasks assigned by his commanding officers, and soon after, became Chief of Staff of the district. At the start of 1919, Pugachov became Chief of Operations for the 2nd Army in the far east, and in September, became Chief of Staff for the Special Group of the Southern Front. In October, he was assigned as Chief of Operations for the Southeastern Front, and the Caucasian Front in 1920, through to May 1921. His main task was to guide the development plan to expel and defeat the forces of the White Army from the North Caucasus. In June, he was appointed as Chief of the Separate Caucasus Army.

From August 1923 to April 1924, Pugachov served as commander to the Turkestan Front and helped combat the Basmachi Movement.

In May 1924, he commanded the Red Banner Caucasian Army, and from 1925 to 1928, he served as replacement for the Chief of the RKKA and aided in certain reforms done by Mikhail Frunze from 1924-1925. He also took part in suppressing the August Uprising in Georgia.

From 1927 to 1928, he was a military advisor to the Geneva conference on arms reduction, and from 1928 to 1930, he was Chief of the Ukrainian and Central Asian military districts.

In September 1932, he was appointed as Chief of the Military-Transport Academy of the RKKA.

He joined the Communist Party of the Soviet Union in 1934, after being recommended by Grigoriy Ordzhonikidze.

=== Awards ===
- Order of the Red Banner,
- Order of the Red Banner of the Khorezm People's Soviet Republic,
- Order of the Red Star of the Bukharan People's Soviet Republic, 1st Class.

== Arrests and death ==
Pugachov was arrested twice; the first time was on 28 February/1 March 1931. He admitted his guilt on 11 March; however, after a confrontation with Sergei Georgevich Bejanov the next day, he refused from readings presented earlier. He was released on the same day.

He was arrested a second time on 10 October 1938 and was sentenced to 15 years of jail on 25 October. He died in prison on 23 March 1943 when he was 54 years old and was posthumously rehabilitated in 1956.

== Sources ==
Semyon Andreevich Pugachov in Russian Army in the Great War .
"Semyon Andreevich Pugachov" on Chronus.
Executed Generation, Semyon Andreevich Pugachov.
CentreAsia, Semyon Andreevich Pugachov.
PomniPro, Semyon Andreevich Pugachov

== See also ==
- Basmachi Movement
- RKKA
- Russian Civil War
