= Stepan Zotov =

Soviet military commander (1882–1938)

Stepan Andeeevich Zotov
- Born: November 23, 1882; Russian Empire
- Died: September 29, 1938 (aged 55) Moscow, Soviet Union
- Allegiance: Russian Empire; Soviet Union
- Branch: Imperial Russian Army; Soviet Red Army
- Service years: 1904–1917 (Russian Empire); 1918–1938 (Soviet Union)
- Rank: Komkor
- Conflicts: World War I Russian Civil War

Stepan Andeeevich Zotov (November 23, 1882 – September 29, 1938) was a Soviet komkor (corps commander). He fought in the Russian Imperial Army in World War I before going over to the Bolsheviks in the subsequent civil war. He was a recipient of the Cross of St. George, the Order of the Red Banner and the Order of the Red Star. He was made a komkor on November 23, 1935. He died in a Moscow military hospital during a surgical operation.

== Bibliography ==
- Зотов Б. И. (1977). Цветы горьких трав (100 000 экз ed.). Волгоград: Ниж.-Волж. кн. изд-во. p. 272.

== Sources ==
- Зотов Степан Андреевич на сайте города Калача-на-Дону
