= Andrei Sazontov =

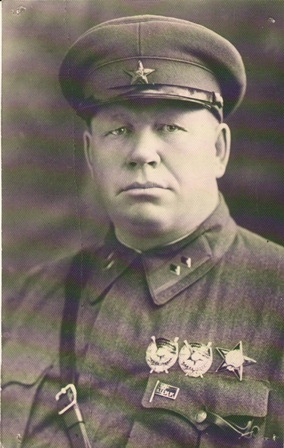
- Born: 1894; Vyatka Governorate, Russian Empire
- Died: August 26, 1938; Moscow Oblast, Soviet Union
- Allegiance: Russian Empire; Soviet Union
- Service / branch: Imperial Russian Army; Soviet Red Army
- Rank: Komkor
- Commands: 13th Rifle Corps; 4th Rifle Corps
- Battles / wars: World War I Russian Civil War

Andrei Sazontov (1894 – August 26, 1938) was a Soviet komkor (corps commander). He fought for the Imperial Russian Army during World War I before going over to the Bolsheviks. He was a recipient of the Order of the Red Banner (twice) and the Order of the Red Star. During the Great Purge, he was arrested on May 26, 1938, and executed three months later at Kommunarka.

| Preceded by Semyon Uritsky | Commander of the 13th Rifle Corps; February 1934 – 1935 | Succeeded by |
| Preceded by Danilo Srdić | Commander of the 4th Rifle Corps; September 1935 – May 1937 | Succeeded by Trifon Shevaldin |
