= Matvei Vasilenko =

Soviet komkor (corps commander)

Matvei Ivanovich Vasilenko
- Native name: Матвей Иванович Василенко
- Born: 25 November [O.S. 13 November] 1888; Russian Empire
- Died: 1 July 1937; Soviet Union
- Allegiance: Russian Empire; Soviet Union
- Service / branch: Imperial Russian Army; Soviet Red Army
- Rank: Komkor
- Commands: 9th Army; 11th Army; 14th Army; 45th Rifle Division
- Battles / wars: World War I Russian Civil War; Polish–Soviet War

Matvei Ivanovich Vasilenko (Russian: Матвей Иванович Василенко; Ukrainian: Матвій Іванович Василенко; 25 November [O.S. 13 November] 1888 – 1 July 1937) was a Soviet komkor (corps commander).

He fought in the Imperial Russian Army during World War I before going over to the Bolsheviks in the subsequent Civil War. He also fought in the war against Poland.
He commanded the 11th Army (19 December 1919 — 29 March 1920), the 9th Army (April 5 - July 19, 1920), again the 11th Army (26 July — 12 September 1920) and the 14th Army (27 September–15 November 1920).

He was a recipient of the Order of the Red Banner and the Order of the Red Star.

During the Great Purge, he was arrested on 11 March 1937. On 26 June 1937, Vasilenko's name appeared on an execution list signed by Joseph Stalin, Lazar Kaganovich, Kliment Voroshilov, Andrei Zhdanov and Anastas Mikoyan. He was later executed. In 1956, he was rehabilitated.

== Bibliography ==
- Кадишев А. Б. Интервенция и гражданская война в Закавказье. — М., 1960.
- Лаппо Д. Д. В красно-белом отсвете трагедии. Воронежская губерния (1917—1920 гг.) — Воронеж: Центрально-Черноземное книжное издательство, 1993. — с. 205–207.
- Suvenirov, Oleg (1998). Трагедия РККА 1937—1938 [Tragedy of the Red Army 1937–1938] (in Russian). Moscow: TERRA. ISBN 5300022209.
- Сухоруков В. Т. XI армия в боях на Северном Кавказе и Нижней Волге 1918—1920 гг. — М., 1961.
- Cherushev, Nikolai Semyonovich; Cherushev, Yury Nikolaevich (2012). Расстрелянная элита РККА (командармы 1-го и 2-го рангов, комкоры, комдивы и им равные): 1937—1941. Биографический словарь [Executed Elite of the Red Army (Komandarms of the 1st and 2nd ranks, Komkors, Komdivs, and equivalents) 1937–1941 Biographical Dictionary] (in Russian). Moscow: Kuchkovo Pole. ISBN 9785995002178.
- Страница военно-патриотического клуба «Память» Воронежского госуниверситета

Preceded by Ilya Garkavyi	Commander of the 45th Rifle Division; 1924–1929	Succeeded by Anton Borisenko
