= Semyon Uritsky =

Soviet general

Semyon Petrovich Uritsky
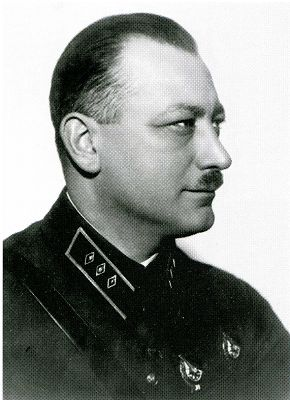
- Born: 2 March 1895; Cherkassy, Russian Empire (today in Ukraine)
- Died: 1 August 1938 (aged 43); Moscow, Soviet Union
- Military career
- Allegiance: Russian Empire; Soviet Union
- Branch: Imperial Russian Army; Soviet Red Army
- Service years: 1915–1917 (Russian Empire); 1918–1937 (Soviet Union)
- Rank: Komkor
- Commands: 13th Rifle Corps
- Conflicts: World War I Russian Civil War

Semyon Petrovich Uritsky (Russian: Семён Петро́вич Ури́цкий; 2 March 1895 – 1 August 1938) was a Soviet general. He fought in the Imperial Russian Army during World War I before going over to the Bolsheviks. He was promoted to the rank of Komkor on 11 November 1935. He was a recipient of the Order of the Red Banner. He was head of the Soviet military intelligence from April 1935 to July 1937. During the Great Purge, he was arrested on 1 November 1937 and later executed at Kommunarka. He was rehabilitated in 1956. He was a nephew of Moisei Uritsky.

== Bibliography ==
- Колпакиди А. И., Север А. [in Russian] (2009). ГРУ. Уникальная энциклопедия. Энциклопедия спецназа (5000 экз ed.). М.: Яуза Эксмо. pp. 682–683. ISBN 978-5-699-30920-7.
- Лазарев С. Е. [in Russian] (2012), Социокультурный состав советской военной элиты 1931—1938 гг. и её оценки в прессе русского зарубежья, Воронеж: Воронежский ЦНТИ — филиал ФГБУ «РЭА» Минэнерго России, ISBN 978-5-4218-0102-3
- Черушев Н. С. [in Russian] (2003), "1937 год: элита Красной Армии на Голгофе", Военные тайны XX века, Moscow: Вече, ISBN 5-94538-305-8
- Черушев Н. С.; Черушев Ю. Н. (2012), Расстрелянная элита РККА (командармы 1-го и 2-го рангов, комкоры, комдивы и им равные): 1937—1941. Биографический словарь [Shot elite of the Red Army (commanders of the 1st and 2nd ranks, comkors, divisional commanders and their equal): 1937–1941. Biographical Dictionary], Moscow: Kuchkovo field; Metropolis [Кучково поле; Мегаполис], pp. 118–119, ISBN 978-5-9950-0217-8

Preceded by Vitaly Primakov	Commander of the 13th Rifle Corps; August 1932 – January 1934	Succeeded by Andrei Sazontov
Preceded by Yan Berzin	Head of the Main Intelligence Directorate of the Soviet Union; April 1935 – July 1937	Succeeded by Yan Berzin
