= Komkor =

Soviet military rank

Corps commander командир корпуса
- Coat-collar insignia
- Country: Soviet Union
- Service branch: Red Army
- Abbreviation: Komkor
- Formation: 1935
- Abolished: 1940
- Next higher rank: Komandarm 2nd rank
- Next lower rank: Komdiv
- Equivalent ranks: Flagman 1-go ranga

Komkor (Russian: комкор) is the syllabic abbreviation for corps commander (Russian: командир корпуса, romanized: komandir korpusa; lit. 'commander of the corps / corps commander'). It was a military rank in the Red Army and Red Army Air Force of the Union of Soviet Socialist Republics in the period from 1935 to 1940. It was also the designation for officers appointed to command a corps sized formation.

Until 1940 it was the fourth highest military rank of the Red Army. It was equivalent to corps commissar (ru: корпусной комиссар) of the political staff in all military branches, flag officer 1st rank (ru: флагман 1-го ранга) in the Soviet navy, or to commissar of state security 3rd rank (ru: комиссар государственной безопасности 3-го ранга). With the reintroduction of regular general ranks in 1940, the designation komkor was abolished, and replaced by Colonel general.

== History ==
This rank was introduced by a decision of the Central Executive Committee of the Soviet Union and the Council of People's Commissars, from September 22, 1935. The new rank structure was as follows:

- Command level Brigade X: Kombrig (Brigadier)
- Command level Division XX: Komdiv (Division commander)
- Command level Corps XXX: Komkor (Corps commander)
- Command level Field army XXXX: Komandarm 2nd rank (Army commander 2nd rank – Commander Army)
- Command level Army group, Front XXXXX: Komandarm 1st rank (Army commander 1st rank – Front commander)
- Marshal of the Soviet Union

A total number of 146 military personnel were promoted to Komkor. However, 59 were purged during the Great Purge. As a result of the reintroduction of the regular military rank system in 1940, one Komkor was promoted to General of the Army (Georgy Zhukov), 51 to Lieutenant general (OF-7), and six to Major general (OF-6). Finally, Komkor Leonid Grigorevich Petrovsky was promoted to lieutenant general in 1941.

== Rank insignia ==
Overcoat collar patch (big)

Jacket collar patch and gymnastyorka

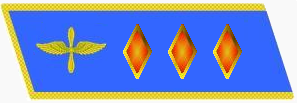
... Air Force

Chevron/ sleeve insignia

== Assignments and promotions ==
=== 1935 ===
The following officers were assigned the rank of Komkor by Order No. 2395 of the People's Commissar of Defence dated November 11, 1935, pertaining to the "personnel of the Army":

- Mikhail Ivanovich Alafusov, executed 1937;
- Maksim Andreevich Antonyuk, promoted to lieutenant general 1940;
- Iosif Rodionovich Apanasenko, promoted to Komandarm 2nd rank, converted to colonel general, promoted to General of the army;
- Ernest Fritzevich Appoga, executed 1937;
- Mikhail Alexandrovich Batorsky, executed 1938;
- Georgy Dmitrievich Bazilevich, executed 1939;
- Stepan Nikolaevich Bogomyagkov, arrested 1938, sent to prison 1941;
- Matvei Ivanovich Vasilenko, executed 1937;
- Mikhail Dmitrievich Velikanov, promoted to Komandarm 2nd rank, executed 1938;
- Yan Petrovich Gaylit, executed 1938;
- Ilya Ivanovich Garkavyi, executed 1938;
- Marcian Yakovlevich Germanovich, executed 1937;
- Vladimir Mikhailovich Gittis, executed 1938;
- Boris Sergeevich Gorbachyov, executed 1937
- Gorodovikov, Oka Ivanovich;
- Ivan Gryaznov, executed in 1938;
- Sergei Efimovich Gribov, executed in 1938;
- Yepifan Kovtyukh, executed in 1938;
- Nikolay Alekseevich Efimov, executed in 1938;
- Ivan Dmitriyevich Kosogov, executed in 1938;
- Nikolai Nikolayevich Krivoruchko, executed in 1938;
- Kulik, Grigory Ivanovich, promoted to Komandarm 2nd rank, than to Komandarm 1st rank, became Marshal of the Soviet Union, 1942 demoted to Major general, sent to prison 1947, executed 1950;
- Yan Yanovich Latsis, died in 1937 before the mass repressions of 1937–1938;
- Loktionov, Aleksandr Dmitrievich, promoted to Komanarm 2nd rank, converted to colonel general, arrested and executed 1941;
- Sergei A Mezheninov, executed 1937;
- Vitaly Primakov, executed 1937;
- Semyon Andreevich Pugachov, Arrested in 1938, sentenced in 1939 to 15 years of ITL and five years in his rights, died in detention on 23 March 1943;
- Putna, Vitovt Kazimirovich, executed 1937;
- Ivan Ivanovich Smolin, executed 1937;
- Mikhail Sangursky, executed 1938;
- Timoshenko, Semyon Konstantinivich;
- Alexander Todorsky, arrested 1938, 1939 sentenced to 15 years in Gulag, he was rehabilitated and restored in the army with the rank of lieutenant general, died in 1965;
- Semyon Petrovich Uritsky, executed 1938;
- Semyon Abramovich Turovsky, executed in 1937;
- Feldman, Boris Mironovich, executed 1937;
- Eideman, Robert Petrovich, executed 1937;
- Kasyan Alexandrovich Chaykovsky, arrested 1937, died in prison in 1938;
- Vasiliy Vladimirovich Khripin, executed 1938;
- Dmitry Fesenko, executed 1937;

By Order No. 2398" of the Minister of Defence (Soviet Union) from November 21, 1935, to the “personnel of the Army”:

- Veyner, Leonid Jakovlevich, executed 1937;
- Gekker, Anatoliy Ilyich, executed during the Great Purge 1937, and rehabilitated 1956.

By Order No. 2412" of the Minister of Defence (Soviet Union) from November 23, 1935, to the “personnel of the Army”:

- Zotov, Stepan Andeeevich;
- Stutzka, Kirill Andreevich, executed 1937.

By Order No. 2484" of the Minister of Defence (Soviet Union) from November 26, 1935, to the “personnel of the Army”:

- Lepin, Eduard Davydovich, executed 1938;
- Frinovsky, Mikhail Petrovich, promoted to Komandarm 2nd rank, executed 1940.

=== 1936 ===
- Kuybyshev, Nikolay Vladimirovich, executed 1938;
- Hahanyan, Grigory Davidovich, executed 1939;
- Leonty Ugryumov, executed 1937
- Ivan Tkachev, executed 1938
- Gaspar Voskanyan, executed 1937
- Konstantin Neumann, executed 1937

=== 1937 ===
- Yefremov, Mikhail Grigoryevich;
- Voronov, Nikolay Nikolayevich;
- Pavlov, Dmitry Grigoryevich, executed 1941;
- Smushkevich, Yakov Vladimirovich, executed 1941;
- Pyotr Pumpur, executed 1942;
- Georgy Sofronov;
- Leonid Petrovsky;
- Pyotr Bryanskikh, executed 1938;
- Ilya Smirnov.

=== 1938 ===
On 8 January 1938, the following officers were promoted:

- Filipp Golikov, promoted to Marshal of the Soviet Union 1961;
- Mikhail Kovalyov;

On 4 February, two officers received the rank:

- Mager, Maksim Petrovich, arrested 1938, released 1940, re-arrested and executed 1941;
- Goryachev, Yelisey Ivanovich, committed suicide by shooting himself 1938;

On 19 February, the following officer was promoted:

- Shtern, Grigory Mikhaylovich, promoted to Komandarm 2nd rank, than to colonel general, arrested 1941, executed;

On 20 February, the following officer was promoted:

- Astakhov, Fyodor Alekseevich, converted to lieutenant general of the aviation, Marshal of the aviation 1944;

On 22 February, the following officers were promoted:

- Stepan Kalinin;
- Vladimir Kachalov, promoted to Komandarm 2nd rank, converted to lieutenant general, held higher command positions during World War II, army commander, killed in World War II;
- Ivan Konev;
- Kirill Meretskov;
- Yevgeny Ptukhin, converted to lieutenant general, during Operation Barbarossa chief of the Southwestern Front Air Force, arrested 27 June 1941, executed 1942
- Andrei Sazontov, executed 1938
- Maxim Stepanov, arrested 1938, died in prison
- Ivan Tyulenev, promoted to Komandarm 2nd rank, converted to Army general
- Raphael Khmelnitsky, converted to lieutenant general
- Mikhail Khozin, promoted to Komandarm 2nd rank, converted to lieutenant general
- Pyotr Shelukhin, converted to major general

On 4 April, the following officer was promoted:

- Vsevolod Yakovlev, promoted to Komandarm 2nd rank, converted to lieutenant general

On 13 April, the following officer was promoted:

- Georgy Bondar, executed 1939

On 14 June, the following officer was promoted:

- Pyotr Filatov, converted to lieutenant general, killed in World War II

On 15 July, the following officer was promoted:

- Filipp Yershakov, converted to lieutenant general, captured and died in captivity in World War II

=== 1939 ===
The following officer was promoted to the rank on 5 February:

- Nikolai Veryovkin-Rakhalsy, converted to lieutenant general;

On 9 February, fourteen officers were promoted to Komkor:

- Ivan Boldin, promoted to Komandarm 2nd rank, converted to lieutenant general, during World War II held higher command positions, army commander, promoted to colonel general in 1944;
- Ivan Zakharkin, promoted to Komandarm 2nd rank, converted to lieutenant general, during World War II held higher command positions, army commander, promoted to colonel general in 1943;
- Vasily Chuikov, converted to lieutenant general during the great patriotic war at the highest command positions, commander of the armies, Marshal of the Soviet Union (1955);
- Matvei Zakharov, converted to major general, during the great patriotic war at the highest staff positions, the Chief of staff of a number of fronts, Marshal of the Soviet Union (1959);
- Timofey Kruglyakov, converted to major general;
- Vasily Kuznetsov, converted to lieutenant general;
- Vladimir Kurdyumov, promoted to Komandarm 2nd rank, converted to lieutenant general;
- Maksim Purkayev, converted to lieutenant general;
- Fyodor Remezov, converted to lieutenant general;
- Valentin Semashko, converted to major general, arrested in World War II, later released;
- Arkady Sivkov, converted to lieutenant general;
- Ivan Smorodvinov, promoted to Komandarm 2nd rank, converted to lieutenant general;
- Trifon Shevaldin, converted to lieutenant general;

Two coastal troops officers received the rank on 9 April:

- Sergei Vorobyov, converted to lieutenant general;
- Innokenty Mushnov, converted to lieutenant general;

On 31 July, the following officer was promoted to Komkor:

- Georgy Zhukov, converted to the general of the army, during World War II in higher command and staff positions, commander of a front, Marshal of the Soviet Union (1943);

On 13 August, two officers were promoted to the rank:

- Vladimir Grendal, promoted to Komandarm 2nd rank, converted to colonel general, died of lung cancer in 1940
- Markian Popov, converted to lieutenant general;

Fourteen officers received the rank on 4 November:

- Leonid Bobkin, converted to major general, killed in World War II;
- Nikolai Vatutin, converted to lieutenant general;
- Vasily Gerasimenko, converted to lieutenant general;
- Mikhail Dukhanov, converted to major general;
- Andrey Yeryomenko, converted to lieutenant general;
- Fyodor Ivanov, converted to major general, arrested in World War II, later released;
- Fyodor Kuznetsov, converted to lieutenant general;
- Mikhail Lukin, converted to lieutenant general, captured in World War II, returned to the Soviet Union and retired from the army;
- Nikifor Medvedev, converted to lieutenant general;
- Vasily Morozov, converted to lieutenant general;
- Vasily Repin, converted to lieutenant general;
- Dmitry Ryabyshev, converted to lieutenant general;
- Andrei Smirnov, converted to lieutenant general, killed in World War II;
- Yakov Cherevichenko, converted to lieutenant general

On 23 December, the following officer was promoted to Komkor:

- Valerian Frolov, converted to lieutenant general

On 31 December, two more officers received the rank:

- Vasily Sokolovsky, converted to lieutenant general, served as front chief of staff and commander during World War II, became Marshal of the Soviet Union in 1946
- Nikolai Klykov, converted to lieutenant general

=== 1940 ===
- Fillip Alekseevich Parusinov;
- Ivan Ivanovich Maslennikov;
- Pavel Fedorovich Zhigarev, converted to lieutenant general of the aviation, 1953 appointed to Marshal of the aviation, 1955 to Chief marshal of the aviation;
- Mikhail Artemievich Parsegov, converted to lieutenant-general of the artillery, during the Great Patriotic War at the highest command positions, commander of armies and artillery of a number of Fronts, colonel-general of the artillery in 1958;
- Filipp Danilovich Gorelenko;
- Sergey Prokofyevich Denisov;
- Konstantin Pavlovich Piadyshev, converted to lieutenant general, arrested in 1941, died in custody in 1943;
- Nikandr Chibisov, converted to lieutenant general;
- Stepan Akimov, converted to lieutenant general, died in a plane crash in October 1941;
- Nikolai Iustinovich Trubetskoy, converted to lieutenant general, arrested 11.07.1941, executed 23.02.1942;
- Pavel Rychagov, arrested 24.06.1941, executed 28.10.1941;
- Fyodor Konstantinovich Arzhenukhin, arrested 24.06.1941, executed 28.10.1941;
- Konstantin Mikhailovich Gusev, arrested July 1941, executed February 1942;
- Semyon Fedorovich Zhavoronkov, converted to lieutenant general of the aviation;
- Vladimir Zakharovich Romanovsky, converted to lieutenant general;
- Dmitry Timofeyevich Kozlov, converted to lieutenant general, reached senior command posts as commander of armies and fronts during the Great Patriotic War.

== See also ==
- Ranks and rank insignia of the Red Army 1935–1940, and ... 1940–1943
