= Dmitry Fesenko =

Soviet komkor (corps commander)

- Native name: Дмитрий Семёнович Фесенко
- Born: September 1895; Pyatigorsk, North Caucasus, Russian Empire
- Died: 15 October 1937 (aged 42) Moscow Oblast, Soviet Union
- Allegiance: Russian Empire; Soviet Union
- Branch: Imperial Russian Army; Soviet Red Army
- Service years: 1915–1917 (Russian Empire); 1918–1937 (Soviet Union)
- Rank: Komkor

Dmitry Semyonovich Fesenko (Russian: Дмитрий Семёнович Фесенко; September 1895 – 15 October 1937) was a Soviet Komkor (corps commander). He was born in present-day Stavropol Krai. He fought for the Imperial Russian Army during World War I before going over to the Bolsheviks during the subsequent Civil War. He was a recipient of the Order of the Red Banner. During the Great Purge, he was arrested on 18th of July, 1937 and later executed at Kommunarka.
