= Yelisey Goryachev =

Soviet Komkor who fought in the Imperial Russian Army in WWI

Yelisey Ivanovich Goryachev
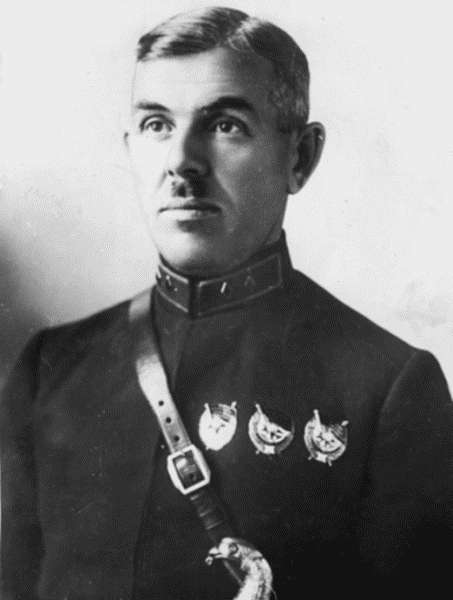
- Born: 1892; Kalachyovsky District, Volgograd Oblast, Russian Empire
- Died: December 12, 1938 (aged 45–46) Proskuriv, Ukrainian Soviet Socialist Republic, Soviet Union
- Allegiance: Russian Empire; Soviet Union
- Branch: Imperial Russian Army; Soviet Red Army
- Conflicts: World War I Russian Civil War

Yelisey Ivanovich Goryachev (1892 – December 12, 1938) was a Soviet Komkor (corps commander). He fought in the Imperial Russian Army in World War I before going over to the Bolsheviks.

He was a recipient of the Order of the Red Banner. During the Great Purge, he was one of the military judges in the Case of Trotskyist Anti-Soviet Military Organization of Marshal Mikhail Tukhachevsky on June 11, 1937. On February 4, 1938, Goryachev was formally promoted to Komkor and was named as commander of the cavalry army in Kiev on July 26, 1938. Fearing arrest, he committed suicide by shooting himself in Khmelnytskyi, Ukraine.

== Bibliography ==
- Жуков Г. К. Воспоминания и размышления. В трёх томах. Десятое издание, дополненное по рукописи автора. Издательство «Новости». Москва, 1990. С.274-277.
- Горбатов А. В. Годы и войны. — М.: Воениздат, 1989. С.102. Книга на сайте: http://militera.lib.ru/memo/russian/gorbatov/index.html
- (12) (Военно-исторический журнал ed.). 1969. ;
- Черушев Н. С. (2003). 1937 год: элита Красной Армии на Голгофе. Военные тайны XX века. М.: Вече. p. 560. ISBN 5-94538-305-8.
- Черушев Н. С.; Черушев Ю. Н. (2012), Расстрелянная элита РККА (командармы 1-го и 2-го рангов, комкоры, комдивы и им равные): 1937—1941. Биографический словарь [Shot elite of the Red Army (commanders of the 1st and 2nd ranks, comkors, divisional commanders and their equal): 1937-1941. Biographical Dictionary], Moscow: Kuchkovo field; Metropolis [Кучково поле; Мегаполис], pp. 72–74, ISBN 978-5-9950-0217-8
- http://www.budenney.ru/memoirs/2_09.html Будённый Семён Михайлович. Воспоминания. Глава 9. Даёшь Новоград-Волынский.
