= Sergei Mezheninov =

Sergei Aleksandrovich Mezheninov
- Born: 19 January 1890; Russian Empire
- Died: 28 September 1937 (aged 47)
- Allegiance: Russian Empire; Soviet Union
- Branch: Imperial Russian Army; Soviet Red Army
- Service years: 1918–1937 (Soviet Union)
- Conflicts: World War I Russian Civil War

Sergei Aleksandrovich Mezheninov (19 January 1890 – 28 September 1937) was a Soviet komkor (corps commander).

He fought for the Imperial Russian Army during World War I before going over to the Bolsheviks during the subsequent civil war. During this war, he commanded the 3rd, 12th and 15th Red Army.

At the time of the Great Purge, Mezheninov was arrested after a suicide attempt on 20 June 1937. He was accused of spying for Nazi Germany, convicted and later executed.

== Awards ==
Russian Empire:

- Order of Saint Vladimir, 4th class
- Order of Saint Anna, 4th class
- Order of Saint Anna, 3rd class

Soviet Union:

- Order of the Red Banner (1922)
- Order of the Red Star
