= Istra =

Istra may refer to:

== Places ==
- Istra (Moskva), a river in Russia
- Istra, Istrinsky District, Moscow Oblast, a town in Istrinsky District of Moscow Oblast, Russia
- Istra, Krasnogorsky District, Moscow Oblast, an inhabited locality named Istra in Krasnogorsky District, Moscow Oblast
- Istra Reservoir, a reservoir in Russia near Millerhof palace
- Istra (Rauma), a river in Rauma Municipality in Møre og Romsdal, Norway
- Istra or Istria, a peninsula in the Adriatic Sea
- Istria County, the Croatian portion of the Istria peninsula

== Sports ==
- FC Istra, an association football club in Russia
- NK Istra, an association football club in Croatia
- NK Istra 1961, an association football club in Croatia
