= Sergei Gribov =

Sergei Gribov may refer to:

- Sergei Gribov (footballer, born 1969), Russian footballer
- Sergei Gribov (footballer, born 2005), Russian footballer
- Sergei Gribov (military officer) (1895 – 1938), Soviet military officer
