= 5th Rifle Corps =

- Active: 1st formation: June 1922–July 1941; 2nd formation: June 1942–October 1945
- Country: Soviet Union
- Branch: Red Army
- Engagements: Soviet invasion of Poland; Eastern Front (World War II); Battle of Białystok–Minsk; Soviet invasion of Manchuria

Commanders
- Notable commanders: Vasily Chuikov; Leonid Petrovsky

The 5th Rifle Corps was a corps of the Soviet Union's Red Army, formed twice.

Formed in 1922, the corps was based at Bobruisk in Belarus for most of the interwar period. It fought in the Soviet invasion of Poland in September 1939, with elements participating in the Battle of Grodno before linking up with German troops. As a result, the corps was stationed on the border when the Operation Barbarossa, the German invasion of the Soviet Union, began on 22 June 1941. The corps was destroyed in the first week of the war in the Battle of Białystok–Minsk and officially disbanded in early July.

The corps was formed for a second time in mid-1942 in the Soviet Far East, and spent most of World War II guarding the border around Bikin, sending several formations to the Eastern Front while undergoing several reorganizations. In August 1945, the corps fought in the Soviet invasion of Manchuria as a separate unit directly controlled by the 2nd Far Eastern Front, capturing the Japanese fortified region adjacent to its sector of the border against light resistance, and advancing into Manchuria. The corps was disbanded after the war in late 1945.

== First formation ==
=== Interwar period ===
The 5th Rifle Corps was first formed at Minsk in June 1922 in accordance with an order of the Western Front of 27 May and an order of the Minsk Military Region of 13 June. In July of that year, the corps headquarters was relocated to Mogilev before moving to Bobruisk in October 1923. It was part of the Western Front until April 1924, when the front became the Western Military District (later the Belorussian Military District).

Markian Germanovich commanded the corps from June 1924, and was replaced by Ivan Smolin in March 1926; the latter commanded the corps until May 1927. Alexander Todorsky commanded the corps from July of that year until November 1928, when he was replaced by Sergey Gribov (promoted to Komkor in 1935); the latter commanded the corps until December 1935. In February 1936, Komdiv Yevgeny Kazansky became the corps commander and commissar. In April 1937, he was placed at the disposal of the People's Commissariat of Defense before being arrested in the Great Purge. Kazansky was succeeded in May by Komdiv Leonid Petrovsky, who commanded the corps until his transfer to lead the Central Asian Military District in November of that year. Under Petrovsky's command, the corps participated in the Belorussian maneuvers of 1937, cooperating with airborne troops in an advance east across the Dnieper. Petrovsky was replaced by Komdiv Filipp Yershakov, who transferred to the Kharkov Military District in January 1938.

In April, Komdiv Vasily Chuikov took command of the corps. On 26 June 1938, the district became the Western Special Military District, while the corps headquarters was used to form the headquarters of the Bobruisk Army Group under Chuikov's command, whose troops were stationed on the territory of Mogilev, Gomel, and Polesskoy Oblasts. A new corps headquarters was formed as a replacement. On 10 February 1939, Komdiv (promoted to Major General 5 June 1940) Alexander Garnov took command of the corps.

=== Soviet invasion of Poland ===
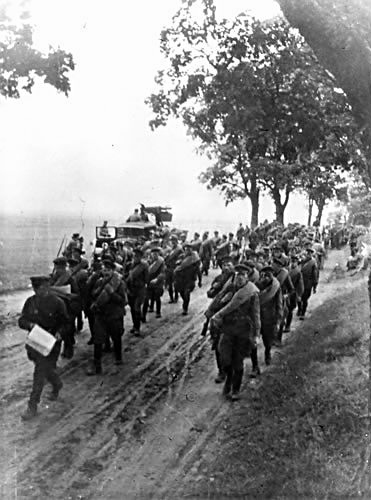
Soviet troops marching into Poland

The corps fought in the Soviet invasion of Poland in September, advancing into what was annexed by the Soviet Union as western Belarus. On 17 September, at the beginning of the invasion, it was part of the Dzerzhinsky Cavalry-Mechanized Group of the Belorussian Front and included the 4th and 13th Rifle Divisions. At 05:00 on that day it crossed the border into Poland, overrunning the overstretched Polish border guards. The corps captured 29 border guards while suffering losses of six killed and two wounded. It reached the Stolbtsy–Baranovichi railway line by 18:00 and the Usza River by 23:00, with mobile detachments advancing to the Servach River during the day. At 8:00 on 19 September, a motorcycle group from the 4th Division's 101st Rifle Regiment entered Slonim, receiving 6,000 prisoners of war from units of the 15th Tank Corps, advancing ahead of the 5th.

At 4:00 on 20 September, the motorcycle group of the 13th Division's 119th Rifle Regiment entered Volkovysk, where it was operationally subordinated to the 15th Tank Corps. The group encountered two squadrons of Polish cavalry 3 kilometers (1.9 mi) west of the city, capturing 150 with the loss of one killed. At 18:00 on 20 September, the 119th Regiment supported the tank corps' 27th Light Tank Brigade in the capture of the southern part of Grodno. That night, it managed to gain a foothold on the right bank of the Neman and reach the eastern approaches to the city. Meanwhile, the corps was transferred to the 10th Army. On 21 September, the main forces of the corps had reached Zelva, with the 101st and 119th Regiments moving on Grodno to fight in the battle for the city.

By the morning of 21 September, the 119th Regiment had arrived in Grodno, crossing to the right bank north of the 101st Regiment. Beginning at 6:00, the two regiments, reinforced with four guns and two tanks, attacked into the city, reaching the railway line by 12:00 despite Polish counterattacks and the city center at 14:00. The main forces of the 4th and 13th Divisions attacked from the east, but withdrew back to the city outskirts after reaching the railway line. After the Polish troops withdrew from the city on 22 September, the corps moved west and southwest from Volkovysk behind the 6th Cavalry Corps' 11th Cavalry Division.

On 24 September, the corps reached the Svislach–Porazava line, and its advance detachments took control of Bielsk Podlaski and Brańsk at 13:00 on 25 September. On the next day, in the Gaynovichi area, the corps captured 120 Polish soldiers and discovered an ammunition depot. On the same day, in the Czyżew area, a German rearguard detachment was fired upon by Polish troops, losing one killed and four wounded before moving to Ciechanowiec, where Soviet troops provided medical assistance to them. On 27 September, the corps' forward detachments reached Nur and Czyżew, discovering another Polish ammunition depot near Gaynuki and digging up buried weapons in the forests. That night, a Polish detachment of 50 cavalrymen attacked departing German units at Nur, who moved west covered by the 13th Division's reconnaissance battalion. The battalion scattered the Polish detachment in the area of the village of Moderka. By 19:00 on 29 September, the corps' units occupied Małkinia Górna and Kosów Lacki. The 121st Rifle Division joined the corps by 2 October.

=== Operation Barbarossa ===
In November 1940, the corps headquarters was relocated to the new border at Bielsk Podlaski. It included the 13th, 86th (transferred to the corps in August 1940), and 113th Rifle Divisions and was headquartered at Zambrów by 22 June 1941, when Operation Barbarossa, the German invasion of the Soviet Union, began. The 113th Division was temporarily subordinated to the corps commander, while the 5th Separate Corps Aviation Squadron provided liaison, fire correction, and reconnaissance capabilities to the corps. The 156th and 315th Corps Artillery Regiments provided artillery support to the corps, but were stationed at the artillery summer camp in preparation for the summer training season southeast of Łomża in the Chervony Bor area on 22 June.

On the morning of 22 June, the corps headquarters was bombed by German aircraft. Having suffered heavy losses to German bombing and artillery fire, the 113th Division assembled in a relatively orderly fashion and moved northwest to cover the border in accordance with pre-war planning. A few hours later, on the march, it was struck in the flank by troops of the IX Army Corps and routed. The division ceased to exist as a unit, although individual groups continued to fight on the southern edge of the Białowieża Forest for several days.

The 86th Rifle Division defended positions to the northwest of the German breakthrough. To the west of Zambrów, two battalions from its 169th Rifle Regiment defended positions of the 64th Fortified Region. Their positions were somewhat strengthened by the fire of four battalions of the 124th Howitzer Artillery Regiment in the second half of the day, which inflicted losses on the German troops. The 330th Rifle Regiment defended the border railway station of Czyżew; it had been marching from the Zambrów area, where it had drilled the day before the war began, to summer camp at Ciechanów. Its 3rd Battalion was sent to the unfinished 64th Fortified Region positions at Zaręby Kościelne, which had been captured by German troops. The battalion suffered heavy losses in trying to retake the pillboxes at 8:00, but temporarily halted the German advance in the sector.

The Western Front issued an order at 22:00 on 23 June that subordinated the 124th and 375th Howitzer Artillery Regiments and the 311th Gun Artillery Regiment to the corps commander.

Due to its position, the corps was destroyed in the first days of Operation Barbarossa. It was disbanded in early July.

== Second formation ==
=== Garrison duty in the Far East ===
In June 1942, the 5th Rifle Corps was reformed as part of the Far Eastern Front's 1st Red Banner Army, under the command of Colonel Alexey Khvostov from 27 June. It included the 246th and the 248th Rifle Brigades, and was stationed in the Soviet Far East, guarding the border with the Japanese-controlled Manchuria. The 248th Brigade was transferred to the front in the west and was replaced by the 12th Rifle Brigade in July. The 95th Rifle Brigade joined the corps in August. In November, the 12th Rifle Brigade was transferred to the army's 59th Rifle Corps, and the newly formed 187th Rifle Division joined the corps in February 1943. On 26 June, Major General Ivan Pashkov took command of the corps; he would lead it for the rest of its existence. In July, it was transferred to the 35th Army, taking control of all of the army's infantry units – the 35th, 66th, and (newly formed) 264th Rifle Divisions, the 30th Rifle Brigade, and the 1408th Separate Rifle Regiment. The 95th and 246th Brigades transferred with the corps, while the 187th Division remained with the 1st Army.

The corps' structure remained constant until December 1944, when all of its units except for the 66th Rifle Division were directly subordinated to the army headquarters. In April 1945, the corps was directly subordinated to the front headquarters, including the 35th and 390th Rifle Divisions in its structure; the 66th Division remained with the 35th Army. Due to its transfer, the corps became known as the 5th Separate Rifle Corps.

=== Soviet invasion of Manchuria ===
Map of the Soviet invasion of Manchuria, August 1945

In preparation for the Soviet invasion of Manchuria, the corps became part of the 2nd Far Eastern Front after the Far Eastern Front was split on 5 August. For the invasion, the 172nd Tank Brigade, two self-propelled gun battalions, an anti-tank brigade, an anti-aircraft regiment, and two anti-aircraft battalions were attached to the corps. These fielded 164 tanks and self-propelled guns, 1,433 guns and mortars, and eighteen multiple rocket launchers. Front commander Army General Maxim Purkayev tasked the corps, on the front's left flank, with conducting a supporting attack to the left of the 15th Army in cooperation with the 3rd Brigade of the Amur Flotilla and troops of the Khabarovsk Border Guard District. The 5th Corps was to cross the Ussuri River from the Bikin area north of Iman, destroy or cut off the Japanese forces stationed in the Jaoho Fortified Region, and capture Jaoho. It was then to advance west to Chiamussu and capture the towns of Paoching and Poli after crossing the Lesser Khingan Mountains, linking up with the 1st Far Eastern Front's 35th Army at Poli. The corps was also to cooperate with the 15th Army to destroy the Japanese forces on the Sungari, although 80 kilometers of swampy marshlands separated it from the latter. The front's offensive operations were later known in Soviet historiography as the Sungari Offensive.

To support their operations, the corps and the 15th Army achieved a maximum artillery density of between 100 and 150 guns and mortars per kilometer (161 to 241 guns per mile) in their primary attack sectors. The corps' attack was preceded by a 30-minute artillery preparation, and its assault crossing was supported by a 50-minute artillery bombardment. In the crossing phase, the corps' artillery fired five minutes of heavy fire on predetermined targets to support the assault crossings of the forward detachments, before moving forward into the Japanese rear. Pashkov placed the 390th Division and the 172nd Tank Brigade in the first echelon, spearheading the Ussuri crossing, followed by the 35th Division in the second echelon.

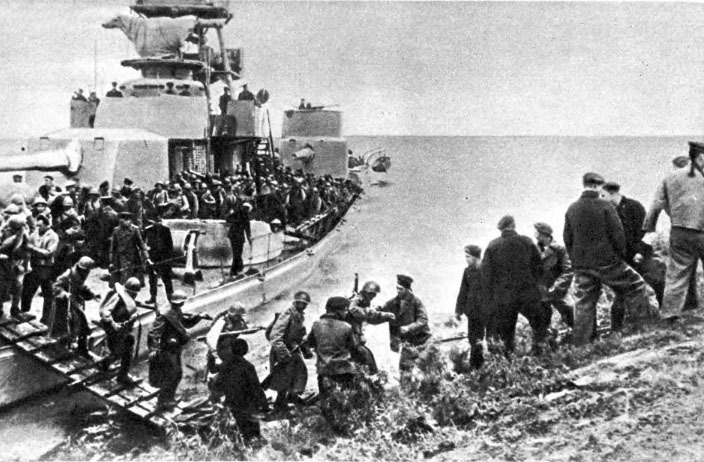
Soviet troops crossing the Amur aboard a monitor of the Amur Flotilla during the Sungari Offensive

On the first day of the invasion, 9 August, the corps' assault units and reconnaissance detachments crossed the Ussuri at 01:00, aboard rafts, barges, steamship ferries, and boats of the 3rd Brigade of the Amur Flotilla. The opposite bank and Jaoho fortifications were defended by only one infantry company from the Japanese 135th Infantry Division, supported by two battalions of Manchurian auxiliaries. After the artillery preparation, the 390th Division's advanced battalions crossed the river and captured a bridgehead north of Jaoho in the morning, subsequently followed by main force units. It took fifteen hours to ferry the tanks of the 172nd Tank Brigade across the Ussuri, although a shortage of roads forced the brigade to leave its rear units behind.

The 390th Division captured the Jaoho Fortified Region and the town of Jaoho by the end of 10 August, beginning the advance southwest towards Paoching on the next day. The troops traveled in march columns led by tanks from the 172nd Brigade. The march was lengthened by poor road conditions, while the Japanese offered little resistance due to the Japanese Fifth Army having withdrawn the 135th Division west to join the main Japanese force. Paoching was captured by the 172nd Brigade and the lead units of the 390th Division on 14 August after they pushed out its garrison. The 172nd and the 390th then continued towards Poli, followed by the main forces of the corps. On 19 August, the lead elements of the corps linked up with the 35th Army's 66th Rifle Division at Poli after crossing southward through the mountains from Paoching, having faced "virtually no Japanese resistance". During the invasion, the 5th Corps reported the capture of 2,786 Japanese and Manchukuoan soldiers and officers. Its role in the campaign ended after reaching Poli.

=== Postwar ===
By 3 September, the corps had been transferred to the 15th Army, and included the 34th, 35th, 361st, and 388th Rifle Divisions. It was disbanded by the end of October 1945, headquartered at Bikin as part of the Far Eastern Military District. The 34th Division was transferred to the Transbaikal-Amur Military District, while the 35th was also disbanded.

== Commanders ==
The following officers are known to have commanded the corps' first formation:

- Markian Germanovich (June 1924–March 1926)
- Ivan Smolin (March 1926–May 1927)
- Alexander Todorsky (July 1927–November 1928)
- Sergey Gribov (promoted to Komkor 1935, November 1928–December 1935)
- Komdiv Yevgeny Kazansky (February 1936–April 1937)
- Komdiv Leonid Petrovsky (May–November 1937)
- Komdiv Filipp Yershakov (November 1937–January 1938)
- Komdiv Vasily Chuikov (April–June 1938)
- Komdiv (promoted to Major General 5 June 1940) Alexander Garnov (10 February 1939–after 22 June 1941)

The following officers commanded the corps' second formation:

- Colonel Alexey Khvostov (27 June 1942–25 June 1943)
- Major General Ivan Pashkov (26 June 1943–after 3 September 1945)
