= 354th Rifle Division =

354th Rifle Division (August 11, 1941 – June, 1946)
- Maj. Gen. Vladimir Dzhandzhgava, Hero of the Soviet Union
- Active: 1941 – 1946
- Country: Soviet Union
- Branch: Red Army
- Type: Division
- Role: Infantry
- Engagements: Battle of Moscow; Battles of Rzhev; Battle of Kursk; Battle of the Dniepr; Gomel-Rechitsa Offensive; Kalinkovichi-Mozyr Offensive; Ozarichi-Ptich Offensive; Operation Bagration; Bobruisk Offensive; Lublin-Brest Offensive; Vistula-Oder Offensive; East Pomeranian Offensive; Berlin Strategic Offensive
- Decorations: Order of Lenin; Order of the Red Banner; Order of Suvorov
- Battle honours: Kalinkovichi

Commanders
- Notable commanders: Maj. Gen. Dimitrii Fyodorovich Alekseev; Maj. Gen. Vladimir Nikolaievich Dzhandzhgava

The 354th Rifle Division was raised in 1941 as a standard Red Army rifle division, and served for the duration of the Great Patriotic War in that role. It took part in the defense of Moscow and the winter counteroffensive of 1941–42, and then in the costly battles around the German salient near Rzhev. It also served in the defensive battle of Kursk and the summer offensive that followed in 1943. The division distinguished itself in at least three battles. It was credited with the liberation of the town of Kalinkovichi on January 14, 1944, and shared credit with other formations for the liberation of Bobruisk during Operation Bagration. It also played the leading role in the defense of 65th Army's bridgehead over the Narev River in October, 1944. During the final offensives into Germany in 1945 it advanced through Poland and Pomerania and ended the war near Stettin. The 354th compiled a highly distinguished record of service, but nevertheless was disbanded in June, 1946.

== Formation ==
The division was organized at Penzensk in the Volga Military District, starting on August 11, 1941, through to the end of October, when it began moving to the front. Its full order of battle was as follows:

- 1199th Rifle Regiment
- 1201st Rifle Regiment
- 1203rd Rifle Regiment
- 921st Artillery Regiment
- 476th Sapper Battalion
- 645th Antiaircraft Battalion
- 809th Signal Battalion
- 443rd Medical Battalion
- 420th Reconnaissance Company
- 473rd Truck Company
- 436th Chemical Defense Company

Col. Dmitrii Fyodorovich Alekseev was named divisional commander on September 1. Alekseev had the advantage of starting with an unusually strong cadre for this period of the war; 35 percent of his officers were active-duty, and he received a large number of high-morale, experienced Communist Party members from the Penzensk party organization. Alekseev would be promoted to Major General on May 19, 1943, and apart from a few weeks in October/November, 1943, he would remain in command until nearly the end of that year.

=== Battle of Moscow ===
On November 26 the 354th was assigned to 16th Army, under command of Lt. Gen. K.K. Rokossovski, part of Western Front defending before Moscow. In early December the 16th Army joined in the Soviet counteroffensive against German Army Group Center. The division first went on the offensive on the morning of December 3, reaching the southern outskirts of Matushkino by late afternoon. According to the Soviet General Staff study of the battle, the release of the 354th from the reserve enabled 16th Army to not only actively defend the line but to also go over to a partial counter-offensive on that date.

By December 14 the division was fighting along the western bank of the reservoir of the Istra River, reaching Armyagovo with two companies before coming under organized German fire and being forced to pull back with heavy losses to their jumping-off position. Despite such occasional setbacks, the Germans were forced back from the Istra line by December 16 and over the next four days were continually pursued by 16th Army to the Ruza River. During this period the 354th was officially credited with capturing 130 motor vehicles, 13 guns and 30 tanks.

During that month the 354th was reinforced with the 274th Antitank Battalion (12 45mm guns, 27 PTRD antitank rifles); in addition, each rifle regiment had its own company of 27 PTRDs, giving the division a very strong antitank defense for a rifle division of this period. At the same time, however, the 645th AA Battalion was replaced with the 307th AA Battery, with just 4 37mm guns. In early 1942 the 354th was further reinforced with the 516th Mortar Battalion. The division pushed on in the counteroffensive, taking the villages of Terekhovo, Kniazhevo, and Ignatkovo on January 20, 1942, but by now was down to the strength of an oversize battalion.

== Battles of Rzhev ==
The division spent all of 1942 and early 1943 in Western Front. It was reassigned to the 5th Army in late January, where it remained until it was moved to the 20th Army in July, and then briefly to 31st Army before returning to the 20th. In late October the 516th Mortar Battalion, as well as the mortar battalions in each rifle regiment, were disbanded, and the weapons were redistributed to the individual rifle companies.

In the late stages of Operation Mars, the 354th, now part of the 8th Guards Rifle Corps in 20th Army, and one of the few fresh units available to the Western Front command, was directed to attack German strongholds in the villages of Khlepen and Zherebtsovo, beginning on November 30. The division's assault briefly threatened the 2nd Battalion of the 13th Panzergrenadier Regiment with complete encirclement, but in the process the division had suffered "immense casualties" and could not complete its mission. The division then went back into Western Front reserves for rebuilding. By the end of January, the division was back up to 75% of its authorized manpower, but only 70% of the required horses and 25% of the authorized trucks and tractors.

=== Battle of Kursk ===
In February, 1943, the 354th was reassigned to Lt. Gen. P.I. Batov's 65th Army in Rokossovski's Central Front (former Don Front). The division would continue under the command of Batov and Rokossovski for the duration of the war. The Front was deployed to the Kursk area, most of it from Stalingrad, a movement that took longer than expected due to persistent poor weather and deteriorating roads. A situation report by Rokossovski's chief of operations on February 24 stated as follows:

"The 65th ARMY - Transportation by railroad has, on the whole, been completed. The march by the main forces of four rifle divisions (the 69th, 149th and 354th Rifle and 37th Guards) from the Ponyri and Leninskii line to jumping-off positions at Dubrova, Mokhovoe, and Androsovo by day's end on 23 February is continuing. The distance of the march is 60 kilometres. The divisions can be concentrated in their jumping-off positions by the end of 25 February... The condition of the forces:... the 354th Rifle Division - 7,500men... The howitzers of all artillery units have lagged behind - and there are no tractors."

During the following weeks the division helped make gains in a gap between the German 2nd Army and 2nd Panzer Army until German reserves freed up by their evacuation of the Rzhev salient brought the advance to a halt. The 354th remained in the Kursk salient through the following months, including Operation Citadel. 65th Army's positions were in the western sector of the bulge, and were not directly involved in the German offensive.

== Battles for Belarus ==
Following the German defeat at Kursk, Central Front began advancing westward out of the salient. During the following months the division was assigned first to the 18th and then to the 19th Rifle Corps. Two months of offensive campaigning gradually wore down the 354th until by September each rifle regiment had only two battalions of three companies, each company with 55 - 60 men. The machine gun companies had five or six guns each, and the mortar companies two or three tubes total. The 921st Artillery Regiment had 20 guns and howitzers, and the 274th Antitank Battalion was down to just 8 45mm guns; in summary, the division was at about 63% of its authorized strength in guns and mortars.

=== Gomel-Rechitsa Offensive ===
In spite of this, on September 28 the 1203rd Rifle Regiment, reinforced by the 257th Separate Army Shtrafnaya (Penal) Company, made a successful assault crossing of the Sozh River at Novaya Tereshkovichi. On the following day, the rest of the division crossed the river, and General Batov reinforced this bridgehead with a handful of tanks from the Army's 255th Tank Regiment. Shortly thereafter he ordered the 37th Guards and 140th Rifle Divisions to reinforce the bridgehead as well. On October 1 the three divisions attacked the German 6th Infantry Division's positions, and having breached them, fanned out to liberate the villages of Noyve and Starye Diatlovichi in heavy fighting. From October 18 to November 21 the division was temporarily under the command of Maj. Gen. Porfyrii Sergeevich Furt, until Alekseev returned to command.

By October 20, 65th Army's attacks had bogged down on this sector, and the offensive towards Gomel was temporarily halted. However, on October 15, a further attack by forces on the left wing of Rokossovksky's front (soon to be renamed Belorussian Front) forced a passage across the Dniepr in the area of Love and gained ground fast; by the 20th the Soviet forces had carved out a bridgehead 90 km wide and 16 km deep across the Dniepr, and went on to try to cut the rail line from Rechitsa to Gomel. In order to sustain this advance, Batov had already been ordered to reinforce this bridgehead with the 354th and 246th Rifle Divisions, and they were accordingly re-subordinated to the 27th Rifle Corps. This bridgehead was also reinforced with the 9th Tank and 7th Guards Cavalry Corps. They faced three extremely worn-down divisions of the German XX Army Corps. Even before the regrouping was complete, on October 20, 65th Army's renewed assault overran the German defenses, forcing the defenders back about 2 km between the Dniepr and Radul. On October 24, the divisions of 27th Corps punched a 5-km-wide breach in the positions of 102nd Infantry Division south of Lipniaki, into which Batov committed the 2nd Guards Cavalry Corps. Only an intervention by a battle group of 2nd Panzer Division contained it. Heavy fighting raged for more than a week until German 2nd Army was forced to begin a phased withdrawal to new positions in the rear. By October 28, 27th Corps had advanced another 15 – 20 km, as much as 23 km northwest of Love, linking up with the advancing forces of 61st Army, but the forces of both armies had by now "shot their bolt", and a halt was called on October 30.

Over the next ten days Belorussian Front carried out another regrouping to continue the offensive and encircle and destroy the German Rechitsa-Gomel grouping. 65th Army remained in the center of the Front's main attack sector, with 27th Corps on the right wing. The 354th was in the first echelon, along with the 115th Rifle Brigade. The Corps' mission was:

"... to penetrate the enemy defense in the Bushatin region (a sector of 4 kilometres), destroy the opposing enemy in their strongholds, and capture Hill 131.6 and the village of Prokisel (at a depth of 6 kilometers)."

The order went on to set further objectives. The offensive reopened on November 10, and in the first two days the 27th and 19th Rifle Corps had carved out a penetration which was then exploited into the Germans' operational rear by 1st Tank and 7th Guards Cavalry Corps. On November 13, 27th Corps, with the assistance of elements of the tank Corps, captured Demekhi, 12 km west of Rechitsa, cutting the German rail line to that city from the west. The 354th then led a wheeling movement to the northwest, attempting to reach the Berezina River south of Parichi. By nightfall on November 20 the division was approaching Vasilkov, 25 km northwest of Rechitsa, and on the same day the Germans faced reality and withdrew from the city, which was liberated by elements of 42nd Rifle Corps. By this point, the offensive had unhinged all of Army Group Center's defenses in southern Belorussia, and Soviet forces were exploiting into a 20 km-wide gap.

By November 29, the 354th was deep in the penetration, about 25 km south of Parichi, with virtually no German forces to oppose it. With the rest of 29th Corps it established close contacts with local partisan brigades, forming the so-called Rudobelskie Gates, through which a steady supply of arms, ammunition and personnel flowed to and from the partisans. Shortly thereafter, General Batov ordered the bulk of the Corps to wheel southward to increase the pressure on German defenses north of Kalinkovichi, the rail hub that supplied most of German 2nd Army. At about the same time, Hitler finally gave his 9th Army orders to abandon Gomel, which freed up enough troops to contain the Soviet penetration, thus bringing the offensive to a halt.

=== Kalinkovichi Offensives ===
Rokossovski remained determined to reach the objectives set for him by the STAVKA, specifically the city of Bobruisk and more generally the capital city of Minsk. In order to carry this out he recognized the need to eliminate the German grouping around Kalinkovichi and Mozyr. The 354th was still in the area of the Rudobelskie Gates, but very much overstretched. Despite this, when 65th Army launched its first offensive on Kalinkovichi on December 8, the division overcame German defenses at Koreni, captured the heights to the south, advanced 4 km, and split 4th Panzer Division from a battlegroup of 5th Panzer Division that was guarding its right flank. Overall, the offensive had mixed results, and was halted by December 12. It was followed on December 20–23 by a German counterstroke, Operation Nikolaus, which forced the right wing of 65th Army back by 25–30 km, losing most of the gains in the direction of Parichi and restoring the link between German 9th and 2nd Armies, but this did not directly affect the 354th. On December 27, General Alekseev handed command of the division over to Col. Nikolai Alexeevich Krimskii, who would remain in command until February 13, 1944. Alekseev moved to command of the new 105th Rifle Corps, which he would command for the duration, and which the 354th would later join.

On January 2, 1944, Rokossovski received an order from the STAVKA, which began:

"Begin an offensive with the forces on the Front's left wing, defeat the enemy's Kalinkovichi-Mozyr grouping, and subsequently attack towards Bobruisk and Minsk. The 65th and 61st Armies [are] responsible for its fulfillment."

Throughout this offensive, which began on January 8, 27th Corps was holding the line facing 4th Panzer, and later the 707th Security Division, northeast of Ozarichi. The attack made little ground in the first days, and a new plan was implemented on January 11, which soon overwhelmed the German lines. Kalinkovichi and Mozyr were liberated on January 14. Oddly, in spite of its passive role during this stage of the offensive, the 354th was awarded a divisional honorific:

"KALINKOVICHI"... 354th Rifle Division (Colonel Krimskii, Nikolai Alexeevich)... The troops who participated in the liberation of Mozyr and Kalinkovichi, by the order of the Supreme High Command of January 14, 1944, and a commendation in Moscow, are given a salute of 20 artillery salvoes from 224 guns.

=== Ozarichi-Ptich Offensive ===
Rokossovski was determined to continue his assaults on German 2nd Army, and after a brief pause launched a new offensive on January 16. General Batov's plan was to penetrate the German line along the Ipa River at the junction between 4th Panzer and the weak 707th Security Division. The penetration would be made overnight on January 15/16, led by advance detachments of ski troops from 19th Rifle Corps. 27th Corps was in the second echelon. The fast-moving and silent skiers got into the German rear and spread alarm, scattering the right wing of the security troops. 60th and 354th Rifle Divisions moved into the penetration and pushed westward 3–5 km towards Ozarichi, where the headquarters of XXXXI Panzer Corps was located; it was forced to displace to Parichi. By the end of the 19th these divisions were just 2 km from the eastern defenses of the town, and were being reinforced by elements of 105th Rifle Corps. Two days later, in heavy fighting, the 354th and 253rd Divisions fought their way into Ozarichi, but were unable to drive the 35th Infantry Division from its western outskirts. At this point the gap in the German defenses was 15 km-wide and 12 km-deep and there was virtually nothing they could do to plug it. While the two Soviet armies continued to advance, the 354th remained held up at Ozarichi until January 25. A few days later the division was transferred to the 95th Rifle Corps and moved north from the still-contested town.

The division remained in much the same positions through February, during which it was transferred again, this time to the 105th Rifle Corps, where it would remain for the duration. On February 14, Colonel Krimskii was replaced by Col. Nikolai Vasilievich Smirnov, who would hold command for the next two months. On the night of March 16, the LVI Panzer Corps began withdrawing from its forward positions, including those just west of Ozarichi. The divisional history describes the pursuit:

"On the night of 16 March, a platoon of scouts from 1203rd Rifle Regiment wedged into the defenses of the enemy, who had begun to withdraw their forces from the first positions into the depth of the defense. The platoon commander, Sergeant V. Dziuban, quickly informed his regimental commander. On Major N. A. Kharitonov's orders, [Dziuban's] forces penetrated into the enemy's trenches with a swift attack and began advancing forward. The division's other regiments joined the offensive in the morning. They drove the covering forces back and advanced 5-6 kilometres by the evening of the next day. While pursuing the withdrawing enemy, the forward detachments discovered a concentration camp 4 kilometres north of the village of Kholma, and a second 2 kilometres to the northwest in the village of Medved. Once again staring death in the eyes, the soldiers were staggered by what they saw. Dying old men, women, and children were sitting in the forests and the swamps or lying on the frozen ground, in a state of delirium. The territory within the camps was strewn with coils of barbed wire, and the approaches to them within and outside were mined. The surrounding pits and ditches were choked with corpses. The living lay among the dead and dying."

The 354th, with its Corps, reached German 9th Army's new defenses along the Tremlia River late on March 17.

All this came at a cost and during this month the rifle units in the division were at about 1/3rd their authorized strength. For example, on March 24 the 1201st Rifle Regiment consisted of:

- 1 rifle battalion
- 1 mortar battery with 3 120mm mortars and 30 men
- 1 regimental gun battery with 3 guns and 40 men
- 1 antitank battery with 2 45mm guns and 15 men
- 1 reconnaissance platoon with 20 men
- 1 submachine gun platoon with 15 men
- 1 antitank rifle platoon with 25 men
- 1 sapper platoon with 12 men
- 1 signal platoon (30 men); 1 transport platoon (12 men) and 1 medical platoon.

Accordingly, from early April until early June the division was withdrawn to the reserves of 65th Army for rebuilding, after which it returned to the 105th Rifle Corps in the renamed 1st Belorussian Front. On April 15, Col. Sergei Andreevich Vdovin took command of the division, which he would hold until just after the start of the coming summer offensive.

== Operation Bagration ==
At the start of that offensive, Operation Bagration, the 105th Rifle Corps was in the first echelon of 65th Army, with the 354th in second echelon of the Corps, behind the 75th Guards and 193rd Rifle Divisions. The 1st Guards Tank Corps was assigned to support the rifle divisions. They faced the German 36th Infantry Division of XXXXI Panzer Corps, a division that been badly battered during Operation Kutuzov a year earlier. The offensive opened at 0200 hrs. on June 23 with an artillery barrage, followed by probing attacks all along the front of German 9th Army. The attack began in earnest the next day. A two-hour bombardment, including airstrikes, on the 105th Corps sector was followed by an assault that broke through all five German trench lines in the first defense zone. At noon, Batov sent in the tank corps and the five rifle divisions of the second echelon, including the 354th. At 1600 hrs. the tanks had broken through and were advancing on Bobruisk. In the morning of June 25, 105th Corps was driving 36th Division back towards Parichi; the next day the Corps bypassed the town and, with the help of the armor got within 6 km of Bobruisk by nightfall. By 1600 hrs. on June 27, 105th Corps, with 1st Guards Tank and 9th Tank Corps, began attacking the city from the northwest and south; they were joined by elements of 3rd and 48th Armies the next day.

On the same day, Colonel Vdovin was replaced in command of the division by Col. Vladimir Nikolayevich Dzhandzhgava, who had briefly commanded the 15th Sivash Rifle Division the previous year. Dzhandzhgava would be promoted to major general in February, 1945, and remained in command for the duration. At 1000 hrs. on June 29 the final attack on the city was launched, with the 354th and 356th Divisions leading the way in crossing the Berezina from the east. The division was recognized for its role in the liberation of Bobruisk on July 5 with the award of the Order of the Red Banner. Just weeks later it was further decorated with the Order of Suvorov, 2nd class, in recognition of the part it played in the liberation of Baranovichi.

== Into Poland and Germany ==
With the defenses of Army Group Center shattered, the division raced westward towards Poland. While attempting to reach and cross the Western Bug River, the forward detachments of 65th Army were counterattacked by elements of three German divisions from July 19 to 25. The 354th faced off against the 5th SS Panzer Division "Viking"; although some elements of the division were surrounded for a time, the Germans were eventually forced to pull back. After an advance of more than 600 km, the 65th Army reached the Narev River on September 5 and forced a crossing. The 354th was sent into the bridgehead and, while unable to further expand it, was successful in helping to defend it against immediate German counterattacks. The division dug in, but on October 4 came under a massive artillery bombardment and found itself under attack by the 3rd Panzer Division and driven back towards the river. Partly owing to Colonel Dzhandzhgava's personal intervention in the battle, the bridgehead was barely held. This bridgehead would become one of the breakout points for Rokossovski's 2nd Belorussian Front in January, 1945. Dzhandzhgava was promoted to the rank of Major General on November 2.

The new offensive began on January 14, and the 354th pushed on through northern Poland and eastern Germany to the Elbe River during the next few months. On February 19 the 1201st Rifle Regiment was awarded the Order of Suvorov, 3rd Degree, for its part in the liberation of Mława and other nearby towns. As the final offensive began in April, the division had 6,000 personnel; the rifle regiments had two battalions of two companies of 60 – 70 men each, machine-gun companies had only 4-5 guns each, and the mortar companies had only 3-4 mortars. The 921st Artillery Regiment had 22 guns and howitzers, while the 274th Antitank Battalion counted only eight guns left in two batteries.

When the Berlin operation began on April 16 the 105th Rifle Corps consisted of the 354th, 193rd and 44th Guards Rifle Divisions. The Corps was on the right flank of 65th Army, and the 354th was in the first echelon. Part of the division was designated to reconnoiter the German positions across the Oder, and then to help lead the forcing of the east branch of the river on the 18th. Despite 65th Army's expertise in river crossings, this operation was complicated by normal spring flooding, which was worsened when the Germans opened floodgates higher up the river on April 20. At this time, most of the division was on the lowland between the Oder's east and west branches, which was soon inundated. General Dzhandzhgava gave orders that all divisional equipment was to be loaded on rafts, tied to trees to resist the floodwaters, while the personnel were also to take to the trees. As the flood abated, elements of the division crossed to the river's west bank, established a bridgehead and captured a fortified village, to which Dzhandzhgava soon transferred his command post. On May 1, Stalin gave thanks to the 354th for the capture of the German city of Stralsund.

== Postwar ==
Monument in park dedicated to the 354th Rifle Division in Penzensk, 2006.

On June 4 the division was awarded its final decoration, the Order of Lenin, for its participation in the taking of Anklam, Neubrandenburg, and other nearby German towns during the Berlin Operation. At this time the division carried the full title of 354th Rifle, Kalinkovichi, Order of Lenin, Order of the Red Banner, Order of Suvorov Division [Russian: 354-я стрелковая Калинковичская ордена Ленина Краснознамённая ордена Суворова дивизия]. Seven men of the 354th Rifle Division, including General Dzhandzhgava, were named as Heroes of the Soviet Union, all in 1945. On March 1, 1946, Dzhandzhgava handed command over to Col. Fyodor Alekseevich Grebyonkin. The division was stationed in Poland with its corps and disbanded in June, 1946.
