= 11th Guards Rifle Division =

18th Moscow Militia Division (2 Jul – Sep, 1941) 18th Rifle Division (III) (Sep 1941 – 5 Jan 1942) 11th Guards Rifle Division (5 Jan 1942 – 1946)
- Active: 1941–1946
- Country: Soviet Union
- Allegiance: Red Army
- Branch: Infantry
- Size: Division
- Engagements: Battle of Moscow; Battle of Kursk; Operation Bagration; East Prussian Strategic Offensive Operation
- Decorations: Order of Lenin; Order of the Red Banner; Order of Suvorov 2nd class
- Battle honours: Gorodok

The 11th Guards Rifle Division was a rifle division of the Red Army during the Great Patriotic War. It was disbanded in 1946.

== History ==
=== 18th Moscow Militia Division ===
Originally formed on 2 July 1941 in the Leningrad region of Moscow. The subordinate regiments were numbered on 20 July. As of 16 July the division had 6934 men assigned but no weapons or equipment had been assigned. On 20 July the division was assigned to the 32nd Army of the Reserve Front west of Moscow with about 10,000 men assigned. On 29 August 1941 the division was transferred to the 33rd Army, but remained in army reserves until 26 September when it was renamed the 18th Rifle Division (III Formation) of the regular army.

=== 18th Rifle Division ===
Still assigned to the 33rd Army of the Reserve Front when the German offensive against Moscow, Operation Typhoon, struck the Western, Bryansk, and Reserve Fronts. On 3 October the division engaged the Germans at the bend of the Dnieper River near the villages of Volovhek Kamenetz. On 5–6 October the division was surrounded and broke out on 12 October. On 20 October the division reentered the line near Skirmanovo, west of Istria along with the 17th Rifle Division. In the middle of November the division recaptured the village of Skirmanovo. The division managed to halt the advance of the 11th and 5th Panzer Divisions.

On 6 December 1941 the division participated in the Winter Counter-Offensive forcing across the Istra River.

On 5 January 1942, in recognition of its defensive and offensive fighting the division was renamed the 11th Guards Rifle Division.

==== Subordinate units ====
Sources:

- 52nd (Militia) Rifle Regiment became 1306th Rifle Regiment (disbanded 7 Dec 41)
- 53rd (Militia) Rifle Regiment became 1308th Rifle Regiment (disbanded 26 Dec 41)
- 54th (Militia) Rifle Regiment became 1310th Rifle Regiment (detached 22 Oct 41)
- Artillery Battalion became 978th Artillery Regiment becomes 30th Guards Artillery Regiment
- 365th Rifle Regiment (from 22 Oct 41) became 33rd Guards Rifle Regiment
- 518th Rifle Regiment (from 28 November 1941) becomes 40th Guards Rifle Regiment
- 282nd Rifle Regiment (from 13 December 1941) becomes 27th Guards Rifle Regiment (formally with the 19th Rifle Division)
- 702nd Separate Antiaircraft Artillery Battalion becomes 8th Guards Sep AA Artillery Battery (formally 146th Sep. AA Artillery Battery)
- 477th Reconnaissance Company becomes 9th Guards Reconnaissance Company
- 461st Sapper Battalion becomes 15th Guards Sapper Battalion
- 866th Separate Signals Battalion becomes 12th Sep. Signals Battalion
- 500th Medical Battalion becomes 381st Medical Battalion
- 344th Decontamination Company becomes 14th Guards Decontamination Company
- 312th Auto-Transport Company becomes 504th Auto-Transport Company (formally 17th Auto-Transport Company)
- 927th Field Postal Station
- 394th Field Cash Office of the State Bank

=== 11th Guards Rifle Division ===
Formed on 5 January 1942 by converting the 18th Rifle Division.

Since January 1942 the division participated in offensive and defensive battles in the Gzhatsk direction. On 12 August 1942 it was placed in the reserve of the Western Front. On 14 August 1942 it took up defensive positions on the Zhizdra River from Gretna to the estuary. In the following days, in conjunction with the 32nd Tank Brigade it repulsed the attacks of the German 17th and 9th Panzer Divisions ("Operation Virbelvind"). On 18 August Kampfgruppe Seitz broke the division's defense and two battalions of the 33rd Guards Rifle Regiment and division headquarters were destroyed. The 40th and 27th Guards Rifle Regiments led by Major Sherbina continued to conduct the defense. The division was saved from further defeat by counterattack by the 9th Tank Corps and 326th Rifle Division. By 23 August the 40th and 33rd GRR retreated beyond the Drisenka River, where they counterattacked over the following days. By 26 August the division, pursuing the retreating enemy, crossed the Zhizdra River. From September 1942 until February 1943 Division occupied defenses south of the river Zhizdra at the turn of Gretna, the Eastern Ulyanovsk region and the Kaluga region.

Subsequently, it took part in the fighting in the Battle of Kursk, near Eagle. In October 1943 it was concentrated in the area of Nevel. There the division in conjunction with other parts of the army seized a large railway junction town on 24 December 1943. It participated in the Belorussian Strategic Offensive Operation (Operation Bagration), distinguished itself in the battles for Vitebsk, crossed the Niemen River, the city of Alytus, a foothold, and moved 60 kilometers in three days. Then it participated in the Gumbinnen Offensive, receiving the Order of Lenin on 14 November for its actions in the invasion of East Prussia. The 11th Guards fought in the East Prussian Strategic Offensive Operation, taking Königsberg, and the battles around Pilau.

On 1 May 1945 the division was part of the 16th Guards Rifle Corps of the 11th Guards Army, alongside the 1st Guards and 31st Guards Rifle Divisions. The division was transferred to the 8th Guards Rifle Corps in the same army, and was stationed at Mamonovo. It was disbanded in June 1946 after its corps was transferred to the Soviet airborne.

==== Subordinate units ====
- 27th Guards Rifle Regiment
- 33rd Guards Rifle Regiment
- 40th Guards Rifle Regiment
- 30th Guards Artillery Regiment
- 8th (146th) Guards antiaircraft battery (up to 19 Mar 1943)
- 22 Guards Mortar Battalion (up to 18 Nov 1942)
- 22 Guards Machine Gun Battalion (from 19 Nov 1942 to 25 Mar 1943)
- 9th Guards Reconnaissance Company
- 15th Guards Sapper Battalion
- 12th Guards Separate Signal Battalion (up to 21 Oct 1942)
- 12th Guards Separate Signal Company (from 21 Oct 2942 to 12 May 1944)
- 381 Medical Battalion
- 14th Guards separate company chemical protection
- 504th (I-17) trucking company
- I-500 (5th) field bakery
- 502 Division veterinary hospital

== Commanders ==
- Colonel P.K. Zhivalev - (26 Sep 1941 – 10 Nov 1941)
- Colonel P.N. Chernyshev - (11 Nov 1941 – 22 Aug 1942) Major General 5 Mar 1942
- Colonel I.K Sherbina (08/23/1942 - 29/08/1942)
- Major General A. Boreyko (30 Aug 1942 - 10 Nov 1942)
- Colonel I.K Sherbina (11 Nov 1942 - 16 Nov 1942)
- Colonel I. Fedyunkin (18 Nov 1942 - 22 Jul 1943) Major General 17 Nov 1942
- Brigade Commander A.I. Maksimov (23 Jul 1943 - 20 Feb 1944) Major General 1 Sep 1943
- Colonel N.G. Tsyganov (21 Feb 1944 - 9 May 1945) Major General 06 Mar 1944

== Sources ==
- Affairs Directorate of the Ministry of Defense of the Soviet Union (1967). Сборник приказов РВСР, РВС СССР, НКО и Указов Президиума Верховного Совета СССР о награждении орденами СССР частей, соединениий и учреждений ВС СССР. Часть I. 1920 - 1944 гг [Collection of orders of the RVSR, RVS USSR and NKO on awarding orders to units, formations and establishments of the Armed Forces of the USSR. Part I. 1920–1944] (PDF) (in Russian). Moscow. Archived from the original (PDF) on 27 March 2019.
- Crofoot, Craig, Armies of the Bear, orbat.com, 2003
- Feskov, V.I.; Golikov, V.I.; Kalashnikov, K.A.; Slugin, S.A. (2013). Вооруженные силы СССР после Второй Мировой войны: от Красной Армии к Советской [The Armed Forces of the USSR after World War II: From the Red Army to the Soviet: Part 1 Land Forces] (in Russian). Tomsk: Scientific and Technical Literature Publishing. ISBN 9785895035306.
- Robert G. Poirier and Albert Z. Conner, The Red Army Order of Battle in the Great Patriotic War, Novato: Presidio Press, 1985. ISBN 0-89141-237-9.
- Sharp Charles, C., Soviet Order of Battle World War II, Vol. IV, Red Guards, Soviet Guards Rifle and Airborne Units 1941 to 1945, George F. Nafziger, 1995.
- Sharp Charles, C., Soviet Order of Battle World War II, Vol. IX, Red Tide, Soviet Rifle Division Formed From June to December 1941, George F. Nafziger, 1996.
- Sharp Charles, C., Soviet Order of Battle World War II, Vol. X, Red Swarm, Soviet Rifle Division Formed From 1942 to 1946, George F. Nafziger, 1996.
