= Lyudmila Bosova =

Russian educator and author

Lyudmila Leonidovna Bosova
- Людмила Леонидовна Босова
- Born: 9 May 1963; Soviet Union
- Died: 15 December 2024 (aged 61); Russia
- Education: Belarusian State University
- Scientific career
- Fields: Computer science, pedagogy

Lyudmila Leonidovna Bosova (9 May 1963 – 15 December 2024) was a Russian educator and author, known for her contributions to the field of school informatics. She authored numerous textbooks and educational programs, significantly influencing the teaching of computer science in Russian schools.

== Early life and education ==
Bosova graduated from the Faculty of Mechanics and Mathematics at Belarusian State University in 1985. She later pursued postgraduate studies at the Institute of Content and Teaching Methods of the Russian Academy of Education, earning her Candidate of Pedagogical Sciences degree in 2000 with a dissertation titled "Propedeutic Training of Rural Schoolchildren in Informatics and Information Technologies." In 2009, she completed her doctoral dissertation, "Development of the Methodological System for Teaching Informatics and Information Technologies to Younger Schoolchildren," earning her Doctor of Pedagogical Sciences degree.

== Career ==
Bosova's career encompassed roles as a mathematician-programmer at the "Integral" production association in Minsk (1985–1986) and as an engineer-programmer at the V.I. Lenin All-Union Electrotechnical Institute in Moscow (1986–1991). She then transitioned to education, serving as a computer science teacher at Ivanovskaya Secondary School in the Istra district of Moscow Oblast from 1991 to 2022.

From 2001 to 2011, Bosova held positions as a senior researcher, head of laboratory, and deputy director for research at the Institute of Informatization of Education of the Russian Academy of Education. She later served as deputy head and chief researcher at the Center for Educational Information Technologies, Resources, and Networks of the Federal Institute for Educational Development from 2011 to 2016.

In academia, Bosova led the Laboratory of Mathematical, Natural Science Education, and Informatization at the Research Institute of Metropolitan Education of the Moscow City Pedagogical University (2012–2014). She also chaired the Department of Mathematics and Informatics in Primary School at the Institute of Childhood of Moscow State Pedagogical University (2014–2017) and later the Department of Theory and Methods of Teaching Informatics at the Institute of Mathematics and Informatics (2017–2018).

== Contributions ==
Bosova authored over 250 scientific and methodological works in the field of teaching informatics. She developed educational and methodological complexes for the course "Informatics and ICT" for primary and secondary schools (grades 5–9), including widely used textbooks and teaching aids.

== Honors and awards ==
Bosova received several accolades for her contributions to education, including:

- Honored Teacher of the Russian Federation (2007)
- Russian Federation Government Prize in Education (2009) for a series of works titled "Informatization of General, Professional, and Additional Education in Health-Saving Conditions"
- Medal of K.D. Ushinsky (2016)
- Honorary Worker of Education of the Russian Academy of Education (2023)
