= Pyotr Solodukhin =

Russian Red Army divisional commander (1892–1920)

- Born: 24 January 1892; Vasilevka, Samara Governorate, Russian Empire
- Died: 8 August 1920 (aged 28) Kherson Oblast, Ukrainian People's Republic
- Buried: Monument to the Fighters of the Revolution, Field of Mars, Saint Petersburg
- Allegiance: Russian Empire; Russian Soviet Federative Socialist Republic
- Branch: Imperial Russian Army; Red Army
- Commands: 6th Rifle Division; 15th Rifle Division; 9th Rifle Division
- Conflicts: First World War; Russian Civil War

Pyotr Andrianovich Solodukhin (Russian: Пётр Андрианович Солодухин; 24 January 1892 – 8 August 1920) was a Russian military figure and Bolshevik division commander in the Russian Civil War. He joined the Red Army after having previously fought in the Imperial Russian Army in the First World War. One of the early recipients of the Order of the Red Banner, he saw action against Allied interventionists in the north, the forces of White generals Nikolai Yudenich around Petrograd, and Anton Denikin in the south, and was killed in action fighting against troops of Pyotr Wrangel at the Kakhovka bridgehead in August 1920.

== Early life and commands ==
Solodukhin was born on 24 January 1892 in the village of Vasilevka, in what was then Samara Governorate, in the Russian Empire. His mother, Matryona Andrianovna, died after being shot, with his father, Andrian Antonovich, dying not long after. Orphaned at a young age, he completed his studies at the Vasilyevsky parochial school, and at the Samara railway school, and went to work in Ufa Governorate. He worked for a time on hydraulic engineering surveys in Temir District, Turgay Oblast.

On the outbreak of the First World War Solodukhin became a non-commissioned officer in the 78th Reserve Petersburg Rifle Regiment. He joined the Bolsheviks after the October Revolution in 1917 and was elected to the Petrograd Soviet. He was briefly a worker at the Sestroretsk arms factory, but with his military experience, Solodukhin was in spring 1918 dispatched to the front as the Russian Civil War was fought. Achieving success in combat as commander of a detachment, he was appointed commander of a division on the Northern Front and took part in the capture of the city of Shenkursk in Arkhangelsk Governorate in early 1919. His performance in the fighting led to his award of the Order of the Red Banner, becoming one of the first in the Red Army to receive this decoration. By late 1919 Solodukhin and his command had been recalled to Petrograd to defend the city against the forces of White general Nikolai Yudenich, which were approaching the city. Solodukhin was appointed commander of the 6th Rifle Division and in November pushed Yudenich back, liberating Yamburg on 5 August 1919. Solodukhin was then deployed to the Southern Front, where he became commander of the 9th Rifle Division, serving alongside political commissar Semyon Voskov. Here Solodukhin and the division were in action against White general Anton Denikin's forces during the Orel–Kursk operation, pushing them out of dozens of cities.

== Final command and death ==
As the Red Army advanced against the remaining White forces in southern Ukraine, Solodukhin, by now having been appointed to command the 15th Rifle Division, came up against those of Pyotr Wrangel. The Red Army strategy aimed to cut off the White forces from their sources of supply in the Crimea. On 6 August 1920 Solodukhin received orders to take his division across to the left bank of the Dnieper under cover of night. Solodukhin chose a place between the settlements of Lvovo and Tyaginka to make the crossing. Simultaneously the 52nd and Latvian divisions were to cross the Dnieper in the area of Beryslav, and the Kherson group in the area of Kherson. Solodukhin's division was tasked with capturing the Korsun Monastery, fortified by White forces, the 52nd and the Latvian divisions were to capture Malaya and Bolshaya Kakhovka, and the Kherson group the village of Aleshki. If successful, this would open the way for the Red Army's Pravoberezhnaya group to advance on Perekop and Melitopol to join up with elements of 13th Army, and cut Wrangel's forces off from its Crimean bases.

The operation began at 2 o'clock in the morning on 7 August, with Solodukhin's forces successfully forcing a crossing of the Dnieper under enemy fire. The 127th Mtsensk, 128th Tula and 129th Kursk Regiments, part of the 43rd Brigade, led the crossing. By 8 o'clock, the Korsun Monastery had been taken by the 127th Mtsensk Regiment and a bridgehead with a radius of 15-20 km had been established. At dawn on 8 August Solodukhin deployed the 44th Brigade to link up with the Kakhovka bridgehead. In an attempt to push back the Red forces, the White's 34th Infantry Division, supported by cavalry, artillery, armored cars and aviation attacked between Bolshaya Mayachka and Chornyanka, dividing the 43rd and 45th Brigades and advancing on Korsun Monastery. Solodukhin gathered a cavalry force of his own and launched a counterattack, but he and his entire force was killed. When later captured and interrogated, some of the White force involved in the battle reported

Among the wounded was one of yours with the Order of the Red Banner. He was wounded in the leg and both arms. To the offer of the lieutenant to surrender, he replied: "We, the Communists, do not surrender to the mercy of the White Guard bastards!" Immediately one of the officers shot him at point-blank range.

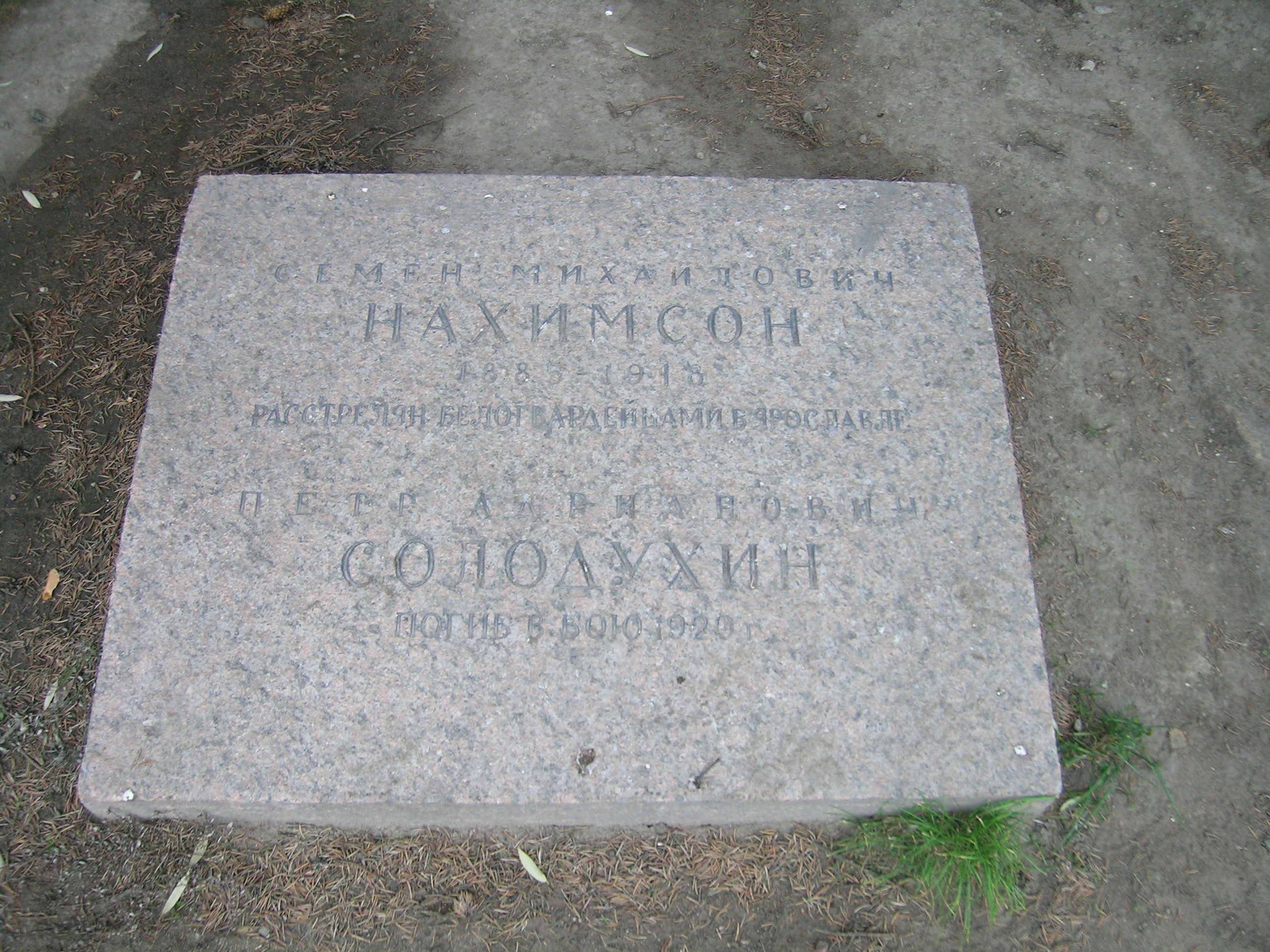
Memorial plaque to Pyotr Solodukhin and Semyon Nakhimson at the Monument to the Fighters of the Revolution

Solodukhin's body was sent to Petrograd and he was buried at the Monument to the Fighters of the Revolution, on the Field of Mars, on 22 August. His commissar in the 9th Rifle Division, Semyon Voskov, is also buried at the monument, having died of typhus in Taganrog after that city had been taken by the Red Army.

== Awards and honours ==
A street in the urban-type settlement of Bezenchuk, in Solodukhin's home region of the Bezenchuksky District, is named after him.

Military offices
Preceded by Boris Freiman	Commander of the 6th Rifle Division; 1919	Succeeded by Nikolai Rozanov
Preceded by Vasily Glagolev	Commander of the 9th Rifle Division; 1919-1920	Succeeded by Nikolay Kuibyshev
Preceded by Eduard Lepin	Commander of the 15th Rifle Division; July–August 1920	Succeeded by Johannes Raudmets
