= General Belov =

General Belov may refer to:

- Ivan Belov (commander) (1893–1938), Soviet military commander
- Nikolay Belov (general) (1896–1941), Red Army major general in World War II
- Pavel Belov (1897–1963), Soviet Army colonel general
