= Nikolay Belov =

Nikolay or Nikolai Belov may refer to:

- Nikolay Belov (geochemist) (1891–1982), Soviet crystallographer and geochemist
- Nikolay Belov (general) (1896–1941), Red Army World War II major-general
- Nikolay Belov (wrestler) (1919–1987), Soviet wrestler
- Nikolai Belov (ice hockey) (born 1987), Russian ice hockey player
