= Alexey Mikhaylov (officer) =

Alexey Iosifovich Mikhaylov
- Mikhaylov, c. 1940
- Born: 4 October 1895; Okhotino, Smolensk Governorate, Russian Empire
- Died: October 1941 (aged 45–46)
- Allegiance: Russian Empire; Russian SFSR; Soviet Union
- Branch: Imperial Russian Army; Red Army
- Service years: 1915–1917; 1919–1941
- Rank: Colonel
- Commands: 161st Rifle Division
- Conflicts: World War I; Russian Civil War; World War II
- Awards: Order of the Red Banner

Alexey Iosifovich Mikhaylov (Russian: Алексе́й Ио́сифович Миха́йлов; 4 October 1895 – October 1941) was a Red Army colonel killed in World War II.

Mikhaylov became a junior officer during World War I and was captured by Bulgarian troops in early 1917. Returning to Russia on the end of the war, he was drafted into the Red Army and served in the suppression of the Kronstadt rebellion and the East Karelian uprising. He held command and staff positions between the wars and on the outbreak of Operation Barbarossa commanded the 161st Rifle Division in Belarus. Mikhaylov led the division in the Battle of Smolensk, but was relieved of command in late August. Serving in an army headquarters position, he was killed in the Vyazma pocket later that year.

== Early life, World War I, and Russian Civil War ==
Mikhaylov was born on 4 October 1895 in the village of Okhotino, Tumanovsky volost, Smolensk Governorate. Mobilized into the Imperial Russian Army in August 1915 during World War I, he was sent to the Northwestern Front, where he became a private in the 2nd Reserve Regiment. In November he was transferred to the 176th Infantry Regiment before studying at the Pskov School of Ensigns from March to June 1916. After graduating from the school with the rank of ensign, Mikhaylov returned to the 176th Regiment and served as a junior officer and company commander. In October he was sent to the Romanian Front, where he commanded a company of the 37th Siberian Rifle Regiment. In January 1917, during the retreat from Dobruja, Mikhaylov was wounded and concussed in battle at Măcin, being taken prisoner by Bulgarian soldiers. Held in prisoner of war camps in Sofia and Orhanie, Mikhaylov was released when the war ended and returned to Russia in December 1918, being invalided out of service.

During the Russian Civil War, he was drafted into the Red Army in Petrograd in August 1919 and appointed a company commander in the 10th Reserve Regiment of the Northwestern Front. He commanded a march battalion of the front from September 1920, and in December became a company commander in the 96th Rifle Regiment of the 32nd Brigade of the 11th Rifle Division. With the division, he fought in the suppression of the Kronstadt rebellion, receiving a silver watch for capturing a battery. From May 1921 he served as an assistant battalion commander of the divisional training regiment. Mikhaylov and his unit subsequently participated in the suppression of the East Karelian uprising between December 1921 and March 1922. For capturing the Volazminsky factory, he was awarded the Order of the Red Banner, in addition to the To the Valiant Soldier of the Karelian Front badge for participating in the operation.

== Interwar period ==
In the interwar period Mikhaylov served with the 33rd Rifle Regiment, formed from the training regiment of the 11th Rifle Division, stationed in the Leningrad Military District, from June 1922 as a company commander, assistant battalion commander, battalion commander and as assistant regimental commander for supply. After completing the Vystrel course between November 1929 and January 1930, he was appointed assistant commander for personnel of the 30th Rifle Regiment of the 10th Rifle Division.

Mikhaylov was transferred to the North Caucasus Military District in October 1930, successively serving as chief of the 7th, 8th, and 10th departments of the district staff. He became a colonel in 1935 when the Red Army introduced personal military ranks. In May 1936 Mikhaylov was appointed commander of the 37th Rifle Regiment of the 13th Rifle Division, stationed in the Belorussian Special Military District. He retook the Vystrel course beginning in November 1937 and graduated with honors in August 1938, returning to the district to serve as chief of staff of the 2nd Belorussian Rifle Division. With the latter he participated in the Soviet invasion of Poland. From July 1940 Mikhaylov commanded the newly formed 161st Rifle Division of the Western Special Military District (the former Belorussian Special Military District) in Mogilev.

== World War II ==
Just before the war began, Mikhaylov told district commander Army General Dmitry Pavlov that the division was not combat ready as it lacked motor vehicles and its anti-aircraft artillery had a shell shortage, but was dismissed with the response "if you have no shells, you will fight with your teeth and fists". When Operation Barbarossa began on 22 June 1941, he commanded the division as part of the 2nd Rifle Corps of the 13th, then the 20th Armies of the Western Front in heavy defensive battles on the Minsk-Moscow Highway and the Battle of Smolensk. In late July the 161st was withdrawn to the Gzhatsk area for rebuilding, and on 6 August with the 20th Army was sent into combat in the Yelnya area to fight in the battles to eliminate the German salient there. On 20 August, Mikhaylov was relieved of command for being "unable to control fighting in modern conditions." The division commissar and chief of staff were also dismissed from their positions. He became chief of the army personnel department. With the 20th Army, he was trapped in the Vyazma pocket in October, and was killed in action there.
