= Vladimir Janjgava =

Soviet lieutenant general (1907–1982)

- Janjgava, c. 1943-1945
- Born: 19 May 1907; Khoni Municipality, Russian Empire
- Died: 10 April 1982 (aged 74) Tbilisi, Georgian SSR, Soviet Union
- Allegiance: Soviet Union
- Branch: Soviet Army
- Service years: 1927–1959
- Rank: Lieutenant General
- Commands: 676th Rifle Regiment; 15th Rifle Division; 354th Rifle Division; Soviet infantry corps
- Conflicts: World War II; Winter War; Eastern Front; Battle of Voronezh; Battle for Kursk; East Prussian Offensive; East Pomeranian Offensive; Battle of Berlin
- Awards: Hero of the Soviet Union

Vladimir Nikolayevich Janjgava (Georgian: ვლადიმერ ჯანჯღავა; 19 May 1907 – 10 April 1982) was a Georgian Soviet Army lieutenant general and Hero of the Soviet Union who participated in battles during the Winter War and was a specialist in infantry warfare during World War II. Janigava held command of various infantry regiments, divisions and corps of the Soviet Army. Janjgava served in a series of leadership roles after the war, including as Minister of Internal Affairs of Georgian SSR (1954—1958).

== Early life ==
Vladimir Janjgava was born in the Georgian village of Gubi in May 1907. After graduating he entered the Red Army in 1927 and specialized in military warfare at the Transcaucasus Military-Infantry School in the capital city of Tbilisi. During his service in various Soviet Army formations during Pre-World War II, he rose through the ranks and participated in the Winter War as a junior officer.

== World War II ==
In 1941 when the Great Patriotic War broke out, Janjgava, who had already reached the rank of colonel, took part in various defensive operations against German forces in Moldavia and Donets Basin. From March 1942 to April 1943 he commanded the 676th Rifle Regiment and was engaged in critical defensive operations in and around the city of Voronezh, as well as the 1st and 2nd Kastornoye operations, both being part of the greater Voronezh-Voroshilovgrad Strategic Defensive. In July 1943 he took command of the Soviet 15th Rifle Division and was responsible for leading the general infantry assault on the left flank of the Soviet armies during the Battle of Kursk.

From 1944 he led the 354th Rifle Division, which was successively part of the 1st and 2nd Belorussian Fronts, and participated in the liberation of Belorussia and Poland and, more importantly, the advance through East-Prussia and finally the attack on Berlin. At this point, major general Janjgava skillfully managed to divide the fronts at the Weichsel, Narew and Oder rivers. The division fought over a total distance of 1,000 kilometers, liberated Szczecin and participated in the liberation of a total of 20 other cities, before finally reaching Berlin. For outstanding performance and personal courage, Janjgava was awarded the title Hero of the Soviet Union and received various other decorations.

== Post-war ==
After the war, he commanded the division until February 1946, when he was sent to study. In 1948 he graduated from the Higher Military Academy named after K. E. Voroshilov. He was promoted to general-lieutenant. From May 1948 to January 1951 he commanded the 10th Guards Rifle Division in the Transcaucasus Military District (from July 1949 - 10th Guards Mountain Rifle Division]]). From January 1951 to November 1953, he commanded the 13th Mountain Rifle Corps in the Transcaucasian Military District. Since November 1953 - commander of the 79th Rifle Corps in the Group of Soviet Forces in Germany. From May 1954 to December 1958 - Minister of Internal Affairs of the Georgian SSR, while continued to remain in the cadres of the Soviet Army. As the head of the Ministry of Internal Affairs of Georgia, he took an active part is suppressing the 1956 Tbilisi Riots.

Later, he worked as director of the military department of the Tbilisi State University. Later he also became the leader of the DOSAAF central committee in the Georgian SSR. Vladimir Janjgava died on 10 April 1982 at the age of 75. He was buried in a cemetery near Tbilisi.
