= Istrinsky District =

Istrinsky District Истринский район (Russian)
- District
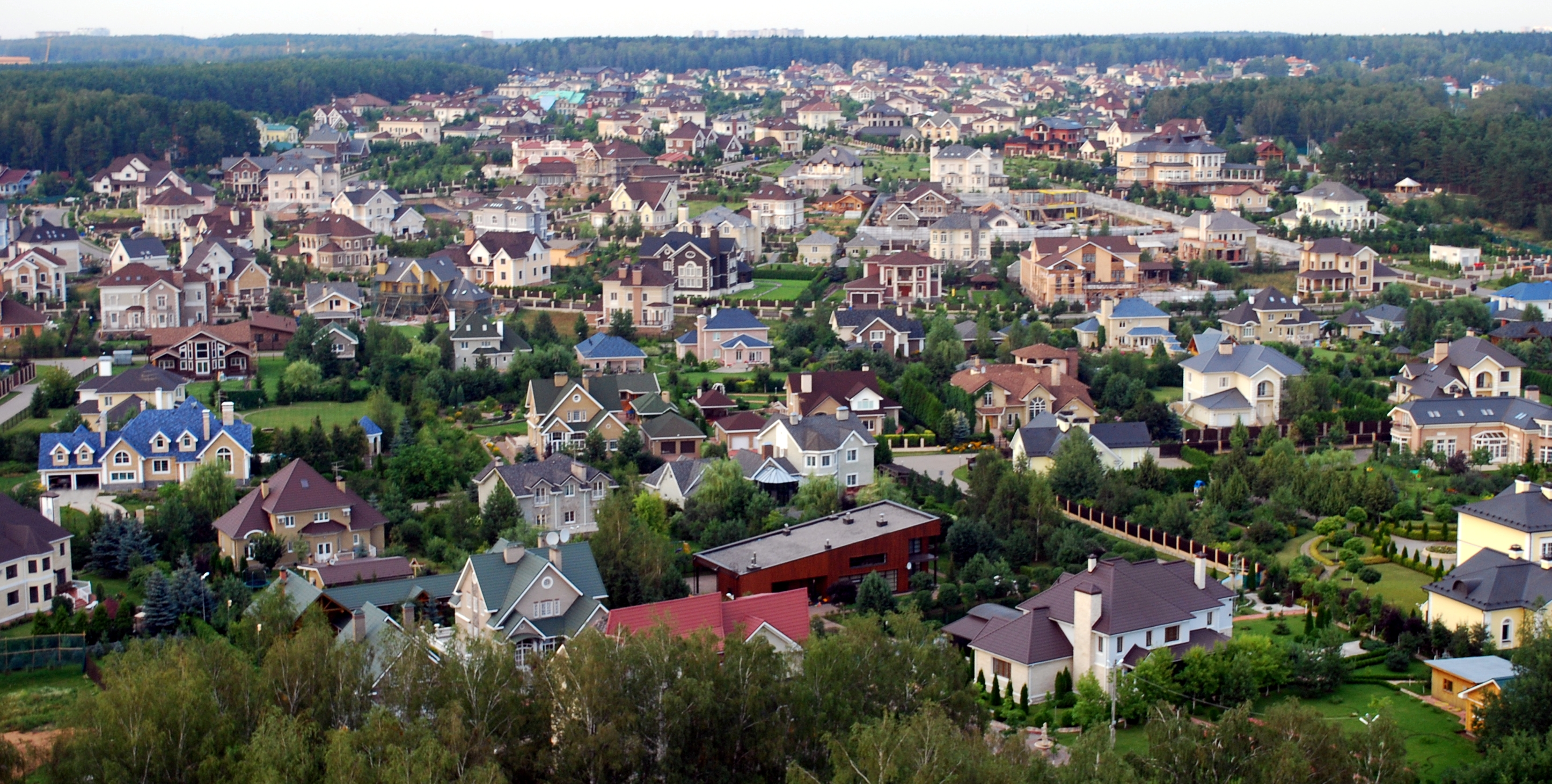
- Veledniovo, Istrinsky District

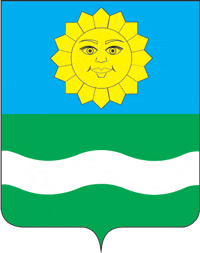
- Flag Coat of arms
- Location of Istrinsky District in Moscow Oblast (prior to July 2012)
- Coordinates: 55°55′N 36°52′E
- Country: Russia
- Federal subject: Moscow Oblast
- Established: 12 July 1929
- Administrative center: Istra

Area
  - Total: 1,268.97 km^{2} (489.95 sq mi)

Population (2010 Census)
  - Total: 119,641
  - Density: 94.2820/km^{2} (244.189/sq mi)
  - Urban: 56.3%
  - Rural: 43.7%

Administrative structure
  - Administrative divisions: 2 Towns, 1 Suburban settlements, 11 Rural settlements
  - Inhabited localities: 2 cities/towns, 1 urban-type settlements, 237 rural localities

Municipal structure
  - Municipally incorporated as: Istrinsky Municipal District
  - Municipal divisions: 3 urban settlements, 11 rural settlements

Istrinsky District (Russian: И́стринский райо́н) is an administrative and municipal district (raion), one of the thirty-six in Moscow Oblast, Russia. It is located in the western central part of the oblast. The area of the district is 1,268.97 square kilometers (489.95 sq mi). Its administrative center is the town of Istra. Population: 119,641 (2010 census); 115,753 (2002 Census); 90,572 (1989 Soviet census). The population of Istra accounts for 29.3% of the district's total population.

== Geography ==
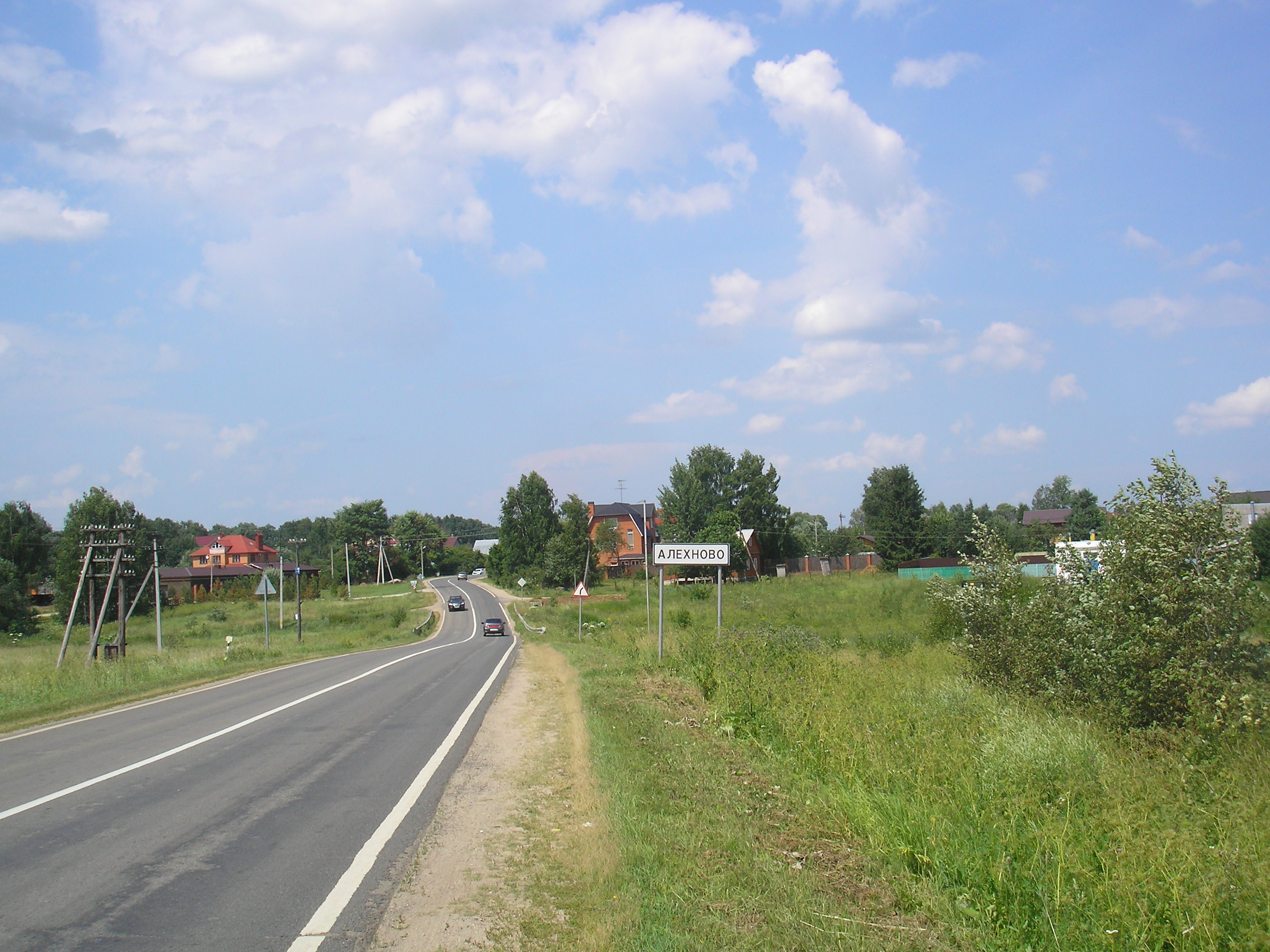
Alyokhnovo

The Istra River flows through the district.

Alyokhnovo is one of the rural communities in the district.
