= Istra (inhabited locality) =

Istra (Russian: Истра) is the name of two inhabited localities in Moscow Oblast, Russia.

Urban localities

- Istra, Istrinsky District, Moscow Oblast, a town in Istrinsky District

Rural localities

- Istra, Krasnogorsky District, Moscow Oblast, a settlement in Ilyinskoye Rural Settlement of Krasnogorsky District
