= Eduard Lepin =

Soviet commander (1889-1938)

Eduard Davydovich Lepin
- Born: 1889; Riga, Governorate of Livonia, Russian Empire
- Died: 22 August 1938 (aged 48–49) Kommunarka shooting ground, Moscow Oblast, Soviet Union
- Allegiance: Soviet Union
- Branch: Soviet Red Army
- Rank: Komkor
- Commands: 15th Rifle Division; 35th Rifle Division; 13th Rifle Corps
- Conflicts: World War I Russian Civil War

Eduard Davydovich Lepin (Russian: Эдуа́рд Давы́дович Ле́пин, Latvian: Eduards Liepiņš; 1889 – 22 August 1938) was a Soviet division commander and Komkor of Latvian ethnicity. He fought in the Russian Civil War against the White movement. Lepin was a recipient of the Order of the Red Banner.

During the Great Purge, as a part of the so-called "Latvian Operation", Lepin was arrested on 2 December 1937 and shot at the Kommunarka shooting ground on 22 August 1938. In 1956, after the death of Joseph Stalin, he was rehabilitated.

Preceded by Alexander Sedyakin	Commander of the 15th Rifle Division; June–July 1920	Succeeded by Pyotr Solodukhin
Preceded by Kasyan Chaykovsky	Commander of the 35th Rifle Division; 1924–1925	Succeeded by Anatoly Tarasov
Preceded by Ivan Fedko	Commander of the 13th Rifle Corps; 1925–1930	Succeeded by Vitaly Primakov
