= 161st Mechanized Brigade =

Ukrainian army unit 1993–2003

161st Mechanized Brigade (1992 – 2003, 2024 – 2025) 161st Motor Rifle Division (1965 – 1992) 99th Motor Rifle Division (1957 – 1965) 24th Mechanised Division (1955 – 1957) 161st Rifle Division (1940 – 1941, 1942 – 1955)
- 161 окрема механізована бригада
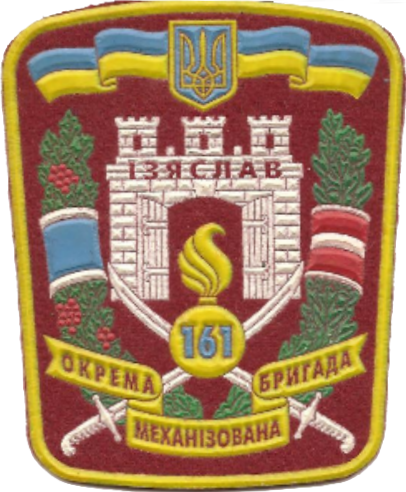
- Shoulder sleeve insignia
- Active: Summer 2024 – 2025
- Country: Ukraine
- Branch: Ukrainian Ground Forces
- Role: Mechanized Infantry
- Engagements: 2022 Russian Invasion of Ukraine

The 161st Mechanised Brigade, formerly the 161st Stanislav Red Banner Order of Bohdan Khmelnytskyi Mechanised Brigade, was a brigade of the Ukrainian Ground Forces.

== 1st Formation ==
The division first formed from July 1 to Aug. 28, 1940, at Mogilev in the Western Special Military District based on cadres from 143rd Rifle Division and the 342nd and 356th Reserve Regiments, under the command of Colonel Alexey Mikhaylov. At the opening of Operation Barbarossa the division was in the same district and had the following order of battle:

- 477th Rifle Regiment
- 542nd Rifle Regiment
- 603rd Rifle Regiment
- 628th Light Artillery Regiment
- 632nd Howitzer Regiment
- 135th Antitank Battalion
- 475th Antiaircraft Battalion
- 245th Reconnaissance Battalion
- 154th Sapper Battalion
- 422nd Signal Battalion
- 169th Medical Battalion

In May the division had been brought up to a strength of about 12,000 men with the addition of workers and collective farmers, including 396 Communist Party members and candidates and 2,170 Komsomols, indicating a high proportion of younger and well-motivated men. In addition, a high proportion of senior leaders had combat experience from the Winter War.

On June 22, 1941, 161st Rifle Division was in transit from Drutyskie Camp in Mogilev Oblast to join 44th Rifle Corps near Minsk. Caught up in the confused fighting east of that city, it fought in 13th Army under both 44th and 2nd Rifle Corps. In August it was reassigned to 20th Army of Western Front, and on the 15th it reported the following strength figures: 695 officers; 787 NCOs; 5,306 men plus 400 replacements just received; 5,464 rifles; 32 SMGs; 20 HMGs; 74 LMGs; 1 AAMG; 12 76mm guns; and no antitank guns, howitzers or mortars. The division distinguished itself in the Battle of Smolensk for its stubborn defensive fighting and local counterattacks, and it was withdrawn to the Reserve of the Supreme High Command in September. On Sept. 18, in recognition of its earlier distinctions and its success in the Yelnya Offensive, the 161st became the fourth of the original four rifle divisions raised to the status of Guards on that date.

== 2nd Formation ==
A new 161st Rifle Division formed from Apr. 16 to July 2, 1942, based on a cadre from 13th Rifle Brigade in the Moscow Military District. (The 13th Rifle Brigade had been formed during Autumn, 1941 in the South Caucasus Military District). The order of battle of the new division was as follows:

- 565th Rifle Regiment
- 569th Rifle Regiment
- 575th Rifle Regiment
- 1036th Artillery Regiment
- 413th Antitank Battalion
- 336th Sapper Battalion
- 820th Mortar Battalion (1942 only)
- 467th Antiaircraft Battery
- 242nd Reconnaissance Company
- 925th Signal Battalion (1944-45 only)
- 251st Medical Battalion

A division commander was finally assigned at the beginning of July, when the division was assigned to 3rd Reserve Army in the Reserve of the Supreme High Command. On July 10 this army became the 2nd formation of the 60th Army and joined Voronezh Front. In August the 161st was moved to 38th Army in the same Front, and on Dec. 18 became part of 18th (Separate) Rifle Corps, which in Feb. 1943 formed the basis for the 69th Army, but within a month the division was moved to 40th Army. During these months the division was participating in the winter counteroffensive that partly surrounded and destroyed German 2nd Army, and as this ground to a halt in the spring it found itself well into what became known as the Kursk salient.

In preparation for the Battle of Kursk, 40th Army was in the first echelon of the Voronezh Front defenses, but west of 6th Guards Army, which took the brunt of the German assault, and therefore saw little action. In August the division became part of 47th Rifle Corps. During the Battle of the Dniepr, on Sept. 23, the 161st forced a crossing of the river at Zarubentsy, becoming part of the Bukrin Bridgehead, and 32 men were awarded the Gold Star of the Hero of the Soviet Union. At the end of 1943 the division was moved to 18th Army, still in the same (now renamed 1st Ukrainian) Front, and in April 1944, was once again moved to that front's 38th Army. Just before the Lvov–Sandomierz Offensive in July the 161st became part of 1st Guards Army, and it was here that it won the honorific "Stanislav" for liberating the Polish town of Stanislav during that operation. In August, 1st Guards Army was reassigned to 4th Ukrainian Front, and apart from a few weeks back again in 18th Army, the division served in that army and that front for the duration as part of 107th Rifle Corps. It ended the war with the official title of 161st Rifle, Stanislav, Order of the Red Banner, Order of Bogdan Khmelnitsky Division. (Russian: 161-я стрелковая Станиславская Краснознамённая ордена Богдана Хмельницкого дивизия.)

=== Postwar ===
24th Mechanised Division by 1955, 99th Motor Rifle Division 1957, then became 161st Motor Rifle Division in January 1965.

== 161st Motor Rifle Division ==
For most of the 1980s it was part of the 13th Army (Soviet Union) and its headquarters was located at Izyaslav.

In the late 1980s the 161st Motor Rifle Division comprised:

- 161st Stanislavskaya Red Banner Order of Bogdan Khmelnitsky Motor Rifle Division, Izyaslav
  - Division Headquarters (1 R-156BTR)
  - 57th Guards Danube Orders of Suvorov and Kutuzov Motor Rifle Regiment Izyaslav (31 Т-54, 35 BMP-1, 2 BRM-1K)
  - 313th Motor Rifle Regiment, Rovno (30 Т-55, 3 BMP-1, 2 БРМ-1К)
  - 316th Motor Rifle Regiment, Izyaslav (31 Т-54, 3 BMP-1, 2 БРМ-1К)
  - 83rd Guards Tank Regiment, Izyaslav (28 Т-55, 66 Т-54, 14 BMP-1, 2 БРМ-1К)
  - 1036th Self-Propelled Artillery Regiment, Izyaslav (12 BM-21 Grad)
  - 1067th Anti-Aircraft Rocket Regiment, Izyaslav
  - 1297th Separate Anti-Tank Artillery Battalion, Izyaslav
  - 92nd Separate Reconnaissance Battalion, Izyaslav (10 BMP-1, 7 BRM-1K, 1 BTR-70, 2 R-145BM)
  - 925th Separate Communications Battalion, Izyaslav (8 R-145BM, 1 R-137B)
  - 336th Separate Engineer-Sapper Battalion, Izyaslav (2 UR-67)
  - 660th Separate Material Support Battalion
  - 184th Separate Equipment Maintenance and Recovery Battalion

Total: 186 tanks, 80 BMP, 1 BTR, 12 MLRS

In January 1992 the division became part of the Ukrainian Ground Forces, but was soon reorganized as the 161st Separate Mechanised Brigade on 1 December 1993 while the 13th Army became the 13th Army Corps. Under the reorganization, the division's 1067th Anti-Aircraft Rocket Regiment shifted to army corps control but on 1 July 1996 transferred to the 28th Air Defence Corps. Under the new structure, the 161st Mechanised Brigade included two mechanized and two tank battalions. Artillery support was provided by self-propelled howitzer and anti-aircraft rocket battalions while logistics elements formed the separate rear support, technical and medical battalion. It was disbanded in 2003 during large-scale reductions of the Ukrainian Ground Forces. In November of that year its former garrison was transferred to the local authorities.

== 3rd Formation ==
In 2024 the brigade was revived again before being disbanded in 2025.
