= Alexander Sedyakin =

Soviet division commander

Alexander Ignatyevich Sedyakin
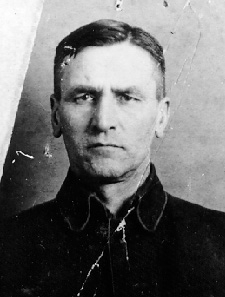
- Born: 26 November 1893; St. Petersburg, Russian Empire
- Died: 29 July 1938 (aged 44); Moscow, Soviet Union
- Allegiance: Soviet Union
- Service / branch: Soviet Red Army
- Rank: Komandarm 2nd rank
- Commands: 15th Rifle Division
- Battles / wars: World War I; Russian Civil War; Kronstadt rebellion; East Karelian uprising
- Awards: Order of the Red Banner (2); Order of Saint Stanislaus, 2nd class; Order of Saint Anna, 4th class; Saint George Sword; To the Valiant Soldier of the Karelian Front

Alexander Ignatyevich Sedyakin (26 November 1893 – 29 July 1938) was a Soviet division commander and Komandarm 2nd rank. He was born in St. Petersburg, which was then the capital of the Russian Empire. He fought in the Imperial Russian Army in World War I before going over to the Bolsheviks. He fought against Finland and the pro-Finnish separatists of the Republic of East Karelia in East Karelia. On November 11, 1935, he was one of the 10 people made Komandarm 2nd rank. He received the Order of the Red Banner twice (1921 and 1922).

== Early life ==
Sedyakin was born in St. Petersburg, which was then the capital of the Russian Empire. He was the oldest in a family of 4 boys and a girl. A member of his family served in the Preobrazhensky Regiment. His siblings were brothers Konstantin (1898), Theophylakt (1899), Mikhail (1903) and sister Klavdia (1907). In 1908, the family moved to Kurgan. After staying briefly in Krasnoyarsk, Sedyakin worked as a surveyor in Tobolsk Governorate, in modern-day Tyumen Oblast.

== World War I ==
In November 1914, Sedyakin enlisted in the Imperial Russian Army. After being commissioned an officer in October 1915, he was sent to the front as a lieutenant in the 151st infantry regiment. During his two years on the front lines, he was wounded twice and was promoted to senior captain. He rose from platoon commander to company, battalion and then regiment commander. After the February Revolution in March 1917, he was made chair of the regimental committee. He was made vice chairman of the soldiers' committee for the 38th Infantry Division in May 1917 and formally joined the Bolsheviks in August 1917. After the October Revolution in November 1917, he was elected to the Constituent Assembly.

== Civil War ==
In March 1918, Sedyakin formally joined the Red Army alongside soldiers he had formerly commanded. In May 1918, Sedyakin was conscription officer for the 2nd Pskov Rifle Division. On 6 August 1918 Sedyakin was on Eastern Front battling the forces of Alexander Kolchak. In September 1918, he was on the Southern Front, where he was appointed commander of the 2nd Kursk Infantry Brigade in November 1918 and deputy commander of the 13th Army in January 1919. In this capacity, he battled the forces of Anton Denikin. He was appointed commander of the 3rd Rifle Brigade of Voronezh in August 1919 and the 31st Rifle Division on 12 October 1919. On 12 November 1919 he moved his forces against those of Pyotr Nikolayevich Wrangel until he was incapacitated by injury. From October 1920 to February 1921, Sedyakin was commander of the 10th Reserve Rifle Brigade.

He was executed during the Great Purge and posthumously rehabilitated in 1956.

== Awards ==
- Order of the Red Banner (1921, 1922)
- Order of Saint Stanislaus 2nd class
- Order of Saint Anna 4th class (1917)
- Saint George Sword (1917)
- To the Valiant Soldier of the Karelian Front (1933)

Preceded by Mikhail Sangursky	Commander of the 15th Rifle Division; February–June 1920	Succeeded by Eduards Lepin
Preceded by Sergei Mratschowski	Commander of the Volga Military District; 1924–1927	Succeeded by Georgy Bazilevich

== Bibliography ==
Радиоконтроль – Тачанка / [под общ. ред. Н. В. Огаркова]. – М. : Военное изд-во М-ва обороны СССР, 1980. – 693 с. – (Советская военная энциклопедия : [в 8 т.]; 1976–1980, т. 7).
