= Johannes Raudmets =

Estonian military personnel

- Born: January 1, 1892; Virika, Governorate of Estonia, Russian Empire
- Died: September 9, 1937 (aged 45) Soviet Union
- Allegiance: Russian Empire; Soviet Union
- Branch: Imperial Russian Army; Soviet Red Army
- Rank: Komdiv
- Commands: 15th Rifle Division
- Conflicts: World War I Russian Civil War

Johannes Raudmets (Russian: Ива́н Ива́нович Ра́удмец, romanized: Ivan Ivanovich Raudmets; January 1, 1892 – September 9, 1937) was an Estonian Soviet Komdiv (division commander). He fought in the Imperial Russian Army in World War I before going over to the Bolsheviks in the subsequent civil war. He was a recipient of the Order of the Red Banner. During the Great Purge, he was arrested on June 11, 1937 and later executed. Some sources give the date of his execution as August 25, 1937. After the death of Joseph Stalin, he was rehabilitated in 1966.

== Bibliography ==
- Гражданская война и военная интервенция в СССР. Энциклопедический справочник, - М., "Советская энциклопедия", 1983.
- Великий Жовтень i громадянська вiйна на Україні. - К., Головна редакція УРЕ, 1987.
- Энциклопедический словарь «Николаевцы, 1789-1999 г.г.», г.Николаев, «Возможности Киммерии», 1999.
- Cherushev, Nikolai Semyonovich; Cherushev, Yury Nikolaevich (2012). Расстрелянная элита РККА (командармы 1-го и 2-го рангов, комкоры, комдивы и им равные): 1937—1941. Биографический словарь [Executed Elite of the Red Army (Komandarms of the 1st and 2nd ranks, Komkors, Komdivs, and equivalents) 1937–1941 Biographical Dictionary] (in Russian). Moscow: Kuchkovo Pole. ISBN 9785995002178.

Preceded by Pyotr Solodukhin	Commander of the 15th Rifle Division; August 1920 – October 1921	Succeeded by Marcian Germanovich
