= 15th Rifle Division (Soviet Union) =

15th Rifle Division 15th Motorized Rifle Division
- Active: 1919–1992
- Country: Soviet Union
- Branch: Red Army
- Type: Infantry
- Size: Division
- Engagements: Russian Civil War; World War II; Operation München; Battle of Uman; First Battle of Voronezh; Liberation of Voronezh; Battle of Kursk; East Pomeranian Offensive; Battle of Berlin
- Decorations: Order of Lenin; Order of the Red Banner (2); Order of Suvorov
- Battle honours: Sivash; Stettin

Commanders
- Notable commanders: Semyon Krivoshein; Vladimir Janjgava; Kuzma Grebennik

The 15th Rifle Division (Russian: 15-я стрелковая дивизия) was a military formation of the Red Army formed by renaming the Red Army's Inza Revolutionary Division on 30 April 1919. The division was active during the Russian Civil War and World War II.

The 15th Rifle Division was awarded the Order of Lenin, two Orders of the Red Banner, the Order of Suvorov, and the Red Banner of Labour of the Ukrainian SSR, ultimately receiving the honorific designation 15th Sivash-Stettin Order of Lenin, Twice Order of the Red Banner, Order of Suvorov, Order of the Red Banner of Labour Division (15-я стрелковая Сивашско-Штеттинская, ордена Ленина, дважды Краснознамённая, орденов Суворова, Трудового Красного Знамени дивизия).

== Establishment and World War II ==
The 15th Rifle Division was formed by renaming the Red Army's Inza Revolutionary Division on 30 April 1919. In November 1920, the division crossed the Sivash into Crimea and fought against the White Army commanded by Pyotr Wrangel. Units from the disbanded 31st Turkestan Rifle Division joined the division on 2 December 1920.

On 29 February 1928, in honor of the tenth anniversary of the Red Army, the division was awarded the Honorary Revolutionary Red Banner.

On 10 January 1936, in honor of the fifteenth anniversary of the Sivash battles, the division was awarded the Order of Lenin.

It was renamed as the 15th Motorized Division in September 1939 and took part in the Red Army's march into Romanian-ceded Bessarabia in 1940. On 22 June 1941, the division was stationed in Bender and Tiraspol as part of the 2nd Mechanized Corps, 9th Army, Odessa Military District.

Its first battle after the start of Operation Barbarossa occurred in the Skulyan raion (part of Kalarash) on 24 June 1941, after which it pulled back and departed for the Dniester. In July 1941, the 15th Motorized Rifle Division was caught in the encirclement around Uman, and was largely destroyed. Rkkaww2 states that 'The entire headquarters of the 15th Motorised Division was captured. However, later, the divisional commander, Colonel Laskin, managed to escape from captivity.'

Its name was reverted to 15th Rifle Division, with the 676th Mountain Rifle Regiment of the 192nd Mountain Rifle Division added as its third regiment. The division's commander during the Uman encirclement, Major-General Nikolay Nikanorovich Belov was killed on 9 August 1941. Some of its members escaped from the encirclement by the end of September 1941. It remained on the Southern Front and took part in defending the Donbas in the area near Artemovsk until being transferred to the Bryansk Front's 13th Army in May 1942.

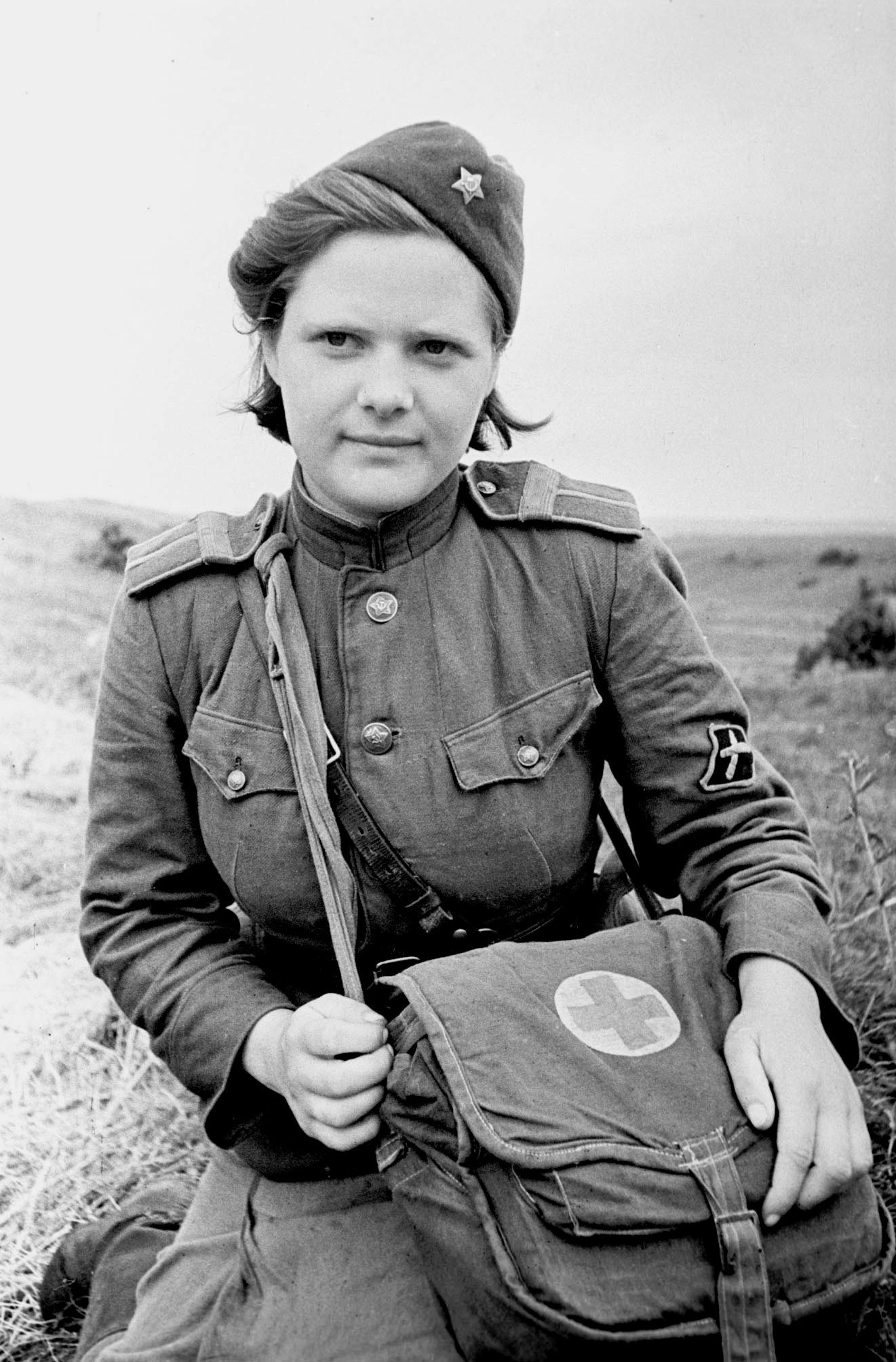
Sanitary instructor Starshina Anna Sokolova of the 676th Regiment's anti-tank gun battery during the Battle of Kursk, July 1943. Sokolov was killed in action on 7 August, just weeks after this photograph was taken.

The 15th Rifle Division took part in the defensive battle at Voronezh in the summer of 1942 and in the subsequent battle to liberate the city in 1943. On the night of 5 July 1943, reconnaissance units of the division captured a prisoner who showed that the German troops would launch an attack on Kursk during the same day, and the division fought in the Battle of Kursk.

Its subsequent operations included the Chernigov-Pripyat and Gomel-Rechitsa Offensives in 1943, the Kalinkovichi-Mozyr Operation, Operation Bagration and the liberation of Baranovichi in 1944, the Mława-Elbing Operation, the East Pomeranian Offensive, and the Battle of Berlin in 1945.

=== Composition ===
As the 15th Rifle Division (in June 1941):

- 47th Motor Rifle Regiment
- 321st Rifle Regiment
- 14th Tank Regiment
- 203rd Artillery Regiment
- 166th Separate Anti-Tank Battalion
- 114th Separate Anti-Aircraft Battalion
- 77th Reconnaissance Battalion
- 75th Light Engineering Battalion
- 53rd Separate Signals Battalion
- 96th Medical Battalion
- 156th Auto-Transport Battalion
- 35th Repairing Battalion
- 38th Traffic Control Company
- 61st Field Bakery
- 77th Field Post Station
- 357th Field Bank Department

As the 15th Rifle Division (renamed on 6 August 1941):

- 47th Rifle Regiment
- 321st Rifle Regiment
- 676th Rifle Regiment
- 203rd Howitzer Regiment (until 04.11.1941)
- 203rd Artillery Regiment (from 21.04.1942)
- 81st Howitzer Regiment (from 16.11.1941 to 15.01.1942)
- 166th Separate Anti-Tank Battalion
- 425th Anti-Aircraft Battery (114th Separate Anti-Aircraft Battalion) (until 29.04.1943)
- 77th Reconnaissance Company
- 5th Ski Battalion (from 05.11.1943 to 30.04.1944)
- 75th Sapper Battalion
- 527th Separate Signals Battalion (182nd Separate Signals Company)
- 96th Medical Battalion
- 79th Separate Chemical Defense Company
- 43rd Auto-Transport Company
- 324th Field Bakery (61st Field Mobile Baking Factory)
- 170th Divisional Veterinary Hospital
- 77th Field Post Station
- 357th Field Bank Department

=== Commanders ===
Before and during World War II:

- Yan Latsis (30 June 1918 – 14 November 1919)
- Alexander Sirotkin (14–29 November 1919)
- Mikhail Sangursky (29 November 1919 – 18 February 1920)
- Alexander Sedyakin (18 February – 19 June 1920)
- Eduard Lepin (19 June – 22 July 1920)
- Pyotr Solodukhin (22 July – 3 August 1920; KIA)
- Johannes Raudmets (3 August 1920 – 18 October 1921)
- Marcian Germanovich (1922–1924)
- Vladimir Tarasenko (1935)
- Kombrig Dmitry Ivanovich Gudkov (11 January 1936 – 8 June 1937)
- Kombrig Yakov Ishchenko (8 June 1937 – 27 February 1938)
- Kombrig Semyon Krivoshein (9 May – 4 June 1940)
- Kombrig Mikhail Solomatin (4 June 1940 – 11 March 1941)
- Major-General Nikolay Nikanorovich Belov: 11.03.1941 – 09.08.1941, killed in action
- Colonel Afanasy Nikitovich Slyshkin (major-general from 1.10.1942): 04.09.1941 – 25.06.1942
- Colonel Vladimir Nikolayevich Janjgava: 26.06.1943 – 14.07.1943
- Colonel Vasily Ivanovich Bulgakov: 15.07.1943 – 07.08.1943
- Colonel Kuzma Yedvokimovich Grebennik (major-general from 03.06.1944): 08.08.1943 – 28.03.1945
- Colonel Andrey Petrovich Varyukhin: 29.03.1945 – 09.05.1945

== Postwar ==
After the Second World War the division briefly became the 26th Mechanised Division in 1945, then in 1957 the 100th Motor Rifle Division. In 1965 it regained its Second World War number and became the 15th Motor Rifle Division. Through much of the postwar period it was part of 7th Guards Army in the Transcaucasus Military District. During this period it was stationed at Kirovakan. The division was maintained at 20% strength during the Cold War. In June 1992, it was disbanded and much of its equipment was taken over by Armenia. The divisional banner was given to the 5209th Weapons and Equipment Storage Base (BHVT), formed from the disbanded 91st Motor Rifle Division in Nizhneudinsk. The 5209th BHVT was renamed the 6063rd BHVT. In June 2009, the 6063rd BHVT became the 187th Weapons and Equipment Storage Repair Base (BHiRVT).

The 15th Motor Rifle Division included the following units in 1988:

- 343rd Motorized Rifle Regiment (Kirovakan, Armenian SSR)
- 348th Motorized Rifle Regiment (Dilizhan, Armenian SSR)
- 353rd Motorized Rifle Regiment (Kirovakan, Armenian SSR)
- 132nd Guards Tank Regiment (Kirovakan, Armenian SSR)
- 1068th Artillery Regiment (Kirovakan, Armenian SSR)
- 1029th Antiaircraft Artillery Regiment(Kirovakan, Armenian SSR)
- 692nd Separate Missile Battalion (Kirovakan, Armenian SSR)
- 767th Separate Reconnaissance Battalion(Kirovakan, Armenian SSR)
- 324th Separate Engineer-Sapper Battalion(Kirovakan, Armenian SSR)
- 527th Separate Communications Battalion (Kirovakan, Armenian SSR)
- 621st Separate Chemical Defense Battalion (Dilizhan, Armenian SSR)
- 169th independent Equipment Maintenance and Recovery Battalion (Kirovakan, Armenian SSR)
- ?th Separate Medical Battalion (Kirovakan, Armenian SSR)
- 1542nd Separate Material Supply Battalion (Kirovakan, Armenian SSR)
