= Sergei Gribov (footballer, born 1969) =

Russian footballer (born 1969)

Personal information
- Full name: Sergei Mikhailovich Gribov
- Date of birth: 17 May 1969 (age 57)
- Height: 1.80 m (5 ft 11 in)
- Positions: Defender; midfielder

Youth career
- FC Stal Cheboksary

Senior career*
Years	Team	Apps	(Gls)
1987–1988	FC Stal Cheboksary	16	(2)
1989	ShVSM-SKA Kuybyshev	15	(0)
1989–1997	FC Krylia Sovetov Samara	175	(0)
1998	FC Nosta Novotroitsk	6	(0)
- * Club domestic league appearances and goals

Sergei Mikhailovich Gribov (Russian: Серге́й Михайлович Грибов; born 17 May 1969) is a former Russian professional footballer.

== Club career ==
He made his professional debut in the Soviet Second League in 1987 for FC Stal Cheboksary.
