= Marcian Germanovich =

Soviet military commander

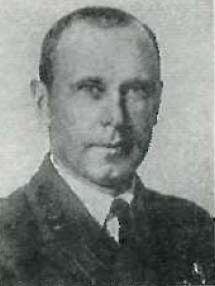
- Born: October 29, 1895; Russian Empire
- Died: September 20, 1937 (aged 41) Soviet Union
- Allegiance: Russian Empire; Soviet Union
- Branch: Imperial Russian Army; Soviet Red Army
- Rank: Komkor
- Commands: 15th Rifle Division
- Conflicts: World War I Russian Civil War

Marcian Yakovlevich Germanovich (Russian: Маркиан Яковлевич Германович; October 29, 1895 – September 20, 1937) was a Soviet division commander and Komkor (corps commander). He fought in the Imperial Russian Army in World War I before going over to the Bolsheviks in the subsequent Civil War. He was a recipient of the Order of the Red Banner. During the Great Purge, he was arrested on August 7, 1937, and later executed. After the death of Joseph Stalin, he was rehabilitated in 1957.

Preceded by Johannes Raudmets	Commander of the 15th Rifle Division; 1922–1924	Succeeded by Vladimir Tarasenko

== Bibliography ==
- Краснознамённый Киевский. Очерки истории Краснознамённого Киевского военного округа (1919–1979). Издание второе, исправленное и дополненное. Киев, издательство политической литературы Украины, 1979.[Red Banner Kiev. Essays on the History of the Red Banner Kyiv Military District (1919–1979). Second edition, revised and supplemented. Kyiv, Publishing House of Political Literature of Ukraine, 1979.]
- Военный энциклопедический словарь. М., Военное издательство, 1984. С.763-УкрВО;с.838-ЮЗВО. [Military Encyclopedic Dictionary. Moscow, Military Publishing House, 1984. P.763-UkrVO; p.838-SWVO.]
- Григорян А. М., Мильбах В. С., Чернавский А. Н. [in Russian] (2013). Политические репрессии командно-начальствующего состава, 1937—1938 гг. Ленинградский военный округ. СПб.: Издательство Санкт-Петербургского университета. p. 68. ISBN 978-5-288-05282-8. [Grigoryan, Ararat Mamikonovich, Milbakh, Vladimir Spartakovich, Chernavsky, Aleksandr Nikolaevich, Political repressions of the command staff, 1937-1938 Leningrad Military District (St. Petersburg University Press, 2013) p.68]
- Черушев Н. С.; Черушев Ю. Н. (2012), Расстрелянная элита РККА (командармы 1-го и 2-го рангов, комкоры, комдивы и им равные): 1937—1941. Биографический словарь [Shot elite of the Red Army (commanders of the 1st and 2nd ranks, comkors, divisional commanders and their equal): 1937-1941. Biographical Dictionary], Moscow: Kuchkovo field; Metropolis [Кучково поле; Мегаполис], pp. 69–70, ISBN 978-5-9950-0217-8
