= Sergei Gribov (military officer) =

Soviet komkor (corps commander)

Sergei Efimovich Gribov
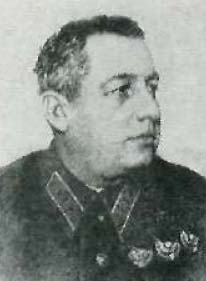
- Born: 17 July 1895; Russian Empire
- Died: 29 July 1938 (aged 43); Soviet Union
- Allegiance: Russian Empire; Soviet Union
- Branch: Imperial Russian Army; Soviet Red Army
- Rank: Komkor
- Commands: North Caucasus Military District
- Battles / wars: World War I Russian Civil War

Sergei Efimovich Gribov (Russian: Сергей Ефимович Грибов; 17 July 1895 – 29 July 1938) was a Soviet komkor (corps commander). He fought in the Imperial Russian Army during World War I before going over to the Bolsheviks during the subsequent civil war. He was a recipient of the Order of the Red Banner. He commanded forces in the North Caucasus region. During the Great Purge, he was arrested on 28 January 1938 and later executed. After the death of Joseph Stalin, he was rehabilitated in 1956.

Preceded by Nikolai Kashirin	Commander of the North Caucasus Military District; 1937–1938	Succeeded by Mikhail Grigoryevich Yefremov

== Bibliography ==
- Cherushev, Nikolai Semyonovich; Cherushev, Yury Nikolaevich (2012). Расстрелянная элита РККА (командармы 1-го и 2-го рангов, комкоры, комдивы и им равные): 1937—1941. Биографический словарь [Executed Elite of the Red Army (Komandarms of the 1st and 2nd ranks, Komkors, Komdivs, and equivalents) 1937–1941 Biographical Dictionary] (in Russian). Moscow: Kuchkovo Pole. ISBN 9785995002178.
- Селиванов П. А. Комкор Сергей Грибов. Минск, 1972.
- Советская военная энциклопедия в 8-ми томах, том 3.

== Sources ==
- Composition of the Military Council of the People's Commissariat of Defense of the USSR (February 1936)
- Biographies at hrono.ru
- Repression in the Red Army
