= To the Valiant Soldier of the Karelian Front =

The memorial award badge "To the Valiant Soldier of the Karelian Front"
- Presented by: USSR
- Eligibility: Citizens of the Soviet Union
- Status: No longer awarded
- Established: March 5, 1922
- First award: 1922

The memorial award badge To the Valiant Soldier of the Karelian Front (Russian: наградной памятный знак (жетон) "Честному воину Карельского фронта") was a military decoration introduced in the Red Army. It was the first award of this type.

"Karelian Front" was an informal name of the Karelian Battle Region of the Petrograd Military District in the territory of Karelia and part of Murmansk guberniya, formed for the suppression of the Karelian Uprising of 1921–1922.

The award was established by the RSFSR Revolutionary Military Council on March 5, 1922 on the occasion of the suppression of the Karelian Uprising. All participants "of the liquidation of the intervention of White-Finnish bands into the territory of Karelia" received this award.
