= Nikolay Belov (general) =

Soviet general (1896–1941)

Nikolay Nikanorovich Belov
- Born: 6 December 1896; Kursk, Kursk Governorate; Russian Empire
- Died: 9 August 1941 (aged 44) near Podvysokoye, Kirovograd Oblast; Ukrainian SSR; Soviet Union
- Military career
- Allegiance: Russian Empire; Soviet Union
- Branch: Imperial Russian Army; Red Army
- Service years: 1915 – 1941
- Rank: Major-general
- Commands: 9th Cavalry Division; 15th Motorized Rifle Division / 15th Rifle Division
- Conflicts: World War I Russian Civil War; World War II †

Nikolay Nikanorovich Belov (Russian: Никола́й Никано́рович Бело́в; 6 December 1896 – 9 August 1941) was a Red Army World War II major-general who commanded the 15th Motorized Rifle Division / 15th Rifle Division.

Belov was wounded during the German invasion of the Soviet Union on 4 August 1941, but chose to remain with his men rather than escape the battle by aircraft.

He was killed by a German shell fragment on 9 August 1941.

== Biography ==
Born to a poor working family in Kursk in 1896, Belov was conscripted into the Imperial Russian Army in August 1915 and saw action on the Eastern Front of World War I. He joined the newly formed Red Army after the October Revolution, fought in the Russian Civil War, and became a member of the Bolshevik Party in 1919.

A cavalry commander in the 1930s, he led the 9th Cavalry Division during the Soviet campaign into Polish western Ukraine in 1939 and into Romanian-ceded Bessarabia in 1940.

Belov became a major-general in June 1940 and was assigned to command the mechanized 15th Motorized Rifle Division of the 2nd Mechanized Corps in March 1941.

Badly mauled in July 1941 by the advancing Germans after their surprise attack on the Soviet Union, Belov's 15th Motorized Rifle Division was reorganized on 6 August as the 15th Rifle Division.

Belov was wounded on 4 August 1941. An airplane was dispatched to evacuate him, but Belov chose to remain with his men in the German encirclement. He was killed in combat by a German shell fragment near the village of Podvysokoye in the Kirovograd Oblast of the Ukrainian Soviet Socialist Republic on 9 August 1941.
