= Istra, Istrinsky District, Moscow Oblast =

Town in Moscow Oblast, Russia

Istra Истра
- Town
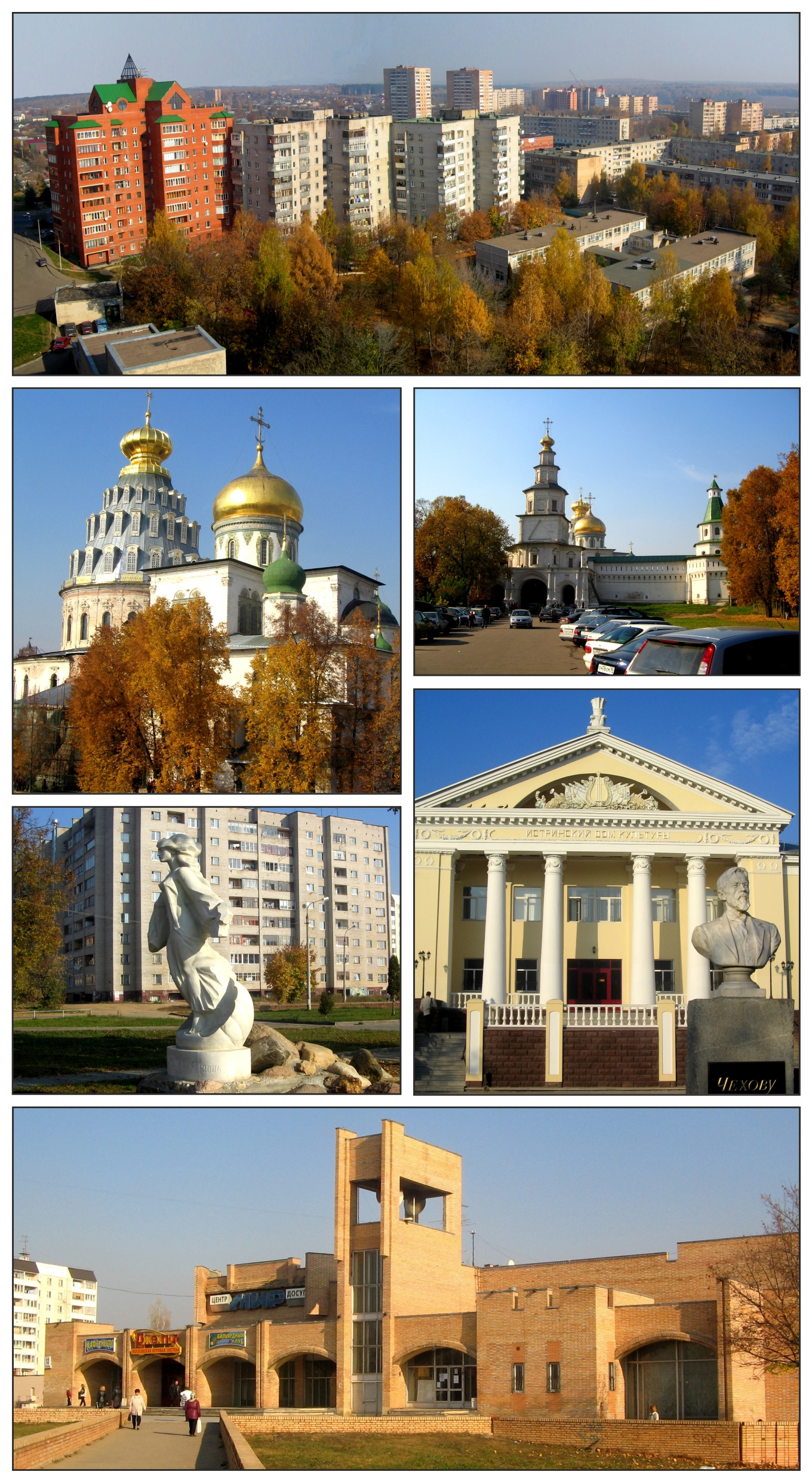
- Views of Istra

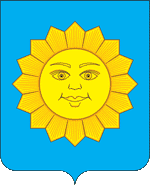
- Flag Coat of arms
- Interactive map of Istra
- Location of Istra Istra (Moscow Oblast)
- Coordinates: 55°55′N 36°52′E
- Country: Russia
- Federal subject: Moscow Oblast
- Administrative district: Istrinsky District
- TownSelsoviet: Istra
- Known since: 16th century
- Town status since: 1781

Government
  - Head: Yury Savelyev
- Elevation: 165 m (541 ft)

Population (2010 Census)
  - Total: 35,111
  - Estimate (2025): 34,552 (−1.6%)

Administrative status
  - Capital of: Istrinsky District, Town of Istra

Municipal status
  - Municipal district: Istrinsky Municipal District
  - Urban settlement: Istra Urban Settlement
  - Capital of: Istrinsky Municipal District, Istra Urban Settlement
- Time zone: UTC+3 (MSK)
- Postal codes: 143500–143502, 143508
- Dialing code: +7 49631
- OKTMO ID: 46533000001
- Website: гп-истра.рф

Istra (Russian: И́стра) is a town and the administrative center of Istrinsky District in Moscow Oblast, Russia, located on the Istra River, 40 kilometers (25 mi) west of Moscow, on the Moscow–Riga railway. Population: 35,111 (2010 census); 33,652 (2002 census); 35,046 (1989 Soviet census). It was previously known as Voskresenskoye, Voskresensk (until 1930).

== History ==
Known since the 16th century as the village of Voskresenskoye, it was acquired by Patriarch Nikon to serve the needs of the neighbouring Voskresensky (Resurrection) Monastery. By 1781, the village had grown into the town of Voskresensk and become the seat of an uyezd.

In 1930, the town was renamed Istra (after the river which flows through it) in order to avoid the old name's religious connotations. As a result of short-term occupation during the Great Patriotic War (from November 25 to December 11, 1941), the town was severely damaged. After the war, Istra became a center of research in the area of electrical power engineering.

== Administrative and municipal status ==
Within the framework of administrative divisions, Istra serves as the administrative center of Istrinsky District. As an administrative division, it is, together with two rural localities, incorporated within Istrinsky District as the Town of Istra. As a municipal division, the Town of Istra is incorporated within Istrinsky Municipal District as Istra Urban Settlement.

== Science ==
There is a large high voltage research center near Istra at 55°55′26″N 36°49′10″E.

== Education ==
There are 4 secondary schools in Istra:

#1 after A. P. Chekhov, founded in 1908

#2 after N.K. Krupskaya, reconstructed in 2008

#3 after M.Y. Lermontov

#4 Liceum

Other educational institutions in Istra:

- Musical School

- School of Arts

- Pedagogical College.

== Architecture ==
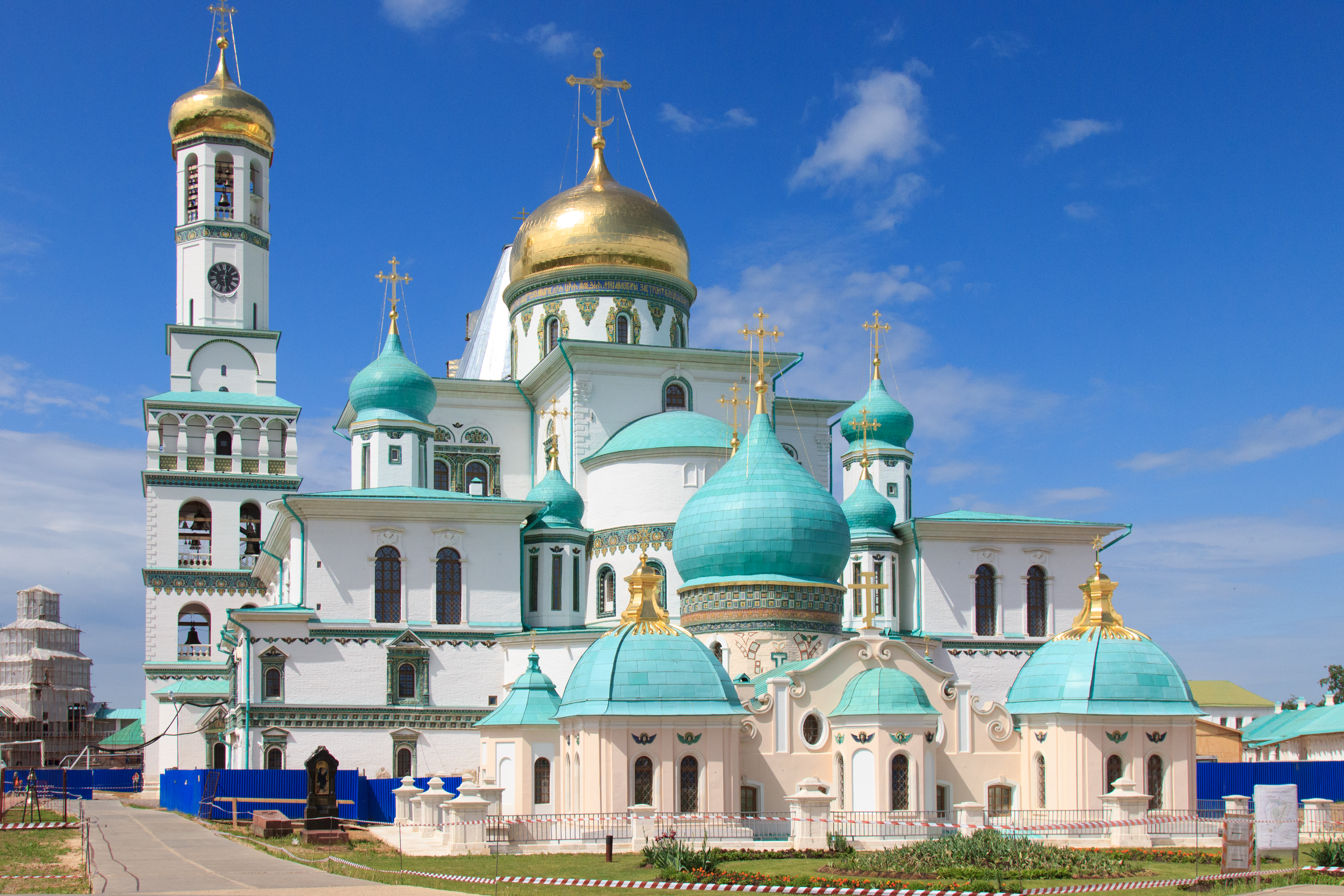
New Jerusalem Monastery

New Jerusalem Monastery, also known as the Voskresensky Monastery, is located in Istra.

== Notable people ==
Famous Russian short-story writer and playwright Anton Chekhov used to work in Istra and its outskirts, while his brother Ivan Chekhov was a teacher at a local school. Soviet geographer Alexander Kruber was born in Istra.

== Twin towns – sister cities ==
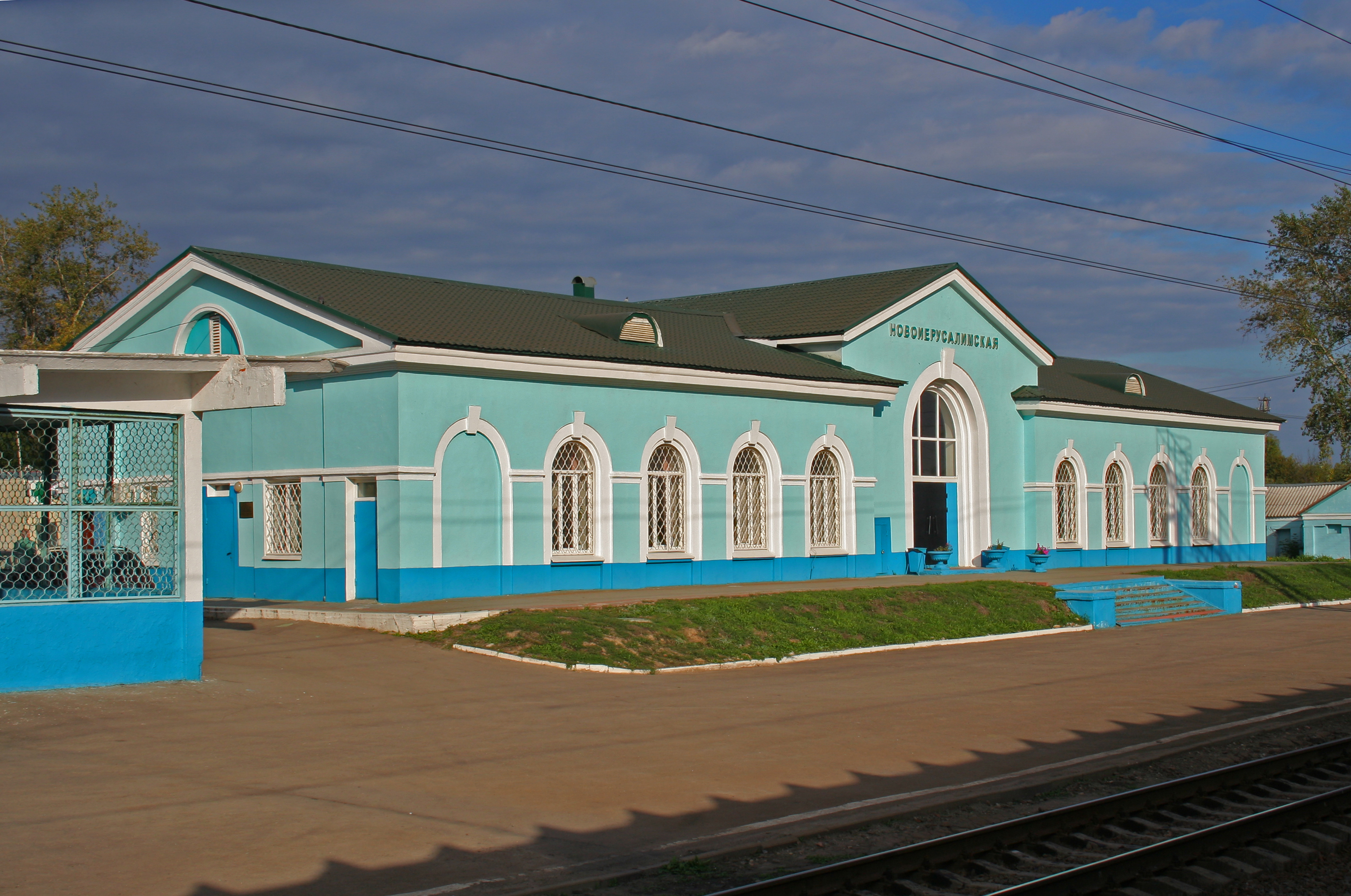
Novoiyerusalimskaya railway station in Istra

Istra is twinned with:

- Bad Orb, Germany
- Bečej, Serbia
- Dyurtyuli, Russia
- Łobez, Poland
- Loreto, Italy
- Petrich, Bulgaria
- Pinsk, Belarus
- Rakovník, Czech Republic
