= Istra (Moskva) =

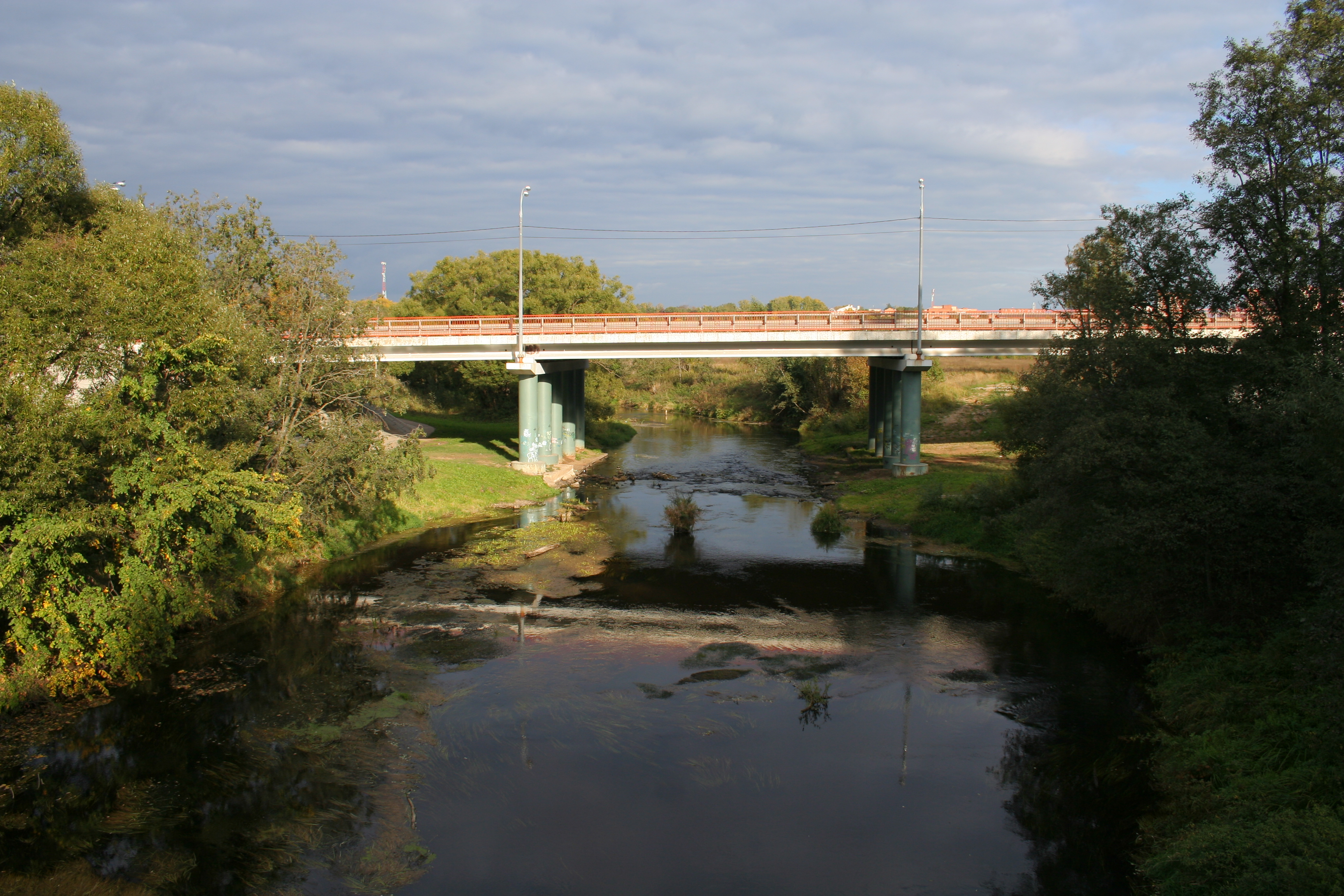
- Istra River in Istra

Location
- Country: Russia

Physical characteristics
- Source
  - location: Moscow Oblast
- Mouth: Moskva
  - coordinates: 55°44′30″N 37°08′26″E
- Length: 113 km (70 mi)
- Basin size: 2,050 km^{2} (790 sq mi)
- Discharge
  - average: 11.3 m^{3}/s (400 cu ft/s)

Basin features
- Progression: Moskva→ Oka→ Volga→ Caspian Sea

Istra (Russian: И́стра) is a river in Moscow Oblast, Russia. It is a left tributary of the Moskva. It is 113 kilometres (70 mi) long, and has a drainage basin of 2,050 square kilometres (790 sq mi). The town of Istra is located on it.
