= Death dates of victims of the Great Purge =

Joseph Stalin's purges and massacres between 1936 and the invasion of the Soviet Union by Nazi Germany (Great Purge) had about one million victims. This list includes some of the most prominent victims along with the date of their deaths. Except where otherwise stated, the date is that on which the individual was executed by shooting.

== 1936 ==
July

9 Aghasi Khanjian (murdered by Lavrentiy Beria or suicide)

August

22 Mikhail Tomsky (suicide)

25 Grigori Zinoviev, Lev Kamenev, Grigori Yevdokimov, Ivan Bakayev, Sergei Mrachkovsky, Ivan Smirnov, Vagarshak Ter-Vaganyan.

September

25 (Genrikh Yagoda dismissed from his post as head of the NKVD, and replaced by Nikolai Yezhov)

October

3 Platon Volkov

November

23 Boris Pinson

December

28 Nestor Lakoba (suspected poisoning)

== 1937 ==
January

10 Martemyan Ryutin, Ivar Smilga, Pyotr Zalutsky

February

1 Georgy Pyatakov, Mikhail Boguslavsky, Yakov Drobnis, Nikolai Muralov, Leonid Serebryakov.

18 Sergo Ordzhonikidze (possibly suicide)

March

8 Izrail Agol

13 Nikolai Glebov-Avilov

21 Levan Gogoberidze

22 Andrei Kolegayev

May

26 Vladimir Nevsky, Alexander Slepkov, Vladimir Smirnov

31 Yan Gamarnik (suicide), Nikolai Uglanov

June

12 Mikhail Tukhachevsky, Roberts Eidemanis, Boris Feldman, August Kork, Vitaly Primakov, Vitovt Putna, Ieronim Uborevich, Iona Yakir.

14 Voldemar Vöölmann

17 Max Levien

19 Yakov Doletsky (suicide), Dmitry Shmidt

20 Mark Gai, Andreu Nin (murdered in Barcelona), Jan Sten

27 Sandro Akhmeteli

July

1 Anatoliy Gekker, Matvei Vasilenko

2 Yevgeni Preobrazhensky, Lev Sosnovsky

3 Boris Gorbachyov

7 Axel Bakunts

10 George Eliava

16 Vladimir Kirillov, Pavel Vasiliev

18 Grigol Giorgadze

19 Budu Mdivani

22 Paolo Iashvili (suicide)

August

4 Shalva Okudzhava^{ru}

7 Oscar Ryvkin, Nikolai Sollogub

13 Aleksandr Voronsky, Boris Didkovsky

14 Leopold Averbakh, Karl Pauker, Ivan Zaporozhets, Leonty Ugryumov

17 Sahak Ter-Gabrielyan

19 Ivan Kataev

21 Artur Artuzov, Adolf Warski, Leon Gaikis

25 Johannes Raudmets, Boris Steiger^{ru}

27 Igor Akulov

30 Panas Lyubchenko (suicide)

September

2 Grigol Lordkipanidze (died while under interrogation), Alexander Shliapnikov

4 Ignace Reiss (murdered in Switzerland), Evgeny Pashukanis

10 Sergei Medvedev, Hayk Ovsepyan, David Petrovsky, Sergei Syrtsov, Sergei Tretyakov

14 Nikolay Ustryalov

20 Dimitri Vardanashvili, Lev Karakhan, Marcian Germanovich, Nikolai Kashirin, Ivan Smolin, Ivan Teodorovich, Henryk Walecki

21 Seit Devdariani, Julian Lenski

28 Sergei Mezheninov, Timofei Sapronov

30 Mikheil Javakhishvili

October

3 Alexander Chayanov, Hans Kippenberger, Willy Leow

4 Vladimir Volsky

6 Alexey Skulachenko

10 Peter of Krutitsy

13 Bekir Çoban-zade, Ahmad Javad

14 Karl Bauman

15 Dmitry Fesenko, Evgen Gvaladze, Pamphylia Tanailidi

23 Nikolai Klyuev

26 Henryk Domski

27 Nikolai Durnovo

29 Yakau Branshteyn, Anani Dziakaŭ, Platon Halavach, Valery Marakou, Anatol Volny, Vladimir Milyutin, Sergei Sedov

30 Ivan Akulov, Mikhail Chudov, Mendel Khatayevich, Aleksei Kiselyov, Alexander Krinitsky, Vladimir Polonsky, Mikhail Razumov, Alexander Shotman, Avel Yenukidze, Ivan Zhukov

November

1 Kuzebay Gerd, Milan Gorkic, Gustaw Henrykowski

4 Alexandru Dobrogeanu-Gherea

8 Mikhail Vasilyev-Yuzhin

10 Lev Shubnikov

11 Sergei Chavain, Olyk Ipai, Shabdar Osyp

15 Gleb Bokii

19 Mikhail Demichev

20 Metropolitan Joseph (Petrovykh)

21 Fyodor Golovin, Adrian Piotrovsky

24 Nikolay Oleynikov

26 Yakov Hanecki, Heinz Neumann, Alexander Krasnoshchyokov, Leonid Kurchevsky, Emanuel Kviring

27 Yeghishe Charents, Aino Forsten, Eero Haapalainen, Ruben Rubenov, Daniil Sulimov

28 Rose Cohen

December

2 Petre Otskheli

3 Shalva Eliava, Boris Skibine

8 Pavel Florensky

10 Rashid Khan Kaplanov, Vladimir Lyubimov, Movses Silikyan

11 Jaan Anvelt (died from torture under interrogation), Hayk Bzhishkyan, Seraphim Chichagov, Mamia Orakhelashvili

16 Giorgi Mazniashvili, Titsian Tabidze

19 Waclaw Bogucki

20 Mustafa Mahmudov

22 Evgeni Mikeladze

23 Herman Hurmevaara

30 Alyaksandr Tsvikievich

31 James Lewin

== 1938 ==
January

2 Yevgeny Henkin, Ulvi Rajab

4 Boris Tageyev

6 Mikayil Mushfig

8 Jūlijs Daniševskis, Mikhail Plisetski

11 Arvid Kubbel, Georgy Langemak

14 Anatoly Pepelyayev

15 Anna Tieke

17 Vladimir Beneshevich

20 Juho Perala, Nikolai Zhilyayev

25 Yevgeny Polivanov

29 Anton Prykhodko

February

8 Tikhon Khvesin, Nikolai Kuzmin, John Pepper

9 Vaino Kallio, Romuald Muklevich, Gazanfar Musabekov

10 Vladimir Antonov-Ovseenko, Christophor Araratov, Alexander Beloborodov, Maksim Haretski, Grigory Kaminsky, Joseph Meerzon, Alexander Serebrovsky, Aleksandr Smirnov

11 Asser Salo

13 Alexander Samoylovich

15 Leonid Ustrugov

17 Abram Slutsky (poisoned)

18 Georgii Frederiks, Dmitry Mushketov, Julian Shchutsky

20 Boris Kornilov

21 Vladimir Dzhunkovsky

25 Sanjar Asfendiyarov

26 Jukka Ahti, Abram Markson, Tyyne Salomaa

March

10 Tobias Akselrod

14 Vasily Glagolev

15 Nikolai Bukharin, Alexei Rykov, Genrikh Yagoda, Pavel Bulanov, Mikhail Chernov, Hryhoriy Hrynko, Akmal Ikramov, Vladimir Ivanov, Nikolai Krestinsky, Pyotr Kryuchkov, Arkady Rosengolts, Vasily Sharangovich, Isaac Zelensky, Prokopy Zubarev, Valentin Trifonov.

21 Mirza Davud Huseynov

22 Willi Budich, Hermann Schubert

28 Vladimir Timiryov

April

5 Verner Lehtimäki

7 Artyom Vesyoly

8 Panteleimon Romanov

21 Sultan Majid Afandiyev, Oskari Ikonen, Boris Pilnyak, Huseyn Rahmanov, Kustaa Rovio, Suren Shadunts

23 Kasyan Chaykovsky (died under interrogation)

24 Aliheydar Garayev

25 Jekabs Peterss, Ivan Mezhlauk

29 Aleksandra Sokolovskaya

May

8 Frans Myyryläinen

29 Hans Hellmann, Solomon Levit

June

3 Sándor Barta

5 Yakov Sheko

14 Edvard Gylling

18 Avetis Sultan-Zade

19 Anastasia Bitsenko

20 Vladimir Gorev, Nikolai Janson

21 Nikolai Goloded (suicide during an interrogation)

25 Vladimir Gorev

29 Vasily Shorin

July

10 Gaziz Almukhametov

18 Vahan Totovents

27 Mikhail Velikanov

28 Yakov Davydov, Terenty Deribas, Vladimir Kirshon, Yakov Alksnis, Izrail Leplevsky, Maksim Ammosov, Vladimir Orlov, Mikhail Sangursky, Alexander Svechin, Ioakhim Vatsetis

29 Janis Rudzutaks, Nikolai Antipov, Moisei Frumkin^{ru}, Vilhelm Knorin, Nikolai Krylenko, Valery Mezhlauk, Vasily Schmidt, Boris Shumyatsky, Matvey Skobelev, Jozef Unszlicht, Amatuni Amatuni, Yakov Yakovlev, Volodymyr Zatonsky

Ivan Belov, Yan Berzin, Anton Bulin, Ivan Dubovoy, Pavel Dybenko, Sergei Gribov, Ivan Gryaznov, Innokenty Khalepsky, Vasiliy Khripin, Grigory Kireyev, Yepifan Kovtyukh, Mikhail Levandovsky, Alexander Sedyakin, Ivan Tkachev

August

1 Yakov Agranov, Alexander Bekzadyan, Eduard Berzin, Andrei Bubnov, Aleksei Stetsky, Semyon Uritsky, Yan Gaylit, Ivan Kosogov, Nikolay Kuibyshev, Mikhail Viktorov, Konstantin Yurenev

16 Marcel Pauker

19 Nikolai Krivoruchko, Vasiliy Mantsev, Nikolay Pakhomov

22 Pyotr Feldman, Vladimir Gittis, Vilhelm Garf, Lavrenti Kartvelashvili, Pavel Sytin

25 Semyon Dimanstein

26 Andrei Sazontov, Sofia Sokolovskaya, Mikhail Svechnikov

29 Jan Antonovich Berzin, Pyotr Bryanskikh, Boris Kamkov, Béla Kun, Jamshid Nakhchivanski, Lev Mironov^{ru}, Leonid Zakovsky

September

1 Nikolai Bryukhanov, Mieczysław Broński, Valerian Osinsky

3 Alexander Tarasov-Rodionov

7 Nikolai Gorbunov, Karim Mammadbeyov, Nikolai Zimin

8 Mikhail Amelin, Ivan Nikulin

12 Gerzel Baazov

16 Vasily Yakovlev

17 Bruno Jasienski, Nikolai Kondratiev

20 Theodore Maly

21 Benedikt Livshits

22 Vladimir Karelin

27 Hanna Karhinen

October

1 Viktor Bulla

3 Vladimir Varankin

4 Nikolai Vladimirovich Nekrasov

10 Vasili Oshchepkov

11 Grigory Gurkin

12 Matti Airola (died in prison), Maximilian Kravkov

26 Alexander Nikonov

27 Khadija Gayibova, Artemic Khalatov

29 Alexander Krinitsky

30 Osip Piatnitsky

November

6 Vladimir Ivanov

9 Vasily Blyukher (beaten to death by the NKVD interrogator, Lev Shvartzman)

15 Karim Tinchurin

16 Abbas Mirza Sharifzadeh

19 Pavel Voyloshnikov

22 (Nikolai Yezhov dismissed as head of the NKVD, and replaced by Lavrentiy Beria)

29 Branislaw Tarashkyevich

December

9 Vasily Helmersen

27 Osip Mandelstam (died in a labour camp), Boris Gorev

30 Georgy Lomov

31 Artem Jijikhia

== 1939 ==
January

15 Kullervo Manner (died in a labour camp)

February

8 Mikhail Batorsky

10 Bela Szekely

22 Boris Berman, Grigory Khakhanyan

23 Alexander Kosarev, Alexander Yegorov

25 Boris Pozern, Pyotr Smorodin

26 Vlas Chubar, Stanislaw Kosior, Levon Mirzoyan, Pavel Postyshev

March

3 Lazar Kogan, Nikolay Rattel

4 Rudolf Samoylovich

7 Alexey Bakulin, Matvei Berman, Volf Bronner, Hermann Remmele

10 Georgy Bondar, Ehsanollah Khan Dustdar

15 Leo Flieg

29 Boris Tolpygo

31 Vladimir Bogushevsky

April

6 Nikolai Bekryashev (died in a labour camp)

15 Aleksei Gastev, Dmitry Shakhovskoy

16 Efrem Eshba

19 Vladimir Copic

May

8 Nikolai Varfolomeyev

19 Karl Radek (murdered in a labour camp)

21 Grigori Sokolnikov (murdered in a labour camp)

June

6 Prince Dmitri.Mirsky (died in a labour camp)

July

9 Maria Koszutska (died in prison)

August

16 Martha Ruben-Wolf (suicide)

October

31 Platon Oyunsky (died in prison)

== 1940 ==
January

26 Zinovy Ushakov

27 Isaac Babel

28 Mirsaid Sultan-Galiev, Aleksandr Uspensky

February

2 Robert Eikhe, Mikhail Koltsov, Vsevolod Meyerhold, Mikhail Trilisser, Yefim Yevdokimov

3 Mikhail Frinovsky, Nikolai Yezhov

May

7 Nikolai Vissarionovich Nekrasov

June

23 Toivo Alavirta (died in a labour camp)

August

20 Leon Trotsky (assassinated in Mexico)

October

16 Boris Stomonyakov

== 1941 ==
September

11 Maria Spiridonova, Fritz Noether, Christian Rakovsky, Varvara Yakovleva, Olga Kameneva, Garegin Apresov, Dmitry Pletnyov, Sergei Efron

== See also ==
- Timeline of the Great Purge
