= Shmidt =

Shmidt is a surname. Notable people with the surname include:

- Alexander Shmidt (1911–1987), Russian painter
- Dmitry Shmidt (1896–1937), Red Army officer
- Svitlana Shmidt (born 1990), Ukrainian middle-distance runner

== See also ==
- Shmidt Point, headland in Antarctica
- Shmidt Subglacial Basin, subglacial basin in Antarctica
