= Peter Feldman =

Peter Feldman(n) may refer to:

- Peter Feldman (poker player), American poker player
- Peter Feldman (attorney) (born 1982), American lawyer
- Peter Maximovich Feldman (1899–1938), Soviet military and naval leader
- Peter Feldmann (born 1958), mayor of Frankfurt, Germany

== See also ==
- Hans-Peter Feldmann (1941–2023), German visual artist
