= Alfred Hales (disambiguation) =

Alfred Hales (1909–1998) was a Canadian politician.

Alfred Hales may also refer to:

- Alfred Arthur Greenwood Hales (1860–1936), Australian novelist and war correspondent
- Alfred W. Hales (born 1938), American mathematician

== See also ==
- Alfie Hale (born 1939), Irish footballer
