= Sharangovich =

Sharangovich is a surname. Notable people with this surname include:

- Vasily Sharangovich (1897–1938), Soviet politician
- Yegor Sharangovich (born 1998), Belarusian professional ice hockey player
