= Demichev =

Demichev (Russian: Демичев) is a Russian masculine surname originating from the verb demit' (to cheat); its feminine counterpart is Demicheva. The surname may refer to the following notable people:

- Mikhail Demichev (1885–1937), Red Army division commander
- Pyotr Demichev (1918–2010), Soviet and Russian politician
