= Sergei Alpatov =

Russian intelligence officer

Director of the Economic Security Service of the Federal Security Service
- Incumbent
- Assumed office March 4, 2021
- Preceded by: Sergei Korolev

Personal details
- Born: Sergei Sergeevich Alpatov; September 24, 1959 (age 66) Moscow, RSFSR, Soviet Union
- Spouse: Ekaterina Yuryevna

Military service
- Allegiance: Russia
- Branch/service: KGB, FSK, FSB
- Rank: General

Sergei Sergeevich Alpatov (Russian: Сергей Сергеевич Алпатов, born September 24, 1959) is a Russian intelligence officer currently serving as acting director of the Economic Security Service (SES) of the Russian Federal Security Service (FSB).

== Early life ==
Alpatov was born in Moscow in 1959 and left almost no trace for the next fifty years. A well-known part of Alpatov's biography begins in the Department of Internal Security (CSS), one of the most influential units that monitors the rule of law within the FSB itself. According to various sources, Alpatov led either the second or third service of the CSS of the FSB, and, apparently, even then he began to quarrel with one of the most famous special services, Ivan Tkachev, who at that time headed the sixth service of the CSS.

By 2015, Alpatov, already in the rank of general, was appointed to lead the department "M" of the FSB, which oversees the Ministry of Internal Affairs, the Investigative Committee, the Prosecutor General's Office and other law enforcement agencies. the case against Colonel Zakharchenko, who was found to have almost 9 billion rubles in cash, as well as the cases of high-ranking employees of the Investigative Committee, who received more than a million dollars from the crime boss Shakro Molodoy.

"General Korolev left the chair of the head of the Economic Security Service (so far with the prefix acting) to his first deputy, Sergei Alpatov. This is perhaps even a more secretive person than Korolev, although his name is well known to anyone who follows the activities of the FSB. Alpatov is known primarily for his high-profile developments: he oversaw the case of billionaire colonel Dmitry Zakharchenko, as well as cases against high-ranking officials of the Investigative Committee who received bribes from kingpin Shakro Molodoy. However, as the Dossier Center found out, the anti-corruption fighter may not be too different from the objects of his developments. About the patrons of the general and the chic mansion in New Riga - in our new investigation".

== Leadership of Federal Penitentiary Service ==
Alpatov spent many years leading Department M of the FSB, providing "counterintelligence support" to the Ministry of Internal Affairs (MVD), the Ministry of Emergency Situations, the Ministry of Justice, and the Federal Penitentiary Service (FSIN). During this period, Alpatov took total control of FSIN, including its academy, the State Educational Institution of the Federal Penitentiary Service (CSS). He left his mark on the service, transferring more than 100 FSB officers to FSIN and recruiting more than 60% of the regional leadership of the service. Alpatov's subordinate, General Balanin, spent more than 8 years leading Department L of the FSIN, the Main Directorate for Ensuring the Activities of Operational Units, the most secret division of the service. Through his leadership, chekists from the FSB came to permeate all the penitentiary service's upper echelons.

== Personal life ==
Alpatov married Ekaterina Yuryevna, together they have a son, Ivan Sergeevich, born October 28, 1983.
