= Mark Gai =

Soviet security and police officer

Mark Isaevich Gai (Russian: Марк Исаевич Гай) (real name: Mark Isaacovich Shtoklyand; Марк Исаакович Штоклянд) (30 December 1898 – 20 June 1937) was a Soviet security and police officer, who played a major part in preparing the Great Purge, during the early stages of which he was arrested and executed.

== Career ==
Mark Gai was born in Vinnytsia, and graduated in 1918 in law from St Valentine University, Kiev. He joined the Red Guards around the time of the Bolshevik Revolution, and operated underground in Kiev during the early part of the Russian Civil War. He enlisted in the Red Army in October 1918, and was appointed chief political commissar for a rifle division in 1920. He joined the Cheka in Ukraine in May 1920, and transferred in May 1922 to Moscow, where he held a succession of posts, rising to be deputy head of the Economic Department of the OGPU in August 1931.

In June 1933, Gai succeeded Gleb Bokii as head of the Special Department of the OGPU, later the NKVD. His department was in charge of co-ordinating information on suspected spies and dissidents, particularly in the Red Army, "within which it maintained branches at every level".

In March 1936, he was appointed to a three-man commission, headed by Nikolai Yezhov, charged with investigating emigres living in the USSR. This led to the arrests of 126 members of the German Communist Party, who were accused of being 'Trotskyists' or agents of the Gestapo.

== Role in the Great Purge ==
During the preparations for the first of the Moscow Show Trials, when the former Trotskyist Ivan Smirnov was refusing to confess, Gai arranged a confrontation with the prisoner's former wife, who urged him to co-operate, not knowing that he would be executed. In July 1936, he was involved, with his assistant Zinovy Ushakov, in the arrest, interrogation and torture of Commander Dmitry Shmidt, who was forced to give incriminating testimony against Marshal Tukhachevsky and other senior officers, in what became a major purge of the Red Army.

== Downfall and death ==
In November 1936, following the dismissal of Genrikh Yagoda, head of the NKVD, Gai was one of the first department heads removed by Yagoda's successor, Nikolai Yezhov. He was appointed head of the NKVD in East Siberia. This may have been connected with Yezhov's suspicion that the former head of the special department in Omsk Yuri Makovsky was a Polish spy. In a note to Joseph Stalin, on 8 February 1936, Yezhov had complained that Makovsky was being protected by 'friends' at NKVD headquarters. Gai arrested on 1 April 1937, accused of being a spy. There is an unsubstantiated story that he escaped from the Lubyanka and reached Smolensk before being recaptured. On 20 June, he was the most senior of the first group of former NKVD officers linked to Yagoda to be shot.
