= 1st Cavalry Division (Soviet Union) =

- Active: 1922–1938
- Country: Soviet Union
- Branch: Red Army
- Type: Cavalry
- Part of: 1st Cavalry Corps
- Garrison/HQ: Proskurov
- Decorations: Order of the Red Banner
- Battle honours: Zaporizhia Red Cossack On behalf of the French Communist Party

The 1st Zaporozhye Red Cossack Cavalry Division (1st CD) was a Red Army cavalry division. It was based in Proskurov for most of its existence. Formed from the 8th Cavalry Division, it became the 32nd Cavalry Division in 1938.

== History ==
On 6 May 1922 the 8th Zaporozhye Cossack Cavalry Division of the 1st Red Cossacks Cavalry Corps became the 1st Zaporozhye Cossack Cavalry Division. The division was commanded by Mikhail Demichev, the former commander of the 8th Cavalry Division.

The division's 43rd, 44th, 45th, 46th, 47th and 48th Cavalry Regiments were respectively renamed the 1st, 2nd, 3rd, 4th, 5th and 6th Cossack Cavalry Regiments.

In 1924 the 1st Corps headquarters was at Vinnitsa. The division was divided into three brigades. The 1st Cavalry Brigade included the 1st and 2nd Cavalry Regiments, the 2nd Cavalry Brigade included the 3rd and 4th Cavalry Regiments and the 3rd Cavalry Brigade included the 5th and 6th Cavalry Regiments. On 6 September, the division headquarters was at Zhmerynka.

On 11 July 1925, the division was given the title "on behalf of the French Communist Party". On 15 December 1925, division headquarters moved to Proskurov. In 1928, French Communist politician Marcel Cachin visited the division. On 29 November 1929, the division was awarded the Order of the Red Banner. In 1930, the mechanization of cavalry began and the division added a tank squadron and an armored car squadron. In 1931, the 1st Mechanized Regiment was activated with the division.

On 15 November 1932, Kombrig Ivan Nikulin became the divisional commander after Demichev was promoted to command the 1st Cavalry Corps. In November 1936, Kombrig Mikhail Khatskilevich became the division's commander. In June 1938, the division became the 32nd Cavalry Division.
