= Seventh All-Union Congress of Soviets =

Congress held in Moscow, Russia

←	Sixth All-Union Congress of Soviets	Eighth All-Union Congress of Soviets	→
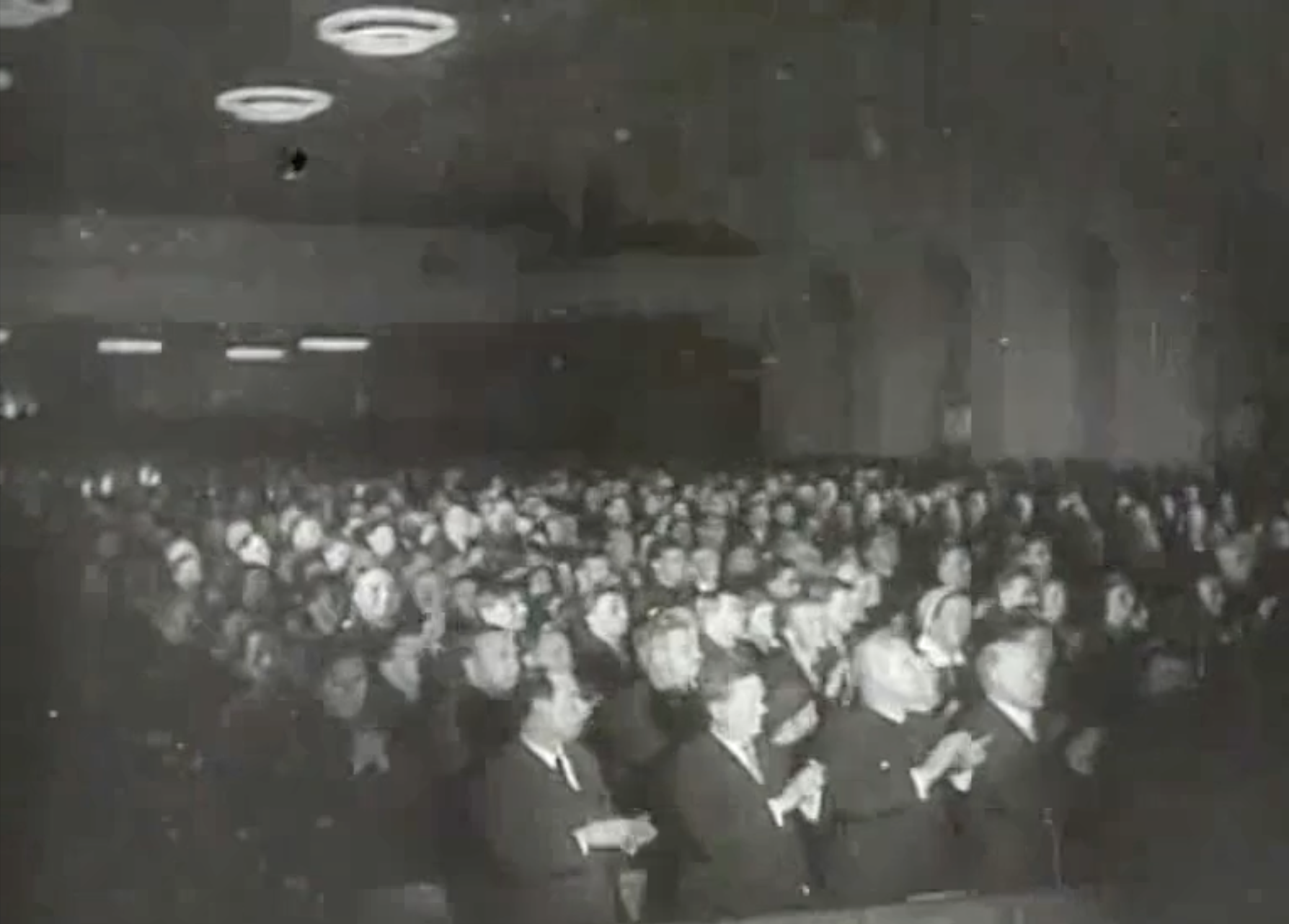
- Delegates Applauding during the Seventh All-Union Congress of Soviets

Overview
- Legislative body: Congress of Soviets of the Soviet Union
- Jurisdiction: Soviet Union
- Meeting place: Moscow, RSFSR, USSR
- Term: January 28, 1935 – February 6, 1935
- Party control: Communist Party of the Soviet Union

The Seventh All-Union Congress of Soviets was held from the 28th of January to the 6th of February, 1935, in Moscow, RSFSR, USSR. In attendance were 2,022 delegates with voting rights, consisting of 940 workers, 473 peasants, 609 Government employees, in addition to some 540 present who assumed an advisory role. Of those in attendance, 1,498 delegates were members of the Communist Party, 99 of the Komsomol and 425 were independents. During the congress, elections were held for the Central Executive Committee of the Soviet Union and a Constitutional Commission, headed by Joseph Stalin, was created in order to draft a replacement to the 1924 Constitution.

== Agenda ==
The agenda of the Seventh All-Union Congress of Soviets was as follows:

1. The Report of the Government of the Union of Soviet Socialist Republics (V.M. Molotov)
2. The Report of the People's Commissariat for Heavy Industry (G.K. Ordzhonikidze)
3. On Measures for Strengthening and Developing Livestock Farming (M.A. Chernov & M.I. Kalmanovich)
4. The Report on Constitutional Issues (A.S. Yenukidze)
5. On the Introduction of Amendments to the Constitution of the Union of Soviet Socialist Republics (V.M. Molotov)
6. Elections to the Central Executive Committee of the Union of Soviet Socialist Republics

== Proceedings ==
The report of the Government detailed progress of Socialist Construction in the Soviet Union and outlined future prospects. The Congress determined that the socialist structure had successfully superseded the old Tsarist model of economics, as well as approving the Foreign and Domestic policy approach of Stalin's government. Ordzhonikidze, in his report to the congress, noted that the successful enactment of the First Five Year Plan had allowed for the continued growth and expansion of the Soviet Union's Industrial Base, including the creation of new branches of Industry (namely aircraft manufacturing, modern machine tool manufacturing and chemical, tractor and automotive manufacturing). The Congress voted to adopt a resolution to strengthen and develop the livestock industry, including: the mechanisation of the labour process on livestock farms, the creation of new forms of "large socialist livestock farming," training and employing more livestock personnel and the qualitative improvement of veterinary and zootechnical services.

On 1 February, then Chairman of the Council of People's Commissars, Vyacheslav Molotov, prompted by the Plenum of the Central Committee of the CPSU, delivered a report to the congress "on the introduction of amendments to the constitution of the Union of Soviet Socialist Republics." The Plenary Session of the Central Committee of the All-Union Communist Party accepted the need to further democratise the outdated 1924 constitution "in line with the current balance of class forces in the USSR..." and summarily elected a 31 member constitutional commission, chaired by General-Secretary Joseph Stalin, tasked with drafting the constitution. The 1936 Constitution, also known as the Stalin constitution, was formally adopted during the 1936 Extraordinary Eighth All-Union Congress of Soviets. The Seventh All-Union Congress of Soviets closed on the 6th of February, 1935.
