= Zinovy Ushakov =

Soviet police officer and torturer

Zinovy Markovich Ushakov
- Born: 7 November 1895
- Died: 26 January 1940 (aged 44)
- Cause of death: Execution by shooting
- Occupation: Soviet police officer

Zinovy Markovich Ushakov (Russian: Зино́вий Ма́ркович Ушако́в; 7 November 1895 – 26 January 1940) was a Soviet police officer who became a notorious torturer during the Great Purge.

== Career ==
He was born in the Kiev Governorate, the son of a carpenter. Ushakov left school at age 13 to work the same trade, but was drafted into the Imperial Russian armed forces in 1916. Arrested for desertion, he escaped after spending 50 days in prison. During the Russian Civil War, he fought as a partisan in Ukraine.

He joined the Cheka in Kiev in 1920, and was based in Ukraine until 1934, when he was transferred to Saratov. From February 1935 to December 1936, he was deputy head of the Special Department of the NKVD in the Byelorussian SSR.

Ushakov was transferred to Moscow in January 1937, as assistant to the head of the special department of the NKVD, Mark Gai. He played a major role in fabricating the case against Marshal Tukhachevsky and other Red Army commanders. The first Red Army officer to be arrested in the Great Purge, Dmitry Shmidt, was interrogated by Ushakov, and forced to give evidence incriminating the commander of the Ukraine military district, Iona Yakir. After Marshal Tukhachevsky was arrested in May 1937, Ushakov took over his interrogation and forced a confession out of him – which he retracted at his trial – by beating him so severely that there were blood stains on the document he signed incriminating himself. After the arrest of Robert Eikhe in April 1938, Ushakov forced a confession out of him through torture, making use of the fact that Eikhe's broken ribs had not been mended properly.

Ushakov was sent on a mission to the Far Eastern territory in the summer of 1938 and was arrested in Khabarovsk on 5 September, when Lavrentiy Beria was taking control of the NKVD. He was sentenced to death on 21 January 1940 and shot on 26 January. Unlike many other victims of the Great Purge, he has never been 'rehabilitated'.
