= 2nd Cavalry Corps (Soviet Union) =

Soviet Red Army formation

- Active: 1st formation: 1922 – November 1941; 2nd formation: December 1941 – July 1942
- Allegiance: Soviet Union
- Branch: Soviet Red Army
- Engagements: Soviet invasion of Poland
- Battle honours: Council of People's Commissars of the Ukrainian SSR (1st formation)

Commanders
- Notable commanders: Grigory Kotovsky

The 2nd Cavalry Corps were a corps of the Red Army, formed twice. Originally formed in 1922, the corps served in Ukraine during the Interwar period and fought in the Soviet invasion of Poland. After the German invasion of Soviet Union, the 2nd Cavalry Corps fought in Ukraine and then near Moscow in November 1941. It was then renamed the 1st Guards Cavalry Corps. Recreated in December 1941, it fought in the Second Battle of Kharkov and was disbanded in July 1942.

== History ==
=== First Formation ===
The corps was formed in accordance with a 31 October 1922 directive of the Commander of the Forces of Ukraine and Crimea, the first cavalry corps headquarters formed in the Red Army after the end of the Russian Civil War. The corps was headquartered at Uman in western Ukraine, with the distinguished revolutionary Grigory Kotovsky appointed its commander. The 9th Crimea Cavalry Division at Gaisin and a newly formed cavalry division were assigned to the corps. The new cavalry division at Bershad preserved the designation of Kotovsky's Bessarabia Cavalry Brigade and was soon designated the 4th Bessarabia Cavalry Division. The 4th Cavalry Division was officially renumbered as the 3rd Cavalry Division in January 1923, and relocated to Krizhopol soon afterwards. The 1st and 2nd Cavalry Corps conducted fall cavalry maneuvers in Podolia that year and following the maneuvers the 3rd Cavalry Division was again shifted to Berdichev.

After Kotovsky was killed on 6 August 1925, he was replaced by Nikolai Krivoruchko who was promoted to Komkor in 1935 and who led the corps until July 1937. On 29 April 1927, it was named in honor of the Council of People's Commissars of the Ukrainian SSR. The 5th and 14th Cavalry Divisions joined the corps in 1930 and 1931, respectively. By the end of 1930 the corps included the 12th Kotovsky Red Banner Armored Car Battalion, equipped with BA-27 armored cars.

In 1935, the corps became part of the Kiev Military District when the Ukrainian Military District was split. In July 1937 Kombrig (later Komdiv) Mikhail Khatskilevich took command of the corps. Komdiv Fyodor Kostenko commanded the corps from April 1939 to 26 July 1940. It took part in the Soviet invasion of Poland in 1939 as part of the 6th Army. In 1940, the 9th Cavalry Division joined the corps, which had become part of the Odessa Military District. Until the beginning of Operation Barbarossa, the German invasion of the Soviet Union, on 22 June 1941, the corps were stationed in the area of Lvov and Northern Bukovina. On 14 March of that year, Major General Pavel Belov took command of the corps.

On 26 November 1941, the 2nd Cavalry Corps became the 1st Guards Cavalry Corps.

=== Second Formation ===
The corps was reformed on 23 December 1941, part of the Southern Front. It was commanded by Maj. Gen. Matvei Usenko. It included the 62nd, 64th, and the 70th Cavalry Divisions. The corps moved to the Southwestern Front, where its 64th Cavalry Division was replaced by the 38th Cavalry Division. In May 1942, it fought in the Second Battle of Kharkov as part of the 6th Army, and was almost entirely wiped out. The corps was officially disbanded on 15 July 1942.

== Commanders ==
The corps' first formation was commanded by the following officers.

- Grigory Kotovsky (30.10.1922 – 06.08.1925; killed)
- (promoted to Komkor 1935) Nikolai Krivoruchko (13.08.1925 — 07.1937)
- Mikhail Khatskilevich (6.07.1937 — 04.1939)
- Fyodor Kostenko (04.1939 — 26.07.1940)
- Fyodor Kamkov (26.07.1940 — 14.03.1941)
- Pavel Belov (14.03.1941 — 26.11.1941)

== Subordination ==
- 1922 - 1922 - The Armed Forces of Ukraine and Crimea.
- 1922-1935 - The Ukrainian Military District.
- 1935 - 1938 - The Kiev military district.
- 1938 -1940 - Cavalry Army Group, Kiev Special Military District,.
- 1940 - 1941 - Odessa military district.
- 1941-1941 - the 9th separate army.
- c 1941 - the 9th separate army of the Southern Front.

== Command structure of the corps ==
=== Military Commissioner: ( Commissar (in the military unit) ) ===
- battalion commissar Ilyin (on 07.1938).
- brigade commissar Konstantin Vasilyevich Krainyukov (since 12.04.1939, on 10.05.1939-1940).

=== Deputy corps commander ===
- brigade commissar Konstantin Vasilievich Krainyukov (since 12.04.1939, 1940-16.07.1941).

=== Military Commissioner ===
- brigade commissar Konstantin Vasilyevich Krainyukov (vrid since 12.04.1939, 16.07-25.08.1941).
- regimental commissar, brigade commissar Alexey Varfolomeevich Shchelakovsky (25.08.1941-26.11.1941).

=== Chief of staff ===
- Alexander Sergeevich Sheydeman (in 1933).
- brigade commander Sergei Ilyich Bailo (arrested September 12, 1937).
- Pavel Alekseevich Kurochkin (06-10.1939).
- Brigade Commander Pyotr Vasilievich Kotelkov (on 05-08.1940).
- Colonel Mikhail D. Gretsov (06-11.1941).

== Organization ==
- 3rd Cavalry Division
- 5th Cavalry Division
- 14th Cavalry Division
- 24th Light Tank Brigade
