= Mikhail Khatskilevich =

Soviet general

Mikhail Georgyevich Khatskilevich
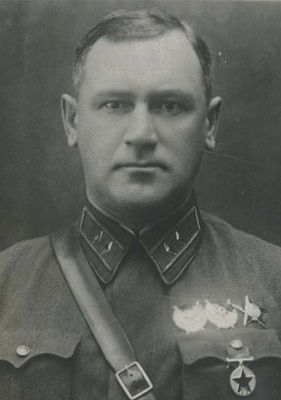
- Khatskilevich, after his 1938 promotion to Komdiv
- Born: 21 November 1895; Nizhny Novgorod, Russian Empire
- Died: 25 June 1941 (aged 45) Near Białystok, Soviet Union
- Allegiance: Russian Empire; Soviet Union
- Branch: Imperial Russian Army; Soviet Red Army
- Service years: 1916–1917 (Russian Empire); 1918–1941 (Soviet Union)
- Rank: Major general
- Commands: 1st Cavalry Division; 2nd Cavalry Corps; 6th Mechanized Corps
- Conflicts: World War I; Russian Civil War; Polish–Soviet War; World War II; Battle of Białystok–Minsk

Mikhail Georgyevich Khatskilevich (Russian: Михаил Георгиевич Хацкилевич; 21 November 1895 – 25 June 1941) was a Red Army major general. He fought in the Imperial Russian Army in World War I before going over to the Bolsheviks in the subsequent civil war. Khatskilevich commanded the 6th Mechanized Corps in Belarus at the outbreak of Operation Barbarossa, and was killed in action three days into the war during the Battle of Białystok–Minsk.

== Early life, World War I, and Russian Civil War ==
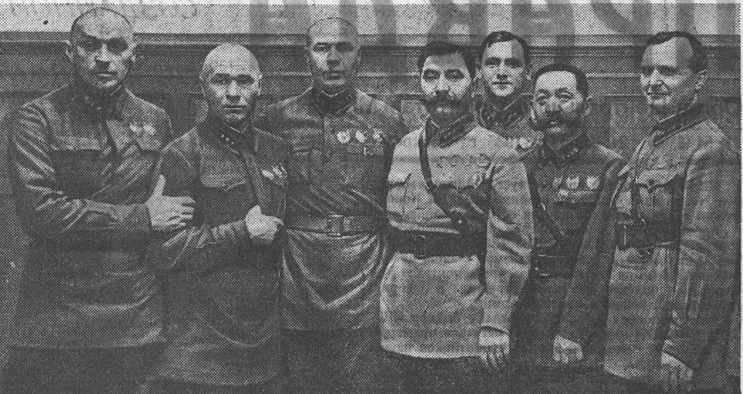
Khatskilevich (3rd from left, behind Semyon Budyonny) with a group of former senior commanders of the 1st Cavalry Army at the Seventh All-Union Congress of Soviets, 1935

Khatskilevich was born to a Jewish family on 21 November 1895 in Nizhny Novgorod. During World War I, he served in the Imperial Russian Army as a one-year volunteer between September 1916 and March 1917, becoming a clerk at the headquarters of the 10th Artillery Brigade.

Drafted into the Red Army in August 1918 during the Russian Civil War, Khatskilevich was sent to study at the 1st Tver Soviet Cavalry Courses, and after graduating from them in 1919 served with the 1st Ukrainian Special Cavalry Brigade as a squadron commander and assistant regimental commander. From August 1919 he served as regimental commander and chief of staff of the brigade as part of the 9th and 17th Cavalry Divisions of the 12th Army. From May 1920 he was assistant commander and then commander of the Consolidated Cavalry Regiment and 10th Marching Cavalry Regiment of the 12th Army and the 1st Cavalry Army. Khatskilevich fought in battles on the Southwestern, Western, and Southern Fronts. For distinguishing himself during the Polish–Soviet War in 1920 he was awarded the Order of the Red Banner twice in 1922.

== Interwar period ==
Sent to study at the Military Academy of the Red Army in late 1920, upon graduation in August 1924 Khatskilevich was appointed chief of staff of the 11th North Caucasian Territorial Cavalry Division of the North Caucasus Military District in Armavir. Transferring to serve in the same position with the 1st Special Cavalry Brigade of the Moscow Military District in October 1926, he graduated from Courses of Improvement for Higher Officers at the Frunze Military Academy in 1928. Appointed commander of the 63rd Cavalry Regiment of the brigade in November 1928, Khatskilevich became assistant inspector of the cavalry of the Red Army in February 1930.

He served as chief of the Borisoglebsk-Leningrad Combined Cavalry School from November 1931, and continued as chief when the school was relocated to Tambov in May 1932 and used to form the Combined Cavalry School. For his contributions to combat training at the school, Khatskilevich was awarded the Order of the Red Star in May 1936. He returned to unit command in November 1936 as commander and military commissar of the 1st Cavalry Division in Ukraine from November 1936, then became commander of the 2nd Cavalry Corps at Zhitomir in July 1937. Khatskilevich subsequently became chief of the Cavalry Commanders' Improvement Courses of the North Caucasus Military District before assuming command of the 6th Mechanized Corps of the Western Special Military District in Belarus in June 1940. When the Red Army introduced general officer ranks, he became a major general on 4 June.

== World War II ==
At the outbreak of Operation Barbarossa on 22 June 1941, Khatskilevich led the 6th Mechanized Corps as part of the 10th Army in the Battle of Białystok–Minsk. Between 24 and 25 June the corps counterattacked the German XX Army Corps in the sector of Białystok and Grodno, in which Khatskilevich was killed in action near Białystok on 25 June, three days into the war.

== Awards and honors ==
Khatskilevich was a recipient of the following decorations:

- Order of the Red Banner (2)
- Order of the Red Star
- Order of the Patriotic War, 1st class
- Jubilee Medal "XX Years of the Workers' and Peasants' Red Army".

Military offices
Preceded by Ivan Nikulin	Commander of the 1st Cavalry Division; November 1936 – June 1938	Succeeded by division disestablished
