= Semyon Turovsky =

Soviet corps commander (1895–1937)

- Born: 1895; Chernigove, Russian Empire
- Died: July 1, 1937 (aged 41–42)
- Military career
- Allegiance: Soviet Union
- Branch: Soviet Red Army
- Service years: 1918–1936
- Rank: Komkor
- Commands: 11th Rifle Division; 12th Rifle Corps
- Conflicts: Russian Civil War

Semyon Abramovich Turovsky (Russian, Семён Абрамович Туровский; 1895 – July 1, 1937) was a Soviet corps commander. He was born in what is now Chernihiv, Chernihiv Oblast in northern Ukraine. He fought for the Bolsheviks against the White movement during the Russian Civil War. During the Great Purge, he was denounced by Dmitry Shmidt as being a member of a Trotskyite conspiracy. He was arrested on September 4, 1936 and executed the following year. He was a recipient of the Order of the Red Banner.

Military offices
| Preceded by | Commander of the 11th Rifle Division; 1927–1928 | Succeeded by |
| Preceded by Georgy Sofronov | Commander of the 12th Rifle Corps; January 9, 1931 - February 11, 1932 | Succeeded by Ivan Tkachev |
