= Nikolai Krivoruchko =

Soviet military officer (1887–1938)

Nikolai Nikolayevich Krivoruchko
- Born: December 6, 1887; Bereznyaki, Cherkassy uezd, Kiev Governorate, Russian Empire
- Died: August 19, 1938 (aged 50)
- Allegiance: Russian Empire; Soviet Union
- Branch: Imperial Russian Army; Soviet Red Army
- Service years: 1918–1938 (Soviet Union)
- Rank: Komkor
- Commands: 2nd Cavalry Corps
- Conflicts: World War I Russian Civil War

Nikolai Nikolayevich Krivoruchko (Russian: Николай Николаевич Криворучко; Ukrainian: Микола Миколайович Криворучко; December 6, 1887 – August 19, 1938) was a Soviet Komkor (corps commander). He fought in the Imperial Russian Army in World War I before going over to the Bolsheviks during the subsequent civil war. He was a recipient of the Order of Lenin and the Order of the Red Banner. During the Great Purge, he was arrested on February 21, 1938 and later executed.

== Awards ==
- Order of Lenin (1935)
- Two Orders of the Red Banner (11.11.1921, 31.10.1930)

== Memorial ==
- In Uman (Cherkasy region, Ukraine) there is street called Krivoruchko.

Preceded by Grigory Kotovsky	Commander of the 2nd Cavalry Corps; August 6, 1925 – July 1937	Succeeded by Mikhail Hatskilevich
