= Panteleimon Romanov =

Russian writer (1884–1938)

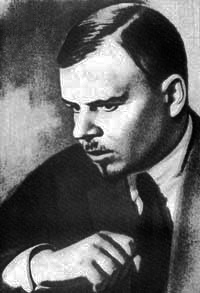
- Born: July 24, 1884; Tula Oblast, Russian Empire
- Died: April 8, 1938 (aged 53); Moscow, Russian SFSR, USSR

Panteleimon Sergeyevich Romanov (Russian: Пантелеймон Серге́евич Романов; July 24, 1884 – April 8, 1938) was a Russian/Soviet writer.

== Biography ==
Romanov was born into a gentry family in the village of Petrovskoe in what is now Tula Oblast. After completing his law studies at Moscow State University, he devoted himself to literature. He published his first story in 1911, but had little success before the 1917 Revolution.

He published Childhood in 1920. Since he wrote to express his philosophy, he was not put off by the work's lack of success. Anna Gattinger, the author of the master's degree thesis Literary Heritage of Panteleymon Romanov, 1883–1938, wrote that Childhood was Romanov's first published work.

He became one of the best known Soviet authors of the 1920s and 1930s. He won most of his fame with short satirical stories exposing the ignorance, inefficiency and cowardice of the new Soviet bureaucrats and their aides. He also devoted his attention to the sexual revolution of the 1920s, sometimes in works that were considered too graphic by contemporary standards, as in the story Without Bird-Cherry Blossoms (1926). He wrote novels in the epic manner, including Childhood (1926) and his five volume series Russia (1922–1936), dealing with rural life in pre-revolutionary Russia.

On August 23, 1934, Romanov make a short but important speech at the First Soviet Writers Congress. In it he made it clear that he was an enthusiastic member of the Communist Party, urging writers to "reconstruct the human soul", to become "engineers of the soul." He expressed firm support of the Five-Year Plans and of the goal of communism.

In 1938, he died of heart disease. The Writers' Union did not publish an obituary.

After his death and until 1980s, Romanov's works were not published in the Soviet Union. In 1964 Gattinger wrote that Romanov "is not counted among those who have made a worthy contribution to Soviet letters." Several collections, including unpubished texts, appeared in 1980-2000s. Despite this, in 2007 the book The Fatal Eggs and Other Soviet Satire stated that Romanov is "virtually unknown in Russia" because Romanov's name had been "deleted from history" with his books taken out of circulation, and he had never "been accorded with even partial rehabilitation in the post-Stalin era".

== Works ==
- Childhood (1920)
- Rus is a series of short stories that had originally been written as humorous but had been rewritten to be more serious. Gattinger described it as Romanov's "greatest work".
- The Right to Live – a novel
- Comrade Kislyakov – a novel

English translations:

- Three Pairs of Silk Stockings, E. Benn Limited, London, 1931.
- Diary of a Soviet Marriage, Hyperion Press, 1975.
- On the Volga and Other Stories, Hyperion Press, 1978.
- Without Bird-Cherry Blossoms, from Great Soviet Short Stories, Dell, 1991.
