= Juho Perälä =

Finnish politician (1887–1938)

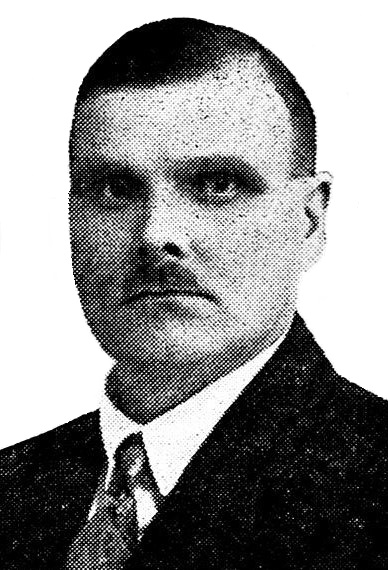
Perälä in 1929

Juho Sylvester Perälä (24 August 1887 – 20 January 1938; also known as Sylvester Perälä; named as Soviet citizen Иван Иванович Перяля) was a Finnish farmer and politician. He was born in Teuva. Originally a member of the Social Democratic Party of Finland (SDP), he later joined the Socialist Workers' Party of Finland (SSTP), which was banned in 1923. In 1925 Perälä joined the still illegal Communist Party of Finland (SKP). He was a member of the Parliament of Finland from 1928 to 1930, representing the pro-communist but till then legal Socialist Electoral Organisation of Workers and Smallholders (STPV), which was banned in 1930.

In July 1930, Perälä was abducted by activists of the anti-communist Lapua Movement, which forced him to cross the border to the Soviet Union. In 1931 Perälä became a Soviet citizen. He joined the Communist Party of the Soviet Union and was active as a party functionary in the Karelian ASSR. On 14 November 1935 he was expelled from the Communist Party. As one of the victims of the Great Purge, he was arrested by the NKVD on 10 December 1937, sentenced to death and shot in Medvezhyegorsk on 20 January 1938. He was posthumously rehabilitated by Soviet authorities in 1956.
