= Vladimir Bogushevsky =

Bolshevik politician

Vladimir Sergeevich Bogushevsky (Russian: Владимир Сергеевич Богушевский; 1895, Tartu - 31 March 1939, Moscow) was a prominent Bolshevik politician. After a political career of over twenty years he was executed in a purge.

He led the planning and economic department of the GAZ car plant. He was a delegate to the 17th Congress of the CPSU (b). From 1934 to August 1937 he was secretaryof the CPC bureau at the Central Committee of the CPSU.

He was arrested on 25 July 1938 and condemned by the Military Collegium of the Supreme Court of the USSR for participation in a counter-revolutionary terrorist organization. He was sentenced and shot on March 31, 1939. He is buried in the Common Grave Number 1, Donskoye Cemetery.

He was rehabilitated on 26 May 1956, by the Military Collegium of the Supreme Court of the USSR.

The Russian State Archive of Literature and Art has material concerning him including celebrating the life of Vsevolod Meyerhold.
