= Shmidt Subglacial Basin =

Subglacial basin in Antarctica

Coordinates: 72°0′S 106°0′E

Shmidt Subglacial Basin is a large subglacial basin situated southward of Knox Coast in East Antarctica. Named by the Soviet Antarctic Expedition, 1957, after Soviet academician, Professor Otto Yu. Shmidt (1891-1956).
