= Eighth All-Union Congress of Soviets =

The Extraordinary 8th All-Union Congress of Soviets was held in Moscow from November 25 to December 5, 1936, on the last day of its work it approved the new constitution of the Soviet Union, according to which the supreme body of state power of the Soviet Union is a Supreme Soviet of the Soviet Union (instead of a Congress of Soviets of the Soviet Union, which was a supreme body according to the Constitution of 1924). Thus, this was the last Congress of Soviets.

The congress was attended by 2,016 delegates with casting vote (including 419 women). By social composition: workers 42%, peasants 40%, employees 18%. Party affiliation of deputies: Communists 72%, non-partisan 28%. The delegates represented 63 nationalities and were representatives of the councils of all Soviet republics, elected according to the norms: from city councils – 1 deputy from 25 thousand voters; from regional, provincial and republican congresses of councils – 1 deputy from 125 thousand inhabitants.

The congress was opened by the "All–Union Headman" Mikhail Kalinin, who in his opening speech called the proletarian Paris Commune the historical predecessor of the Soviet State. "The victory of the Great October Socialist Revolution found its legal expression in the Constitution of the Russian Socialist Federative Soviet Republic, adopted by the Fifth All–Russian Congress of Soviets in 1918, which included the ‘Declaration of the Rights of the Working and Exploited People’. The victorious proletariat in alliance with the poorest peasantry formalized its dictatorship by law, the task of which was to abolish the exploitation of man by man and divide society into classes, to ruthlessly suppress the exploiters and establish a socialist organization of society", said Kalinin. The first constitution of the Soviet Union in 1922 marked the formation of a new state that united the peoples, but it could not reflect the gains of socialism, which should be done by the adoption of a new constitution.

On the first day of the congress, Joseph Stalin made a keynote speech on the draft new constitution of the Soviet Union. His report contained an analysis of the fundamental changes in the life of the country that occurred from 1924 to 1936 and required the adoption of a new constitution.

The congress initially took as a basis the draft constitution of the Soviet Union proposed by the Constitutional Commission. In order to establish the final text of the constitution, taking into account the amendments and additions proposed both during the 5-month public discussion and at the congress itself, an Editorial Committee was formed consisting of 220 people, chaired by Stalin. On December 5, 1936, at its 12th, last meeting, the congress unanimously approved the final text of the Constitution of the Soviet Union submitted by the Editorial Committee, which was in force until the adoption of the 1977 Constitution of the Soviet Union.

Molotov on November 29, 1936 at the 8th All-Union Congress of Soviets said:

We have no other feelings for the great German people, except for a sense of friendship and true respect, but the Nazi gentlemen would best be attributed to such a nation, a "nation" of a "higher order", which is called the "nation" of modern cannibals.

== Sources ==
- Sidorov. Extraordinary Eighth Congress of Soviets of the Soviet Union // Soviet Historical Encyclopedia – Moscow: Soviet Encyclopedia. Edited by Evgeny Zhukov. 1973–1982
- Extraordinary 8th All-Union Congress of Soviets. Verbatim Report – Moscow, 1936
