= Shabdar Osyp =

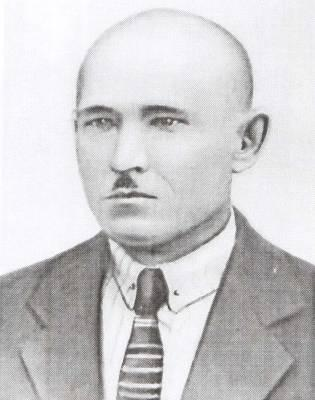
Shabdar Osyp

Shabdar Osyp (Mari: Шабда́р О́сып, 27 March 1898 – 11 November 1937) was a Mari author.

He was born as Iosif Arkhipovich Shabdarov (Russian: Иóсиф Архи́пович Шабдáров) in the village of Malaya Luzhala in Mari El.

He started writing poetry in 1918. He studied at a pedagogical college in Kazan.

Like most of the Mari intelligentsia at the time, he became a victim of stalinism and was executed in Yoshkar-Ola on 11 November 1937. He was rehabilitated posthumously.
