= Alfred Arthur Greenwood Hales =

Australian novelist and war correspondent (1860–1936)

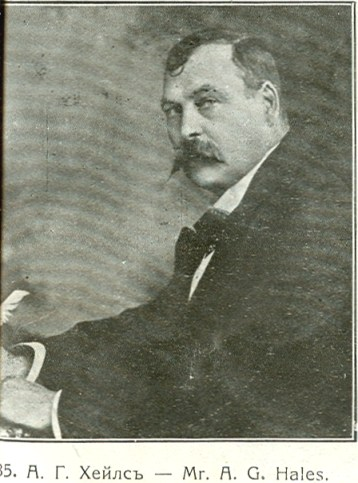

Alfred Arthur Greenwood Hales (21 July 1860 – 29 December 1936) was an Australian novelist and war correspondent.

Hales was born at Kent Town, Adelaide, the son of Frederick Greenwood Hales, a wood-turner, and his wife Sarah Leigh, née Veal.

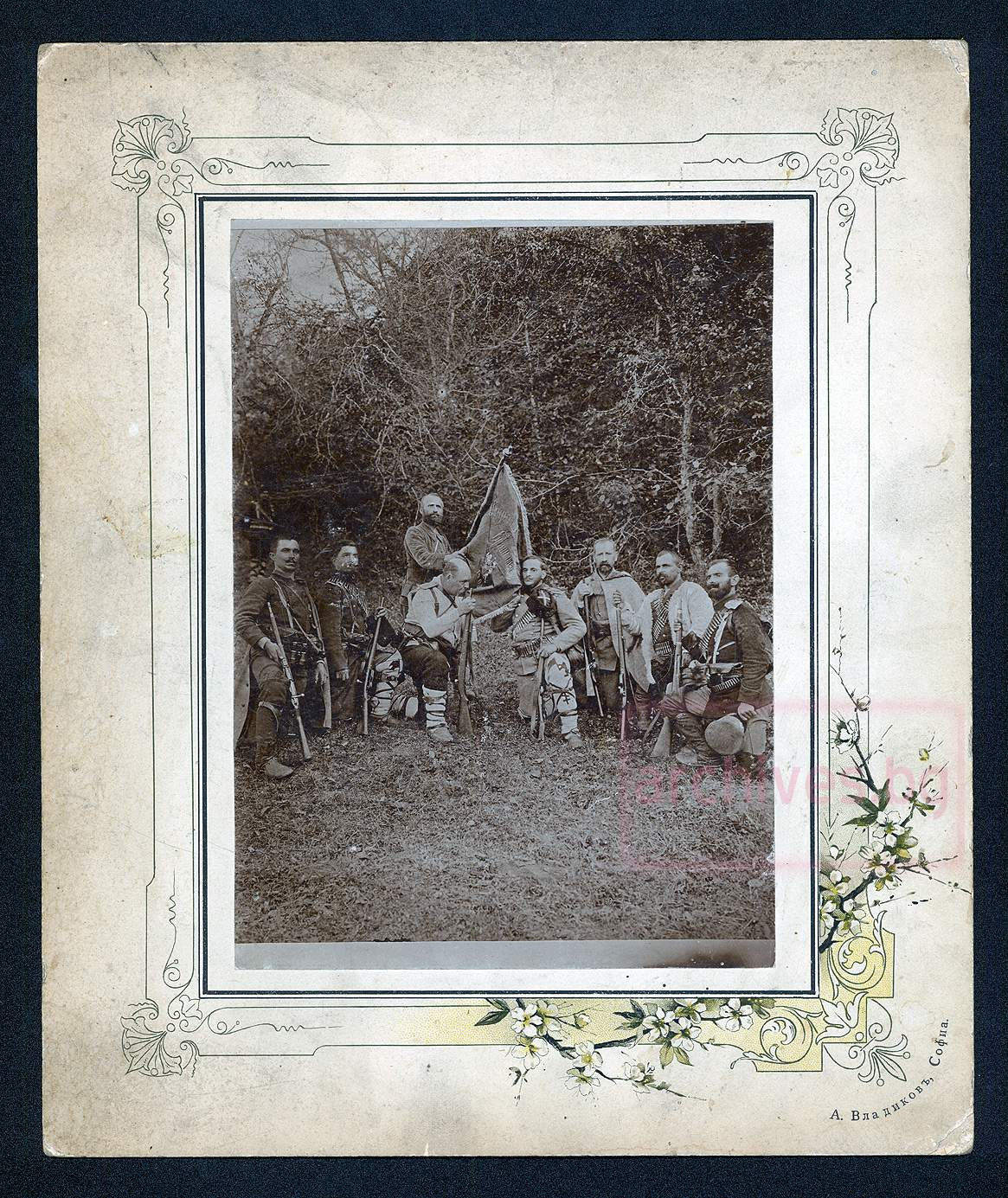
Foreign correspondents Alfred Hales and Boris L. Tageev in Ivan Tsonchev's band during the Ilinden–Preobrazhenie Uprising, 1903. Tsonchev is holdind the flag, Hales is kissing it, Tageev is under the flag

He went to Bulgaria and fought in the Ilinden–Preobrazhenie Uprising against the Turks in 1903 in the band of general Ivan Tsonchev – the leader of the Supreme Macedonian-Adrianople Committee.
