= Martha Ruben-Wolf =

German physician and author

- Born: 17 June 1887; Löhne, Westphalia, German Empire
- Died: 16 August 1939 (aged 52); Moscow, Soviet Union
- Occupations: Physician/gynaecologist; Travel writer Political and feminist activist Family planning pioneer
- Known for: Her death by suicide after the disappearance of her husband during the Stalin purges.
- Political party: USPD; KPD
- Spouse: Lothar Wolf (1882–1938)
- Children: Sonja (1923–1986); Walter (1925–1943)
- Parent(s): Moritz "Max" Ruben; Regina Stern

Martha Ruben-Wolf (17 June 1887 – 16 August 1939) was a German physician and author who became a political activist (KPD) after World War I.

After the Nazi take-over in January 1933 she emigrated with her family, ending up living permanently in the Soviet Union. A series of disappointments followed and she became increasingly disillusioned with the Soviet system which earlier, when she had written about the Soviet Union as a visitor from the west, she had eulogised. Her husband was identified as a Gestapo spy and executed in 1938. On 16 August 1939 Martha Ruben-Wolf was still unaware of what had happened to her husband following his arrest on 27 November 1937 when, despairing, she committed suicide by taking an overdose of sleeping pills.

== Life ==
Martha Ruben was born in Löhne, a small manufacturing town to the north of Paderborn. Moritz "Max" Ruben, her father, is described as a small businessman of Jewish provenance. Her upbringing was not a religious one, however. The family were relatively mobile, while the focus of Max's business changed several times as Martha was growing up. Her mother, born Regina Stern, was a teacher who was active in the women's movement ("bürgerliche Frauenbewegung"), and who through these involvements came into contact with Helene Stöcker and, presumably, with the powerful currents of the times involving pacifism, sexual reform and women's rights issues on which Stöcker campaigned.

In 1906 Martha started to study Mathematics and Natural sciences at Berlin University and the Technische Hochschule in Charlottenburg (now Technische Universität Berlin), funding her studies through a combination of private tutoring, bursaries and journalism. In 1908 she switched to medicine which she studied till 1914, receiving her doctorate in medicine in 1915. She had studied subjects which were traditionally male preserves, but the labour shortages resulting from the slaughter of the First World War would open up opportunities after 1918 which most observers in 1914 would have regarded as still unrealistic. During the First World War she worked in a hospital. After 1918 she set herself up as a doctor in the Berlin quarter of Niederschöneweide. Her feminism and her leftwing political commitment meant that the focus of her work was on working class women: sources describe her as a gynaecologist which, whether through training or practical experience, she became. This also involved a lot of work in the area of birth control, which then as throughout the twentieth century was frequently border-line controversial.

In (or before) 1919 Martha Ruben joined the short-lived Independent Social Democratic Party (" Unabhängige Sozialdemokratische Partei Deutschlands" / USPD) which had broken away from the mainstream Social Democratic Party in 1917 after three years of increasingly intense opposition within that party to the decision of the party leadership, implemented back in 1914, to operate what amounted to a parliamentary truce on the issue of parliamentary votes on funding for the war. After the USPD in turn broke apart, on 4 December 1920 she joined the recently launched Communist Party of Germany. Someone else who switched to the communist party around this time was Lothar Wolf (1882–1938), the son of a Jewish hotelier and another recently qualified doctor. Lothar Wolf and Martha Ruben married on 9 November 1922. They are described at this time as being among the best known communist personalities in Berlin.

Through the 1920s Martha Ruben-Wolf pursued her work as a physician. Abortion was a controversial issue in Germany through the period and the laws on it changed frequently, but it remained illegal. As a qualified doctor who was nevertheless prepared to perform abortions, Ruben-Wolf's services were much in demand, and there is an estimate quoted by one source that by 1933 she had illegally performed around 3,000 abortions, in the face of constant opposition "from middle class physicians, police, local state prosecutors, provocateurs and blackmailers". She and her husband were also active in the party. She was a co-founder of the Rote Frauen und Mädchenbund ("Red Women's and Girls' League" / RFMB) and in 1926 addressed the first national party congress. Her provocative article-manifesto "Abtreibung oder Verhütung" (loosely: "Abortion or Prevention") appeared with a preface by Friedrich Wolf and was reprinted several times. According to one estimate, by 1931 more than 150,000 copies had been printed.

She stood for election to the regional parliament ("Preußischer Landtag") in 1928 and to the national parliament ("Reichstag") in 1930 and again in March 1933, but without being elected.

In 1925, 1926, 1927 and 1930, with her husband, she visited and toured the Soviet Union. They undertook these visits not at the direction from the party but at their own expense. During the 1920s and 1930s Lothar and Martha Wolf published a succession of travel reports, concentrating particularly on trips they made to the Soviet Union and Italy. From these it is clear that Martha Ruben-Wolf saw the Soviet Union as a beacon for the future, making favourable comparisons between the Soviet style "planned economy" and western experience of "the death of capitalism". It must be acknowledged that at the start of a decade that kicked off with the Great Depression, and before rumours began to seep through of the political purges that swept Moscow during the second half of the decade, these opinions were not so bizarre as, viewed through the prism of subsequent events, they later seemed. Martha Ruben-Wolf had been a member of the Union of German Doctors ("Hartmannbund") since 1911, and in 1931 she led what one source describes as the first ever delegation of physicians from Germany to the Soviet Union. She spoke out against § 218 of the German constitution- the "Abortion clause" which she dubbed the "Prison paragraphs" because of the threatened penalties they included for doctors and midwives. She contrasted what she characterised as the enlightened approach taken in the Soviet Union with the situation in Germany.

During the later 1920s the abortion issue became highly charged politically in Germany, and Martha Ruben-Wolf's activism gained increasing coverage; but it also drew hostility. In 1929 copies of her pamphlet "Abtreibung oder Verhütung" (loosely: "Abortion or Prevention") were confiscated on orders from the regional court in Düsseldorf. The Union of Socialist Doctors, which politically aligned itself closely with the Social Democratic Party excluded her in or shortly after 1929. High-profile campaigning on an increasingly contentious topic was making her an uncomfortable political ally in some quarters.

As a result of her stance on abortion Martha Ruben-Wolf lived under constant threat of arrest by 1933. The scale of the personal risk changed after the Nazis took power at the start of that year and lost little time in transforming Germany into a one-party dictatorship. The new regime enjoyed, at this stage, widespread support, based on a traditional populist cocktail of hatred and hope. The hatred was focused on two groups in particular: Communists and Jews. Lothar and Martha Ruben-Wolf belonged in both categories. Like many others similarly placed, they chose emigration in order to avoid arrest and worse. In February 1933 they crossed the border with their two children into Switzerland, settling briefly in Lugano where they stayed at a guest house. Back in Germany the doctors' surgery in Berlin was closed down. Their furniture and life insurance policies were confiscated by the state and their right to practice medicine cancelled through revocation of their membership of the local "Ärztekammer" (literally: "Chamber of Physicians").

Fellow political exiles in Lugano included Bertolt Brecht and Lion Feuchtwanger. However, despite the mountains, Nazi Germany still felt menacingly close. Feuchtwanger had already written a lengthy English language drama which was presented in the United States and United Kingdom, giving detailed accounts of Nazi persecution against Jews in Germany. The Nazis were incensed and he was receiving large amounts of threatening mail from Germany. All the friends moved on, further away from Germany: in October 1933 Lothar and Martha Ruben-Wolf moved to Paris while their two children, at this stage, stayed in Switzerland where they were placed in a children's home. Paris had become the informal capital in the west for exiled German communists and the Ruben-Wolfs made contact with various groups including physicians and authors. In the end they decided that as card carrying communists their prospects in France were uncertain and that they had a better chance of building a future in the other preferred destination of exiled German communists, Moscow. They sought permission to relocate to Moscow, which in effect on 29 December 1933 they received in a letter from Fritz Heckert, who by now was himself based in Moscow and acting as the Comintern presidium member representing the interests of German party members. It was, perhaps, prescient that they had already, in 1932, transferred 600 Marks to the "Weltoktober" housing co-operative in Moscow which would entitle them, it was said, to three rooms in one of the large Soviet style communal apartment buildings. Visas were received and the children were retrieved from Switzerland. On 11 February 1934 the family of four left Paris for the journey to Moscow, where they arrived on 27 February 1934.

When they arrived in Moscow they were placed in a room in a Moscow hotel while their two children were placed in a children's home 300 kilometers away in Ivanovo. Martha visited the institution and wrote a strong letter of complaint about the unhygienic conditions and the failures of child care. This led to a commission of enquiry being set up but it also led to the children being threatened with expulsion from the home. Eventually a room for the children was found in the hotel where their parents had been placed. It was only in April 1936, following a court judgement, that their right to three rooms in the "Weltoktober" housing co-operative was acknowledged.

Lothar Ruben-Wolf took a job with the All Union Institute of Experimental Medicine (WIEM) where he was set to work on fascist race theories. Martha Ruben-Wolf was employed as a gynaecologist in The Eighth Moscow Abortion clinic. She was disappointed to find that in the eyes of senior colleagues her German qualifications and experience counted for very little. There was plenty of work to be done, but she experienced the absence of professional status acutely. A particular disappointment came in June 1936 when the Soviet Union reverted to the more conservative stance on birth control already enforced in Germany, and abortion, a topic as politicised in the Soviet Union as in the west, again became illegal. As the political climate in Moscow turned increasingly ugly, Martha Ruben-Wolf experienced four months of unemployment, and then was given a relatively poorly paid job with Intourist, the state tourism agency. The leader was becoming increasingly paranoid. German political refugees who had come to Moscow in search of safety were increasingly in danger of being identified and denounced as Trotskyites or agents of the German government or both.

Although it took a few months for the realities of the Stalinist purges to become apparent, Martha Ruben-Wolf was forced to become aware of the extent to which friends were disappearing, notably after her husband was arrested by the security services on 28 November 1937 or 15 January 1938. (Sources differ.) Accused of being a Gestapo spy, on 4 October 1938 he was sentenced to death and shot. It is not clear whether Martha ever learned of his fate. She certainly devoted desperate energy, apparently without success, to trying to find out what had happened to him after he disappeared.

On 16 August 1939 or 16 July 1940 Martha Ruben-Wolf committed suicide. (Again, sources differ as to the date.) By this time she had been able to return to the medical profession, first as a nurse and then as a doctor. The cause of her death is given as an overdose of sleeping pills.

Her children were deported to Karaganda in Kazakhstan in 1941. Sonja married Israel Friedmann, a Zionist from Lithuania, in 1942. In 1944 she gave birth to the couple's daughter and in 1948 they were permitted to move to Vilnius. Lithuania had been part of the Soviet Union since 1940, and it was only in 1958 that Sonja was permitted, with her family, to leave the Soviet Union. They were released to East Germany but were able to relocate to West Germany from where, still in 1958, they emigrated to Israel. Martha's younger child, Walter was conscripted into the Red Army and killed in action in 1943.
