= Artem Jijikhia =

Artem Jijikhia (Dzhidzhikhia; Georgian: არტემ ჯიჯიხია; Russian: Артемий Мурзаканович Джиджихия) (January 2, 1874 – December 31, 1938) was a Georgian military officer who served in the armies of the Russian Empire and Democratic Republic of Georgia. He was executed during Joseph Stalin’s Great Purge.

Jijikhia attended the Tiflis Theological Seminary, but joined the Imperial Russian military in 1893. He graduated from the Tiflis Infantry Junker School in 1897 and received a podporuchik’s commission in Turkestan where he spent several years and authored several works on Bukhara, including a comprehensive and reliable account of the 1910 Shia-Sunni clashes in the region.

In 1910, Jijikhia, already a captain, was transferred in Congress Poland to serve in the staff of the 6th Infantry Division and then of the 15th Army Corps in which he served during World War I. He took part in the Russian invasion of East Prussia (1914) and was captured by the Germans in the Battle of Tannenberg (1914). Once released, he joined the army of the newly established and initially German-friendly independent Georgian republic in 1918 and was promoted to major general in 1919. During the Soviet Russian offensive against the Georgian capital of Tiflis in 1921, he commanded an attack force of 5 People’s Guard battalions and a cavalry brigade which successfully defended the approaches to the capital, but the battle was ultimately lost and Georgia became a Soviet republic. Jijikhia became victim of the Stalinist purges in 1938.
