= Vladimir Gorev =

- Born: Vladimir Efimovich Gorev; 1900; Velizh, Russian Empire (now Russian Federation)
- Died: 20 June 1938 (aged 37–38); Soviet Union
- Military career
- Allegiance: Soviet Union
- Branch: Red Army
- Service years: 1918–1938
- Rank: Kombrig
- Nicknames: Vladimir Gorev, Sancho, Nikitin, Gordon
- Conflicts: Russian Civil War; Chinese Civil War; Spanish Civil War

Vladimir Efimovich Gorev (1900 - 20 June 1938), known as Vladimir Gorev, was a Belarusian soldier known to have participated in the defense of Madrid as a Soviet military advisor during the Spanish Civil War. He was born in 1900 in Velizh, Vitebsk Governorate (now in Smolensk Oblast). He was of Belarusian ethnicity.

== Career ==
Gorev had combat experience in the Russian Civil War (1918–1921) and had then been an advisor in China (known under aliases "Nikitin" and "Gordon") to accelerate sovietization during the Chinese Civil War.

Gorev joined the Spanish Republican front in late August 1936 as a military attache under the alias "Sancho." His presence as a military advisor in the Siege of Madrid was praised by Lieutenant Colonel Vicente Rojo Lluch, as well as later with the Chief of State greater army of the North, the Communist military Francisco Ciutat de Miguel (called "Angelito"). With such prestige he joined the Spanish Republican Army in the North in the spring of 1937 instead of Kiril Jackson. In the War in the North, for example in the Defense of Bilbao Basque officials reports were not so good and questioned its merits in the war tactics of such fighting. Dropped the northern front, Gorev failed to escape Franco's siege and took refuge, along with other soldiers many Republicans, in the Asturian mountains, although at the end of year it managed to be rescued. He was called back to Madrid, and from there returned to the USSR in October 1937. Upon his return to the Soviet Union, he was awarded the Order of Lenin and the Order of the Red Banner. During the Great Purge, he was arrested by the NKVD on 25 January 1938, sentenced to death on 20 June 1938 and shot the same day. He was posthumously rehabilitated in October 1956.

== See also ==
- Red Army
- Russian Civil War
- Chinese Civil War
- Spanish Civil War

== External sources ==
- Volodarsky, Boris (2013). El caso Orlov: los servicios secretos soviéticos en la guerra civil española. Barcelona: Crítica. ISBN 978-84-9892-553-1.
- Aizpuru, Mikel (2009). El informe Brusiloff: la Guerra Civil de 1936 en el Frente Norte vista por un traductor ruso. Madrid: Irún : Alberdania Editora. p. 255. ISBN 9788498680560. LCCN 2010366106.
- András Rojo, José (1993). Anátesis / José Vicente Rojo. Madrid: Amós Belinchón. ISBN 8486796415. LCCN 94213009.
- Fernández Sánchez, José (1990). Los voluntarios de Vladimir Gorev / José Fernández Sánchez. Madrid: Ediciones El Museo Universal. p. 78. ISBN 8486207320. LCCN 94196933.
