= Sofia Sokolovskaya =

Russian revolutionary, politician and senior official

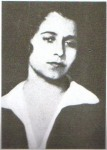

Sofia Ivanovna Sokolovskaya (Russian: Софья Ивановна Соколовская), also known as Yelena Kirillovna Svetlova (Елена Кирилловна Светлова) (10 April 1894 – 26 August 1938) was a Russian revolutionary, politician and senior official of the Soviet film industry until she became a victim of the Great Purge.

== Biography ==
Sofia Sokolovskaya was born into a middle-class intellectual family in Odessa, where her father practised law. Her parents, who were socialists in the Narodnaya Volya tradition, moved to Chernigov (Chernihiv) when she was nine. She became involved in revolutionary politics at school. She joined the Bolsheviks as a student in St Petersburg in 1915. In January 1918, after the Bolshevik Revolution, 23-year-old Sokolovskaya was elected chairman of the executive committee of the soviets for Chernigov province. While Ukraine was under German occupation, the authorities put a price of 5,000 roubles on her head, but when German troops came to arrest her in Kiev, she duped them by pretending to be German herself, speaking to them in fluent German.

=== Revolution in Odessa ===
In November 1918, Sokolovskaya was appointed secretary of the Bolshevik organisation in Odessa, which was occupied by French forces after the Germans had withdrawn. In April 1919, she led the delegation that met General d'Anselme to negotiate the French withdrawal. When the Bolsheviks took over Odessa on 4–5 April 1919, she was installed as head of the city soviet, and hence the first communist 'mayor' of Odessa. The French sailors nicknamed her "Russian Jeanne d'Arc". She was arrested in the streets when the White Russian army commanded by General Denikin overran Odessa. Although she was able to escape, it was assumed that she had been killed. Her future husband Yakov Yakovlev wrote an obituary in which he paid tribute to "the wonderful combination in her of outward carelessness with deep thoughtfulness, joyful young enjoyment of life with some old, only the experience of life."

In December, Sokolovskaya was sent to Italy, and later France, as an agent of the Comintern. She married Yakovlev in 1921. Her official biography listed her as having worked in very minor posts in the 1920s, giving rise to speculation that, with her linguistic skills, she was actually employed by Soviet intelligence in those years. In 1930, she was appointed a member of the Central Control Commission and head of a commission in charge of purging the Soviet apparatus.

=== Role in the film industry ===
In 1935, Sokolovskaya was appointed deputy director of Mosfilm, the USSR's leading film studio. At that time, the head of the film industry, Boris Shumyatsky was orchestrating a campaign against the Soviet Union's most renowned film director, Sergei Eisenstein. In March 1937, as the Great Purge was underway, Shumyatsky wrote a note to the Soviet prime minister, Vyacheslav Molotov, accusing Sokolovskaya of being the leader of a 'clique' who had held a private showing of Eisenstein's banned film "Bezhin Meadow" and were agitating to get the ban lifted. In May 1937, the Central Committee overruled Shumyatsky, and Sokolovskaya had a hand in commissioning Eisenstein to make Alexander Nevsky, one of the finest films produced in the USSR in the 1930s. She was briefly head of Mosfilm after the arrest and execution of the previous head, V.A. Babitsky.

=== Arrest and death ===
Sokolovskaya and her husband, Yakovlev were both arrested on 12 October 1937. She co-operated with her interrogators from the start. She wrote a self-incriminating letter to Joseph Stalin saying “I didn’t find the courage to break out of this counter-revolutionary filth, come to the party and expose this gang of enemies of the party and the people." As early as 15 October, her husband was told during an interrogation that she had denounced him. This did not save her. On 7 November, Stalin told the head of Comintern, Georgi Dimitrov, that she was a "French spy" who had betrayed the Bolsheviks in Odessa in 1918. She was shot on 26 August 1938 and posthumously rehabilitated in 1956.
