= Boris L. Tageev =

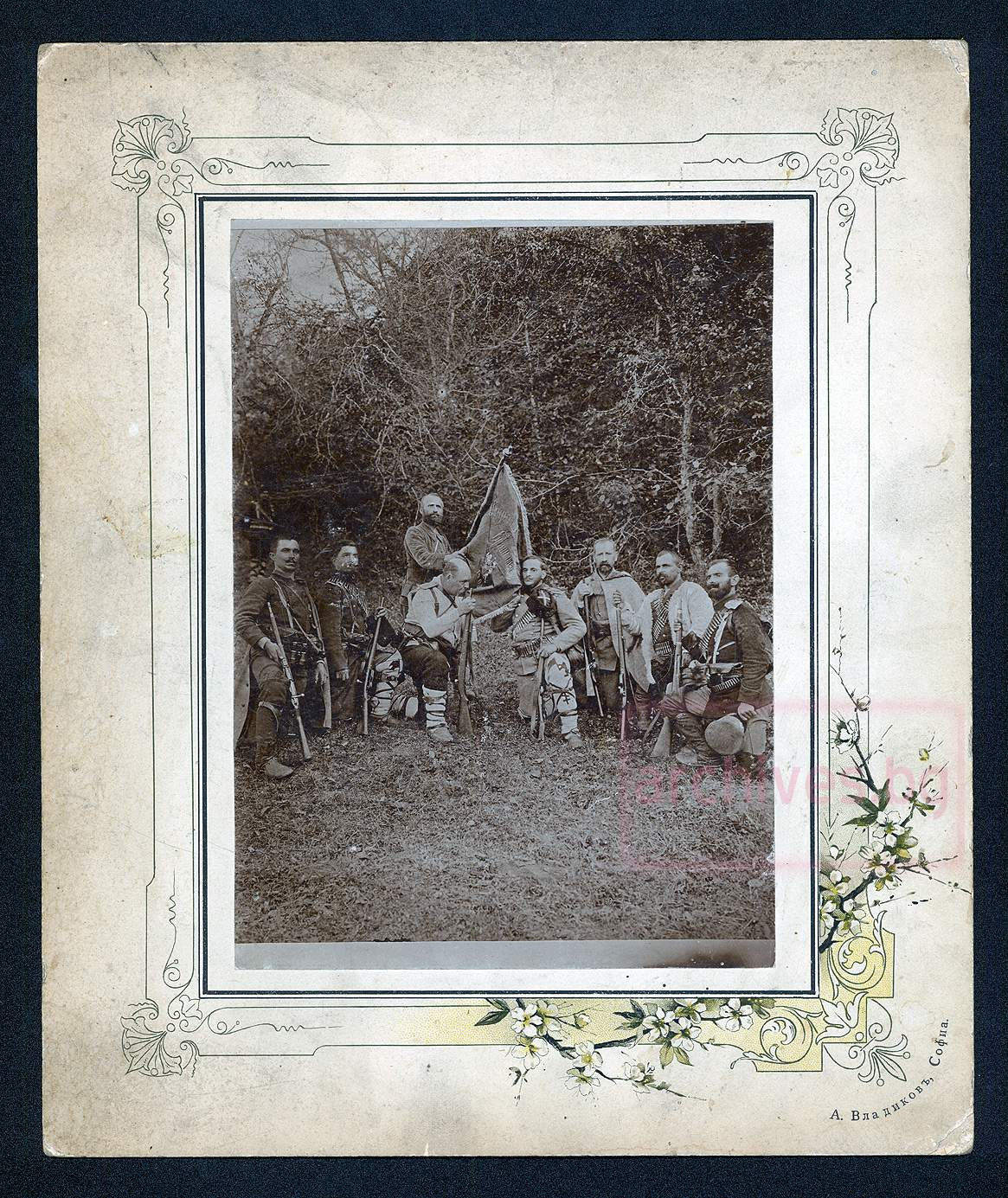
Foreign correspondents Alfred Hales and Boris Tageev in Ivan Tsonchev's band during the Ilinden–Preobrazhenie Uprising, 1903. Tsonchev is holding the flag, Hales is kissing it, Tageev is under the flag

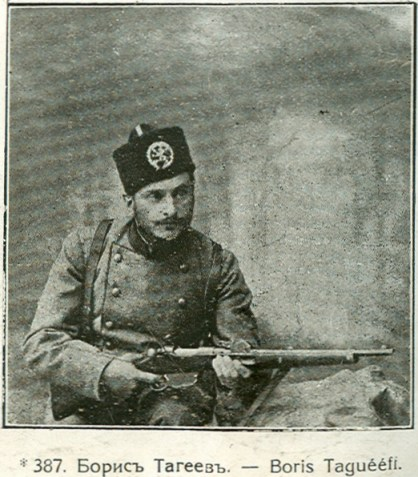
Tageev in the SMAC band

Boris Leonidovich Tageev (Russian: Борис Леонидович Тагеев; 1871–1938) was a Russian Orientalist, explorer, and writer.

== Life ==
Boris Leonidovich Tageev was born in St. Petersburg to a family of the lawyer. As a young man Tageev entered the Russian Imperial Army and applied his Persian and Uzbek language skills by volunteering in 1892 for the 1st line Turkestan Battalion as an ensign. From 1892 to 1895 he was stationed in the Pamir Mountains during the division of region by Russia, Afghanistan and the Qing dynasty. He also traveled through Afghan Turkestan, where he collected information on the Afghan military and local peoples. In 1901 he left military as a lieutenant.

In 1903 he went to Bulgaria and fought in the Ilinden–Preobrazhenie Uprising against the Turks in the band of general Ivan Tsonchev – the leader of the Supreme Macedonian-Adrianople Committee.

In 1904 he was assigned to the Russian Supreme Headquarters in the Far East and was captured by the Japanese during the Russo-Japanese War of 1904–1905. He was released by the Japanese after the war and traveled to Harbin, Japan, the Philippines, Australia, and the Hawaiian Islands before finally settling in the United States. During WWI he volunteered for military service in the British Armed Forces and was commissioned as a lieutenant-colonel. During the war he also worked as a correspondent for the Daily Express. When the war ended he returned to the United States and continued work as a journalist, but in 1920 he returned to Russia. In 1922 he went to China and worked as an editor and later he returned to the Soviet Union to work as a consultant in the studios of Soyuzdetfilm.

In his writings published after he immigrated to the United States, Tageev occasionally published under the name Boris Rustam-Bek-Tageev.

On October 19, 1937, Tageev was arrested and given the death sentence for treason, organizing counter-revolutionary actions and complicity in terrorist activities. He was shot in 1938, but was later rehabilitated.

== List of publications ==
- Panama Russkago flota. Izd. avtora, 1908
- Korenʹ zla: t︠s︡arskīe oprichniki na Dalʹnem Vostoki︠e︡, Tip. I︠A︡. E. Kleĭdmana, 1909.
- Aerial Russia: the romance of the giant aeroplane. John Lane, 1916.
