= Yakov Yakovlev =

Soviet politician and statesman

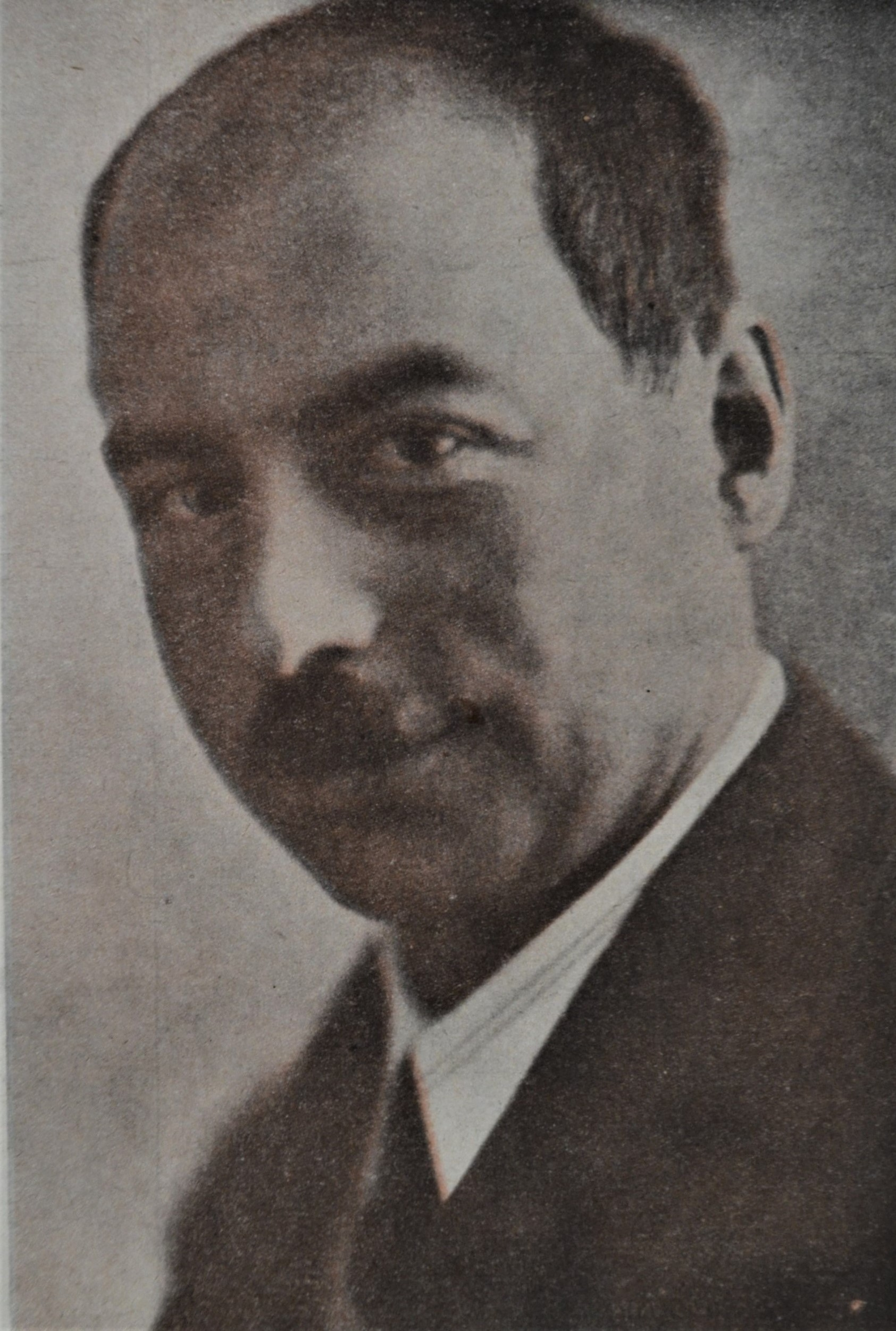
Yakov Yakovlev (1929)

Yakov Arkadyevich Yakovlev (Russian: Я́ков Арка́дьевич Я́ковлев, 9 June 1896 – 29 July 1938) was a Soviet politician and statesman who played a central role in the forced collectivisation of agriculture in the 1920s.

== Early career ==
Yakov Yakovlev was born in Grodno, in Belarus. His father was a teacher, of Jewish descent. He joined the Bolsheviks in 1913, as a student at St Petersburg Polytechnic. After the Bolshevik Revolution in 1917, he was secretary of the party organisation in Yekaterinoslav (Dnipro) in Ukraine. He was a leader of the right wing of the Ukrainian Communist Party (b), who were in control through most of the Russian Civil War. Ousted by the left in March 1920, he was appointed a member of the Politburo of the Ukrainian party in April, after Moscow had intervened.

In 1921, Yakovlev was transferred to Moscow, to work for the RSFSR People's Commissariat for Education, and the Agitprop department of the Central Committee. He edited the newspaper "Krestyanskaya Gazeta" (Peasants' Gazette) in 1923–29, and Bednota – the newspaper for poor and landless peasants – in 1924–28. In January 1923, he led the attack on Proletkult and its founder Alexander Bogdanov, criticizing him in Pravda for being a Menshevik. In May 1924, he chaired the first party conference on literature, at which Leon Trotsky was the main speaker. Yakovlev defended Trotsky's view that it was too early to expect works of literature written by factory workers to dominate Soviet literature, and in the meantime writers should learn from poets like Mayakovsky, Pasternak and even Shakespeare. Yakovlev continued to defend the line after Trotsky's fall, by publishing an attack on the journal, in June 1925, on the journal Na Postu, published by RAPP. Possibly for that reason, he ceased working in education in 1926, when he was appointed deputy head of Rabkrin.

== Commissar for Agriculture ==
Until 1929, agriculture was the responsibility of the member states that made up the USSR, but after Joseph Stalin decided to force the peasants to join collective farms, the USSR People's Commissariat for Agriculture was created, on 12 August 1929, with Yakovlev as People's Commissar. During collectivisation, he was so influential that on 4 November 1930, the chairman of the government of the Russian Federation, Sergey Syrtsov complained to the Politburo that "everything is decided behind the back of the Politburo by a tiny group" which included Yakovlev, while exuding nominally much more senior figures, such as Kliment Voroshilov, who was People's Commissar for Defence and a full member of the Politburo. At the time, Yakovlev was not a member even of the much larger Central Committee of the Communist Party of the Soviet Union, to which he was co-opted in 1931.

In December 1929, Yakovlev produced a report which suggested that "at least a third" of agricultural land in the USSR should be sown collectively in spring 1930. This report was rejected by Stalin, who thought it too cautious. Some of his other proposals, such as allowing peasants to retain ownership of small tools and small livestock, were also overruled by Stalin, whose orders Yakovlev carried out faithfully. The resulting famine cost possibly millions of lives in the Ukrainian Holodomor, and millions more across the rest of the USSR.

Yakovlev was one of the first officials to sponsor the career of the now-discredited, quack biologist Trofim Lysenko. He ordered the Odessa Institute of Genetics to create a department to develop 'vernalisation' – a method Lysenko had devised to produce new crop varieties. He believed Lysenko's boast, made late in 1931, that he could increase the yield on Azerbaijan wheat grown in Odessa by 40 per cent by 1934. When the USSR's leading biologist, Nikolai Vavilov warned that developing new varieties and subjecting them to proper tests could take ten years, Yakovlev told him: "We don't have ten years to wait."

In July 1932, Stalin complained that Yakovlev's department had "failed" and was "completely inept" – principally because it had encouraged indiscriminate planting instead of crop rotation. At the end of a criminal trial of economic managers in August 1933, the prosecutor, Andrey Vyshinsky said that the verdict raised "general questions" about Yakovlev's department. Yakovlev was present at the next Politburo meeting, which forced an apology from Vyshinsky, though Stalin, who was absent from that meeting, subsequently backed Vyshinsky. The following month, Stalin complained that "Yakovlev is no boss but an empty-head and puffed-up windbag."

In April 1934, he was transferred to party headquarters as head of the agricultural department. At the start of the Great Purge, he launched a tirade in the Soviet press against Lysenko's opponents in agricultural science, singling out Vavilov as their leader, and denouncing genetics as a form of religion whose practitioners were "reactionaries and saboteurs."

On 27 July 1937, he was appointed acting First Secretary of the Communist Party of Byelorussia, to oversee the removal of the incumbent First Secretary, Vasily Sharangovich, and the arrests of suspected 'national fascists', but was recalled on 8 August.

== Arrest and Death ==
Nikita Khrushchev described a dinner in Stalin's apartment, at which he and Yakovlev were the only guests:

Yakovlev was in a very agitated state. You could see he was undergoing some sort of inner turmoil. He feared that he was about to be arrested. He wasn't mistaken in his forebodings. Shortly after Stalin's friendly chat with him over dinner, Yakovlev was arrested and eliminated. I'm telling this story to show how even someone as close to Stalin as Yakovlev – who had been one of Stalin's most trusted supporters during the struggle against the opposition – could suddenly find his life hanging by a thread.

Yakovlev was arrested on 12 October 1937. His wife Sofia Sokolovskaya – who was multilingual and had travelled extensively – was arrested on the same day. It appears that she was interrogated first. On 15 October, he was told that she had denounced him as having been a police informer before the 1917 Revolution. In November Stalin told Georgi Dimitrov that "Yakovlev's wife was a French spy", which would imply it was her connections abroad that brought both of them under suspicion.

He denied having been a police informer, but "confessed" to having been a secret supporter of Trotsky since 1922, and a German spy since 1935, and to have been the head of a vast counter-revolutionary organisation to which he had personally recruited more than 100 individuals, whom he named.

When he was expelled from the Central Committee, on 12 December 1937, it was on the grounds that he was a police spy and a German spy, but during the last of the Moscow Show Trials, in March 1938, he was named as "a prominent member of the Right and Trotskyite conspiracy". In the words of the historian, Robert Conquest, it was "extraordinary transmogrification into a Rightist – an odd appellation for the man who had been chief operator in the collectivization field."

Yakovlev was executed on July 29, 1938.

He was posthumously rehabilitated on 5 January 1957.
