= Mikhail Demichev =

- Born: 1885; Russian Empire
- Died: November 19, 1937; Soviet Union
- Allegiance: Russian Empire; Soviet Union
- Service / branch: Imperial Russian Army; Soviet Red Army
- Rank: Komdiv
- Commands: 1st Cavalry Division; 1st Cavalry Corps
- Battles / wars: World War I Russian Civil War

Mikhail Afanasyevich Demichev (Russian: Михаил Афанасьевич Демичев; 1885 – November 19, 1937) was a Red Army komdiv (division commander). He fought in the Imperial Russian Army in World War I before going over to the Bolsheviks in the subsequent Civil War. He was a recipient of the Order of the Red Banner. During the Great Purge, he was arrested on August 9, 1937, and later executed. After the death of Joseph Stalin, he was rehabilitated in 1956.

== Early life, World War I, and Russian Civil War ==
Demichev was born in 1885 to a Russian peasant family in the village of Kuprino, Karachevsky Uyezd, Oryol Governorate. After graduating from the village school, he went to work in Yekaterinoslav, becoming a roller and paperboy at a printing house. Drafted into the Imperial Russian Army in 1908, Demichev served with the 14th Little Russia Dragoon Regiment as a private before rising to non-commissioned officer in 1911. He entered a school for praporshchiks (ensigns) at the division headquarters in 1913, but did not graduate due to the outbreak of World War I. Demichev fought with the regiment in the war and was promoted to praporshchik for distinguishing himself in battle.

After joining the Red Army in June 1918 during the Russian Civil War, Demichev served as a platoon and squadron commander in the 4th Oryol Cavalry Regiment, assistant commander of the 5th Alatyr Cavalry Regiment for personnel, and commander of the latter regiment between 1918 and 1919. On the night of 25 February 1920, during Red attacks on Crimea in early 1920, Demichev led his regiment as part of the 13th Cavalry Brigade in a raid on Tyup-Dzhankoy and put the opposing White forces to flight while suffering minimal casualties. Continuing the pursuit allowed neighbouring units to also advance. For his leadership of the raid, Demichev was awarded the Order of the Red Banner on 11 September. In 1920, with the regiment, he joined the Red Cossacks division and was appointed commander of its 3rd Brigade. He was twice wounded in action during the war.

== Interwar period ==
From December 1920, he led the 8th Cavalry Division, which he commanded until August 1921, when it became the 1st Cavalry Division. Demichev continued in command of the division until 1932, simultaneously serving as its military commissar. He received a second Order of the Red Banner in 1923. During this period he graduated from Higher Academic Courses at the Military Academy of the Red Army in 1924, Courses of Improvement for Higher Officers at the Frunze Military Academy in 1930, and Courses for Commanders at the Tolmachev Military-Political Academy. Advancing to serve as commander and military commissar of the 1st Cavalry Corps in November 1932, Demichev was transferred to the reserve in August 1937 due to "political unreliability." He was arrested on 9 August 1937 and sentenced to death by the Military Collegium of the Supreme Court of the Soviet Union on 19 November, charged with participating in a military conspiracy. Demichev was shot a day later. He was posthumously rehabilitated on 20 October 1956.

== Sources ==
- Червоні аватари України: уніформа орлів Примакова.
- 1-й кавалерийский корпус Червонного казачества имени ВУЦИК и ЛКСМ Украины.
- Кавалерийские корпуса РККА
- Кавалерийская дивизия 14-й армии, с 4.12.19 г. – 8-я кавалерийская дивизия Червонного казачества, с 6.05.22 г. – 1-я кавалерийская Запорожская Червонного казачества Краснознаменная дивизия имени Французской компартии.
- Репрессированные военнослужащие Красной Армии. Комдивы.
- Приказ НКО СССР по личному составу армии от 20 ноября 1935 года. № 2395.
- Сборник лиц награждённых орденом Красного Знамени (РСФСР) и почётным революционным оружием. Демичев Михаил Афанасьевич: Командир полка 5, приказ РВСР № 438: 1920 г. Командир 1-й кавалерийской дивизии Червоного Казачества, приказ РВСР № 56: 1923 г.: Вторичное награждение.
  Preceded by new office	Commander of the 1st Cavalry Division; May 1922 – November 1932	Succeeded by Ivan Nikulin
