= Peter Maximovich Feldman =

Soviet military leader (b. 1899, d. 1938)

- Born: 27 November 1899; Baku, Russian Empire
- Died: 22 August 1938 (aged 38) Moscow, Soviet Union
- Allegiance: Russian Empire; Soviet Union
- Branch: Soviet Red Army
- Service years: 1918–1938 (Soviet Union)
- Conflicts: Russian Civil War

Peter Maximovich Feldman (Russian: Пётр Макси́мович Фе́льдман) (27 November 1899 – 22 August 1938) was a Soviet military and naval leader. He reached the rank of Division commissar. He served as the Head of the Political Department of the Black Sea Fleet of the USSR from May 11, 1937, to January 28, 1938.

== Early life ==
Feldman was born in Baku named Peisach Feldman. His parents were Mendel Feldman (1873 - 1946) and Sarah - Rivah. He studied petroleum engineering at the Alekseevsky Engineering School in Baku. He left to join the revolutionary movement and became a member of the Red Army in August 1918. During the Russian Civil War, he fought in Crimea and the North Caucasus Regions. He met Olga Borisovna Frank, a nurse, during the Siege of Perekop in Crimea in 1920. In 1921 the couple married and had two children: Octyabrina (1922–2014) and Artyom (1925–1993).

== Career ==
On January 20, 1925, he was promoted from a Communist cell organiser in the 1st Rifle Reserve Battalion to the Chief Assistant of the Organisational Department of Political Administration of the Ukrainian Military District. On July 7, 1926, he moved to the Ural Military District, while retaining the same role. On December 10, 1926, he was appointed Deputy Head of the Political Department of the 4th Rifle Division of the Belorussian Military District. On the September 14, 1928, he was appointed Assistant to the Commander and Head of the Political Department of the 5th Vitebsk rifle division of the Belorussian Military District. He graduated from the political branch of KUVNAS at the M. Frunze Military Academy in 1930. On June 26, 1930, he was sent to Moscow as the delegate of the 16th Congress of the All-Union Communist Party (Bolsheviks) with a decisive vote from the Polotsk Party Organisation of the Belorussian Military District.

In November 1930, he became the Military Commissar of the Experimental Mechanised Brigade of the Moscow Military District in Naro-Fominsk. A few months later on the April 8, 1931, he was appointed Head of the Political Department of the (Kalinovski) 1st Separate Mechanised Brigade in Naro-Fominsk. On April 28, 1934, Feldman was appointed Head of the Political Department of the 7th Mechanised Corpus in Leningrad. On September 22, 1935, by order of the USSR People's Commissar of Defence, K. Voroshilov, “On the introduction of personal military ranks for the commanding personnel of the Red Army” No. 2488 (dated November 28, 1935), Feldman was given the rank of Divisional Commissar. On May 11, 1937, Feldman was appointed head of the political department of the Black Sea Fleet and lived in Sevastopol.

This occurred during the time of the Great Purge in the Soviet Union, led by Josef Stalin and Nikolai Yezhov, during which many military and naval leaders were arrested and killed. On January 28, 1938, Feldman was dismissed from his post and enlisted at the disposal of the Directorate for command and commanding personnel of the RKKA. On February 17, 1938, Feldman was called to Moscow and arrested on charges of participating in a counter-revolutionary organisation. As a result, the Supreme Court convicted him under Article 58-1 "b", 58-7 and 58-11 of the Criminal Code of the RSFSR, and he was sentenced to death on August 22, 1938. That same day Feldman was shot by NKVD forces and buried at the Kommunarka, Moscow Region. Feldman's wife Olga was arrested and spent 6 months in the Sevastopol jail before she was released. Olga's mother took children Octyabrina (15) and Artyom (12) to Odessa where she had been living while Olga was imprisoned.

After Stalin's death, Feldman's case was revised by the Military Collegium of the Supreme Court of the USSR. The sentence issued on August 22, 1938, was cancelled due to newly discovered circumstances and the case against Feldman was dropped for lack of corpus delicti.

== Sources ==
- The shot elite of the Red Army|pages 377–378
- F. Sverdlov, "Jews - Generals of the Armed Forces of the USSR" (Short Biographies), M., 1993. In Appendices No. 2–7 on p. 264.
- "Firing lists", a list of those buried near the village of Butovo and the Kommunarka State Farm, Moscow Region, No. 3123, Center for the Study and Storage of East European Jewry Documentation at the University of Jerusalem.
- Souvenirs OF “Tragedy of the Red Army of 1937-1938”, Red Army Martyrology, pp. 167, 380, 397.
- Churakov D., Repressions in the Krasnoi Army, 2004, the commissar of the division, No. 102.
- Military history magazine of the Ministry of Defense of the Russian Federation, No. 12, 1993.
- AP RF, op.24, case 417, page 236 List No. 2 Former. Military workers to be tried by the military collegium of the Supreme Court of the USSR, No. 190 on page 245, signed by the beginning of the 1st special department of the NKVD of the USSR
- Order of the People's Commissar of Defense of the USSR on Army personnel No. 2488 dated November 28, 1935 Moscow
- Repressed soldiers of the Red Army
- AP RF, op.24, case 417, page 245
