= Ivan Nikulin =

Soviet military commander (1898–1937)

- Born: 1898; Russian Empire
- Died: September 8, 1937 (aged 38–39); Soviet Union
- Military career
- Allegiance: Soviet Union
- Branch: Soviet Red Army
- Commands: 1st Cavalry Division

Ivan Yefimovich Nikulin (1898 – September 8, 1937) was a Soviet Kombrig (brigade commander) and division commander. In November 1936 he was transferred to the Special Red Banner Far Eastern Army. During the Great Purge, he was arrested on June 13, 1937, and later executed. After the death of Joseph Stalin, he was rehabilitated in 1957.

Preceded by Mikhail Demichev	Commander of the 1st Cavalry Division; November 1932 – November 1936	Succeeded by Mikhail Hatskilevich

== Bibliography ==
1. Краснознамённый Киевский. Очерки истории Краснознамённого Киевского военного округа (1919–1979). Издание второе, исправленное и дополненное. Киев, издательство политической литературы Украины. 1979. С.14 - 28.12.1917 сформирован полк Червонного казачества Украины, 18.07.1919 полк Червонного казачества развёрнут в бригаду, 1.11.1919 бригада Червонного казачества переформирована в 8-ю дивизию Червонного казачества.
2. Горбатов А.В. Годы и войны. — М.: Воениздат, 1989. Книга на сайте: http://militera.lib.ru/memo/russian/gorbatov/index.html
3. Дубинский Илья. ПРИМАКОВ. Выпуск 2. (445). Основные даты жизни и деятельности В. М. Примакова. (см. lib.rus.ec/b/105117/read)
4. Червонное казачество. Воспоминания ветеранов. Ордена Трудового Красного Знамени Военное издательство Министерства обороны СССР. Москва, 1969, редакторы-составители Е. П. Журавлев, М. А. Жохов.

== Sources ==
1. Червоні аватари України: уніформа орлів Примакова.
2. 1-й кавалерийский корпус Червонного казачества имени ВУЦИК и ЛКСМ Украины.
3. Кавалерийские корпуса РККА
4. Кавалерийская дивизия 14-й армии, с 4.12.19 г. – 8-я кавалерийская дивизия Червонного казачества, с 6.05.22 г. – 1-я кавалерийская Запорожская Червонного казачества Краснознаменная дивизия имени Французской компартии.
5. Репрессированные военнослужащие Красной Армии. Комбриги.
6. Приказ НКО СССР по личному составу армии от 26 ноября 1935 года. № 2394.
