= Ivan Tkachev =

Soviet komkor

Ivan Fyodorovich Tkachev
- Born: 6 August 1896; Tsaritsyn, Russian Empire
- Died: 29 July 1938 (aged 41); Soviet Union
- Military career
- Allegiance: Soviet Union
- Branch: Soviet Red Army
- Service years: 1918–1938
- Rank: Komkor
- Conflicts: Russian Civil War

Ivan Fyodorovich Tkachev (Russian: Иван Фёдорович Ткачёв; 6 August 1896 – 29 July 1938) was a Soviet komkor (corps commander). He was born in present-day Volgograd (called Stalingrad at the time of his death). He fought in the civil war on the side of the Bolsheviks against the White movement. He was a recipient of the Order of the Red Banner. During the Great Purge, he was arrested on 29 January 1938 and later executed. He was buried in Moscow. After the death of Joseph Stalin, he was rehabilitated on 8 February 1956.

Military offices
Preceded by Semyon Turovsky	Commander of the 12th Rifle Corps; February 11, 1932	Succeeded by
