= Vasily Sharangovich =

Belarusian Soviet politician

Vasily Sharangovich

Vasily Fomich Sharangovich (Russian: Васи́лий Фоми́ч Шаранго́вич; Belarusian: Васіль Фаміч Шаранговіч, Vasil Sharanhovich; March 4, 1897 – March 15, 1938) was a Belarusian Soviet politician and the first secretary of the Communist Party of Byelorussian SSR in the Soviet Union. He was executed after the last of the Moscow Trials, the Trial of the Twenty-One, in 1938.

== Biography ==
Vasily Sharangovich was born into a peasant family in Vilna province, in modern-day Lithuania. He worked as a manual labourer. He joined the Bolsheviks in December 1917, after they had seized power, and enlisted in the Red Army. In 1919, he was sent to work underground in Minsk province, which was under Polish occupation. Arrested by Polish intelligence in 1920, he was sentenced to death, but his sentence was commuted to 10 years in prison. He was released after 18 months as part of a prisoner exchange.

Sharangovich was Deputy People's Commissar for Justice in the Byelorussian Soviet Socialist Republic in 1921–23. In 1923–30, he was a trade union official in Byelorussia (Belarus) and in Siberia. In 1930–34, he was Second Secretary of the Byelorussian Communist Party. In 1934–36, he was a party official in Kazakhstan and Kharkiv.

Sharangovich was appointed First Secretary of the Byelorussian communist party on 17 March 1937, and initiated the mass arrests of local officials who had been resisting the Great Purge, including the head of government, Nikolai Goloded, who died while under interrogation, and the Chairman of the Executive of the Supreme Soviet (i.e. 'President'), Alexander Chervyakov. Chervyakov heard himself denounced by Sharangovich during the 16th Congress of the Byelorussian party, in June 1937, left the hall, and committed suicide. Sharangovich described it as "a dog's death for a dog". He told the Congress:

We must destroy to the end the remnants of the Japanese-German and Polish spies and saboteurs, the remnants of the Trotskyist-Bukharin gang and the nationalist carrion, crush and grind them to powder, no matter how they disguise themselves, no matter what hole they hide in.

Despite his zealotry, Sharangovich was removed from office in August 1937, when Yakov Yakovlev was sent from Moscow to denounce and replace him. He was then forced to confess that he had been a Polish spy since 1921, a member of a 'national fascist' gang that included his former victims, Goloded and Chervyakov, and one of the 'Trotskyist-Bukharin gang' that he had denounced. In March 1938, he appeared in the third of the Moscow show trials, where Nikolai Bukharin was the principal defendant, and testified that Bukharin had been a spy. Bukharin denied it, called Sharangovich an agent provocateur, and said that he had never heard of him until he read his testimony. At that point, Sharangovich shouted at Bukharin to "stop lying!" Despite all the help he gave the authorities, he was sentenced to death, and shot—his last words were:

I felt the nightmare of the treacherous, treacherous crimes committed by me against the Soviet union, and the Soviet country, anyone like me should be crushed by its power.

Sharangovich was rehabilitated in 1958.
