= Dmitry Shmidt =

- Native name: Дмитрий Аркадьевич Шмидт
- Born: David Aronovich Gutman; August or 19 December 1896; Pryluky, Poltava Governorate, Russian Empire
- Died: 19 June 1937 (aged 40) Moscow, Soviet Union
- Allegiance: Russian Empire; Soviet Union
- Branch: Imperial Russian Army; Red Army
- Service years: 1915–17; 1918–37
- Rank: Komdiv
- Commands: 37th Rifle Division 2nd Red Cossacks Division; 1st Red Cossacks Division; 7th Cavalry Division 8th Mechanized Brigade
- Conflicts: World War I Russian Civil War
- Awards: Order of the Red Banner (2); Cross of St. George 1st, 2nd, 3rd, and 4th classes

Dmitry Arkadievich Shmidt (Russian: Дмитрий Аркадьевич Шмидт; born David Aronovich Gutman (Russian: Давид Аронович Гутман; August or 19 December 1896 – 19 June 1937) was a Red Army komdiv. Shmidt became a revolutionary before World War I and was imprisoned. He was drafted into the Imperial Russian Army at the beginning of 1915 and fought in World War I. Shmidt became a Full Cavalier of the Cross of St. George and an officer. After the February Revolution he led the Bolsheviks in his divisional committee. Shmidt joined the Red Army and fought in the Russian Civil War, initially as a partisan. He was awarded the Order of the Red Banner for his actions. After the end of the war he held command positions in cavalry units. He became commander of the 8th Mechanized Brigade in 1934. In 1936, Shmidt was one of the first Red Army officers to be arrested in the Great Purge, and was executed a year later. He was posthumously rehabilitated in 1957.

== Background ==
Shmidt was born in August or on 19 December 1896 in Pryluky. He was the son of a poor Jewish shoemaker or an insurance clerk. His mother worked as a typesetter at a cigarette factory. Shmidt was homeschooled.

== Career ==
In his youth, Shmidt worked as a fitter and as a projectionist. He became a railroad construction worker. He took his alias in honor of the revolutionary Pyotr Schmidt. He was drafted into the Imperial Russian Army in January 1915. During the year he joined the Bolshevik Party. For his actions Shmidt was awarded the Cross of St. George in all four classes. In February 1916, he was made an officer. Shmidt was wounded three times and was a lieutenant and acting battalion commander at the end of the war. After the February Revolution, Shmidt spread Bolshevik propaganda among the soldiers of the Southwestern Front. He helped create and train Red Guard detachments. Shmidt led the Bolshevik faction in the committee of the 164th Infantry Division in the 12th Army Corps of the 7th Army. For revolutionary activity he was arrested and imprisoned in Mykolaiv until October 1917. During the October Revolution, he joined the navy and became commander of shock troops. However, the fleet virtually ceased to exist because of the armed forces' collapse.

=== Russian Civil War ===
Shmidt joined the Red Army in 1918. He fought in the Russian Civil War. Shmidt served as commandant in Pryluky from January, attempting to establish Soviet power there. At one point, he was captured by anti-Soviet Ukrainians and was sentenced to death. He was wounded instead of being killed and during the German-Austrian occupation of Ukraine led the Bolshevik underground. In the fall of 1918 Shmidt formed a partisan group in the Pryluky area. The group became the 7th Sudzhansky (later 5th Soviet) Regiment, which became part of the 37th Rifle Division. In February 1919 Shmidt became commander of the 2nd Brigade in the division. In March, he met Hungarian Communist Tibor Szamuely, who recommended that Shmidt lead an expedition to help the Hungarian Soviet Republic. However, the expedition was never made.

In April 1919 he took command of the 2nd Consolidated brigade of the 37th Rifle Division. On 19 October 1920 Shmidt was awarded the Order of the Red Banner for his actions in capturing Rylsk, and the Liubotyn rail junction near Kremenchuk during the Red Army's crossing of the Dnieper. The award citation also mentioned the capture of Kryukovo. During heavy fighting near Shepetivka with Symon Petliura's army, Shmidt, according to the citation, had been seriously wounded but remained in the battle, personally operating guns against an armored train. In August 1919 Shmidt became chief of the VOHR's Yaroslavl district. He then became acting commander of the 37th Rifle Division. In November, he led the brigade in fighting at Tsaritsyn during the Armed Forces of South Russia's retreat. On 19 November Shmidt personally led the brigade in defeating White units. On 24 November his unit operated in the White rear and almost entirely captured the White Grenadier Division. On 29 November during the attack at Tsaritsyn, Shmidt was wounded but stayed in the battle. After being wounded a second time he was evacuated. In 1920 Shmidt became commander of the forces at Kherson. At the end of 1920 he became a student in a course at the Academy of the General Staff. At this time he met Alexander Barmine, who later defected. On 25 June 1921 Shmidt was awarded a second Order of the Red Banner for his actions at Tsaritsyn.

=== Interwar ===
In 1921 Shmidt was awarded a second Order of the Red Banner. In May, he became chief of staff of the 17th Cavalry Division, fighting against units of the remnants of the Ukrainian People's Army and capturing Ilintsy. Between 1922 and 1923, he studied at the Higher Academic Courses of the Military Academy of the Red Army. Shmidt was commander and commissar of the 2nd Red Cossacks Division was then acting commander of the 1st Red Cossacks Division between 1923 and 1924. In August 1924 he became commander of the 5th Ukrainian Cavalry School. In August 1926 Shmidt became commander and commissar of the 7th Samara Cavalry Division. Shmidt was relieved of command of the division after shooting an officer who insulted his wife in the stomach, and in May 1927 became head of the North Caucasian Mountain Nationalities Cavalry School. He visited Moscow at the time of the expulsion of the Trotskyites and met Stalin walking out of the Kremlin. According to Alexander Barmine, a friend of Shmidt, who heard the story second hand:

Shmidt went up to him and, half-joking, half-serious" manner began to blackguard him as only an old soldier can – that is, in terms that have to be heard to be believed. As he finished, he made a gesture as though to draw his sabre and told the Secretary General that one day he'd lop his ears off. Stalin listened without saying a word, but his face was dead white and his lips were drawn in a tight line. For the time being, he chose to treat Shmidt's insult as beneath contempt.

In 1928 Shmidt graduated from the Higher Officers' Improvement Courses (KUVNAS) at the Frunze Military Academy. From May 1930, he was deputy chief of staff of the North Caucasus Military District. He helped suppress revolts by the Karachays. Between 1931 and 1933 Shmidt was as a student in the Special Group of the Frunze Military Academy, after which he became commander and commissar of the 2nd Mechanized Brigade. From February 1934 Shmidt was commander and commissar of the 8th Mechanized Brigade. On 26 November 1935 he was promoted to Komdiv. In May 1936 he was recommended for an award of the Order of Lenin and for appointment as commander of the Automobile and Tank Directorate of the Leningrad Military District.

=== Great Purge and death ===
During the Zinoviev Case, Sergei Mrachkovsky accused Shmidt of terrorism. Shmidt was arrested on 6 or 9 July 1936. He was accused of conspiring to assassinate Kliment Voroshilov and preparing to use the 8th Mechanized Brigade to overthrow Soviet power in Kiev. On 1 June 1937, after months of interrogation, he confessed to being part of a "Military-Trotsykite Center" conspiring to assassinate Voroshilov and "wrecking" his brigade. Shmidt named B. Kuzmichev, Mikhail Zyuk, Vitaly Primakov, and Semyon Turovsky as members of the conspiracy. He identified Mikhail Tukhachevsky, Ieronim Uborevich, Innokenty Khalepsky, and Iona Yakir as leaders of the conspiracy. On 19 June 1937 he was sentenced to death, charged with involvement in a military conspiracy. Shmidt retracted his confession during the trial. He was executed on the same day, one of the first Red Army officers to die in the Great Terror. On 6 July 1957, Shmidt was rehabilitated.

== Personal life ==
Shmidt married twice: first to Valentina, and second to Alexandra Konstantinova, whom he married in 1933. In 1935 his daughter Sashenka was born. Alexander Barmine, his fellow pupil at military college, remembered Shmidt as "absolutely brave, very simple and very determined, given to mockery and to spells of almost childish sentimentality."

== Legacy ==
Shmidt's demise is one of several deaths by purge that influenced Whittaker Chambers to defect from the Soviet underground during 1937–1938:

In 1935 or 1936, I chanced to read in the press a little item of some nine or ten lines, perhaps less. The story said that Dmitri Schmidt, a general in the Red Army, had been sentenced and shot in Russia. I have forgotten whether it said "for treason." I had never heard of Dmitri Schmidt before. I still do not know anything more about him. He is a ghost who appeared to my mind a few hours after his death, evoked by a few lines of type.
I do not know why I read and reread this brief obituary or why there came over me a foreboding, an absolute conviction: Something terrible is happening. I felt this so strongly that I mentioned the item to J. Peters, the head of the underground section of the American Communist Party. He did not answer me at once. Then he said fiercely: "A comrade who has just come back from Moscow is going around saying that there is a terror going on there and that they are arresting and shooting everybody. He should be taken care of." This was Peters' way of saying that I should shut up. Then I knew that my foreboding was right.
The little item about Dmitri Schmidt meant, of course, that the Great Purge had reached the Red Army.

(NOTE: Chambers is off by a year or so on the year of Shmidt's death.)
