= Vasily Reshetnikov =

Soviet pilot (1919–2023)

- Василий Васильевич Решетников
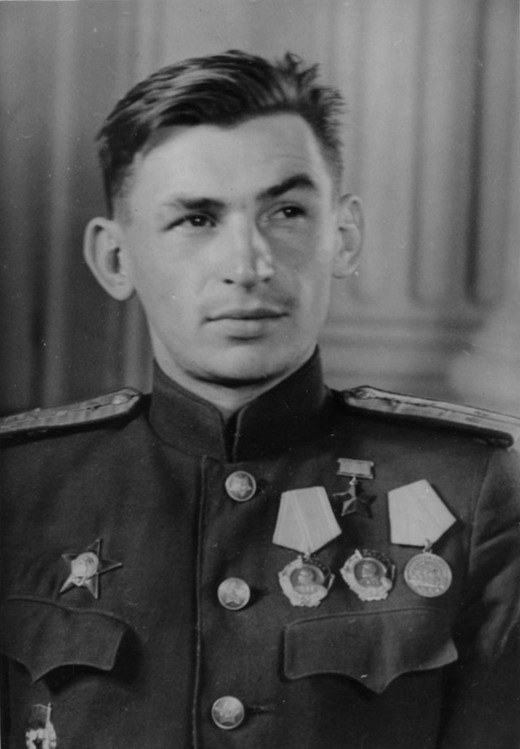
- Reshetnikov in 1943
- Born: 23 December 1919; Katerynoslav, Ukrainian SSR
- Died: 20 March 2023 (aged 103); Moscow, Russia
- Burial place: Federal Military Memorial Cemetery
- Military career
- Allegiance: Soviet Union
- Branch: Soviet Air Force
- Service years: 1936–1986
- Rank: Colonel General
- Conflicts: World War II
- Awards: Hero of the Soviet Union

Vasily Vasilyevich Reshetnikov (Russian: Василий Васильевич Решетников; 23 December 1919 – 20 March 2023) was a Soviet pilot who served during World War II. Reshetnikov flew 307 missions, mainly as a pilot of a long-range bomber, and in the summer of 1943, received the title of Hero of the Soviet Union. After World War II, he was named commander of an Aviation Division, Air Corps. Reshetnikov was subsequently promoted to Colonel General and took command of the Long-Range Aviation branch from 1969 to 1980 and was made Deputy Commander-in-Chief of the Air Force of the Soviet Union from 1980 to 1986.

== Early life ==
Reshetnikov was born on 23 December 1919 in the city of Katerynoslav, to a family of hereditary artists and icon painters. His uncle was artist Fyodor Pavlovich Reshetnikov. In 1936, at the call from the Komsomol, he joined the Red Army. He graduated from the Voroshilovgrad Military Aviation School named after the Proletariat of Donbass in 1938. After graduation, he began serving in long-range aviation of the Soviet Air Forces.

== World War II ==
Following the outbreak of Operation Barbarossa in June 1941, he served in the 751st Separate Night Long-Range Bomber Regiment, which was tasked with striking at targets in the enemy's deep rear, while flying an Ilyushin Il-4 bomber. He became a member of the Communist Party of the Soviet Union in 1942.

At the end of May 1942, he took part in the bombing of a German command post in Angerburg. He also participated in the long-range bombing of Berlin on the night of 10 September 1942. He served as the squadron commander of the 19th Guards Long-Range Aviation Regiment, 8th Guards Long-Range Bomber Aviation Division and the 2nd Guards Long-Range Aviation Bomber Corps. On 27 July 1943, Reshetnikov was awarded the title of Hero of the Soviet Union by the decree of the Presidium of the Supreme Soviet.

Reshetnikov's plane was shot down twice. The first time was in February 1942, near the front line, when he bombed the Balbasovo Airfield near Orsha. When he was shot down the second time, it took more than a week for him to get out of the enemy's rear. In 1943, he took part in the liberation of his hometown from the German invaders.

Reshetnikov completed his 307th and last combat mission on 16 April 1945. He ended the war as deputy regiment commander.

== Post war ==
After the war, he was sent to study, and in 1946 he graduated from the accelerated course of the Air Force Academy in Monino. In the summer of 1946, he returned to the 183rd Guard Bomber Regiment in Uzyn, and was appointed its commander after replacing regiment commander A. Shaposhnikov, who in the early years of the war helped him master the skill of night flying. He commanded the regiment for 8 years. From January 1951 to December 1954, he served as commander of the 185th Guard Bomber Regiment in Poltava.

In 1954, at his own request and with the support of the Commander of Long-Range Aviation, Chief Marshal of Aviation Alexander Novikov, he became a student of the Higher Military Academy named after K. E. Voroshilov. He graduated from the academy in 1956, and was appointed to the position of division commander. In the spring of 1959, he set a new unofficial world record for the flight range of 17,150 kilometers within closed curve, surpassing the American record by 2,700 kilometers. He spent 20 hours at the helm.

He became the deputy commander, and from December 1957 to December 1960, he was the commander of the 106th Heavy Air Bomber Division in Uzyn, which consisted of Tu-95 strategic bombers. From 1960 to 1961, he served as deputy commander, and from June 1961 to September 1968, he served as commander of the 2nd Independent Heavy Bomber Aviation Regiment in Vinnytsia. From the years 1966 to 1971, he was a member of the Communist Party of Ukraine Audit Committee, and from 1963 to 1971 a deputy to the Supreme Council of the Ukrainian SSR for the 6th and 7th terms.

From September 1968 to January 1969, he was the deputy commander, and from January 1969 to November 1980, he was the commander of the USSR Long Range Aviation branch. From 1980 to 1986, he served as deputy commander-in-chief of the Soviet Air Force. He retired from active duty in 1986.

== Later life ==
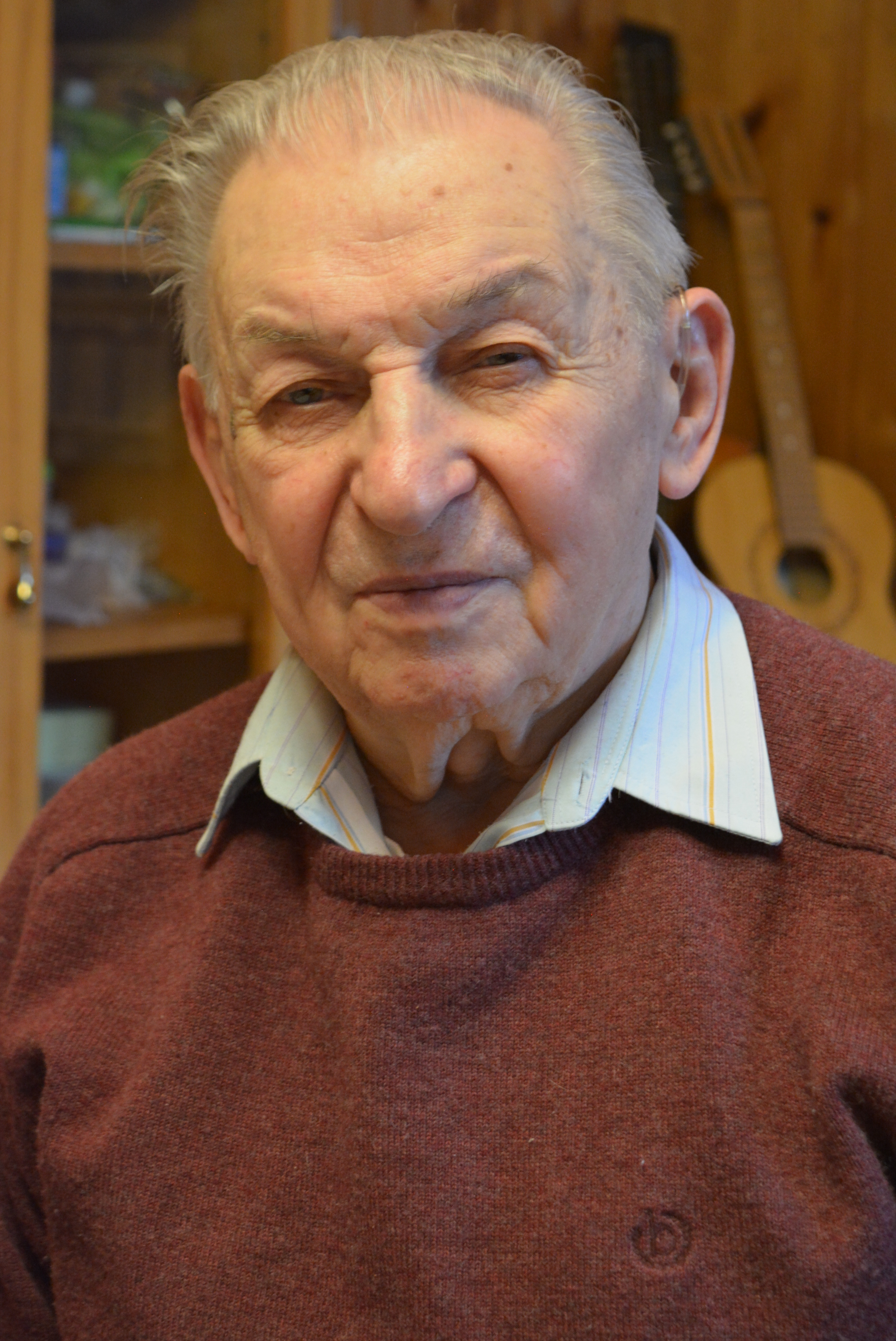
Vasily Reshetnikov in 2016

After his retirement, Reshetnikov lived in Monino. For more than 30 years, he actively participated in the Council of Veterans of Long-Range Aviation. For 10 years, he served as the chairman of this council and then as its honorary chairman. In 2003, at the age of 83, he flew a North American B-25 Mitchell bomber at the Monino Air Show. The aircraft was flown from Austria, by an Austrian pilot.

Reshetnikov turned 100 in December 2019. As of July 2021, he was the last of the living Heroes of the Soviet Union who flew the Il-4. He died on 20 March 2023, at the age of 103. He was buried with military honours at the Federal Military Memorial Cemetery's Pantheon of Defenders of the Fatherland on 23 March 2023.

== Dates of ranks ==
- Junior lieutenant: 12 December 1938
- Lieutenant: 13 April 1942
- Senior lieutenant: 6 August 1942
- Captain: 10 March 1943
- Major: 28 February 1944
- Lieutenant colonel: 6 April 1945
- Colonel: 3 October 1953
- Major general: 25 May 1959
- Lieutenant general: 13 April 1964
- Colonel general: 29 April 1970

== Awards and honors ==
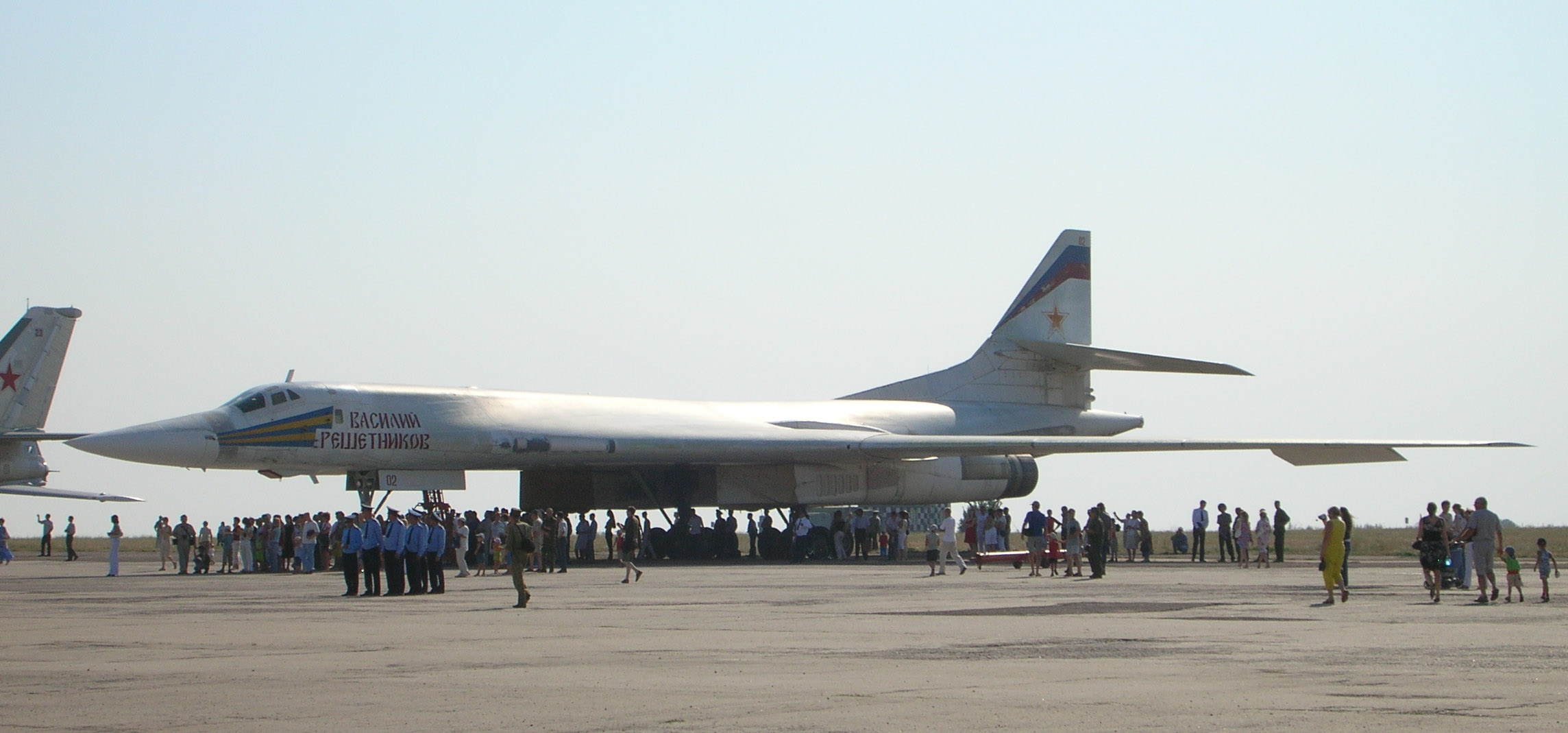
Russian Air Force Tu-160 supersonic strategic-bomber 'Vasily Reshetnikov'

USSR

- Hero of the Soviet Union (27 July 1943)
- Order of Lenin, thrice (31 December 1942, 27 July 1943, 22 February 1955)
- Order of the October Revolution (8 January 1980)
- Order of the Red Banner, thrice (28 April 1944, 10 December 1956, 22 February 1968)
- Order of Alexander Nevsky (6 April 1945)
- Order of the Patriotic War, 1st class (11 March 1985)
- Order of the Red Star, twice (29 March 1942, 19 November 1951)
- Order "For Service to the Homeland in the Armed Forces of the USSR", 3rd class (30 April 1975)
- Medal "For Battle Merit"
- Medal "For the Defence of Moscow" (1 May 1944)
- Medal "For the Defence of Leningrad" (22 December 1942)
- Medal "For the Defence of Stalingrad" (22 December 1942)
- Medal "For the Capture of Budapest" (9 June 1945)
- Medal "For the Capture of Königsberg" (9 June 1945)
- Medal "For the Capture of Berlin" (9 June 1945)
- Medal "For the Victory over Germany in the Great Patriotic War 1941–1945" (9 May 1945)
- Jubilee Medal "Twenty Years of Victory in the Great Patriotic War 1941–1945" (1965)
- Jubilee Medal "Thirty Years of Victory in the Great Patriotic War 1941–1945" (1975)
- Jubilee Medal "Forty Years of Victory in the Great Patriotic War 1941–1945" (1985)
- Jubilee Medal "In Commemoration of the 100th Anniversary of the Birth of Vladimir Ilyich Lenin" (1969)
- Jubilee Medal "30 Years of the Soviet Army and Navy" (1948)
- Jubilee Medal "40 Years of the Armed Forces of the USSR" (1958)
- Jubilee Medal "50 Years of the Armed Forces of the USSR" (1968)
- Jubilee Medal "60 Years of the Armed Forces of the USSR" (1978)
- Jubilee Medal "70 Years of the Armed Forces of the USSR" (1988)
- Medal "Veteran of the Armed Forces of the USSR" (1976)
- Medal "For Strengthening of Brotherhood in Arms"
- Medal "In Commemoration of the 250th Anniversary of Leningrad" (1957)

Russia

- Order "For Merit to the Fatherland", IV class (22 December 1999)
- Order of Honour (12 April 2010)
- Medal of Zhukov
- Jubilee Medal "50 Years of Victory in the Great Patriotic War 1941–1945" (1993)
- Jubilee Medal "60 Years of Victory in the Great Patriotic War 1941–1945" (2004)
- Jubilee Medal "65 Years of Victory in the Great Patriotic War 1941–1945" (2009)
- Jubilee Medal "70 Years of Victory in the Great Patriotic War 1941–1945" (2013)
- Jubilee Medal "75 Years of Victory in the Great Patriotic War 1941–1945" (2019)
- Jubilee Medal "300 Years of the Russian Navy" (1996)
- Medal "In Commemoration of the 850th Anniversary of Moscow" (1997)
- Prize of the Government of the Russian Federation for significant contribution to the development of the Air Force (17 December 2012)

Foreign

- Order of 9 September 1944, 1st class (Bulgaria)
- Order of Military Merit (Mongolia)
- Officer's Cross of the Order of Polonia Restituta (Poland)
