= Ilya Starinov =

Soviet Soldier

- Илья Григорьевич Старинов
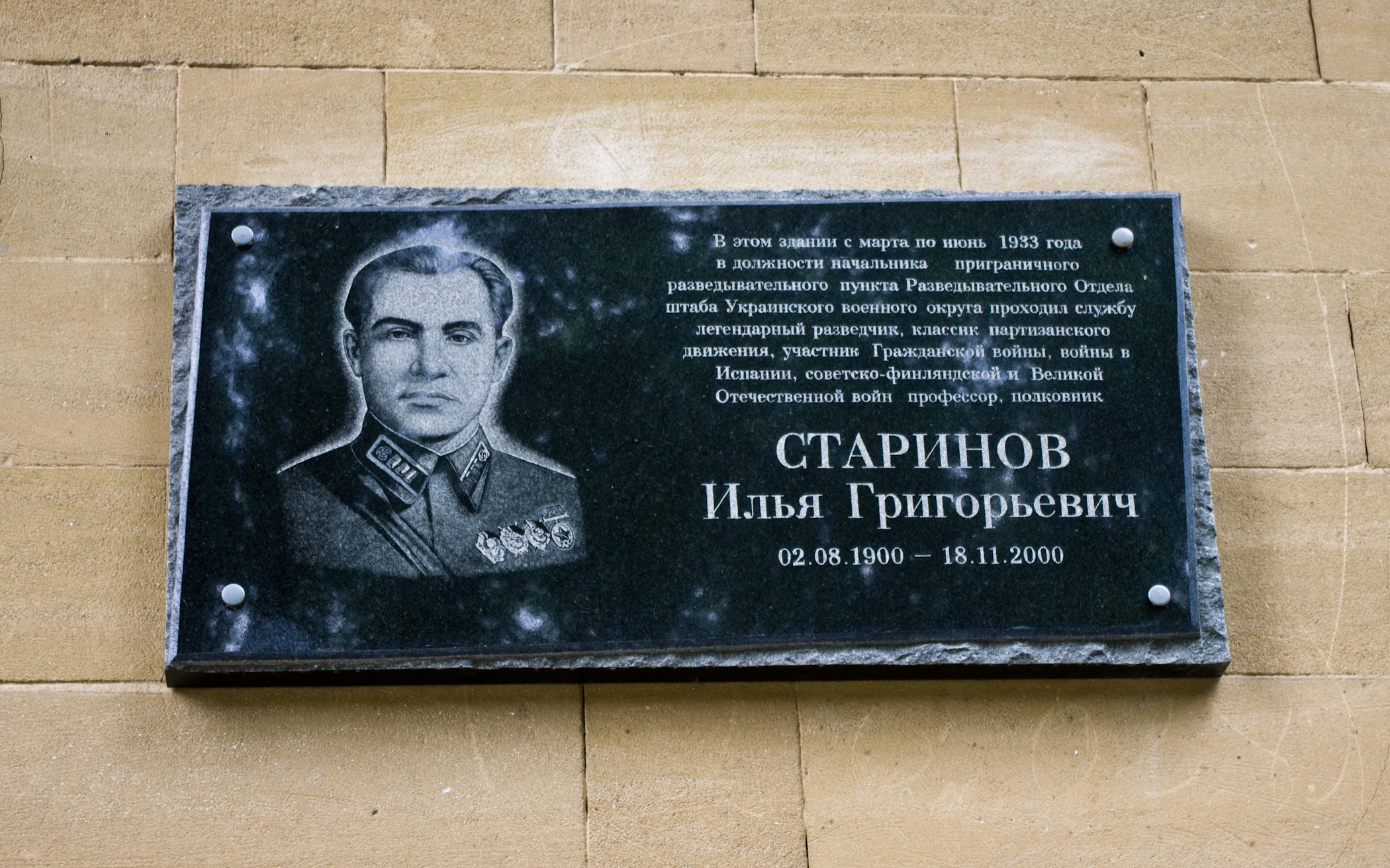
- Memorial plaque to Starinov in Tiraspol
- Born: 2 August [O.S. 20 July] 1900; Voinovo, Oryol Governorate, Russian Empire
- Died: 18 November 2000 (aged 100); Moscow, Russia
- Military career
- Branch: Soviet Army
- Service years: 1918–1956
- Rank: Colonel
- Nickname: Grandfather of Spetsnaz
- Conflicts: Russian Civil War; Spanish Civil War; World War II; Winter War; Eastern Front
- Awards: Order of Lenin (2x); Order of the October Revolution; Order of the Red Banner (5x); Order of the Patriotic War, 2nd Class; Order of Courage

Colonel Ilya Grigoryevich Starinov (Russian: Илья Григорьевич Старинов; 2 August [O.S. 20 July] 1900 – 18 November 2000) was a Soviet military officer, the most famous Soviet saboteur.

== Career ==
Starinov joined the Red Army in 1918 and participated in the Russian Civil War. In 1921 he attended a military college for railway troops and served with the Soviet railway troops in the 1920s. He joined the staff of the Ukrainian Military District in 1930 and took part in planning partisan warfare. In 1933 he was posted to Moscow and joined the staff of the GRU. In September 1933 he attended the Military Transport academy where he became acquainted with Mikhail Svechnikov.

He served with the Republican forces during the Spanish Civil War and was one of the leaders of the Soviet partisan movement during the Great Patriotic War of 1941–1945. He is known as the "grandfather of the Russian Spetsnaz".

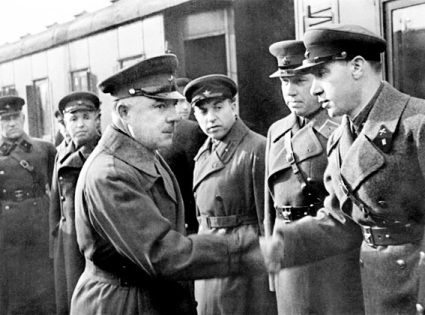
Starinov and Kliment Voroshilov shaking hands, 1937

The Russian military theorist Mikhail Svechnikov, executed by Stalin in 1938, had previously proposed the use of very well-trained forces in unequal combat situations. This idea was realised by Ilya Starinov. The two men thought similarly about the use of such forces.

The most famous sabotage operation of Colonel Ilya Starinov is the mining of the most important strategic objects with powerful high–explosive radio mines R-10 before the surrender of Kharkov by Soviet troops in the autumn of 1941, and then at the right time their remote detonation from Voronezh (distance from Kharkov is almost 300 km) by encoded radio signal. At that time, of all the armies in the world, only the Soviet Red Army was armed with powerful serial radio mines. The commander of the 68th Infantry Division, General Georg von Braun and many other senior German officers were killed under the ruins, and the work of the Kharkov transport hub was disorganized for a long time. This clandestine operation was so secret that until the early 60s it was mistakenly attributed to the activities of courageous Kharkov partisans.

During guerilla operations against the Nazis, Starinov captured a notebook from a Wehrmacht installation that detailed the progress the Germans had made on an atomic bomb.

In 1945 Starinov joined the military archive, but was moved to Lvov where he took part in the conflict with the Ukrainian nationalist insurgency. He held several staff posts after 1946, concentrating on developing insurgency tactics. Starinov retired from active service in 1956, but continued lecturing at military and KGB academies and took part in writing the official history of the partisan war. Being retired, Professor Ilya Starinov taught for many years at the Higher School of the KGB of the USSR.

The Rostov period of activity. Atomic notebook.

The Rostov period of Ilya Starinov's activity during the Second World War should be highlighted. Its importance for increasing the defense capability of the USSR was made public relatively recently. Rostov-on-Don is the "gateway to the Caucasus". In December 1941, a special operational engineering group of the Southern Front was formed under the leadership of Colonel Ilya Starinov to set up mine-explosive barriers on the approaches to the city. To protect Rostov, it was necessary to install about 70 thousand mines, 56 thousand of which were to be made in the city itself, for which Starinov was allocated experimental workshops of the Rostov State University. First of all, new types of mines were developed, capable of self-destruction at a set time and non-recoverable delayed-action mines. The mines were installed by former internationalist fighters of the Spanish Republican Army who arrived with Starinov, as well as Komsomol girls and teenagers of pre-conscription age. Every month, up to 15 thousand mines were taken from the workshops to the front, from which the advancing German army suffered heavy losses. In addition to the development, serial production of new types of mines and their installation on the approaches to the city, Starinov formed a special battalion in Rostov, whose sabotage groups regularly participated in the so-called "Ice campaigns" to the rear of the Germans on the ice of the Sea of Azov. They destroyed headquarters, seized captured documents and left their unique mines installed "as a souvenir" to the Germans.

On 23 February 1942, during one of the "Ice campaigns", Colonel Starinov's sabotage group under the leadership of foreman Maxim Repin seized the captured "atomic notebook" of the officer they killed. The murdered German turned out to be nuclear physicist Hans Vandervelde. Starinov handed the notebook to the office of the Commissioner of the USSR State Defense Committee for Science, Professor Sergey Kaftanov. The notebook contained formulas for the nuclear transformations of uranium and information on the development of the atomic bomb by the Germans. Ilya Starinov first openly described the operation of seizing the atomic notebook in January 1975 in a letter to the Rostov physicist Ivan Builo, with whom he was familiar from his work in the experimental workshops of the Rostov State University:

"... On the night of February 23, 1942, a raid was carried out on the enemy garrison of the Spit of the Curve on the northern coast of the Taganrog Bay. As a result of the raid, the garrison was destroyed, captured prisoners, trophies, including important documents. Petty officer Repin Maxim delivered a thick notebook among other documents… I asked those teachers of Rostov University who know German well to read it. There were a lot of formulas, graphs, diagrams in the notebook... When I left Rostov, I showed the notebook to Rodion Malinovsky, who advised me to hand it over to the office of the Commissioner of the USSR State Defense Committee for Science, Professor Sergey Kaftanov. With the consent of the chief of the engineering department, I did so. I handed it over to the responsible employee, Doctor of Chemical Sciences Stepan Balezin, and he found in it that the notebook was not a fantasy at all, but real judgments about the possibility of using atomic energy in military operations… Then it was decided to develop such weapons by us...".

The first official mention of the existence of the captured "atomic notebook" was announced only in 1985 in the memoirs of the former commissioner of the USSR State Defense Committee for Science, Professor Sergey Kaftanov, published in the media. Sergey Vasilyevich wrote that it was this "atomic notebook", along with the warning of physicist George Flerov, that prompted him and academician Abram Ioffe to contact the State Defense Committee with a letter about the urgent need to create a scientific center on nuclear weapons problems in the USSR. Kaftanov said that at the meeting of the State Defense Committee, where this proposal was considered, some key departments, including Gosplan, were against it. However, Joseph Stalin walked, walked and said: "We must do it." On 28 September 1942, Stalin signed an Order to resume work on the uranium program. The captured "atomic notebook" captured by Colonel Starinov's saboteurs became a "trigger hook" to the creation of atomic weapons in the USSR. Due to this, by the time Soviet intelligence received the drawings of the "Fat Man" bomb dropped on Nagasaki, the USSR had already created its own nuclear industry. This reduced the production time of the atomic bomb in the USSR to no less than two years.

== Honours and awards ==
- Two Orders of Lenin
- Order of the October Revolution
- Five Orders of the Red Banner
- Order of the Patriotic War 2nd class
- Order of Friendship of Peoples (Russian Federation)
- Order of Courage (Russian Federation)
- Medal of Zhukov (Russian Federation)
- Medal "Partisan of the Patriotic War" 1st class
- Medal "For Distinction in Guarding the State Border of the USSR"
- Medal "For the Defence of Stalingrad"
- Medal "For the Defence of Moscow"
- Medal "For the Defence of the Caucasus"
- Medal "For the Victory over Germany in the Great Patriotic War 1941–1945"
- Jubilee Medal "Twenty Years of Victory in the Great Patriotic War 1941-1945"
- Jubilee Medal "Thirty Years of Victory in the Great Patriotic War 1941-1945"
- Jubilee Medal "Forty Years of Victory in the Great Patriotic War 1941-1945"
- Medal "For Valiant Labour in the Great Patriotic War 1941-1945"
- Medal "Veteran of the Armed Forces of the USSR"
- Jubilee Medal "XX Years of the Workers' and Peasants' Red Army"
- Jubilee Medal "30 Years of the Soviet Army and Navy"
- Jubilee Medal "40 Years of the Armed Forces of the USSR"
- Jubilee Medal "50 Years of the Armed Forces of the USSR"
- Jubilee Medal "60 Years of the Armed Forces of the USSR"
- Jubilee Medal "70 Years of the Armed Forces of the USSR"
- Medal "In Commemoration of the 800th Anniversary of Moscow"
- Medal "In Commemoration of the 1500th Anniversary of Kiev"
- Jubilee Medal "50 Years of Victory in the Great Patriotic War 1941-1945" (Russian Federation)
