= Evgeny Ukhnalev =

Russian artist (1931–2015)

- Евгений Ильич Ухналёв
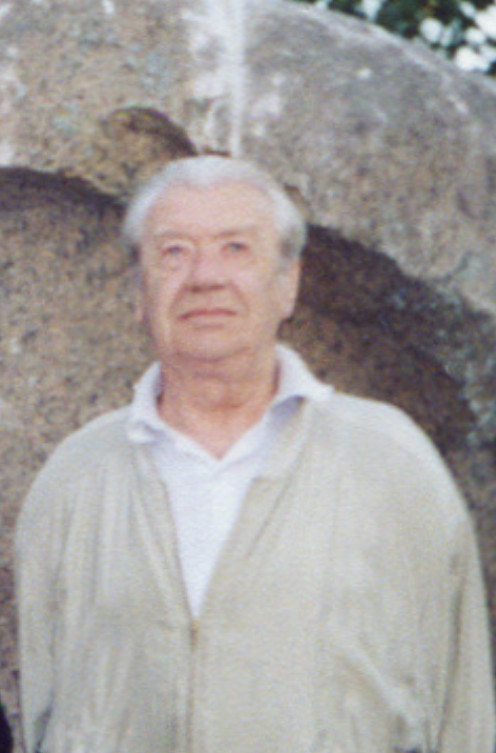
- Ukhnalyov in 2002
- Born: 4 September 1931; Leningrad, RSFSR, Soviet Union
- Died: 2 September 2015 (aged 83); Saint Petersburg, Russia
- Education: Repin Institute of Arts
- Known for: Painter, graphic artist, heraldist
- Awards: People's Artist of the Russian Federation; Jubilee Medal "50 Years of Victory in the Great Patriotic War 1941–1945"; Jubilee Medal "60 Years of Victory in the Great Patriotic War 1941–1945"; Jubilee Medal "65 Years of Victory in the Great Patriotic War 1941–1945"; Medal "In Commemoration of the 300th Anniversary of Saint Petersburg"

Evgeny Ilyich Ukhnalev (Russian: Евгений Ильич Ухналёв; 4 September 1931 – 3 September 2015) was a Russian contemporary artist and the honorary Russian state artist. He was a founding member of the Russian Guild of Heraldic Artists and the creator of many state symbols of modern Russia including its coat of arms. In 1997 he was awarded the People's Artist of Russia title.

== Biography ==
Ukhnalev was born in Leningrad (Saint Petersburg). He graduated from the visual arts school at Repin Institute of Arts in Leningrad and entered a Ship-Building Community College (судостроительный техникум). In 1948 Ukhnalev was accused of planning to dig an underground tunnel from Leningrad to Lenin's Mausoleum in Moscow to perform a terrorist act. Ukhnalev was sentenced to 25 years subject to article 58, he was kept in the Kresty, then in the Vorkutlag. He was sent to Vorkuta labor camps where he worked in coal mines. After 6 years, he was released because "when committing the crime" he wasn't 18 years old. Later he worked as a designer in a sharashka in Kresty Prison in Leningrad.

On 22 June 1954, a year after the death of Joseph Stalin, Ukhnalev was freed. He worked in a few design institutes, as well as did some book illustrations. In 1967 he found a job at the Hermitage Museum and soon became the chief architect of the museum. He worked there until 1975.

In 1992–1998 he worked for the State Heraldry at the President of Russia. Being on this position he designed many state symbols including:

- Modern Coat of arms of Russia (adopted 30 November 1993);
- The standard and the chain of the President of Russia;
- Reinstated Order of St. Andrew (adopted 1 July 1998);
- Order of Merit for the Fatherland 2nd class;
- Order of Courage;
- Official sign of the Governor of Saint Petersburg;
- Medal "In Commemoration of the 300th Anniversary of Saint Petersburg" and 60 Years since Lifting the Siege of Leningrad
- Honoured Craftsman of the Russian Federation
- Medal and diploma of the State Prize of the Russian Federation

and many others.

Since 1998 Ukhnalev has been working as the Leading Artist of the Hermitage Museum. As a painter he has participated in more than 40 exhibitions around the globe. His works are on display in the State Russian Museum in Anna Akhmatova museum and private collections.

Ukhnalev designed the Memorial to the Victim of Political Repressions in Petrograd - Leningrad on Troitskaya Square in Saint Petersburg. The memorial is also known as the Solovetsky Stone. The monument is actually a 10-tonne granite boulder taken 50 meters from the place of mass executions of the prisoners of Solovki prison camp. The rock is set on a polished granite base with inscriptions "To prisoners of GULAG", "To victims of Communist Terror", "To Freedom Fighters" and a line from the "Requiem" poem of Anna Akhmatova: "I wish to call all of them by name" (Хотелось бы всех поименно назвать...) The monument was unveiled 4 September 2002 in preparation for celebrations of 300 years of Saint Petersburg. According to Solvki Encyclopedia Ukhnalev and the architect of the memorial, State Duma deputy Yuly Rybakov, paid all the expenses personally including the transportation of the 10,400 kg boulder from the Solovetsky Islands in the White Sea. The Saint Petersburg city administration would not help financing the memorial despite significant budget allocated to celebrate the tercentenary of the city.

Evgeny Ukhnalev died in his home in Saint Petersburg on 3 September 2015, the day before his 84th birthday. He continued to work as a Hermitage Museum staff member until his death.

== Heraldic works and state awards ==
Coat of arms of Russia

Standard of the president of Russia

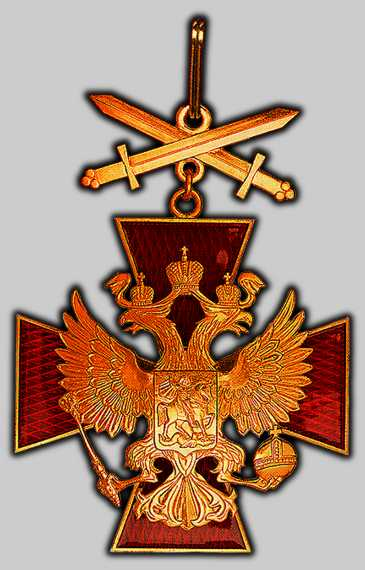
Order of Merits to the Fatherland

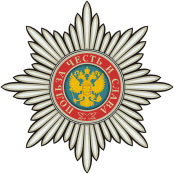
Star of Order of Merits to the Fatherland

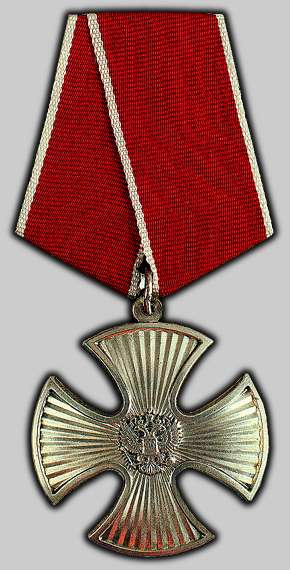
Order of Courage

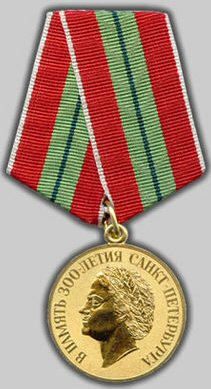
Medal 300 years of Saint Petersburg

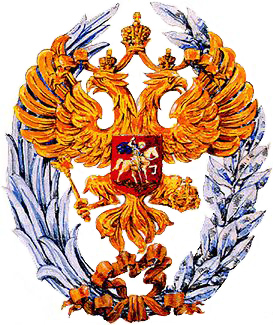
Medal of the State Prize of the Russian Federation

== Honours and awards ==
- Jubilee Medal "50 Years of Victory in the Great Patriotic War 1941-1945"
- Jubilee Medal "60 Years of Victory in the Great Patriotic War 1941-1945"
- Jubilee Medal "65 Years of Victory in the Great Patriotic War 1941-1945"
- Medal "In Commemoration of the 300th Anniversary of Saint Petersburg"
- People's Artist of the Russian Federation

== See also ==
- List of Russian artists

== Sources ==
- Popov, A. (2006). "Воркута – это святое" [Vorkuta is Sacred]. Argumenty i Fakty (in Russian).
- Racheva, Helen; Artemyeva, Anna (4 April 2012). ""58-я. Неизъятое" Евгений Ухналев. Миниатюры из "Крестов"" [Article 58: Eugene Ukhnalyov. Scenes from the Kresty]. Novaya Gazeta (in Russian). Moscow. ISSN 1682-7384.
