= Vram Dovlatyan =

Soviet Armenian chemist (1923-2005)

- Վռամ Դովլաթյան
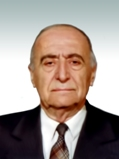
- Born: 13 July 1923; Gavar, Soviet Union, Armenian SSR
- Died: 25 December 2005 (aged 82); Yerevan, Armenia
- Citizenship: Soviet, Armenia
- Education: Yerevan State University
- Awards: Order of the Patriotic War (1985); Order of the Red Banner of Labour (2); Order of the Badge of Honour
- Scientific career
- Fields: chemical
- Workplaces: Armenian National Agrarian University

Vram Vaginaki Dovlatyan (Armenian: Վռամ Վաղինակի Դովլաթյան; August 13, 1923, Nor Bayazet - December 25, 2005, Yerevan) was a Soviet and Armenian organic chemist, Doctor of Chemical Sciences (1965), professor (1967), and Honored Scientist of the Armenian SSR (1980). He was also an Academician of the Academy of Sciences of the Armenian SSR (1994, corresponding member 1986). He is the elder brother of Frunze Dovlatyan.

== Biography ==
Vram Dovlatyan was born in Nor Bayazet. He participated in the Great Patriotic War and worked there as a coder at the headquarters. In 1949 he graduated from the Faculty of Chemistry of Yerevan State University.

Since 1954, he worked at the Department of General Chemistry of the Armenian Agricultural Institute, from 1958 to 1989 he served as head of the Department of General Chemistry.

From 1962 to 2005, he was the head of the Laboratory of Pesticide Problems at the same institute, and since 1962 he also headed the experimental laboratory for the synthesis of pesticides. Full member of the RAS since 1994.

New highly active herbicides, fungicides and growth stimulants discovered in the Dovlatyanovsky scientific laboratory are widely used in agriculture. He studied the reactions of chloromethoxymethylation of the ester acetic acid, the catalytic effect of quaternary ammonium salts on the formation of esters carbonic acid. Unique rearrangement reactions of chloralkox (thio, amine-sim-triazines) were discovered (in combination with the production of tara-sim-triazines).

== Works ==
Author of about 450 scientific works, including 130 copyright certificates. Based on his developments, 4 doctoral and 50 candidate dissertations were defended.

For 40 years he headed the department of general chemistry of the Armenian Agricultural Institute, now the State Agrarian University of Armenia. There he created a problematic laboratory for the synthesis and testing of pesticides, which he led until the end of his life.

- Author of many patents.
- Herbicides, antifungal agents and growth stimulants were obtained (crotilin, metazin, zulfazin, phenagon, alavin, etc.), some of which were invested in agriculture.
- Studied the reactions of chloromethoxymethylation of acetoacetic acid ester, the catalytic effect of quaternary ammonium salts on the formation of both esters of carboxylic acids.
- Discovered original rearrangement reactions of chloroalkoxy(thio,amino)-sym-triazines (conjugated to form tera-sym-triazines).
- The method for the synthesis of cyanamine-sim-trazines proposed by Dovlatyan is patented in Germany, Japan, and Switzerland.
- Included in the list of 500 influential leaders in the field of world science.
- Dovlatyan managed to solve the problem of effective disposal of waste chloroprene rubber - 1,3-dichlorobutene-2, on the basis of which he obtained the herbicide crotiline, which is widely used.

== Awards ==
- Soviet Union
  - Order of the Patriotic War, 2nd class
  - Order of the Red Banner of Labour (2)
  - Order of the Badge of Honour
  - Honored Scientist of the Armenian SSR
  - Jubilee Medal "In Commemoration of the 100th Anniversary of the Birth of Vladimir Ilyich Lenin"
  - Jubilee Medal "Twenty Years of Victory in the Great Patriotic War 1941–1945"
  - Jubilee Medal "Thirty Years of Victory in the Great Patriotic War 1941–1945"
  - Jubilee Medal "70 Years of the Armed Forces of the USSR"
  - Medal "Veteran of Labour"
- Armenia
  - Jubilee Medal "50 Years of Victory in the Great Patriotic War 1941–1945"
  - Jubilee Medal "60 Years of Victory in the Great Patriotic War 1941–1945"
  - Anania Shirakatsi Medal
  - Voted Person of the Year 1997 by the American Biographical Institute.
  - American Biographical Institute title "Man of the Century".
