= Ivan Ladyga =

Soviet-Russian colonel of artillery

Ivan Ladyha
- Іван Ладига
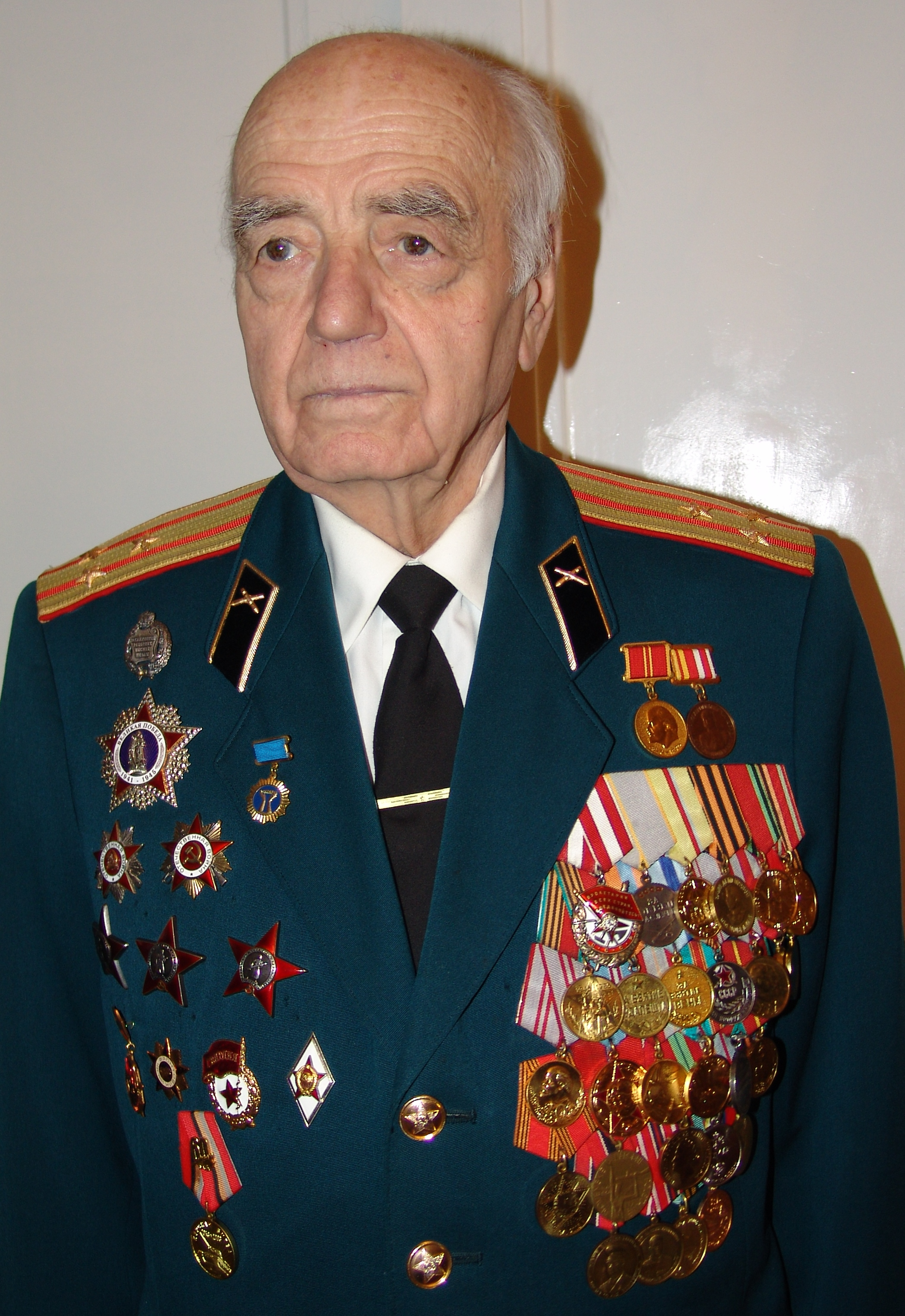
- Ladyga in 2006

Personal details
- Born: 17 November 1920 Manuylivka, Kherson Governorate, Ukrainian SSR, RSFSR (now Kirovohrad Oblast, Ukraine)
- Died: 11 January 2010 (aged 89) Saint Petersburg, Russia
- Awards: Order of the Red Banner; Order of the Red Star (3)

Military service
- Allegiance: Soviet Union; Russia
- Rank: Colonel of Artillery
- Battles/wars: World War II

Ivan Fedorovich Ladyga (Ukrainian: Ладига Іван Федорович; 17 November 1920 – 11 January 2010) was a Soviet-Ukrainen colonel of artillery. He was a Candidate of Military Sciences, a professor, and a corresponding member of the Russian Military Sciences Academy. He was given the award of Honoured Worker of Higher Education of the Russian Federation, and a veteran of World War II Ladyga was one of the authors of the Soviet doctrine for using Strategic Missile Troops in combat. Born in 1920 in the village Manuylivka, USSR.

== War service ==
In 1941 he graduated from the Kharkov School of Artillery. He participated in many battles of World War II from 22 June 1941. In the early days of the war, as a platoon commander (Lieutenant) of a 45-mm antitank gun battery (in the 173rd individual anti-tank battalion of the 27th Rifle Corps), his unit repelled the attack of Guderian's Panzer Army against the city of Lutsk, and against the town of Torchin on 24 and 25 June where his squad destroyed five enemy tanks. During July 1941 he took part in the defensive battles of the 5th Army during the withdrawal towards Korosten and Kiev. In the fighting near Kiev, he was injured by shrapnel and evacuated to a field hospital in Poltava.

After discharge from the hospital, he was appointed commander of a platoon of 45mm antitank guns in the 1049th Infantry Regiment, 300th Infantry Division. In September and October 1941 he participated in the battles for Kharkov. In the region west of Kharkov, in a fight for a chain of farms, he was seriously wounded and was sent to a hospital in Stalingrad.

In 1942 in Moscow, he graduated from a short-term reconnaissance course. In April 1943, he was a senior aide to the chief of intelligence of the 18th Guards Rifle Corps of the 13th Army of the Central Front in the Battle of Kursk where he was involved in the defensive battles in the area west of Station Ponyri, the counterattack at Sevsk, Konotop, and Priluki. From October to November 1943, he took part in the crossing of the Dnieper River and in the liberation of Kiev. In November 1943, now a Captain, as Assistant Chief of Operations on the staff of the Infantry Corps, he led a group of scouts taking an active part in ensuring the withdrawal of the 8th Infantry Division from encirclement near a settlement of thick woods west of Chernobyl. He commanded the same group of scouts, with partisans of General AN Polesie Saburov of the 18th Guards Rifle Corps, in the assault and liberation of Yelsk.

In February 1944 near Shepetovka, the reconnaissance units under his command infiltrated through enemy lines and captured six Germans who gave valuable information. In 1984, for his courage and heroism in this battle, he was awarded the title of "Honorary Citizen of Shepetovka".

During 1944–1945, as part of the 18th Guards Rifle Corps, he was appointed to the post of chief of operations of the Staff of the Infantry Division liberating Izyaslav, Ternopil, Stanislav, Staryi Sambir, Uzhgorod and Bucharest, he was particularly involved in the heavy fighting during the assault on Budapest, in the repelling of enemy armoured counter-attacks in the area of Székesfehérvár and in the capture of Vienna.

Ivan Ladyga ended the war in the Alps after the capture of Scheibbs, the war in Eastern Europe ended the following day, 9 May 1945.

== Post war service ==
In 1949 he graduated with a gold medal from the M. V. Frunze Military Academy in Moscow. From 1949 to 1953, he was a teacher at the FE Dzerzhinsky military academy. From 1954 to 1980, he was a Lecturer, Senior Lecturer, Deputy Head of Department, Associate Professor and Senior Fellow of the MI Kalinin Artillery Academy. From 1980 until his death, he served as Scientific Secretary of the dissertations council of the Mikhailovsky Artillery Academy.

== Honours and awards ==
- Order of the Red Banner
- Order of the Patriotic War 1st and 2nd class
- Three Orders of the Red Star
- Order of Honour (Russian Federation)
- Medal "For the Victory over Germany in the Great Patriotic War 1941–1945"
- Medal "For the Capture of Budapest"
- Medal "For the Capture of Vienna"
- Medal "For the Defence of Kiev"
- Medal of Zhukov (Russian Federation)
- Medal "Veteran of the Armed Forces of the USSR"
- Medal for Battle Merit
- Jubilee Medal "In Commemoration of the 100th Anniversary since the Birth of Vladimir Il'ich Lenin"
- Jubilee Medal "30 Years of the Soviet Army and Navy"
- Jubilee Medal "40 Years of the Armed Forces of the USSR"
- Jubilee Medal "50 Years of the Armed Forces of the USSR"
- Jubilee Medal "60 Years of the Armed Forces of the USSR"
- Jubilee Medal "70 Years of the Armed Forces of the USSR"
- Medal "200 Years of the Ministry of Defence" (Min Def Russian Federation)
- Medal "For Labour Valour"
- Jubilee Medal "Twenty Years of Victory in the Great Patriotic War 1941–1945"
- Jubilee Medal "Thirty Years of Victory in the Great Patriotic War 1941–1945"
- Jubilee Medal "Forty Years of Victory in the Great Patriotic War 1941–1945"
- Jubilee Medal "65 Years of Victory in the Great Patriotic War 1941–1945" (Russian Federation)
- Jubilee Medal "60 Years of Victory in the Great Patriotic War 1941–1945" (Russian Federation)
- Jubilee Medal "50 Years of Victory in the Great Patriotic War 1941–1945" (Russian Federation)
- Medal "In Commemoration of the 300th Anniversary of Saint Petersburg" (Russian Federation)
- Medal "In Commemoration of the 1500th Anniversary of Kiev"
- Medal "For Impeccable Service" 1st, 2nd and 3rd classes
- Medal "Defender of the Motherland" (Ukraine)
- Honored Worker of Higher Education of the Russian Federation
