= Abasov =

Abasov is a surname. Notable people with the surname include:

- Ismat Abasov (born 1954), Azerbaijani politician
- Mazahir Abasov (1918–2002), Azerbaijani aviator
- Nijat Abasov (born 1995), Azerbaijani chess grandmaster
- Vahid Abasov (born 1997), Russian-born Serbian boxer
