= Medal "For Distinction in Guarding the State Border of the USSR" =

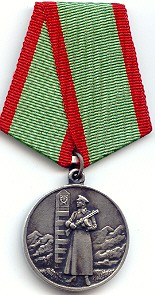
- Medal "For Distinction in Guarding the State Border of the USSR" (obverse)
- Type: Military medal
- Awarded for: Outstanding military deeds related to state frontier security
- Presented by: USSR
- Eligibility: Soviet border troops, servicemen and civilians
- Status: No longer awarded
- Established: July 13, 1950

Highlights
- Total: 67,000
- Ribbon of the Medal "For Distinction in Guarding the State Border of the USSR"

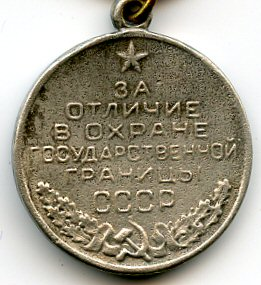
Reverse of the Medal "For Distinction in Guarding the State Border of the USSR"

The Medal "For Distinction in Guarding the State Border of the USSR" (Russian: Медаль «За отличие в охране государственной границы СССР») was a military decoration of the Soviet Union established to recognise outstanding deeds related to state frontier security by members of Soviet Border Troops, servicemen and civilians.

== Medal history ==
The Medal "For Distinction in Guarding the State Border of the USSR" was established on July 13, 1950 by Decree of the Presidium of the Supreme Soviet of the USSR. Its statute was amended on two occasions by further decrees of the Presidium of the Supreme Soviet of the USSR, firstly on March 18, 1977 and lastly on July 18, 1980.

== Medal statute ==
The Medal "For Distinction in Guarding the State Border of the USSR" was awarded to soldiers of Border Troops and other military personnel as well as to Soviet citizens for military exploits and special services displayed in the protection of the state borders of the USSR. More precisely:

- for bravery and selflessness displayed during combat operations aimed at the arrest of violators of the State Border of the USSR;
- for the leadership of border protection units while ensuring the inviolability of the borders of the USSR;
- for a high degree of vigilance and proactive actions which resulted in the arrest of violators of the State Border of the USSR;
- for the skilful organization of border service units and exemplary work to strengthen the borders of the USSR;
- for the excellent performance of military duties associated with the protection of the state borders of the USSR;
- for active assistance to border protection forces in their combat assignments aimed at the protection of the state borders of the USSR.

The Medal "For Distinction in Guarding the State Border of the USSR" was bestowed on behalf of the Presidium of the Supreme Soviet of the USSR by the Chairman of the Committee for State Security. It was worn on the left side of the chest and in the presence of other medals of the Soviet Union, immediately following the Medal "Partisan of the Patriotic War" 2nd class. When worn in the presence of orders and medals of the Russian Federation, the latter have precedence.

The Medal "For Distinction in Guarding the State Border of the USSR" awarded to those killed on duty or that have died, along with their relevant award certificates, are transferred to the families for safekeeping and as a memento.

== Medal description ==
The Medal "For Distinction in Guarding the State Border of the USSR" was a 32 mm in diameter circular medal with a raised rim on both sides. The medal was initially struck from silver, after 1966 it was constructed of silver-plated nickel and later of cupro-nickel. The obverse bore the relief image of an erect border guard holding a PPSh-41 submachine gun standing guard beside a border marker with high mountains in the background. The reverse bore a relief inscription on six lines "For Distinction in the Protection of the State Border of the USSR" (Russian: «За отличие в охране государственной границы СССР»), at the top, the relief image of a five pointed star, at the bottom, a relief hammer and sickle over laurel and oak branches.

The Medal "For Distinction in Guarding the State Border of the USSR" was secured by a ring through the medal suspension loop to a standard Soviet pentagonal mount covered by a 24 mm wide green silk moiré ribbon with 3 mm wide red edge stripes.

== Recipients (partial list) ==
The individuals below were all recipients of the Medal "For Distinction in Guarding the State Border of the USSR".

- Coast Guard Colonel General Viktor Trofimovich Trufanov
- East German Minister of State Security Erich Fritz Emil Mielke
- Marshal of the Soviet Union and Defence Minister Dmitriy Feodorovich Ustinov
- Major General cosmonaut Yury Nikolayevich Glazkov
- Marshal of the Soviet Union Dmitry Timofeyevich Yazov
- Marshal of the Soviet Union Sergey Fyodorovich Akhromeyev
- Marshal of the Soviet Union Sergei Leonidovich Sokolov
- Marshal of the Soviet Union Semyon Konstantinovich Kurkotkin
- Marshal of the Soviet Union Vasily Ivanovich Petrov
- Colonel Alexey Petrovich Maresyev
- Army General Ivan Ivanovich Fedyuninsky
- Army General Sagadat Kozhahmetovich Nurmagambetov
- Cosmonaut Colonel Boris Valentinovich Volynov
- Cosmonaut Colonel Yury Petrovich Artyukhin
- Cosmonaut Colonel Gennadi Vasiliyevich Sarafanov
- Cosmonaut Colonel Vitaly Mikhaylovich Zholobov
- Colonel Ilya Grigoryevich Starinov

== See also ==
- Soviet Border Troops
- Russian Federation Medal "For Distinction in the Protection of the State Borders"
