= Mazahir Abasov =

Azerbaijani historian (1918–2002)

Mazahir Abasov Məzahir Abasov
- Born: December 15, 1918; Mashtaga, Baku Uyezd, Azerbaijan Democratic Republic
- Died: February 2002 (aged 83); Baku, Azerbaijan
- Military career
- Allegiance: USSR
- Branch: Air force
- Rank: Lieutenant

Mazahir Hamid oghlu Abasov (Azerbaijani: Məzahir Həmid oğlu Abasov; December 12, 1918 – February 2002) was an aviator, doctor of historical sciences, professor, and laureate of the Shohrat Order.

== Biography ==
Mazahir Abasov was born on December 12, 1918, in Mashtaga.

From 1942, he worked in the Soviet and party organs of the city of Baku and districts of Azerbaijan. In 1955, he was elected a deputy of the Supreme Soviet of the Azerbaijan SSR and a member of the Baku Committee of the Azerbaijan Communist Party. From 1963, he worked at the Institute of History of the ANAS. Abasov was a doctor of historical sciences, professor at Azerbaijan State University, and author of a number of books devoted to the Great Patriotic War.

Abasov died in February 2002 in Baku.

== Great Patriotic War ==
In 1940, he graduated from Yeysk Flight School and was promoted to lieutenant commander of the flight crew of the 5th Air Squadron of the 2nd Mine-Torpedo Air Regiment of the 63rd Air Brigade of the Black Sea Fleet. Mazahir entered the war on the very first day as a pilot of the DB-3f long-range bomber. On August 31, 1941, he was seriously wounded during a combat mission and after long-term treatment in a hospital, he was discharged from the army in 1942.

== Memorial ==
On the 85th birth anniversary of Mazahir Abasov, the book "Legendary Pilot, Wise Man" was written in 2004, and on his 90th anniversary the book "Legendary Pilot Mazahir Abasov" was written in 2008. In 2014, ITV made a biographical film about Mazahir Abasov.

== Awards ==
- Shohrat Order — December 15, 1998
- Order of the Red Banner — August 14, 1942
- Order of the Patriotic War (1st degree) — April 6, 1985
- Medal "For the Defence of Odessa" — March 1, 1945
- Medal "For the Defence of Sevastopol" — March 1, 1945
- Medal "For the Defence of the Caucasus"
- Medal "Veteran of Labour"
- Medal "For the Victory over Germany in the Great Patriotic War 1941–1945"
- Jubilee Medal "Twenty Years of Victory in the Great Patriotic War 1941–1945"
- Jubilee Medal "Thirty Years of Victory in the Great Patriotic War 1941–1945"
- Jubilee Medal "Forty Years of Victory in the Great Patriotic War 1941–1945"
- Jubilee Medal "50 Years of the Armed Forces of the USSR"
- Jubilee Medal "70 Years of the Armed Forces of the USSR"
- Jubilee Medal "50 Years of Victory in the Great Patriotic War 1941–1945"
