= Medal "In Commemoration of the 1500th Anniversary of Kiev" =

Commemorative medal of the Soviet Union

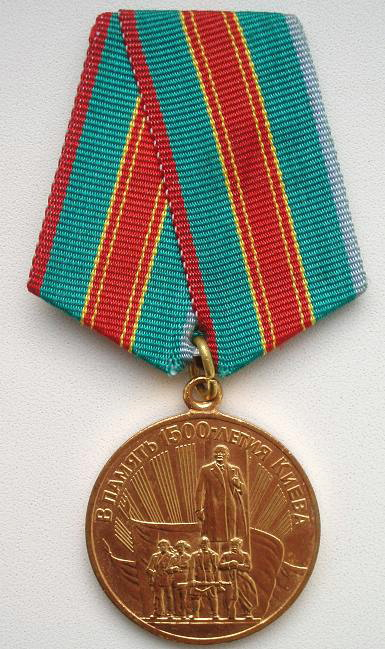
- Medal "In Commemoration of the 1500th Anniversary of Kiev" (obverse)
- Type: Commemorative medal
- Awarded for: Wartime and peacetime service to the city of Kiev
- Presented by: USSR
- Eligibility: Citizens of the Soviet Union
- Status: No longer awarded
- Established: May 10, 1982
- First award: May 26, 1982

Highlights
- Total: 780,180
- Ribbon of the Medal "In Commemoration of the 1500th Anniversary of Kiev"

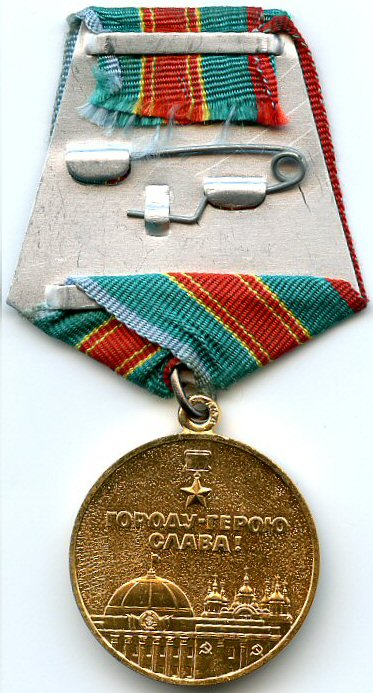
Reverse of the Medal "In Commemoration of the 1500th Anniversary of Kiev"

The Medal "In Commemoration of the 1500th Anniversary of Kiev" (Russian: Медаль «В память 1500-летия Киева», romanised: Medal' "V pamyat' 1500-letiya Kiyeva") was a state commemorative medal of the Soviet Union established by decree of the Presidium of the Supreme Soviet of the USSR on 10 May 1982 to commemorate the 1500th anniversary of the Hero City of Kiev.

== Medal Statute ==
The Medal "In Commemoration of the 1500th Anniversary of Kiev" was awarded to workers, to specialists of the national economy, to workers of science and culture, of government agencies and community organisations, to military personnel, to retirees and other individuals who contributed to the economic, social and cultural development of the city, if residents of Kiev or its suburbs for at least 10 years; to participants in the defence of Kiev during the Great Patriotic War (the name for World War II in 1941–45 in Russia), to veterans awarded the medal "For Defence of Kiev", to partisans and fighters of the underground who fought in Kiev and its vicinity, for participation in the liberation of the city as part of the Soviet Armed Forces, regardless of where they might now live.

The Medal "In Commemoration of the 1500th Anniversary of Kiev" was awarded by the executive committee of the Kiev City Council on behalf of the Presidium of the Supreme Soviet of the USSR.

The medal was worn on the left side of the chest and in the presence of other medals of the Soviet Union, was located immediately after the Medal "In Commemoration of the 250th Anniversary of Leningrad". If worn in the presence of medals and Orders of the Russian Federation, the latter have precedence.

== Medal description ==
The Medal "In Commemoration of the 1500th Anniversary of Kiev" was a 32mm in diameter circular brass medal. The obverse bears the relief image of deployed banners and divergent beams as a background to the Kiev monument of the Great October Revolution (dismantled in 1991). Along the upper circumference of the medal, the inscription: "In Commemoration of the 1500 Anniversary of Kiev" (Russian: «В память 1500-летия Киева»). On the reverse, in the upper part is an image of a "Gold Star" of Hero of the Soviet Union, just below it the inscription in two lines "GLORY TO THE HERO-CITY!" (Russian: «ГОРОДУ-ГЕРОЮ СЛАВА!»). In the lower part, the image of the building of the Supreme Soviet of the Ukrainian SSR, to its right, the image of the "Sophia Museum", an 11th-century cathedral converted to the anti-religious museum by the Soviet regime.

The medal is secured to a standard Russian pentagonal mount by a ring through the medal suspension loop. The mount is covered by a 24mm wide green silk moiré ribbon with a red 2mm left edge stripe, a blue 2mm right edge stripe and a central 8mm red stripe flanked by two 0,5mm wide gold edge stripes on each side spaced 1mm apart.

== Recipients (partial list) ==
The individuals listed below were recipients of the Medal "In Commemoration of the 1500th Anniversary of Kiev".

- Alexander Ivanovich Pokryshkin
- Ivan Khristoforovich Bagramyan
- Georgy Filippovich Baydukov
- Boris Evseyevich Chertok
- Boris Alexandrovich Rybakov
- Leonid Ilyich Brezhnev
- Mikhail Sergeyevich Gorbachev
- Ilya Grigoryevich Starinov
- Ivan Fedorovich Ladyga
- Iosif Davydovich Kobzon
- Vitaly Ivanovich Popkov

== See also ==
- Battle of Kiev (1941)
- Battle of Kiev (1943)
- City of Kiev
- Awards and decorations of the Soviet Union
