= Jubilee Medal "65 Years of Victory in the Great Patriotic War 1941–1945" =

Commemorative medal awarded by several post-Soviet countries

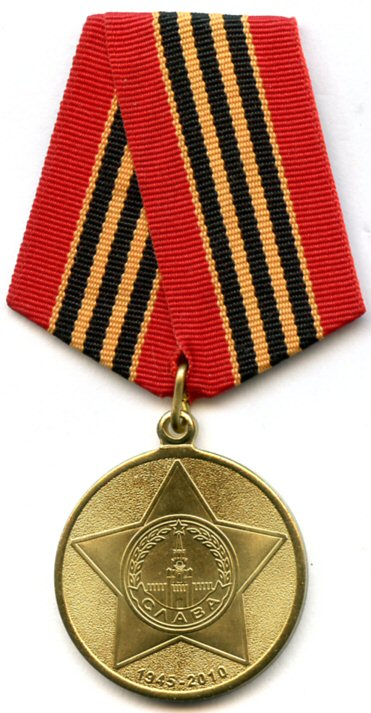
- Obverse of the Jubilee Medal "65 Years of Victory in the Great Patriotic War 1941–1945"
- Type: State commemorative medal
- Awarded for: Service during the Second World War
- Presented by: Russia; Ukraine; Belarus; Kazakhstan
- Eligibility: Citizens of the Russian Federation and foreign nationals
- Status: No longer awarded
- Established: March 4, 2009
- Ribbon of the Jubilee Medal "65 Years of Victory in the Great Patriotic War 1941–1945"

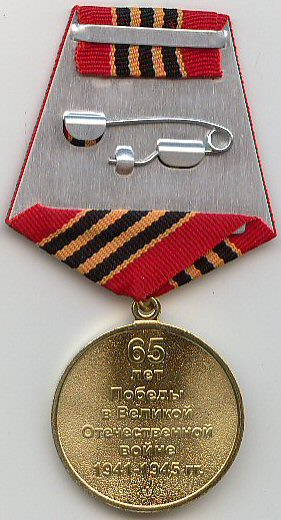
Reverse of the Jubilee Medal "65 Years of Victory in the Great Patriotic War 1941–1945"

The Jubilee Medal "65 Years of Victory in the Great Patriotic War 1941–1945" (Russian: Юбилейная медаль «65 лет Победы в Великой Отечественной войне 1941–1945 гг.») is a state commemorative medal of the Russian Federation. It was established on March 4, 2009, by Presidential Decree No. 238 to commemorate the 65th anniversary of the victory over Nazi Germany in 1945.

== Medal statute ==
The Jubilee Medal "65 Years of Victory in the Great Patriotic War 1941–1945" was awarded to a broad range of individuals in recognition of their contributions during the Second World War, specifically within the context of the Eastern Front, referred to in the former Soviet Union as the Great Patriotic War.

Recipients included:

- Soldiers and civilian personnel of the Armed Forces of the USSR who participated in hostilities from 1941 to 1945;
- Partisans and members of underground resistance movements operating in the German-occupied territories of the USSR;
- Individuals previously awarded the Medal "For the Victory over Germany in the Great Patriotic War 1941–1945" or the Medal "For the Victory over Japan";
- Civilians awarded for their wartime labor, including recipients of the Medal "For Valiant Labour in the Great Patriotic War 1941–1945", the Medal "For Labour Merit," or any of the medals for the defense of Soviet cities and regions;
- Civilians who worked for no less than six months between 22 June 1941 and 9 May 1945, excluding time spent in territories temporarily occupied by enemy forces;
- Former underage prisoners of Nazi concentration camps, ghettos, and other places of detention established by Nazi Germany and its allies;
- Foreign nationals from outside the Commonwealth of Independent States who served in national military forces aligned with the USSR, or participated in partisan units, underground groups, or other anti-fascist formations, and who had been awarded state honors by the USSR or the Russian Federation.

The medal was removed from the list of state awards of the Russian Federation by Presidential Decree No. 1099, issued on September 7, 2010. It is no longer awarded.

== Medal description ==
The Jubilee Medal "65 Years of Victory in the Great Patriotic War 1941–1945" is a circular medal made of red brass, measuring 32 mm in diameter.

The obverse features a relief image of the Order of Glory. Between the two lower rays of the star are the dates "1945 – 2010."

The reverse bears a relief inscription in seven lines that reads: "65 Years of Victory in the Great Patriotic War 1941 – 1945" (Russian: «65 лет Победы в Великой Отечественной войне 1941 – 1945 гг.»).

The medal is suspended by a ring through the suspension loop and attached to a standard Russian pentagonal mount. The mount is covered by a 24 mm wide silk moiré ribbon based on the Ribbon of Saint George, featuring red edge stripes 6 mm in width.

== Notable recipients (partial list) ==
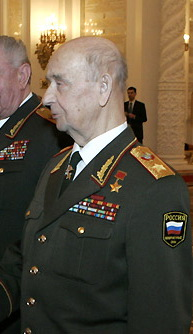
Marshal of the Soviet Union Sergei Leonidovich Sokolov, recipient of the Jubilee Medal "65 Years of Victory in the Great Patriotic War 1941–1945"

The following individuals were recipients of the Jubilee Medal "65 Years of Victory in the Great Patriotic War 1941–1945":

- Boris Tadić – President of Serbia
- Elina Bystritskaya – Actress
- Yevgeny Ukhnalyov – Former labor camp inmate, founding member of the Russian Guild of Heraldic Artists
- Vladimir Dolgikh – Politician and veteran of the Defence of Moscow
- Ivan Ladyga – Artillery officer, Colonel
- Vasily Ivanovich Petrov – Marshal of the Soviet Union
- Sergei Sokolov – Marshal of the Soviet Union
- Dmitry Yazov – Marshal of the Soviet Union
- Marina Salye – Geologist and politician, former deputy of the Legislative Assembly of Leningrad
- Ekaterina Mikhailova-Demina – World War II combat medic, Chief Petty Officer in the Soviet Marines
- Timofey Manaenkov – Captain 1st rank, veteran of the capture of Vienna
- Alexei Elagin – Major General, veteran of the defence of Sevastopol
- Ivan Sluhay – Major General, veteran of the Battle of Kursk
- Vasily Reshetnikov – Colonel General, veteran of the capture of Königsberg
- Vasilio Gorlanova – Veteran of the defence of Smolensk
- Nikolay Gorbachev – Veteran of the liberation of Leningrad and participant in the 1945 Moscow Victory Parade
- Nadezhda Popova – Veteran of the defence of the Caucasus

== Gallery of the first award ceremony ==
A selection of photographs from the first award ceremony held at the Kremlin on December 4, 2009, during which selected veterans of the Great Patriotic War were presented with the Jubilee Medal "65 Years of Victory in the Great Patriotic War 1941–1945".

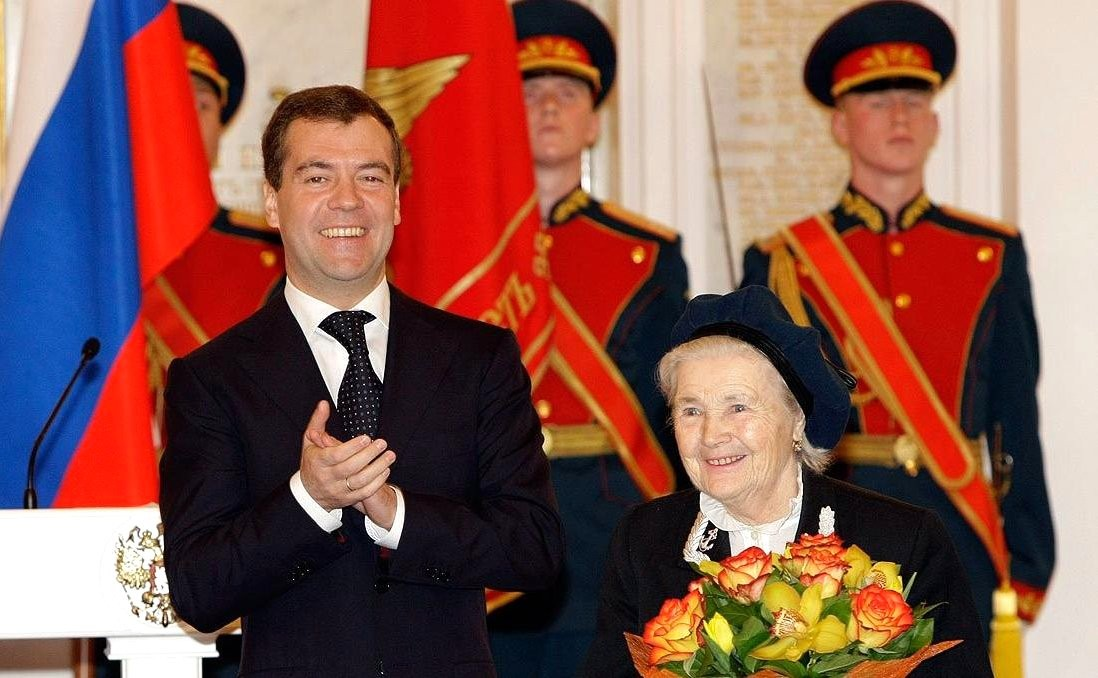
Chief Petty Officer Ekaterina Mikhailova-Demina

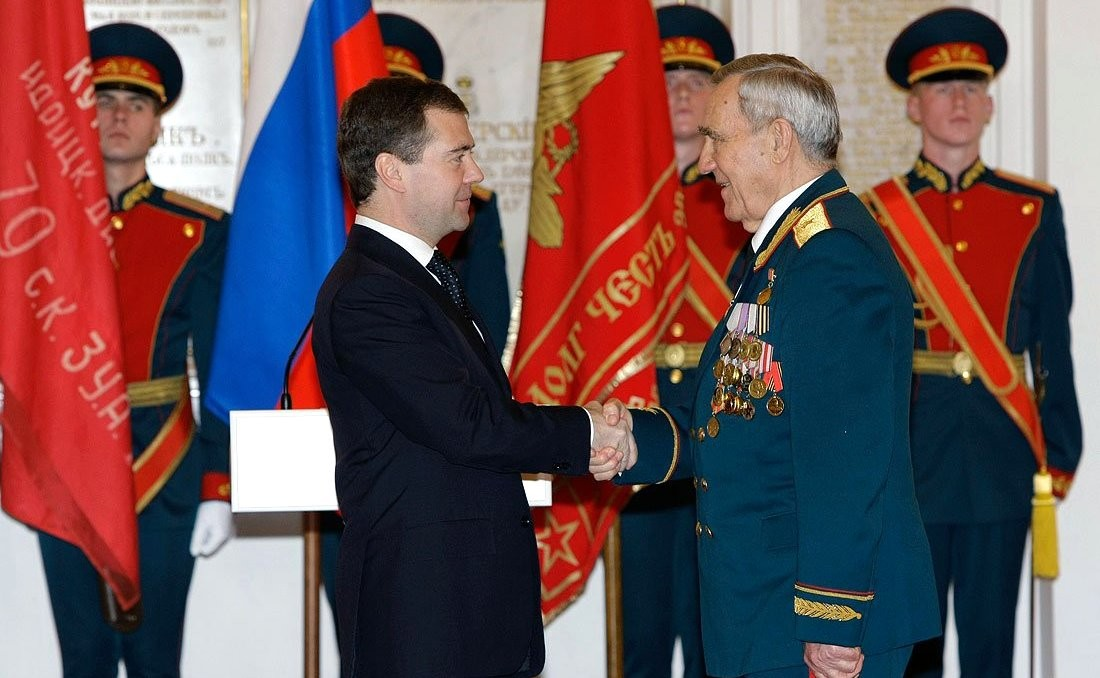
Major General Alexei Elagin

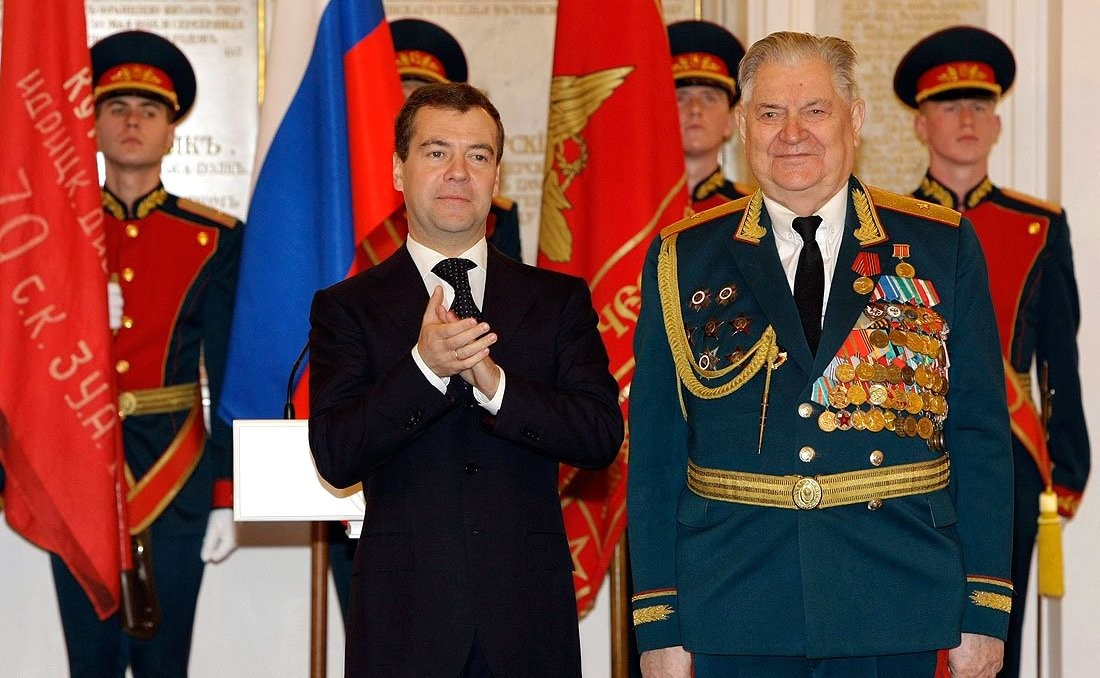
Major General Ivan Sluhay

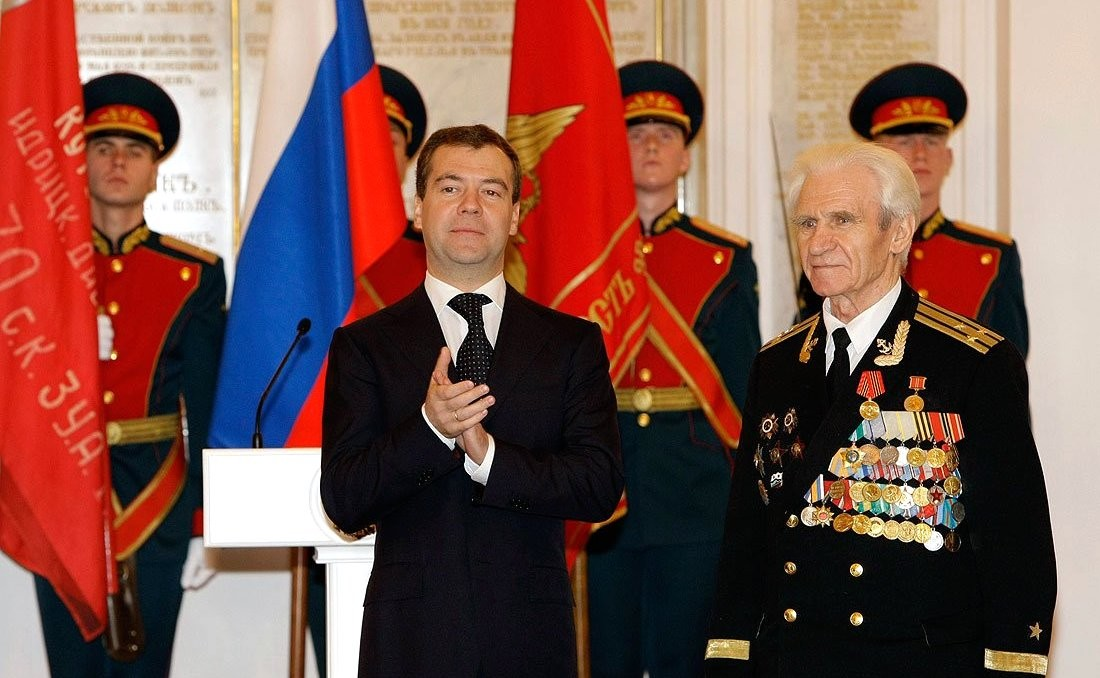
Captain 1st grade Timofey Manaenkov

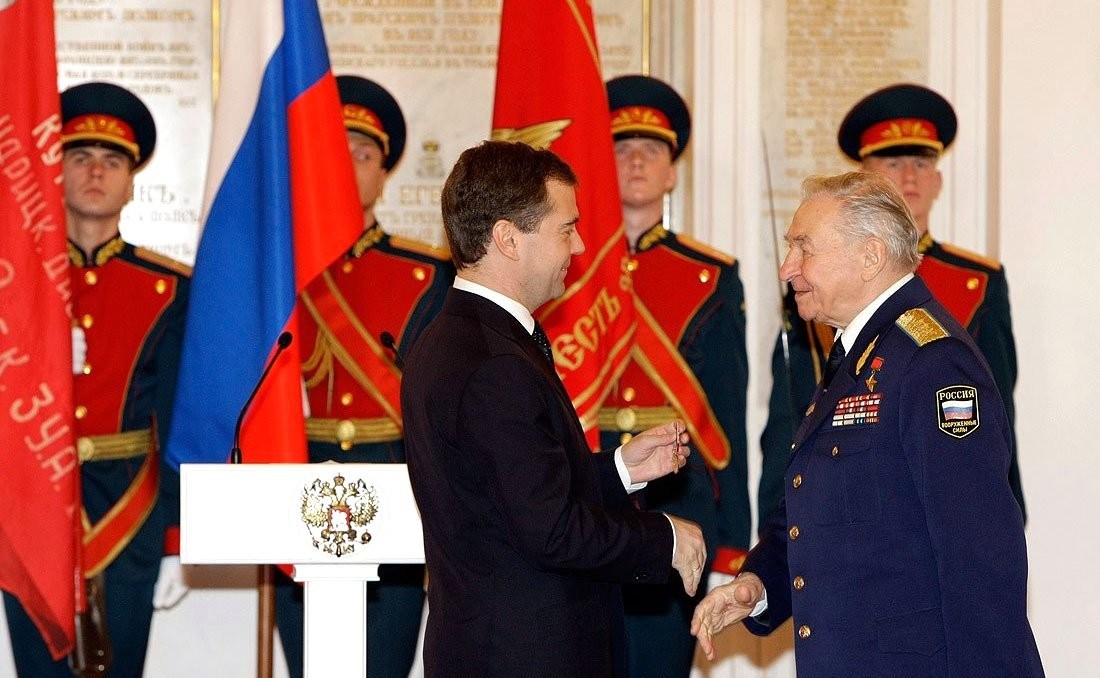
Colonel General Vasily Reshetnikov

== See also ==
- Awards and decorations of the Russian Federation
- Awards and decorations of the Soviet Union
