= Vasily Petrov (marshal) =

Russian military official (1917–2014)

Vasiliy Ivanovich Petrov
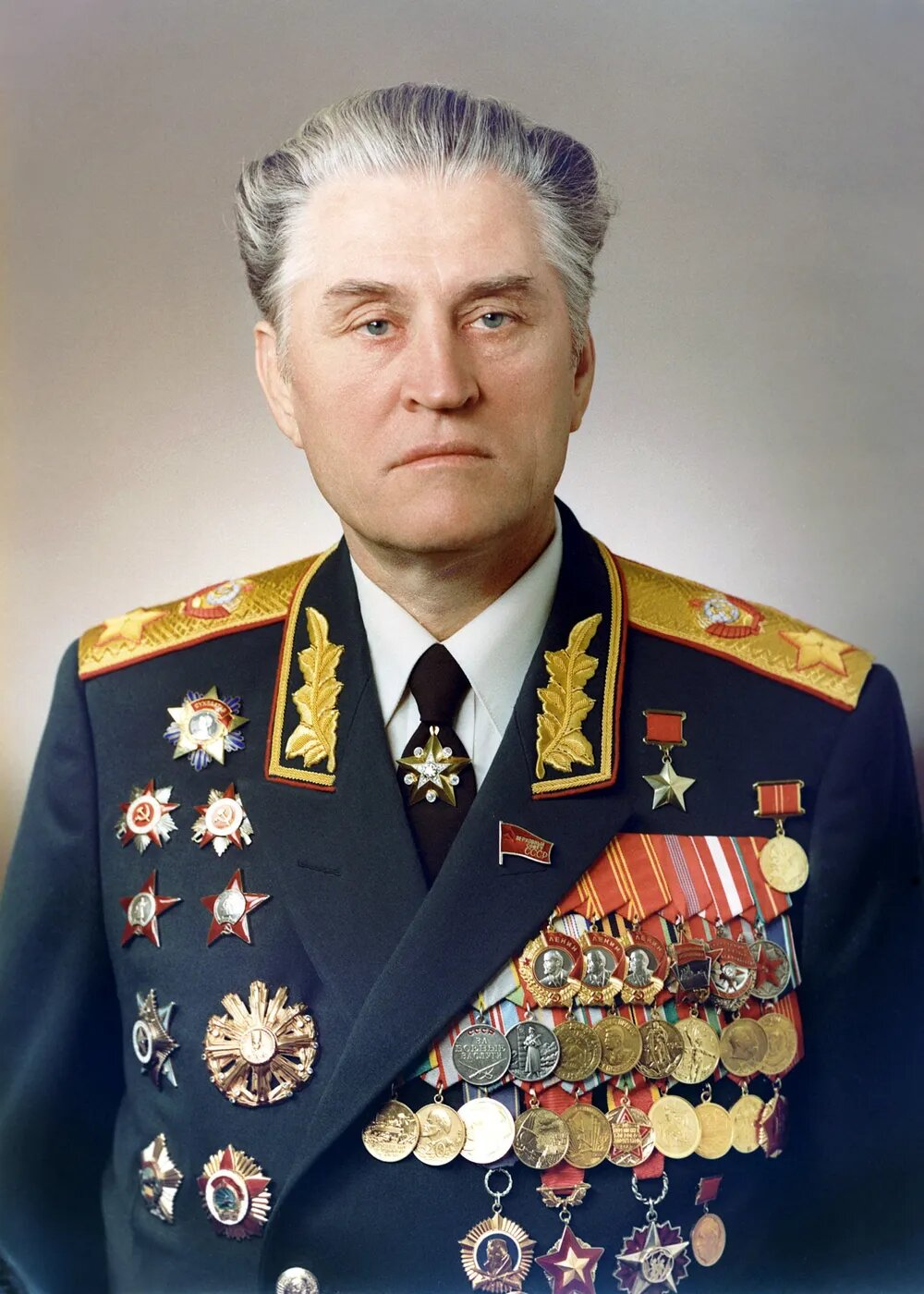
- Born: 15 January 1917; Chernolesskoye, Stavropol Governorate, Russian Empire
- Died: 1 February 2014 (aged 97); Moscow, Russia
- Burial place: Federal Military Memorial Cemetery, Moscow Oblast
- Military career
- Allegiance: Soviet Union
- Branch: Soviet Army
- Service years: 1939–1986
- Rank: Marshal of the Soviet Union
- Commands: Far East Military District; Soviet Ground Forces
- Conflicts: World War II; Ogaden War; Angolan Civil War

Vasiliy Ivanovich Petrov (Russian: Васи́лий Ива́нович Петро́в; 15 January [O.S. 2 January] 1917 – 1 February 2014) was a Soviet and Russian military officer and Marshal of the Soviet Union. He served as Commander-in-Chief of the Soviet Ground Forces from 1980 to 1985.

== Background ==
Vasily Ivanovich Petrov was born on 15 January 1917 in the village of Chernolesskoye, Stavropol Governorate, the son of a white-collar employee. He graduated from secondary school in 1935 and studied for two years at the Ordzhonikidze Pedagogical Institute until 1937. Petrov joined the Red Army in 1939 and completed the lieutenant's course in 1941. During the Second World War, he fought in defence of Odessa, defence of Sevastopol and the Campaign in the Caucasus. He later took part in the liberation of Ukraine (part of the USSR) and the invasion of Romania, in addition to the Budapest Offensive in Hungary.

After the war, Petrov completed the Accelerated Course of the Frunze Military Academy in Moscow, and in 1948 graduated from the academy's Special Course. He served in staff roles at the army level in the early postwar years. He served with the 39th Rifle Division as a regimental commander from June 1953 and rose to division chief of staff in December 1955. Petrov was promoted to division commander in January 1957, continuing in command after the 39th was reorganized as the 129th Motor Rifle Division later that year. He was promoted to army chief of staff in July 1961, army commander in June 1964, chief of staff of the Far Eastern Military District in January 1966, and district commander in April 1972. Simultaneously, Petrov rose through the Soviet military ranks, being promoted to Colonel in 1952, Major General in 1961, Lieutenant General in 1965, Colonel General in 1970 and General in 1972. In 1983, Petrov was finally appointed Marshal of the Soviet Union.

In the late 1970s, Petrov served as a military advisor to the Ethiopian Army. He was assigned to assist and rebuild the force during the Ogaden War. In 1982, Petrov was awarded the Hero of the Soviet Union. He commanded the Far East Military District in 1972–1976 and served as Commander-in-Chief of Ground Forces in 1980–1985. He then succeeded Sergey Sokolov as First Deputy Minister of Defence until his retirement in 1986 due to ill health. From 1992, Petrov served as a military advisor to the Ministry of Defence of the Russian Federation. Petrov died on 1 February 2014 at the age of 97, and was laid to rest at the Federal Military Memorial Cemetery in Moscow Oblast.

== Honours and awards ==
Soviet Union and Russia

- Hero of the Soviet Union (16 February 1982)
- Order of Alexander Nevskiy (3 May 2012)
- Four Orders of Lenin (December 1967, February 1978, 16 February 1982, January 1987)
- Order of the October Revolution (February 1974)
- Order of the Red Banner (October 1944)
- Order of the Patriotic War, 1st class, twice (July 1944, April 1985), 2nd class (October 1943)
- Order of the Red Star, twice (November 1942, October 1955)
- Order for Service to the Homeland in the Armed Forces of the USSR, 3rd class (February 1976)
- Medal for Combat Service
- Medal "For Distinction in Guarding the State Border of the USSR"
- Medal "For the Defence of the Caucasus"
- Medal "For the Defence of Odessa"
- Medal "For the Defence of Sevastopol"
- Medal "For Strengthening Military Cooperation"
- Medal "For the Victory over Germany in the Great Patriotic War 1941–1945"
- Jubilee Medal "Twenty Years of Victory in the Great Patriotic War 1941–1945"
- Jubilee Medal "Thirty Years of Victory in the Great Patriotic War 1941–1945"
- Jubilee Medal "Forty Years of Victory in the Great Patriotic War 1941–1945"
- Medal "For the Capture of Budapest"
- Jubilee Medal "50 Years of Victory in the Great Patriotic War 1941–1945"
- Jubilee Medal "60 Years of Victory in the Great Patriotic War 1941–1945"
- Jubilee Medal "65 Years of Victory in the Great Patriotic War 1941–1945"

Foreign awards

- Order of Ernesto Che Guevara, 1st class (Cuba, 1985)
- Order of the Red Banner (Czechoslovakia) (1982)
- Order of Victorious February (Czechoslovakia) (1985)
- Order of Sukhbaatar (Mongolia, 1981)
- Order of the Red Banner (Mongolia, 1982)
- Order "For Military Merit" (Mongolia, 1971)
- Scharnhorst Order (East Germany, 1983)
- Order of the Flag of the Hungarian People's Republic with diamonds (Hungary, 1985)
- Order of Tudor Vladimirescu, 1st class (Romania, 1974)
- Order "For Military Merit", 1st class (Romania, 1985)
- Order of the National Flag (Ethiopia, 1982)
- Order of the National Flag of Korea (North Korea, 1985)
- Order of the People's Republic of Bulgaria, 1st class (1985)
- Order "For military Valour", 1st class (1983)

Faith-based

- Order of St. Grand Prince Dmitriy Donskoy, 2nd class

== Notes ==
Military offices
| Preceded by Aleksandr Mayorov | First Deputy Commander in Chief of the Soviet Ground Forces; 1976–1979 | Succeeded by Vladimir Yakushin |
| Preceded by Petr Belik | Commander in Chief of the Far Eastern Theatre of Military Operations; 1979–1980 | Succeeded by Vladimir Govorov |
| Preceded by Ivan Pavlovsky | Commander in Chief of the Soviet Ground Forces; 1980–1985 | Succeeded by Yevgeny Ivanovsky |
Political offices
| Preceded by Sergey Sokolov | First Deputy Minister of Defence of the Soviet Union; 1985–1986 | Succeeded by Petr Lushev |
