= Medal "For the Defence of Kiev" =

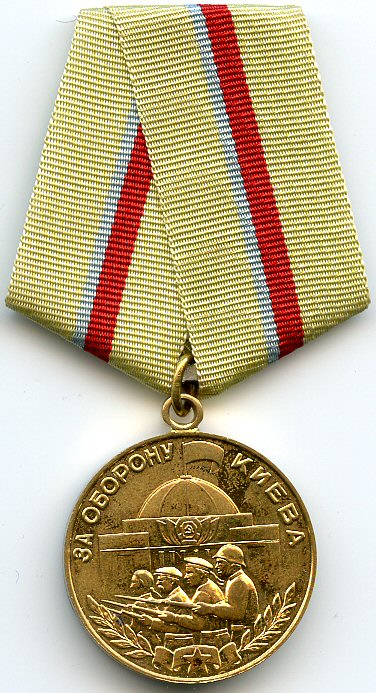
- Medal "For the Defence of Kiev" (obverse)
- Type: Campaign medal
- Awarded for: Participation in the defence of Kiev
- Presented by: USSR
- Eligibility: Citizens of the Soviet Union
- Status: No longer awarded
- Established: June 21, 1961

Highlights
- Total: 107,540
- Ribbon of the Medal "For the Defence of Kiev"

Precedence
- Next (higher): Medal "For the Defence of Stalingrad"
- Next (lower): Medal "For the Defence of the Caucasus"

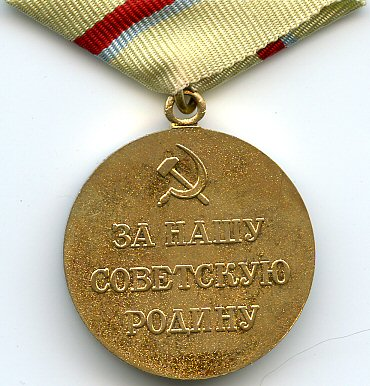
Reverse of the Medal "For the Defence of Kiev"

The Medal "For the Defence of Kiev" (Russian: Медаль «За оборону Киева») was a World War II campaign medal of the Soviet Union established on June 21, 1961 by decree of the Presidium of the Supreme Soviet of the USSR to be awarded to the participants of the defence of the city of Kiev during the 1941 invasion of the USSR by Nazi Germany.

== Medal Statute ==
The Medal "For the Defence of Kiev" was awarded to all participants in the defence of the Hero-City of Kiev - Soviet Army soldiers and troops of the former NKVD, as well as all the workers who participated in the defence of Kiev in the ranks of the militia, in the construction of fortifications, who worked in factories serving the needs of the front, members of the Kiev underground and partisans who fought against the enemy near Kiev.

Award of the medal was made on behalf of the Presidium of the Supreme Soviet of the USSR on the basis of documents attesting to actual participation in the defence of Kiev. Serving military personnel received the medal from their unit commander, retirees from military service received the medal from a regional, municipal or district military commissioner in the recipient's community, members of the civilian population, participants in the defence of Kiev received their medal from the Kiev Oblast and city Soviets. For the defenders who died in battle or prior to the establishment of the medal, it was awarded posthumously to the family.

The Medal "For the Defence of Kiev" was worn on the left side of the chest and in the presence of other awards of the USSR, was located immediately after the Medal "For the Defence of Stalingrad". If worn in the presence of Orders or medals of the Russian Federation, the latter have precedence.

== Medal Description ==
The Medal "For the Defence of Kiev" was a 32mm in diameter circular brass medal with a raised rim. On its obverse, the relief image of the building of the Supreme Soviet of the Ukrainian SSR with a flag waving from its rooftop mast. Against the background of the building, the relief images of a red soldier, a red sailor, a worker and a woman, all guerrillas facing left with rifles at the ready. Along the upper circumference of the medal, the relief inscription "FOR THE DEFENSE OF KIEV" (Russian: «ЗА ОБОРОНУ КИЕВА») bisected by the waving flag. At the bottom, a relief five pointed star over a ribbon itself superimposed over laurel branches. On the reverse near the top, the relief image of the hammer and sickle, below the image, the relief inscription in three rows "FOR OUR SOVIET MOTHERLAND" (Russian: «ЗА НАШУ СОВЕТСКУЮ РОДИНУ»).

The Medal "For the Defence of Kiev" was secured by a ring through the medal suspension loop to a standard Soviet pentagonal mount covered by a 24 mm wide olive green silk moiré ribbon with two central stripes, a 2 mm blue stripe and a 4 mm red stripe.

== Recipients (partial list) ==
The individuals below were all recipients of the Medal "For the Defence of Kiev".

- Artillery specialist Colonel Ivan Fedorovich Ladyga
- Marshal of the Soviet Union Konstantin Rokossovsky
- Army General Ivan Ivanovich Fedyuninsky
- Colonel General Aleksandr Ilich Rodimtsev
- Marshal of the Soviet Union Ivan Khristoforovich Bagramyan

== See also ==
- Awards and decorations of the Soviet Union
- Battle of Kiev (1943)
- Hero City
