= Medal "For the Capture of Budapest" =

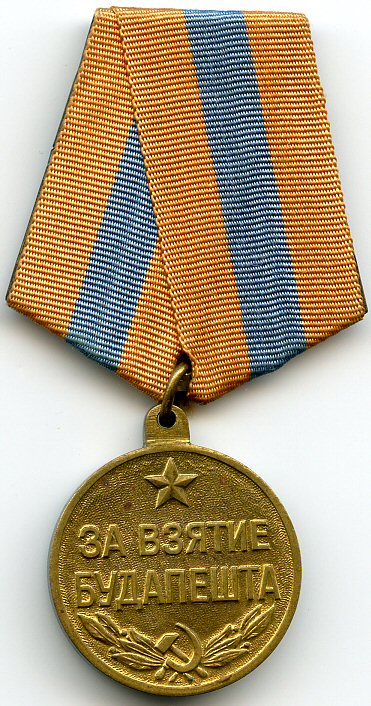
- Medal "For the Capture of Budapest" (obverse)
- Type: Campaign medal
- Awarded for: Participation in the capture of Budapest
- Presented by: USSR
- Eligibility: Citizens of the Soviet Union
- Status: No longer awarded
- Established: 9 June 1945

Highlights
- Total: 362,050
- Ribbon of the Medal "For the Capture of Budapest"

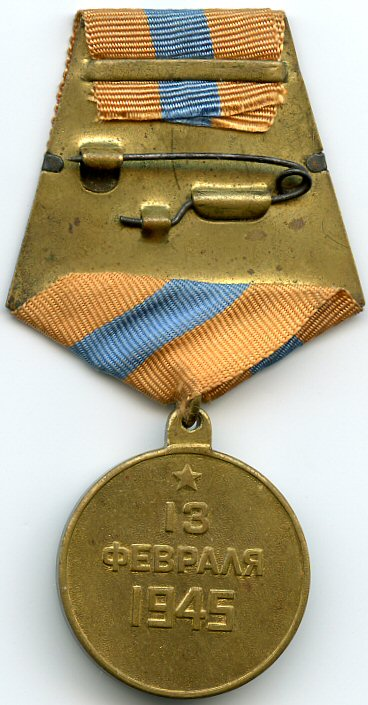
Reverse of the Medal "For the Capture of Budapest"

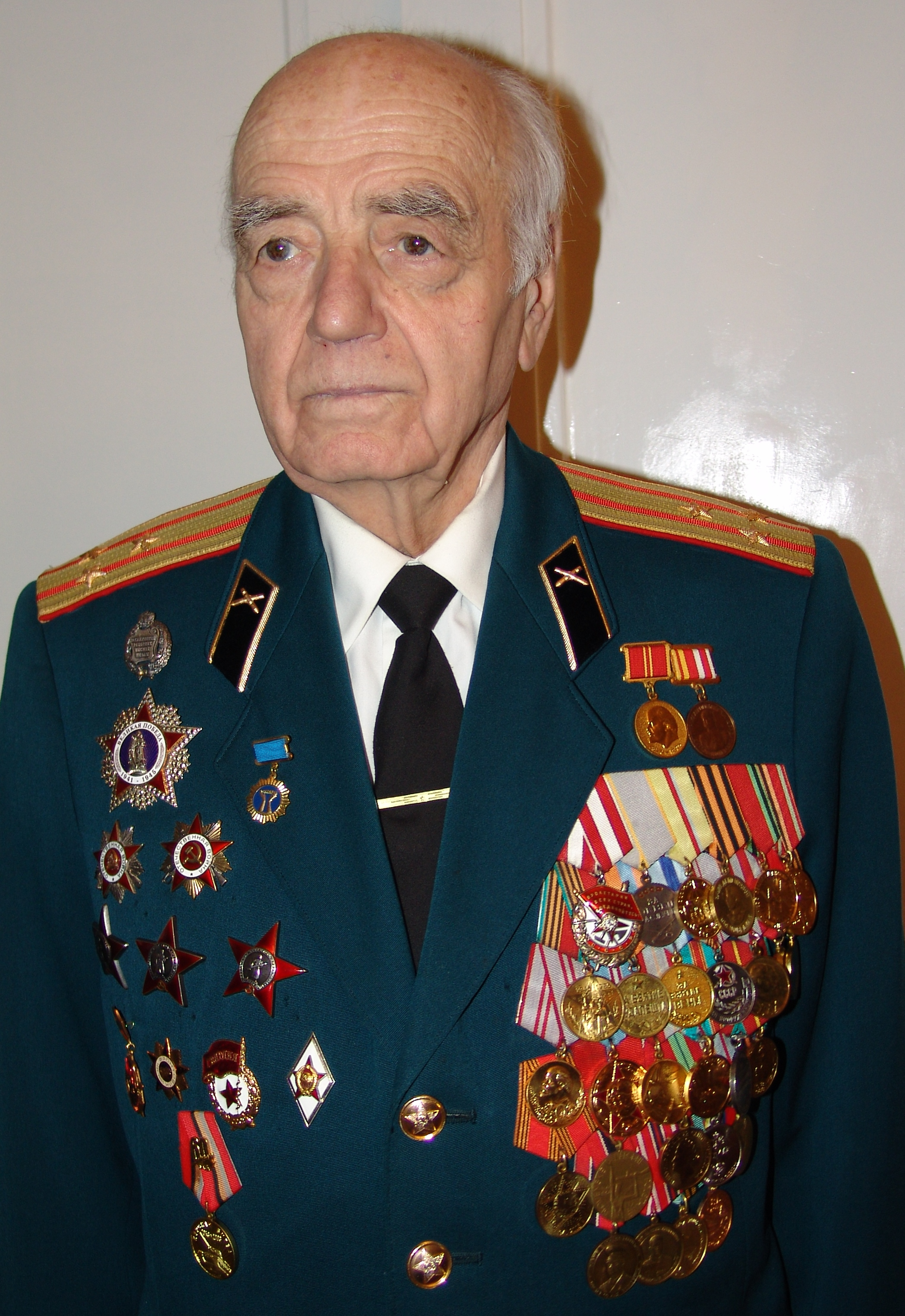
Colonel Ivan Ladyga, a recipient of the Medal "For the Capture of Budapest"

The Medal "For the Capture of Budapest" (Russian: Медаль «За взятие Будапешта») was a World War II campaign medal of the Soviet Union established on 9 June 1945 by decree of the Presidium of the Supreme Soviet of the USSR to satisfy the petition of the People's Commissariat for Defense of the Soviet Union to recognise and reward the participants of the battle for the capture of the city of Budapest from the armed forces of Nazi Germany. The medal's statute was amended on 18 July 1980 by decree of the Presidium of the Supreme Soviet of the USSR № 2523-X.

== Medal statute ==
The Medal "For the Capture of Budapest" was awarded to soldiers of the Red Army, Navy and troops of the NKVD, direct participants of the heroic assault and capture of Budapest as well as to the organizers and leaders of combat operations in the capture of this city.

Award of the medal was made on behalf of the Presidium of the Supreme Soviet of the USSR on the basis of documents attesting to actual participation in the capture of Budapest. Serving military personnel received the medal from their unit commander, retirees from military service received the medal from a regional, municipal or district military commissioner in the recipient's community.

The Medal "For the Capture of Budapest" was worn on the left side of the chest and in the presence of other awards of the USSR, was located immediately after the Medal "For the Victory over Japan". If worn in the presence of orders or medals of the Russian Federation, the latter have precedence.

== Medal description ==
The Medal "For the Capture of Budapest" was a 32mm in diameter circular brass medal with a raised rim on the obverse. On its obverse at the top, a relief five-pointed star, its top point touching the medal's upper rim. Below the star, the relief inscription in bold letters on two rows "FOR THE CAPTURE OF BUDAPEST" (Russian: «ЗА ВЗЯТИЕ БУДАПЕШТА»). At the bottom, the relief image of a wreath of oak branches going up the left and right circumference of the medal up to the lower row of the inscription, in the center of the wreath, the relief image of the hammer and sickle. On the reverse at the top, a relief plain five-pointed star, below the star, the relief date in three rows "13 FEBRUARY 1945" (Russian: «13 ФЕВРАЛЯ 1945»).

The Medal "For the Capture of Budapest" was secured by a ring through the medal suspension loop to a standard Soviet pentagonal mount covered by a 24mm wide silk moiré orange ribbon with an 8mm wide central blue stripe.

== Recipients (partial list) ==
The individuals below were all recipients of the Medal "For the Capture of Budapest".

- Marshal of the Soviet Union Rodion Yakovlevich Malinovsky
- Marshal of the Soviet Union Fyodor Ivanovich Tolbukhin
- Marshal of the Soviet Union Nikolai Vasilyevich Ogarkov
- Marshal of the Soviet Union Vasily Ivanovich Petrov
- Colonel General Nikolai Petrovich Kamanin
- Sapper Vladimir Fedorovich Chekalov
- World War 2 veteran, painter Piotr Konstantinovich Vasiliev
- War Correspondent Pyotr Andreyevich Pavlenko
- Colonel Ivan Fedorovich Ladyga
- Army General Semion Pavlovich Ivanov
- Lieutenant General Georgy Timofeyevich Beregovoy
- Military photographer Yevgeny Anan'evich Khaldei
- Lieutenant General Kuzma Nikolayevich Derevyanko
- Actor Georgi Aleksandrovich Yumatov
- Chief Marshal of Artillery Mitrofan Ivanovich Nedelin
- Lieutenant Grigory Yakovlevich Baklanov
- Lieutenant General Vitaly Ivanovich Popkov
- Chief Petty Officer Ekaterina Illarionovna Mikhailova-Demina
- Soldier Pavel Filimonovichi Tuhari

== See also ==
- Siege of Budapest
- Awards and decorations of the Soviet Union
