= Jubilee Medal "60 Years of Victory in the Great Patriotic War 1941–1945" =

Commemorative medal of several post-Soviet countries

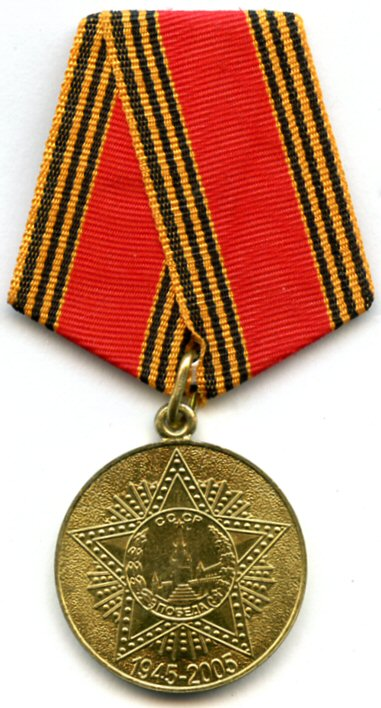
- Jubilee Medal "60 Years of Victory in the Great Patriotic War 1941–1945" (obverse)
- Type: State Commemorative Medal
- Awarded for: World War 2 service
- Presented by: Russian Federation; Ukraine; Republic of Belarus (1991–1995); Kazakhstan; Moldova; Armenia; Uzbekistan
- Eligibility: Citizens of the Russian Federation and foreign nationals
- Status: No longer awarded
- Established: February 28, 2004
- Ribbon of the Jubilee Medal "60 Years of Victory in the Great Patriotic War 1941–1945"

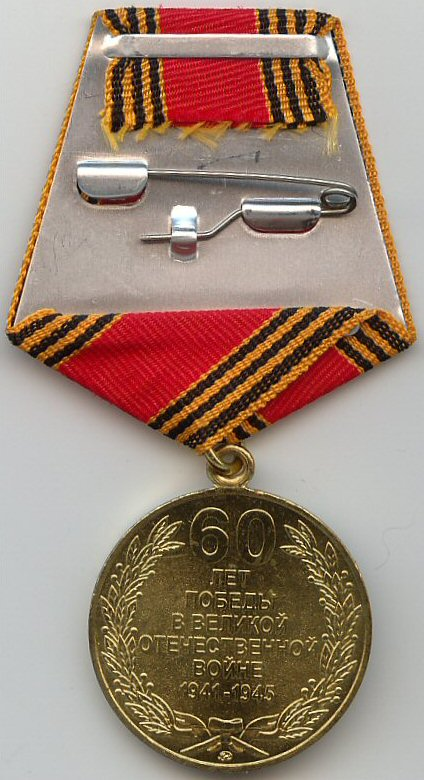
Reverse of the Jubilee Medal "60 Years of Victory in the Great Patriotic War 1941–1945"

The Jubilee Medal "60 Years of Victory in the Great Patriotic War 1941–1945" (Russian: Юбилейная медаль «60 лет Победы в Великой Отечественной войне 1941–1945 гг.») is a state commemorative medal of the Russian Federation created to denote the 60th anniversary of the 1945 victory over Nazi Germany. It was established on February 28, 2004 by Presidential Decree № 277.

== Medal statute ==
The Jubilee Medal "60 Years of Victory in the Great Patriotic War 1941–1945" is awarded to veterans of the Armed Forces of the USSR who participated in the fighting in the Great Patriotic War, guerrillas, the Underground, those awarded the Medal "For the Victory over Germany in the Great Patriotic War 1941–1945" or "For the Victory over Japan", persons awarded for their selfless work the medal Medal "For Valiant Labour in the Great Patriotic War 1941-1945" or "Citizen of the siege of Leningrad" or any of the "Defence" medals of the cities or regions of the USSR; to persons who worked in the period from 22 June 1941 to May 9, 1945 for no less than six months, excluding the period of work in the temporarily occupied territories; former under-age prisoners of concentration camps, ghettos and other places of detention established by the Nazis and their allies; foreign nationals from outside the Commonwealth of Independent States who fought in the national military forces in the USSR, as part of guerilla units, underground groups, and other anti-fascist groups who have made significant contribution to victory in the Great Patriotic War and who were awarded state awards of the USSR or Russian Federation.

Presidential Decree 1099 of September 7, 2010 removed the Jubilee Medal "60 Years of Victory in the Great Patriotic War 1941–1945" from the list of state awards of the Russian Federation. It is no longer awarded.

== Medal description ==
The Jubilee Medal "60 Years of Victory in the Great Patriotic War 1941–1945" is a 32mm in diameter tombac circular medal. Its obverse bears the relief image of the Order of Victory, at the bottom, the relief numbers "1945–2005". The reverse bears the inscription in seven lines "60 Years of Victory in the Great Patriotic War of 1941–1945" (Russian: "60 лет Победы в Великой Отечественной войне 1941–1945") within a laurel wreath.

The medal is suspended by a ring through the award's suspension loop to a standard Russian pentagonal mount covered with an overlapping 24mm wide red silk moiré ribbon with 5mm edge Ribbons of Saint George.

== Recipients ==
The individuals below were recipients of the Jubilee Medal "60 Years of Victory in the Great Patriotic War 1941–1945".

=== Russian Federation ===
- Cellist and conductor Mstislav Leopoldovich Rostropovich
- Marshal of the Soviet Union Sergei Leonidovich Sokolov
- Marshal of the Soviet Union Vasily Ivanovich Petrov
- Artillery officer Colonel Ivan Fedorovich Ladyga
- Hero of the Soviet Union Lieutenant General Galaktion Yeliseyevich Alpaidze
- Hero of the Soviet Union Kazakh Army General Sagadat Nurmagambetov

=== Foreign nationals ===
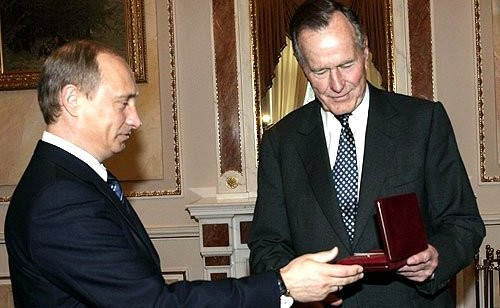
Bush receiving the medal from Russian president Vladimir Putin in May 2005.

- King Michael I of Romania
- President of Greece Karolos Papoulias
- Polish general and former president Wojciech Jaruzelski
- Former American president George H. W. Bush
- Former Albanian president Alfred Moisiu
- Former Croatian president Stjepan Mesić
- Kim Jong Il Leader of the Democratic People's Republic of Korea (1994-2012) general secretary of the Workers' Party of Korea (1994-2012)

== See also ==
- Awards and decorations of the Russian Federation
- Awards and decorations of the Soviet Union
