= Medal "Veteran of the Armed Forces of the USSR" =

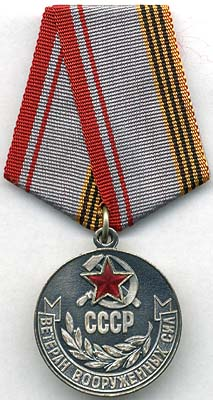
- Medal "Veteran of the Armed Forces of the USSR" (obverse)
- Type: Service medal
- Awarded for: 25 years service in the Soviet Armed Forces
- Presented by: USSR
- Eligibility: Citizens of the Soviet Union
- Status: No longer awarded
- Established: May 20, 1976

Highlights
- Total: ~800,000
- Ribbon of the Medal "Veteran of the Armed Forces of the USSR"

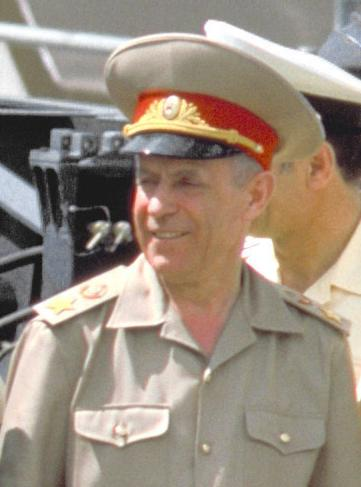
Marshal of the Soviet Union Sergey Akhromeyev, a recipient of the Medal "Veteran of the Armed Forces of the USSR"

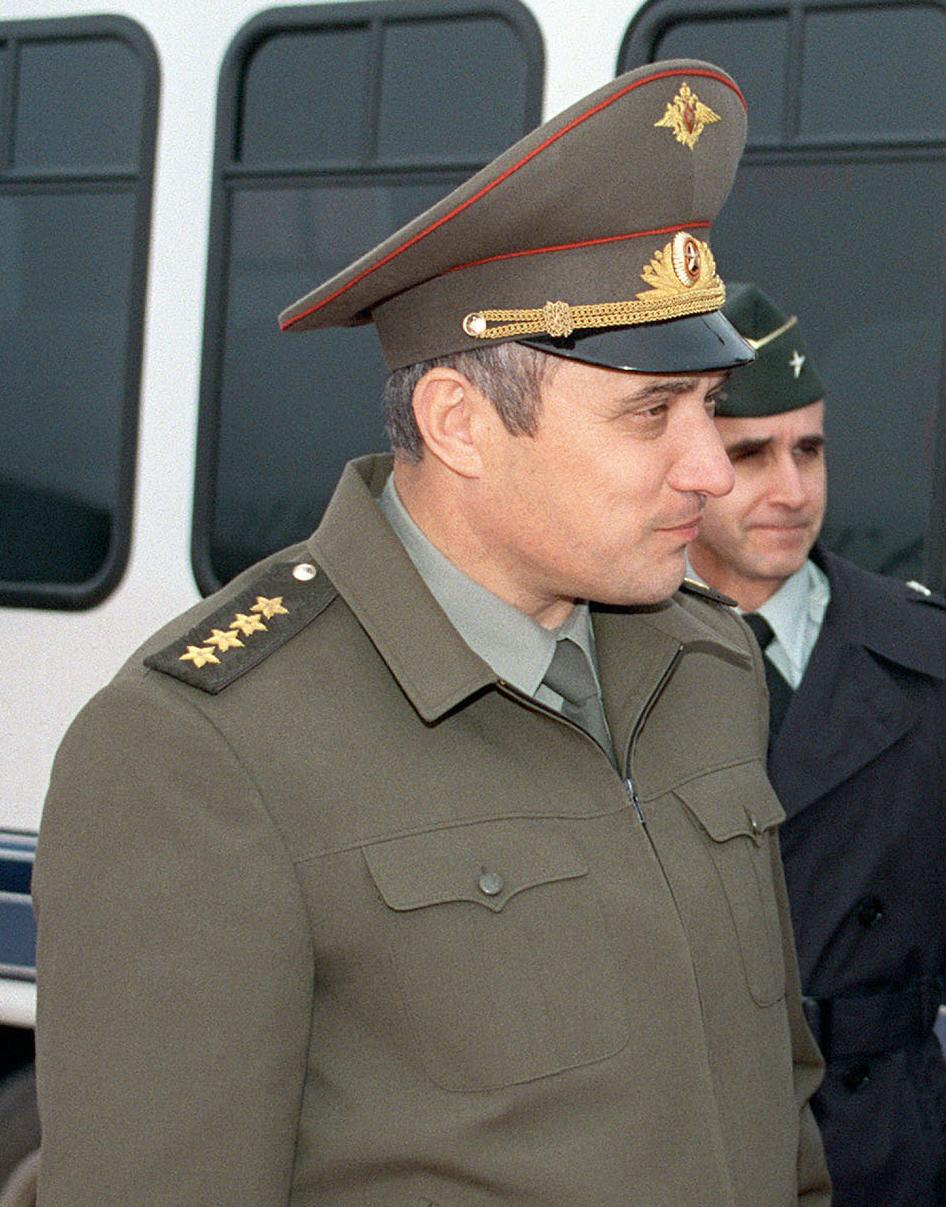
Army General Anatoly Kvashnin, a recipient of the Medal "Veteran of the Armed Forces of the USSR"

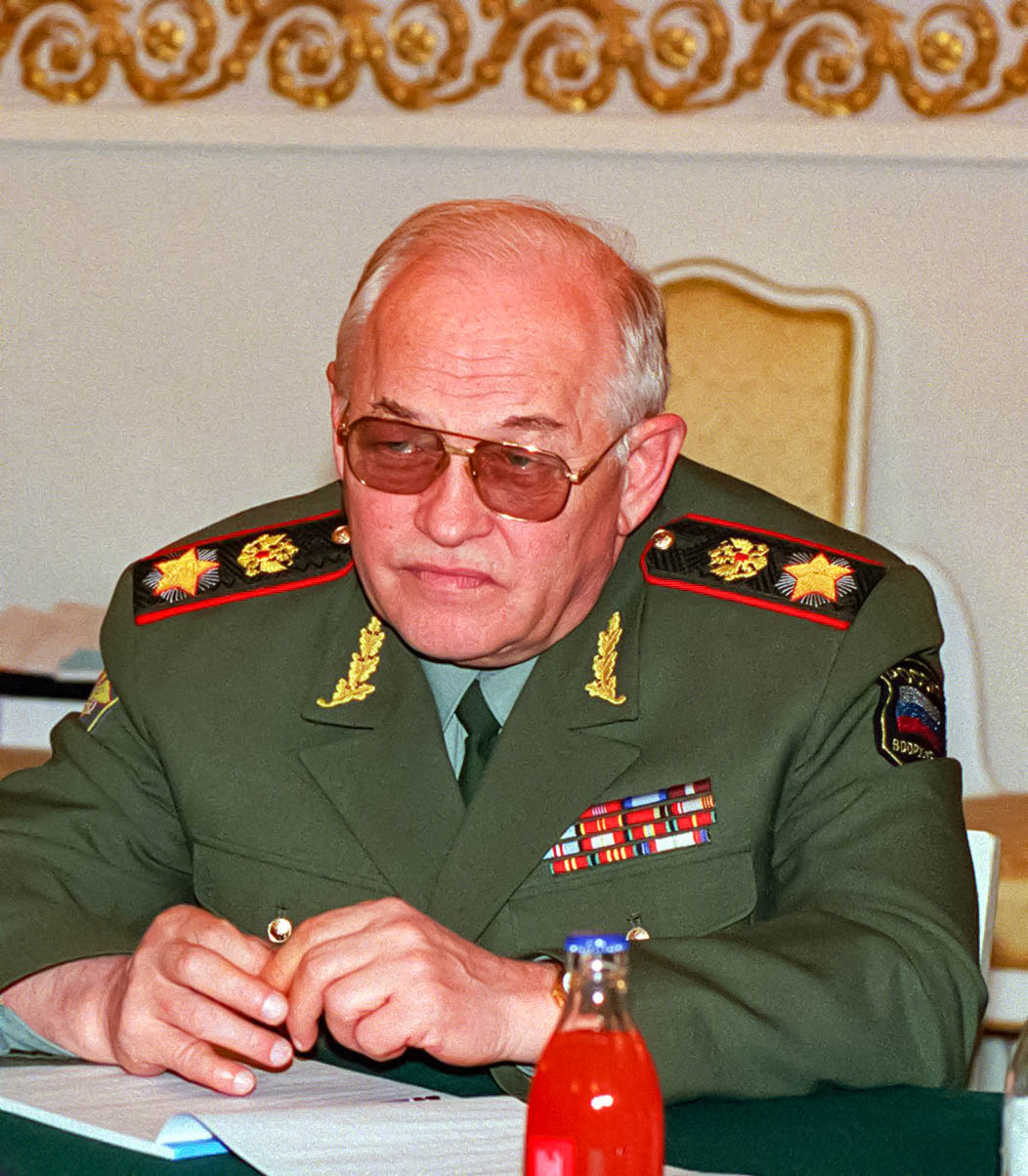
Marshal of the Russian Federation Igor Sergeyev, a recipient of the Medal "Veteran of the Armed Forces of the USSR"

The Medal "Veteran of the Armed Forces of the USSR" (Russian: Медаль «Ветеран Вооружённых Сил СССР») was a long service award of the Armed Forces of the Soviet Union established on May 20, 1976, by decree of the Presidium of the Supreme Soviet of the USSR and awarded for twenty-five years of impeccable service to troops of the army, navy, of internal forces and of border troops. Its statute was twice amended by further decrees of the Presidium of the Supreme Soviet of the USSR, first on July 18, 1980 and lastly on January 10, 1984.

== Medal statute ==
The Medal "Veteran of the Armed Forces of the USSR" was awarded to soldiers of the Soviet Army, of the Soviet Navy, of Border Troops and of Internal Troops, who impeccably served in the Armed Forces of the USSR for 25 years or more. The medal could also be awarded to persons already retired from the service prior to the issuance of the Decree establishing it, who impeccably served in the Armed Forces of the USSR for 25 years or more.

The medal was awarded on behalf of the Presidium of the Supreme Soviet of the USSR by the Ministry of Defence of the USSR, the Ministry of Internal Affairs of the USSR and by the State Security Committee of the USSR.

The Medal "Veteran of the Armed Forces of the USSR" was worn on the left side of the chest and when in the presence of other Orders and medals of the USSR, was located immediately after the Medal "Veteran of Labour". If worn in the presence of awards of the Russian Federation, the latter have precedence.

== Medal description ==
The Medal "Veteran of the Armed Forces of the USSR" was a 32mm in diameter silver-plated tombac circular medal with a raised rim. The obverse was oxidised, it bore at its upper section a ruby-red enamelled five pointed star superimposed on the relief image of the hammer and sickle, just below in the center, the relief inscription "USSR" (Russian: «СССР») over a curled laurel branch; at the bottom along the medal circumference, a relief scroll with the inscription in prominent letters "VETERAN OF THE ARMED FORCES" (Russian: «ВЕТЕРАН ВООРУЖЕННЫХ СИЛ»). The reverse was plain with a matte finish.

The medal was secured to a standard Soviet pentagonal mount by a ring through the medal suspension loop. The mount was covered by a 24mm wide grey silk moiré ribbon with four orange and three black stripes alternating along its right edge and two red stripes along its left edge. The width of the orange and black stripes was 1mm except for the outermost orange stripe which was 2mm, the red stripes were respectively of 3mm and 1mm with a spacing of 2mm.

== Recipients (partial list) ==
The individuals below were all recipients of the Medal "Veteran of the Armed Forces of the USSR".

- Marshal of Aviation Alexander Ivanovich Pokryshkin
- Marshal of the Soviet Union Vasily Ivanovich Chuikov
- Major General Vladimir Sergeyevich Ilyushin
- Marshal of the Soviet Union Ivan Ignatyevich Yakubovsky
- Marshal of the Soviet Union Sergey Fyodorovich Akhromeyev
- Admiral of the Fleet Sergey Georgiyevich Gorshkov
- Colonel General Gennady Nikolayevich Troshev
- Army General Viktor Germanovich Kazantsev
- Army General Anatoly Vasiliyevich Kvashnin
- Marshal of the Soviet Union Pavel Fyodorovich Batitsky
- Marshal of the Russian Federation Igor Dmitriyevich Sergeyev
- Army General Ivan Ivanovich Fedyuninsky
- Army General Mukhtar Qapashuly Altynbayev
- Marshal of the Soviet Union Ivan Khristoforovich Bagramyan
- Colonel General Georgy Filippovich Baydukov
- Colonel Vladimir Vasilievich Kvachkov
- Lieutenant Colonel Zinoviy Grigor'evich Kolobanov
- Army General Anatoly Mikhaïlovich Kornukov
- Colonel General Mikhail Ivanovich Barsukov
- Colonel Ivan Fedorovich Ladyga
- Army General Semion Pavlovich Ivanov
- Army General Sagadat Kozhahmetovich Nurmagambetov

== See also ==
- Medal "For Impeccable Service"
- Orders, decorations, and medals of the Soviet Union
- Badges and Decorations of the Soviet Union
