= Sergei Sokolov (marshal) =

Defense Minister of the Soviet Union

Marshal of the Soviet Union Sergei Sokolov
- Сергей Соколов
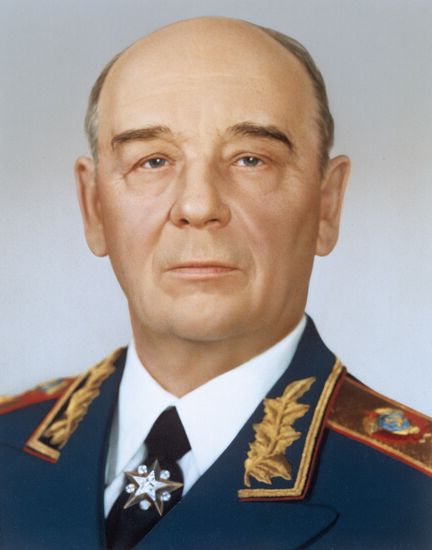
- Sokolov in 1984

Minister of Defence of the Soviet Union
- In office 22 December 1984 – 29 May 1987
- Premier: Nikolai Tikhonov; Nikolai Ryzhkov
- Preceded by: Dmitriy Ustinov
- Succeeded by: Dmitry Yazov

Candidate member of the 27th Politburo
- In office 6 March 1986 – 26 June 1987

Personal details
- Born: 1 July 1911 Yevpatoria, Russian Empire
- Died: 31 August 2012 (aged 101) Moscow, Russia
- Resting place: Novodevichy Cemetery
- Party: Communist Party of the Soviet Union (1937–1987)
- Awards: Hero of the Soviet Union; Order of Honour

Military service
- Allegiance: Soviet Union
- Branch/service: Soviet Army
- Years of service: 1932–1987
- Rank: Marshal of the Soviet Union (1978–1987)
- Battles/wars: Battle of Lake Khasan; World War II; Soviet–Afghan War

Sergei Leonidovich Sokolov (Russian: Серге́й Леони́дович Соколо́в; 1 July 1911 – 31 August 2012) was a Soviet military commander, Hero of the Soviet Union, and served as Minister of Defence of the Soviet Union from 22 December 1984 until 29 May 1987.

== Childhood and war service ==
The son of an Imperial Russian army officer, Sokolov's early years were marked by the upheavals of the Russian Revolution. Following his family's relocation to Kotelnich in the Vyatka province, he began his career in the regional consumer union before transitioning to Komsomol work. In 1932, Sokolov joined the Red Army, embarking on a distinguished military career. Graduating from the Gorky Armored School, he served in the Far East, commanding various units with distinction. Notably, he served in the Battle of Lake Khasan during the Soviet-Japanese Border Wars. He also fought against Nazi Germany during World War II.

== Post war ==
He was Commander of the Leningrad Military District from 1965 to 1967 and First Deputy Defense Minister from 1967 to 1984.

== Senior leadership ==
Sokolov was promoted to Marshal of the Soviet Union in 1978. He was in charge of Soviet ground forces during the Soviet invasion of Afghanistan. He personally led the main Soviet incursion of ground forces on 27 December 1979. His actions and command strategies during the war made him one of the Soviet Union's most respected Marshals. On 28 April 1980 he was awarded the title Hero of the Soviet Union.

Sokolov was appointed Minister of Defense of the Soviet Union in 1984 and held this post until 1987, when he was dismissed by Mikhail Gorbachev as a result of the Mathias Rust affair. He was also a candidate (non-voting) member of the Politburo from 1985 to 1987.

== Post-service ==
From June 1987 to July 1989, he was a member of the Group of Inspectors General. For some time he was an adviser to the Commander-in-Chief of the United Armed Forces of the Commonwealth of Independent States. From 1992, Sokolov was an advisor to the Minister of Defense of the Russian Federation. In July 2001, he became an honorary citizen of Crimea, Ukraine. From 2002 to 2012, he headed the Club of Military Veterans at the Moscow House of War and Armed Forces Veterans. On turning 100 he stated, "Military service prestige will regain the importance it once had."

== Death ==
Sokolov died of undisclosed causes on 31 August 2012, at the age of 101. He was buried on 3 September with full military honors at the Novodevichy Cemetery in Moscow, next to his wife of 70 years, Maria Samojlovna Sokolova (16 December 1919 – 28 August 2012) who had predeceased him three days prior.

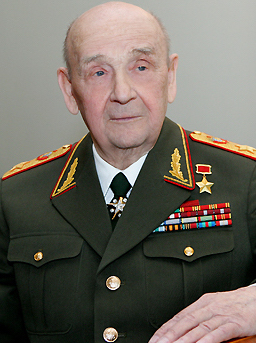
Sergei Sokolov in 2008.

== Personal life ==
He was survived by two sons, Colonel-General Valery Sergeyevich (born 30 September 1940), now a lecturer at the Faculty of Command and General Staff Military Academy, and Colonel-General Vladimir Sergeyevich (born 22 January 1947), who had retired during the war in Afghanistan and was chief of staff of the 40th Army.

== Dates of rank ==
From the corresponding article in the Russian Wikipedia

- Cadet (May 1932 – November 1934)
- Platoon Commander – November 1934
- Junior Lieutenant – 1935
- Lieutenant – 1938
- Captain – 1941
- Major – before 1943
- Lieutenant Colonel – before 1943
- Colonel – 9 September 1943
- Major General – 3 August 1953
- Lieutenant General – 25 May 1959
- Colonel General – 13 April 1963
- General of the Army – 12 April 1967
- Marshal of the Soviet Union – 17 February 1978

== Honours and awards ==
Russia

- Order of Merit for the Fatherland;
  - 2nd class (21 June 2001) – for outstanding contribution to strengthening national defense and active in the patriotic education of young people
  - 3rd class (30 June 1996) – for services to the state and personal contribution to the development and reform of the Armed Forces of the Russian Federation
  - 4th class (2 November 2009)
- Order of Alexander Nevsky (23 June 2011) – contribution to strengthening national defense and long-term public activities
- Order of Honour (1 July 2006) – for services to strengthen national defense and work on the patriotic education of youth
- Order of Zhukov (25 April 1995) – for actions in the leadership of the troops in combat operations during the Great Patriotic War of 1941–1945

Soviet Union

- Hero of the Soviet Union (28 April 1980) – for personal courage and the management of troops, manifested in the provision of international assistance to the Democratic Republic of Afghanistan
- Three Orders of Lenin (30 June 1971, 28 April 1980, 30 June 1986)
- Order of the Red Banner, twice (20 April 1953, 22 February 1968)
- Order of Suvorov, 1st class (6 May 1982)
- Order of the Patriotic War, 1st class (6 April 1985)
- Order of the Red Star, twice (14 January 1943, 6 November 1947)
- Order for Service to the Homeland in the Armed Forces of the USSR, 3rd class (30 April 1975)
- Medal For Courage
- Medal for Combat Service
- Jubilee Medal "In Commemoration of the 100th Anniversary since the Birth of Vladimir Il'ich Lenin"
- Medal "For Distinction in Guarding the State Border of the USSR"
- Medal "For the Defence of the Soviet Transarctic"
- Medal "For the Victory over Germany in the Great Patriotic War 1941–1945"
- Medal "For Impeccable Service" 1st class
- jubilee medals

Russian; non-governmental

- Order of Saint Righteous Grand Duke Dmitry Donskoy, 2nd class (Russian Orthodox Church, 2005)

Afghanistan

- Order of the Red Banner (1982)
- Order of the Saur Revolution (1984)

Bulgaria

- Order of Georgi Dimitrov, twice (1985, 1986)
- Order "The People's Republic of Bulgaria" I degree (1974)
- Medal "25 Years of the Bulgarian People's Army" (1969)
- Medal "30 Years of Victory over Fascism" (1975)
- Medal "30 Years of the Bulgarian People's Army" (1974)
- The medal "For Strengthening Brotherhood in Arms" (1977)
- Medal "100 years of the liberation of Bulgaria from the Ottoman yoke" (1978)
- The medal "90th anniversary of the birth of Georgi Dimitrov" (1974)
- Medal "100th Anniversary of Birth of Georgi Dimitrov" (1983)
- Medal "1300 years Bulgaria" (1982)
- Medal "40 Years of Victory over Fascism" (1985)

Hungary

- Order of the Flag of the Hungarian Republic with rubies (1986)
- Medal "For military cooperation", 1st class (1980)

Vietnam

- Order of Ho Chi Minh (1985)
- Order "For Military Valor", 1st class (1983)

East Germany

- Order of Karl Marx (1986)
- Medal "Brotherhood in Arms" (1980)
- Medal "30 Years of the National People's Army" (1986)

Jordan

- Order of Independence , 1st class (1977)

North Korea

- Medal "40 years of Korea's liberation" (1985)

Cuba

- Order of Playa Girón (1986)
- Medal "20 Years of Revolutionary Armed Forces" (1978)
- Medal "30 Years of Revolutionary Armed Forces" (1986)

Mongolia

- Order of Sukhbaatar, twice (1971, 1986)
- Order of the Red Banner (1982)
- Medal "30 Years of Victory over Japan" (1976)
- Medal "30 Years of Victory in Khalkhin" (1969)
- Medal "40 Years of Victory in Khalkhin" (1979)
- Medal "50 Years of the Mongolian People's Revolution" (1972)
- Medal "60 Years of the Mongolian People's Revolution" (1982)
- Medal "50 Years of the Mongolian People's Army" (1971)
- Medal "60 Years of the Armed Forces of the MPR" (1982)

Poland

- Order of Merit of the Republic of Poland, 2nd class (1985)
- Order of Polonia Restituta, 2nd and 3rd classes (1968, 1971)

Romania

- Order of Tudor Vladimirescu, 1st class (1969)
- Order of 23 August (1974)
- Medal "30 Years of Liberation from Fascism Romania" (1974)
- The medal "For Military Merit" (1980)

Czechoslovakia

- Order of Klement Gottwald (1985)
- Medal "For the strengthening of friendship in Arms", 1st class (1972)
- Medal "40 Years of the Slovak National Uprising" (1985)
- Medal "50 Years of the Communist Party of Czechoslovakia" (1971)

Finland

- Order of the White Rose of Finland, 1st class (1986)

In July 2001, on the day of his 90th birthday, was awarded the title "Honorary krymchanin" and made an honorary citizen of Evpatoria.

Military offices
Preceded by Mikhail Kazakov	Commander of Leningrad Military District; 1965–1967	Succeeded by Ivan Shavrov
Political offices
New office	First Deputy Minister of Defence of the Soviet Union; 1967–1984	Succeeded by Vasily Petrov
Preceded by Dmitry Ustinov	Minister of Defence of the Soviet Union; 1984–1987	Succeeded by Dmitry Yazov
