= Jubilee Medal "50 Years of Victory in the Great Patriotic War 1941–1945" =

Commemorative medal of several post-Soviet countries

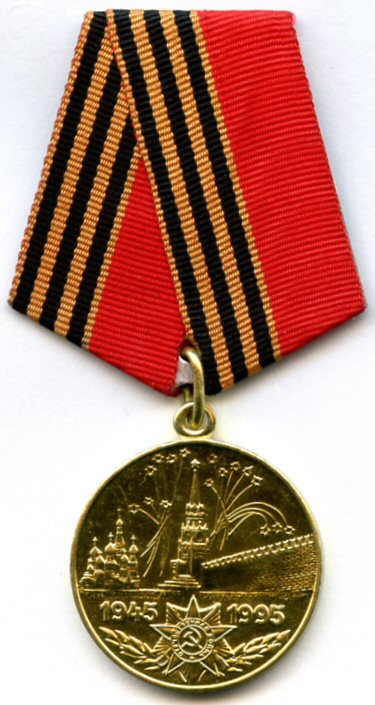
- Jubilee Medal "50 Years of Victory in the Great Patriotic War 1941–1945" (obverse)
- Type: State Commemorative Medal
- Awarded for: World War 2 service
- Presented by: Russian Federation; Ukraine; Armenia; Republic of Belarus (1991–1995); Kazakhstan; Azerbaijan
- Eligibility: Citizens of the Russian Federation and foreign nationals
- Status: No longer awarded
- Established: July 7, 1993
- Ribbon of the Jubilee Medal "50 Years of Victory in the Great Patriotic War 1941–1945"

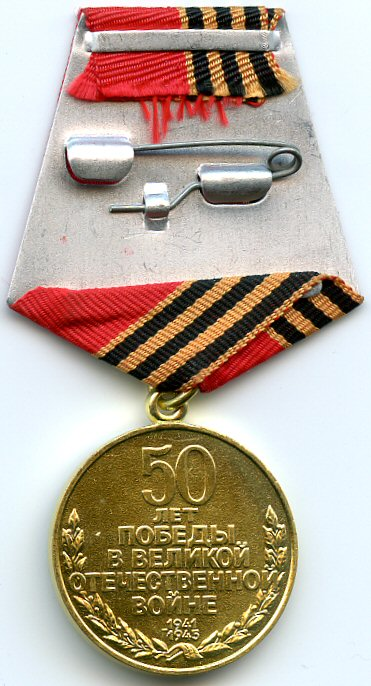
Reverse of the Jubilee Medal "50 Years of Victory in the Great Patriotic War 1941–1945"

The Jubilee Medal "50 Years of Victory in the Great Patriotic War 1941–1945" (Russian: Юбилейная медаль «50 лет Победы в Великой Отечественной войне 1941–1945 гг.», romanized: Yubileynaya medal' «50 let Pobedy v Velikoy Otechestvennoy voyne 1941–1945 gg.») is a state commemorative medal of the Russian Federation created to denote the 50th anniversary of the 1945 victory over Nazi Germany. It was established on July 7, 1993, by the Law of the Russian Federation No. 5336-1. It was also established in Ukraine, in Kazakhstan by Decision of the Supreme Council of the Republic of Kazakhstan No. 2485-XII of October 26, 1993, and in the Republic of Belarus on the basis of Presidential Decree No. 102 of March 14, 1995.

== Medal statute ==
The Jubilee Medal "50 Years of Victory in the Great Patriotic War 1941–1945" is awarded to veterans of the Armed Forces of the USSR who participated in the fighting in the Great Patriotic War, guerrillas, the Underground, those awarded the Medal "For the Victory over Germany in the Great Patriotic War 1941–1945" or "For the Victory over Japan", persons awarded for their selfless work the medal Medal "For Valiant Labour in the Great Patriotic War 1941-1945" or "Citizen of the siege of Leningrad" or any of the "Defence" medals of the cities or regions of the USSR; to persons who worked in the period from 22 June 1941 to May 9, 1945, for no less than six months, excluding the period of work in the temporarily occupied territories; former under-age prisoners of concentration camps, ghettos and other places of detention established by the Nazis and their allies; foreign nationals from outside the Commonwealth of Independent States who fought in the national military forces in the USSR, as part of guerilla units, underground groups, and other anti-fascist groups who have made significant contribution to victory in the Great Patriotic War and who were awarded state awards of the USSR or Russian Federation.

Presidential Decree 1099 of September 7, 2010 removed the Jubilee Medal "50 Years of Victory in the Great Patriotic War 1941–1945" from the list of state awards of the Russian Federation. It is no longer awarded.

== Medal description ==
The Jubilee Medal "50 Years of Victory in the Great Patriotic War 1941–1945" is a 32mm in diameter tombac circular medal. Its obverse bears the relief image of the Kremlin Wall with the Spasskaya Tower and Saint Basil's Cathedral, all under fireworks. At the bottom, a relief image of the Order of the Patriotic War over a laurel wreath, the dates "1945" on the left, and "1995" on the right of the image of the Order. On the otherwise plain reverse, the relief inscription in six lines "50 Years of Victory in the Great Patriotic War 1941–1945" Russian: "50 лет Победы в Великой Отечественной войне 1941–1945"). AT center below the inscription, the dates "1941 – 1945". A laurel wreath surrounds the reverse inscriptions from the bottom to just over halfway up along the medal circumference. The medal is suspended by a ring through the award's suspension loop to a standard Russian pentagonal mount covered with an overlapping 24mm wide silk moiré ribbon, the right half is red, the left half is the Ribbon of Saint George.

== Recipients ==
The individuals below were all recipients of the Jubilee Medal "50 Years of Victory in the Great Patriotic War 1941–1945".

=== Russian Federation ===
- World War 2 combat pilot Hero of the Soviet Union senior lieutenant Anna Yegorova
- Army General Anatoly Kornukov
- World War 2 artillery officer Colonel Ivan Fedorovich Ladyga
- World War 2 infantry officer and author Vasil Bykaŭ
- Veteran of Stalingrad, stage actor and director Yuri Petrovich Lyubimov
- World War 2 veteran, pianist and composer Tikhon Nikolayevich Khrennikov
- Marshal of the Soviet Union Vasily Ivanovich Petrov
- Folk singer Lyudmila Georgievna Zykina
- Politician Vladimir Ivanovich Dolgikh

=== Foreign nationals ===
- Polish General and President Wojciech Jaruzelski
- British Royal Navy Chief Petty Officer William Frederick "Bill" Stone
- American Commanding Officer Robert Trimble, Poltava Airbase 1945
- American paratrooper and a prisoner of war in WW2 Joseph Beyrle
- World War 2 Armenian veteran and chemist Vram Dovlatyan
- Azerbaijani aviator and professor Mazahir Abasov

== See also ==
- Awards and decorations of the Russian Federation
- Awards and decorations of the Soviet Union
- Eastern Front (World War II)
