= Jubilee Medal "70 Years of the Armed Forces of the USSR" =

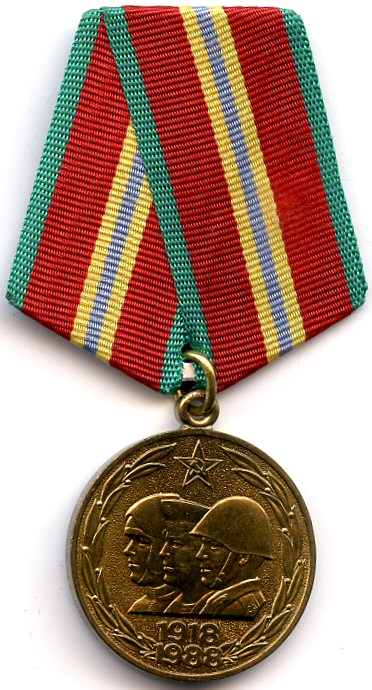
- Jubilee Medal "70 Years of the Armed Forces of the USSR" (obverse)
- Type: Jubilee medal
- Awarded for: Military service on February 28, 1988
- Presented by: USSR
- Eligibility: Citizens of the Soviet Union
- Status: No longer awarded
- Established: January 28, 1988

Highlights
- Total: 9,842,160
- Ribbon of the Jubilee Medal "70 Years of the Armed Forces of the USSR"

The Jubilee Medal "70 Years of the Armed Forces of the USSR" (Russian: Юбилейная медаль «70 лет Вооружённых Сил СССР») was a state military commemorative medal of the Soviet Union established on January 28, 1988 by decree of the Presidium of the Supreme Soviet of the USSR to denote the seventieth anniversary of the creation of the Soviet Armed Forces.

== Medal Statute ==
The Jubilee Medal "70 Years of the Armed Forces of the USSR" was awarded to officers, warrant officers, sergeants, petty officers, sailors and soldiers, enlisted in the service and on active duty on February 23, 1988, in the Soviet Army, Navy, in the troops of the Ministry of Internal Affairs, in the armed forces of organs of the State Security, in the Council of Ministers of the USSR; to former Red Guards, soldiers who took part in the fighting to protect the Soviet homeland in the Armed Forces of the USSR, to partisans of the Civil War and the Great Patriotic War of 1941–1945; persons discharged from active military service in the reserve or retired, who served in the Soviet Army, Navy, in the troops of the Ministry of Internal Affairs, in the armed forces and organs of the State Security Council of Ministers of the USSR for 20 years or more or that were awarded during their active duty, military orders of the USSR or the medals "For courage", Ushakov, "For Military Merit", "For Distinction in Protection of State Border of the USSR", Nakhimov, "For Distinction in Military Service".

The medal was awarded on behalf of the Presidium of the Supreme Soviet of the USSR by commanders of military units, agencies and institutions. For retirees, by republican, territorial, regional, district, municipal and district military commissariats. Each medal came with an attestation of award, this attestation came in the form of a small 8 cm by 11 cm cardboard booklet bearing the award's name, the recipient's particulars and an official stamp and signature on the inside.

The Jubilee Medal "70 Years of the Armed Forces of the USSR" was worn on the left side of the chest and when in the presence of other medals of the USSR, it was located immediately after the Jubilee Medal "60 Years of the Armed Forces of the USSR". If worn in the presence or awards of the Russian Federation, the latter have precedence.

== Medal Description ==
The Jubilee Medal "70 Years of the Armed Forces of the USSR" is a 32mm in diameter circular brass medal with a raised rim on both sides. On its obverse in the center, the relief left overlapping bust profiles of three Soviet servicemen, a pilot wearing a flight helmet at left, a sailor in the middle, a helmeted soldier at right; above then the relief image of a five pointed star containing the hammer and sickle; below them the relief inscription in two rows “1918” and “1988” superimposed on a wreath of oak and laurel going up around the circumference of the medal and separated at the top by the five pointed star. On the reverse, the relief inscription on five rows "70 Years of the Soviet Armed Forces" above crossed laurel and oak branches.

The medal was secured to a standard Soviet pentagonal mount by a ring through the medal suspension loop. The mount was covered by a 24mm wide red silk moiré ribbon with 2mm green edge stripes and a central 2mm blue stripe bordered by yellow 2mm stripes.

== Recipients (partial list) ==
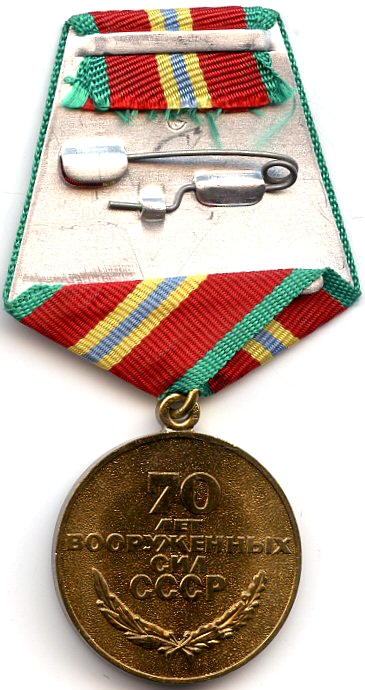
Reverse of the Jubilee Medal "70 Years of the Armed Forces of the USSR"

The individuals below were all recipients of the Jubilee Medal "70 Years of the Armed Forces of the USSR".

- Cosmonaut Colonel Yuri Ivanovich Malenchenko
- Marshal of the Russian Federation and Defence Minister Igor Dmitriyevich Sergeyev
- Colonel General Pavel Alekseyevich Kurochkin
- Fleet Admiral Vladimir Ivanovich Kuroyedov
- Army General and former Deputy Defence Minister Yury Nikolayevich Baluyevsky
- Senior Lieutenant Anna Alexandrovna Timofeyeva-Yegorova
- Hero of the Soviet Union Sergeant Meliton Varlamovich Kantaria
- Colonel General Boris Vsevolodovich Gromov
- Hero of the Russian Federation Major General of Naval Aviation Timur Avtandilovich Apakidze
- Marshal of the Soviet Union Sergei Leonidovich Sokolov
- Army General Anatoly Vasiliyevich Kvashnin
- Army General Viktor Germanovich Kazantsev
- Lieutenant General Vladimir Anatolyevich Shamanov
- Colonel General Gennady Nikolayevich Troshev
- Fleet Admiral Vladimir Grogo'evich Yegorov
- FSB General Rashid Gumarovich Nurgaliyev
- Hero of Belarus Lieutenant Colonel Uładzimir Mikałajevič Karvat
- FSB Director and Army General Nikolai Platonovich Patrushev
- Cosmonaut Colonel Aleksandr Aleksandrovich Skvortsov
- Kazakh Army General Mukhtar Qapashuly Altynbayev
- World War 2 combat pilot Major Natalya Fyodorovna Meklin
- General and politician Nikolay Nikolayevich Bordyuzha
- Hero of Azerbaijan Lieutenant Colonel Riad Fikrat ogly Ahmadov
- World War 2 combat pilot Polina Vladimirovna Gelman
- Major General Igor Dmitrievich Sergun

== See also ==
- Red Army
- Awards and decorations of the Soviet Union
