= Russian heraldry =

Study of coats of arms in the lands of historical Russia

- Lesser State Emblem of the Russian Empire (final version, 1883)
- Heraldic tradition: Eastern European
- Governing body: State Heraldic Register of the Russian Federation

Russian heraldry involves the study and use of coats of arms and other heraldic insignia in the country of Russia. Compare the socialist heraldry of the Soviet period of Russian history (1917–1991).

== History ==
=== Precursors ===
Seal of Ivan the Terrible

Before conventional heraldry was introduced to Russia, rulers of Kievan Rus' and its principalities used a variety of symbols to represent their authority. The early Rurikid rulers used unique stylised symbols, resembling tridents, on seals, coins and weapons that belonged to them. These were inherited from father to son in one way or another – although each descendant tweaked the symbol somewhat – but were not heraldic in the traditional sense of the word, and were closer to Turco-Mongolian tamgas. Other principalities frequently used mythical animals, or human figures, such as knights, in their seals. The influence of the Byzantine Empire was often felt in these emblems, some of which featured Byzantine elements, such as angels, perhaps due to princes employing Greek seal-stampers. In the seal of Ivan III of Russia, the usage of a Byzantine symbol – the two-headed eagle – was also a sign of pretense, as its rulers, after Ivan's marriage to Sophia Palaiologina, could trace their ancestry to the empire's ruling house.

The two seal designs used in Moscow – the aforementioned double-headed eagle and the "yezdets", a horseman (or more specifically Saint George) killing a dragon – became the two main elements in the modern-day coat of arms of Russia, as well as the arms of the Russian Empire before that.

=== Imperial heraldry ===
True armorial bearings were not used in Russia until the 17th century, although some have speculated about times earlier than this. Early arms were at least partly inspired by Western designs, and this was made more great by the acquisition of Ukraine, which had already been influenced by western heraldry. Early designs did not follow the usual rules of heraldry. By 1689, there was some legal status of arms, helped by the nobility reforms of 1682, and the ideas of Peter the Great.

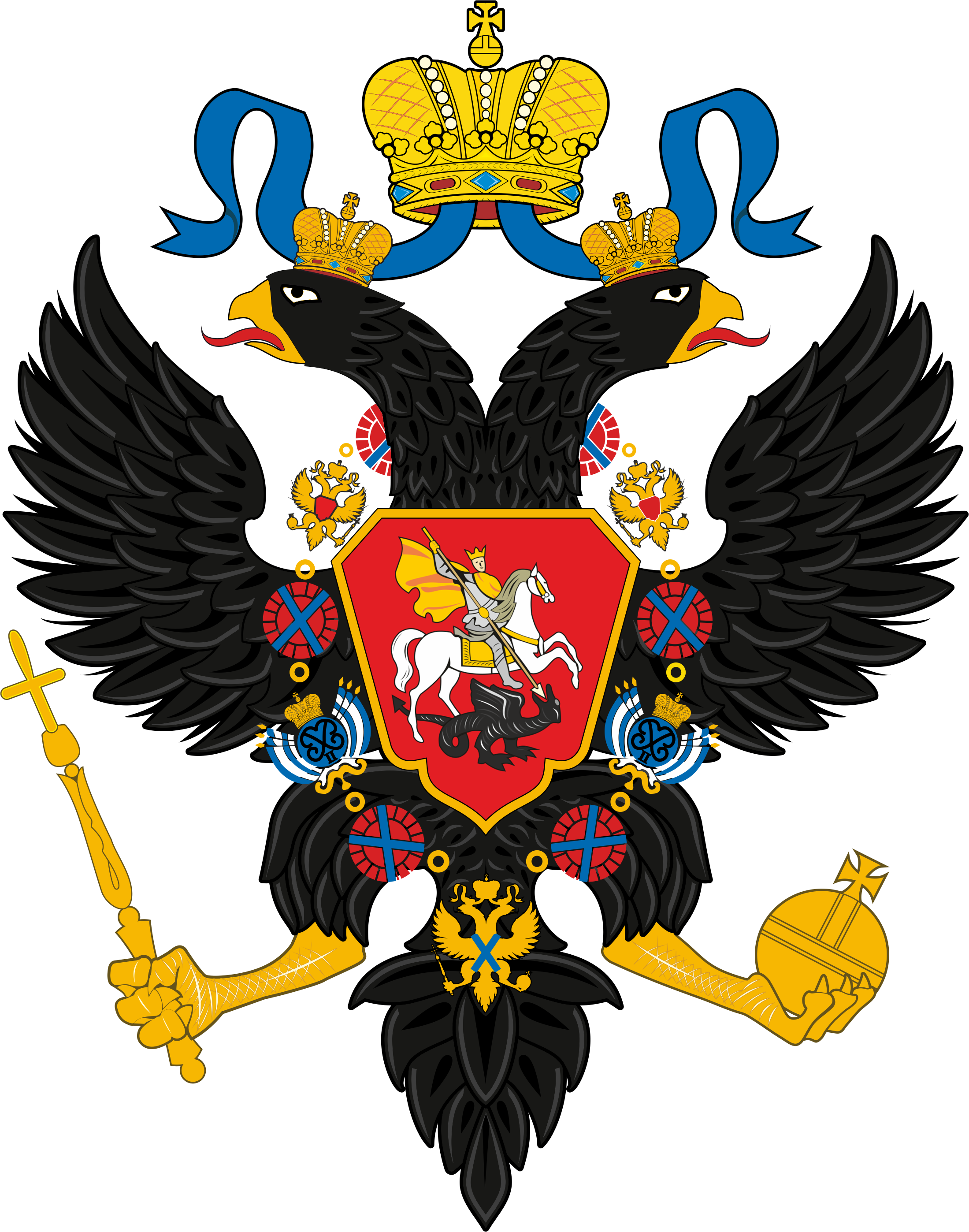
1703–1730 coat of arms

He oversaw the first officers of arms, the turning of state symbols into true heraldry, and started to protect certain families' rights to particular arms.

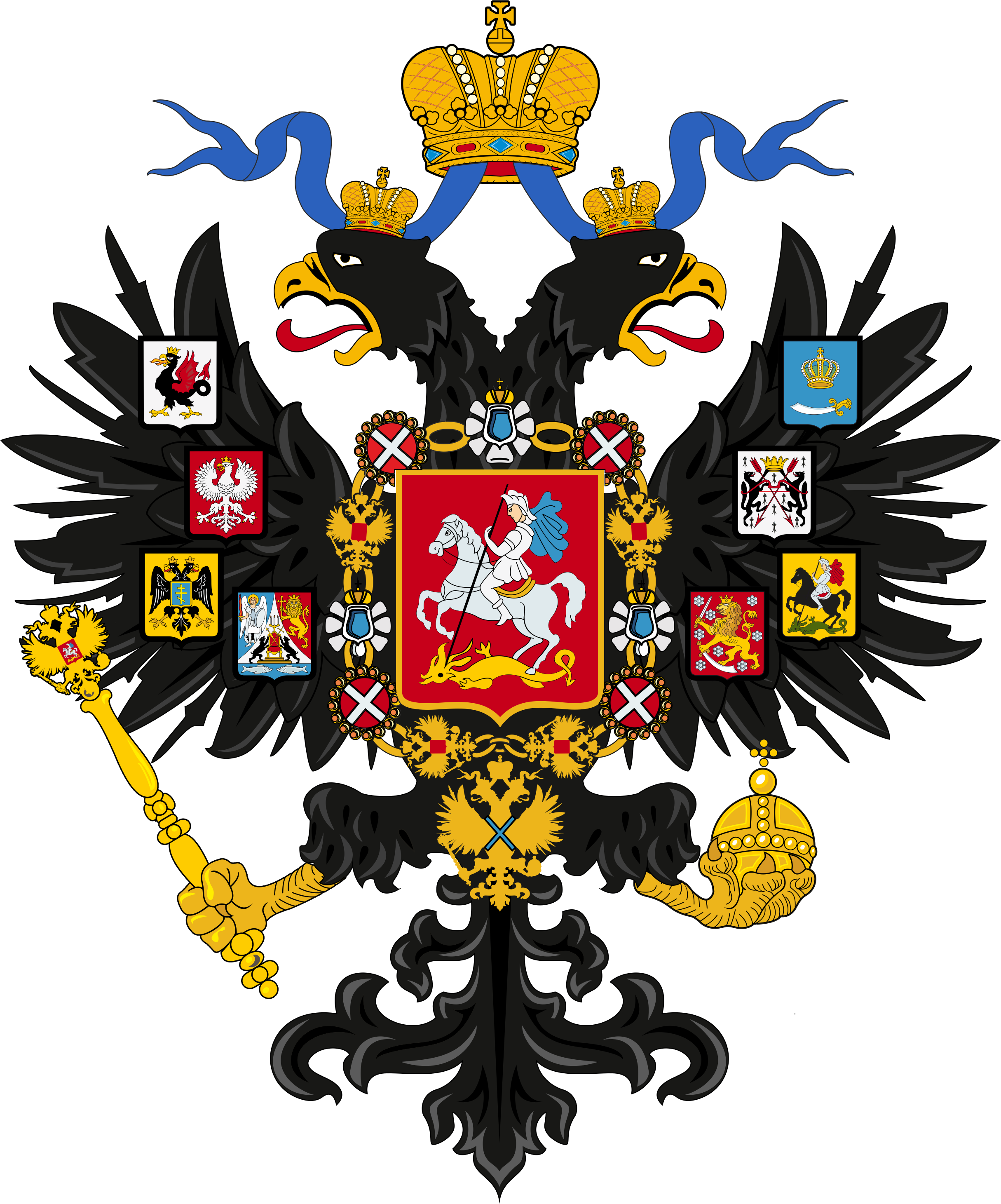
1856–1883

=== Soviet heraldry ===
The Soviet Union, created after the 1917 revolution, required insignia to represent itself in line with other sovereign states, such as emblems, flags and seals, but the Soviet leaders did not wish to continue the old heraldic practices which they saw as associated with the societal system the revolution sought to replace. In response to the needs and wishes, the national emblem adopted would lack the traditional heraldic elements of a shield, helm, crest and mantling, and instead be presented more plainly. This style was followed then by other socialist and communist states, which wished to also focus attention on the nation's workers and diverge from feudalism and all of its associations.

== Coat of arms of Russia ==
Coat of arms of Russia since 1993

The coat of arms of the Russian Federation derives from the earlier arms of the Russian Empire, as restored in 1992/3 after the dissolution of the Soviet Union. Though modified more than once since the reign of Ivan III (1462–1505), the current coat of arms is directly derived its medieval original. The general chromatic layout corresponds to the early-15th-century standard. The shape of the eagle can be traced back to the reign of Peter the Great (1682–1725), although the eagle in the modern arms is gold instead of the imperial black. It is similar to the national emblems of the Russian Empire. The current coat of arms was designed by artist Yevgeny Ukhnalyov; it was adopted officially on November 30, 1993.

A horseman, considered to be Saint George, killing a dragon, is the second of the two main Russian symbols. It is the coat of arms of Moscow and used on the flag of Moscow (which is a banner of arms) and as an inescutcheon (smaller shield) on the coat of arms of Russia.

The state coat of arms of the Soviet Union (Russian: Государственный герб СССР Gosudarstvennyiy gerb SSSR) was adopted in 1923 and was used until the break-up of the Soviet Union in 1991. Although it technically is an emblem rather than a coat of arms, since it doesn't follow heraldic rules, in Russian it is called герб (transliteration: gerb), the word used for a traditional coat of arms.

== Regulation ==
In Imperial Russia, the use of coats of arms was not regulated – although comparatively common among the upper classes, arms of non-nobles were rare, although they were not banned. However, since they were not condoned, they were rare. In modern times, use has become more common. There has been no change in regulation, although the use of traditional noble indicators (certain types of helms, and supporters, for example) is restricted.

When the Soviet regime took over in Russia, it abolished all titles of nobility (although at that time they did not control the whole of Russia). However, this failed to abolish their heraldic lineage, which continued. There are, therefore, a large number of noble arms, complete with supporters and helms. In the Russian Empire, arms were actively used as a symbol of one's nobility. Unlike coats of arms in other countries (such as in English heraldry), they were largely granted to the family as a whole.

Some states have State Herald Masters, which have some regulating effects.

== Heraldic Council ==
The Heraldic Council of the President of the Russian Federation (translated various ways) advises the President, and hence the State, on heraldic matters. This includes the use of official symbols, and preventing their use by non-authorised sources. It helps local and regional governments devise coats of arms. It also discusses matters, and researches heraldry in Russia. It runs, and has authority over, the State Heraldic Register.
