= Consulate General of Russia, Isfahan =

National heritage site in Isfahan, Iran

Consulate General of the Russian Federation in Isfahan
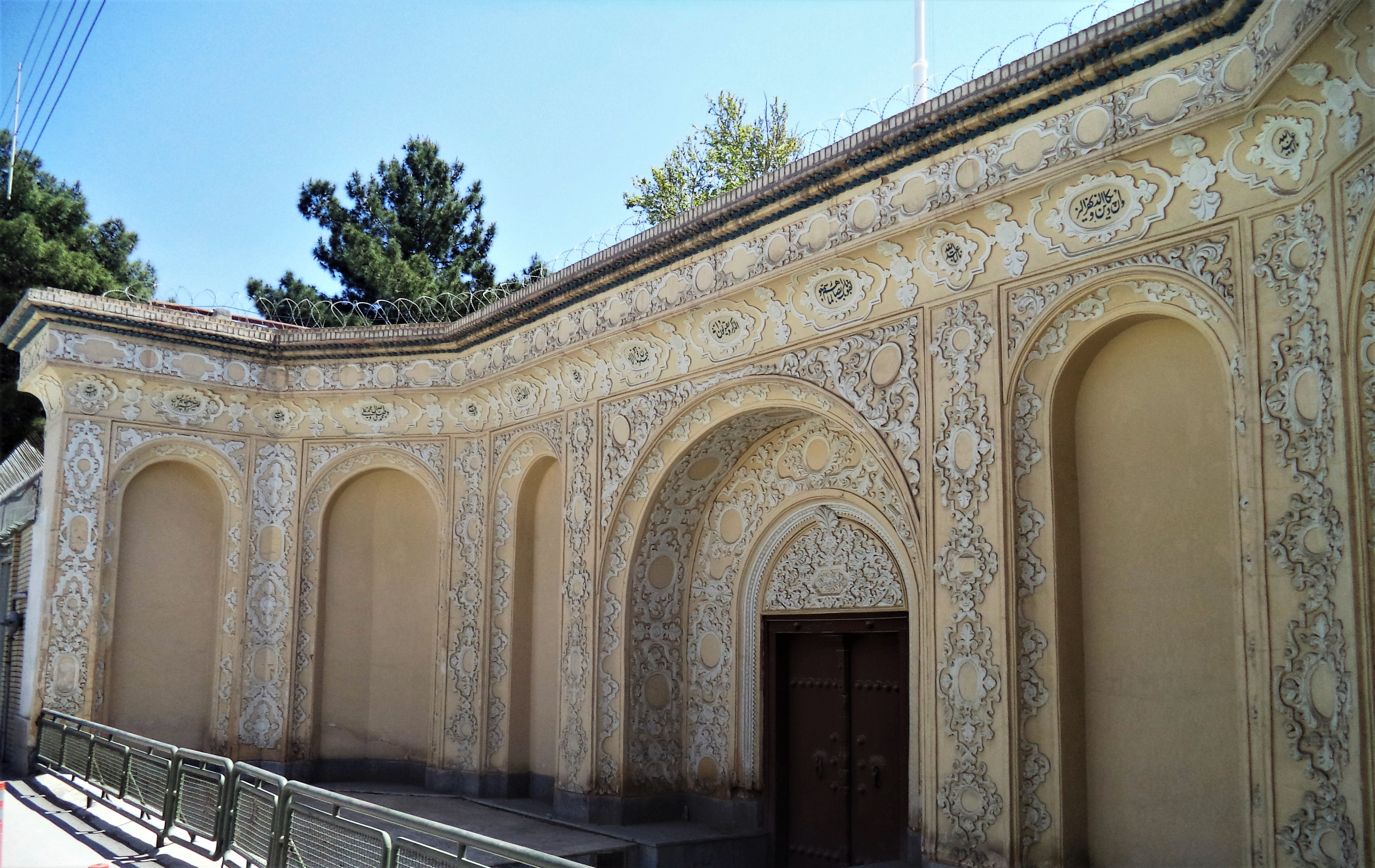
- Location: Isfahan, Iran
- Address: Takhti
- Coordinates: 32°39′39.96″N 51°40′17.52″E

Consulate General of the Russian Federation in Isfahan
- Coat of arms of Russia
- Ministry of Foreign Affairs of the Russian Federation
- Style: Consul general
- Website: isfahan.mid.ru

The Consulate General of Russia in Isfahan, Iran was built during the Qajar era and is registered on the Iran National Heritage List.

== History ==
Councilor Petr Egorovich Panafidin was appointed as the first Consul General on 18 February 1897.

== Diplomats ==
Consul General Mr. Boris Burmistrov

== Function ==
Consulate administrates visa issues.
