= Coat of arms of the Russian Empire =

- Lesser сoat of arms (Standard form)

Versions
- Greater achievement

- Middle achievement

- Lesser achievement (Variant with pavilion and supporters)
- Armiger: Emperor of Russia
- Adopted: 24 July 1882 (Greater); 23 February 1883 (Middle & Lesser)
- Relinquished: 1917
- Crest: Helmet of Alexander Nevsky with mantling sable doubled Or
- Shield: Or, a double-headed eagle sable crowned with three imperial crowns, holding a golden scepter and globus cruciger; on the breast, an escutcheon gules with Saint George slaying a dragon
- Supporters: Archangel Michael and Archangel Gabriel
- Compartment: Laurel and oak wreath
- Motto: Съ нами Богъ ("God is with us")
- Order: Collar of the Order of Saint Andrew

The coat of arms of the Russian Empire was the primary state emblem of the Russian monarchy from the proclamation of the empire in 1721 until the overthrow of the House of Romanov during the February Revolution of 1917.

Following reforms enacted by Emperor Alexander II in 1857, the emblem was officially divided into three categories: the Greater, Middle, and Lesser coats of arms. At the center of each version stood a black double-headed eagle upon a golden shield, bearing on its chest an escutcheon of Moscow with the equestrian figure of Saint George slaying a dragon. The system received its final revisions under Emperor Alexander III in 1882–1883, based on drawings executed by academician Adolf Charlemagne.

== History ==
=== Muscovite origins ===
The principal elements of the imperial coat of arms emerged during the period of the Grand Duchy of Moscow. In 1497, Grand Prince Ivan III adopted the double-headed eagle on his royal seal, an emblem influenced by Byzantine imperial traditions after his marriage to princess Sophia Palaiologina, as well as by contemporary seals of the Holy Roman Empire. On the state seal of Tsar Ivan the Terrible in 1562, the horseman slaying a dragon was positioned within an escutcheon on the chest of the eagle. In Muscovite documentation, this equestrian figure was not referred to as a saint, but rather as the secular ruler, termed the gosudar ("sovereign") or ezdets (ездец, "rider").

A third crown was placed above the heads of the eagle in 1625 under Tsar Michael Romanov. On 14 December 1667, Tsar Alexis Mikhailovich issued the first decree formally defining the state seal. The decree stated that the three crowns represented the conquered realms of Kazan, Astrakhan, and Siberia, while the scepter and globus cruciger symbolized autocracy. In 1672, the official manuscript known as the Tsarsky titulyarnik standardized the territorial emblems of Russian lands, laying the groundwork for the peripheral escutcheons used in later imperial arms.

=== 18th century ===
With the proclamation of the Russian Empire by Peter the Great in 1721, Russian heraldic practice began adopting Western European conventions. The eagle's tinctures were standardized as sable on an Or field, matching the imperial colors of the Holy Roman Empire, and the collar of the Order of Saint Andrew was suspended from the central escutcheon. In 1722, Peter created the Office of the Master of Arms (Герольдмейстерская контора), appointing Count Franz Santi to systematize state and provincial emblems. In 1730, under Empress Anna of Russia, the central equestrian figure was officially codified as Saint George in the statutory armorial compiled by General Burkhard Christoph von Münnich.

Emperor Paul I, having assumed the title of Grand Master of the Sovereign Military Order of Malta, issued an edict in 1799 placing the Maltese cross behind the breast shield of Saint George. On 16 December 1800, Paul signed a manifesto ordering a 43-quarter "Complete State Coat of Arms" incorporating all titular dominions beneath a towering domed pavilion. Following Paul's assassination in March 1801, his successor Alexander I rescinded the project on 26 April 1801, ordering the removal of the Maltese cross from state seals.

=== 19th-century reforms ===
Under Emperor Nicholas I, two variants of the eagle coexisted: an official version holding traditional regalia with provincial shields on its wings, and an Empire-style military version featuring spread wings and holding a laurel wreath, torch, and thunderbolts in its talons.

==== The Koehne reform (1856–1857) ====
In 1856, Alexander II initiated a comprehensive reform of state symbols led by Bernhard Karl von Koehne, head of the Heraldry Department. Koehne amended the arms to conform strictly to Western European rules. In earlier Russian depictions, Saint George had ridden toward heraldic sinister (the viewer's right). Because charges facing sinister represented retreat or illegitimacy in Western heraldry, Koehne reversed the horseman to face heraldic dexter (the viewer's left). The change drew sharp criticism from Slavophiles and figures such as art critic Vladimir Stasov, who argued that Koehne had distorted an authentic national tradition to fit foreign heraldic dogma.

On 11 April 1857, Alexander II confirmed the statutory decrees establishing the Greater, Middle, and Lesser State Coats of Arms, as well as personal arms for members of the imperial family. The tinctures established by Koehne's reform also prompted the decree of 11 June 1858, which introduced the black-yellow-white flag as the imperial state colors, directly reflecting the black eagle, gold shield, and white horseman.

==== The 1882–1883 reform ====
Following administrative reorganizations and the incorporation of Turkestan, Emperor Alexander III approved an updated design of the Greater Coat of Arms on 24 July 1882, drawn by Adolf Charlemagne. The official blazon was promulgated by the Governing Senate on 3 November 1882, incorporating the arms of Turkestan and reorganizing composite territorial escutcheons. The corresponding Middle and Lesser coats of arms were confirmed on 23 February 1883.

=== Abolition and legacy ===
After the February Revolution of 1917, the Russian Provisional Government removed the monarchical crowns, regalia, shields, and collar, adopting an unadorned double-headed eagle designed by artist Ivan Bilibin. The eagle was abolished following the October Revolution by the Bolshevik government, which adopted the hammer and sickle state emblem in 1918. On 30 November 1993, the coat of arms of the Russian Federation restored the double-headed eagle and the equestrian dragon-slayer, altering the colors to a golden eagle on a red field.

== Descriptions ==
=== Greater Coat of Arms ===
The Greater State Coat of Arms represented the full imperial display and served as the personal emblem of the Emperor. The central shield is golden, depicting a black double-headed eagle crowned with three imperial crowns connected by the blue ribbon of the Order of Saint Andrew. The eagle holds a golden scepter in its right talon and an orb in its left. On its breast is the red escutcheon of Moscow, showing Saint George in silver armor and an azure cape slaying a dragon.

The shield is surmounted by the helmet of Saint Alexander Nevsky with black-and-gold mantling and the Imperial Crown. It is supported by the Archangel Michael on the left and the Archangel Gabriel on the right. The entire composition is framed by an imperial pavilion of gold cloth lined with ermine, crowned by the Imperial Crown and bearing the motto «Съ нами Богъ!» ("God is with us!"). Rising above the pavilion is the State Banner (Khorugv) with the Middle State Seal, surrounded by fifteen crowned shields representing the kingdoms and principalities of the empire.

=== Middle Coat of Arms ===
The Middle State Coat of Arms shared the same central composition as the Greater arms, including the pavilion, helmet, supporters, and the wreath bearing the nine regional shields. However, it omitted the State Banner and the six composite shields above the canopy.

=== Lesser Coat of Arms ===
The Lesser State Coat of Arms depicted the crowned double-headed eagle, with the collar of the Order of Saint Andrew encircling the breast shield of Saint George. The eagle's wings bore eight regional coats of arms: the dexter (right) wing carried the arms of Kazan, Poland, Tauric Chersonesos, and the combined arms of Kiev, Vladimir, and Novgorod; while the sinister (left) wing displayed the arms of Astrakhan, Siberia, Georgia, and the Grand Duchy of Finland.

The Lesser arms were commonly used without the golden background shield. By special Imperial decree, they could also be displayed with the ermine pavilion and archangel supporters, while omitting the surrounding wreath and provincial shields.

== See also ==
- Coat of arms of Russia
- Black-yellow-white flag of the Russian Empire
- State Emblem of the Soviet Union
- Double-headed eagle
