= Coat of arms of Russia =

Versions
- Charge
- Armiger: Russian Federation
- Adopted: 30 November 1993 (current version)
- Crest: Imperial crown of Russia
- Shield: Saint George and the Dragon
- Supporters: Double-headed eagle
- Other elements: Scepter and globus cruciger
- Designer: Yevgeny Ukhnalyov

The coat of arms of Russia (Note: Russian: Государственный герб Российской Федерации, romanized: Gosudarstvennyy gerb Rossiyskoy Federatsii, lit. 'State Coat of Arms of the Russian Federation') is one of the state symbols of the Russian Federation, along with the state flag and the national anthem. The current coat of arms was approved by Decree No. 2050 of the President of the Russian Federation dated on 30 November 1993. On 25 December 2000, President of Russia Vladimir Putin signed the Federal Constitutional Law No. 2 "On the State Coat of Arms of the Russian Federation" which had retained the 1993 version as the state symbol and approved the rules for its use.

It derives from the earlier coat of arms of the Russian Empire. Though modified more than once since the reign of Ivan III (1462–1505), the current coat of arms is directly derived from its medieval original, with the double-headed eagle having Byzantine and earlier antecedents. The general tincture corresponds to the fifteenth-century standard.

== Description and usage ==
The two main elements of Russian state symbols (the two-headed eagle and Saint George slaying the dragon) predate Peter the Great. According to the Kremlin's website:

«...четырёхугольный, с закруглёнными нижними углами, заострённый в оконечности красный геральдический щит с золотым двуглавым орлом, поднявшим вверх распущенные крылья. Орел увенчан двумя малыми коронами и — над ними — одной большой короной, соединенными лентой. В правой лапе орла — скипетр, в левой — держава. На груди орла, в красном щите, — серебряный всадник в синем плаще на серебряном коне, поражающий серебряным копьём черного опрокинутого навзничь и попранного конём дракона.»

Which is translated as:

"… a gold two-headed eagle with raised extended wings set against a four-cornered red heraldic shield with rounded lower corners. Two small crowns top the eagle's heads, with one large crown above them. The three crowns are linked by a ribbon. The eagle holds a sceptre in its right claw and an orb in its left claw. The eagle bears a red shield on its breast depicting a silver horseman in a blue cape, mounted upon a silver horse and slaying a black dragon with a silver spear."

The current coat of arms was designed by artist Yevgeny Ukhnalyov; it was adopted on 30 November 1993 by a presidential decree, and then by a federal law signed by President Vladimir Putin on December 20, 2000.

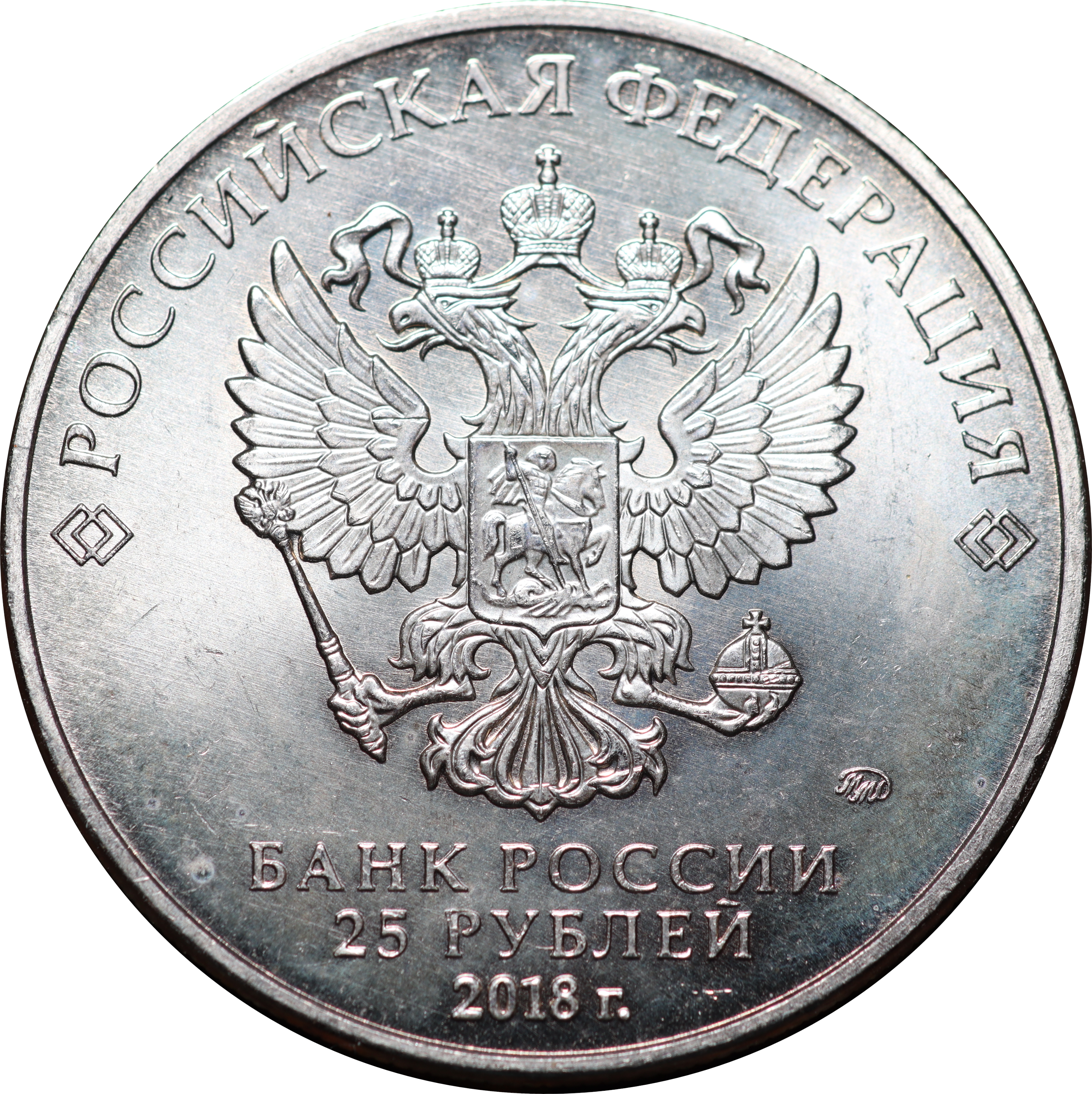
Arms emblazoned on the 2018 25 ruble coin

Today, the imperial crowns on each head stand for the unity and sovereignty of Russia, both as a whole and in its constituent republics and regions. The orb and scepter grasped in the eagle's talons are traditional heraldic symbols of sovereign power and authority. Of note is that the scepter shows the Droste effect, as it is topped by a miniature image of the coat-of-arms itself. They have been retained in the modern Russian arms despite the fact that the Russian Federation is not a monarchy, which led to objections by the Communists even though both the blue ribbon and the collar of the Order of St. Andrew (which in the imperial arms supported the three crowns and surrounded the central shield) have been removed from the current coat of arms.

It appears on the federal buildings and is on the cover of the national passport.

The standard of the president of Russia is a squared Russian tricolour defaced with the coat of arms of Russia, the banner of the Russian Armed Forces also has the coat of arms centered on the obverse side. Some state awards of Russia are also designed based on the coat of arms, including the State Prize. Russian ruble coins depict the coat of arms on the obverse side since 2016.

=== Differences between 1993 and 2000 descriptions ===
The description of the coat of arms of Russia in the Regulation of the same name, approved by the Decree of the President of Russia of November 30, 1993, No. 2050 "On the State Emblem of the Russian Federation," differs from the description of the coat of arms of Russia in the Federal Constitutional Law No. 2 of December 25, 2000 "On the State Emblem of the Russian Federation". However, both regulatory legal acts contain the same drawing of the state emblem by artist Yevgeny Ukhnalyov in their appendices.

Element of the coat of arms	Description in the "Regulation…" of 1993	Description in the 2000 law
Heraldic Shield	Red Heraldic Shield	A quadrangular red heraldic shield with rounded lower corners and a pointed tip.
Double-Headed Eagle	Golden Double-Headed Eagle	A golden double-headed eagle with its wings spread upwards.
Crowns Above the Eagle	The three historical crowns of Peter the Great (two small crowns above the heads and one larger crown above them)	The eagle is crowned with two small crowns and one large crown above them, connected by a ribbon.
Items in the Eagle's Claws	The eagle holds a scepter and orb.	The eagle holds a scepter in its right claw and an orb in its left.
Horseman	Horseman	A silver horseman in a blue cloak on a silver horse.
Horseman's Spear	Spear	Silver Spear
Dragon	Dragon	A black dragon, thrown backwards and trampled by a horse

== Historical versions ==
The heraldic device of Russia has gone through three major periods in its history, undergoing major changes in the transitions between the Russian Empire, the Soviet Union, and the Russian Federation. The use of the double-headed eagle as a Russian coat of arms goes back to the 15th century. With the fall of Constantinople and the end of the Byzantine Empire in 1453, the Grand Dukes of Muscovy came to see themselves as the successors of the Byzantine heritage, a notion reinforced by the marriage of Ivan III to Sophia Paleologue (hence the expression "Third Rome" for Moscow and, by extension, for the whole of Imperial Russia). Ivan adopted the golden Byzantine double-headed eagle in his seal, first documented in 1472, marking his direct claim to the Roman imperial heritage and posing as a sovereign equal and rival to the Holy Roman Empire. In 1497, it was stamped on a charter of share and allotment of independent princes' possessions. At about the same time, the image of a gilt, double-headed eagle on a red background appeared on the walls of the Palace of Facets in the Moscow Kremlin.

The other main Russian coat of arms, the image of St George slaying the dragon, is contemporaneous. In its first form, as a rider armed with a spear, it is found in the seal of Vasili I of Moscow in 1390. At the time of Ivan III, the dragon was added, but the final association with Saint George was not made until 1730, when it was described as such in an Imperial decree. Eventually, St George became the patron saint of Moscow (and, by extension, of Russia).

After the assumption of the title of Tsar by Ivan IV, the two coats are found combined, with the eagle bearing an escutcheon depicting St George on the breast. With the establishment of the Moscow Patriarchate in 1589, a patriarchal cross was added for a time between the heads of the eagle.

=== 1721–1917: Russian Empire ===
The coat of arms of the Russian Empire was the primary state emblem of the Russian monarchy from the proclamation of the empire in 1721 until the overthrow of the House of Romanov during the February Revolution of 1917.

Following reforms enacted by Emperor Alexander II in 1857, the emblem was officially divided into three categories: the Greater, Middle, and Lesser coats of arms. At the center of each version stood a black double-headed eagle upon a golden shield, bearing on its chest an escutcheon of Moscow with the equestrian figure of Saint George slaying a dragon. The system received its final revisions under Emperor Alexander III in 1882–1883, based on drawings executed by academician Adolf Charlemagne.

=== 1918–93: Soviet and post-Soviet Russia ===
The coat of arms of the Russian Soviet Federative Socialist Republic (RSFSR) was adopted on 10 July 1918 by the government of the Russian Soviet Federative Socialist Republic (Soviet Union), and modified several times afterwards. It shows wheat as the symbol of agriculture, a rising sun for the future of the Russian nation, the red star (the RSFSR was the last Soviet Republic to include the star in its state emblem, in 1978) as well as the hammer and sickle for the victory of Communism and the "world-wide socialist community of states".

The Soviet Union state motto ("Workers of the world, unite!") in Russian ('Пролетарии всех стран, соединяйтесь!' — Proletarii vsekh stran, soyedinyaytes!) is also a part of the coat of arms.

The acronym of the RSFSR is shown above the hammer and sickle, and reads 'PCФCP', for "Российская Советская Федеративная Социалистическая Республика" (lit. 'Russian Soviet Federative Socialist Republic').

Similar emblems were used by the Autonomous Socialist Soviet Republics (ASSR) within the Russian SFSR; the main differences were generally the use of the republic's acronym and the presence of the motto in the language(s) of the titular nations (with the exception of the state emblem of the Dagestan ASSR, which had the motto in eleven languages as there is no single Dagestani language).

The Soviet Union as a whole adopted its emblem in 1923, which remained in use until the dissolution of the Soviet Union in 1991. Although it is technically an emblem rather than a coat of arms, since it does not follow traditional heraldic rules, in Russian it is called герб (gerb), the word used for a traditional coat of arms. It was the first state insignia created in the style known as socialist heraldry, a style also seen in e.g. the Chinese national emblem.

The emblem shows the Soviet emblems of the Hammer and Sickle and the Red Star over a globe, in the center of a wreath wrapped in ribbons emblazoned with the communist motto ("Workers of the world, unite!") in the official languages of the Soviet republics with the Russian inscription in the centre, in the reverse order they were mentioned in the Soviet Constitution. Each Soviet Republic (SSR) and Autonomous Soviet Republic (ASSR) had its own coat of arms, largely inspired by the state emblem of the Union.

Four versions were used: 6 ribbons were used in 1923, which were written on in Russian, Ukrainian, Belarusian, Georgian, Armenian, and Azerbaijani; 11 ribbons with the addition of Turkmen, Uzbek, Tajik, Kazakh, Kyrgyz; 16 with the addition of Estonian, Latvian, Lithuanian, Moldavian, and Finnish. Finally, the inscriptions in Azerbaijani, Turkmen, Uzbek, Tajik, Kazakh and Kyrgyz were updated to reflect their transition from the Latin to the Cyrillic script. The final version of the emblem was adopted in 1956 with the removal of the Finnish inscription from the insignia, reflecting the 1956 transformation of the Karelo-Finnish SSR into the Karelian ASSR.

In 1992, the inscription was changed from RSFSR ('РСФСР') to the Russian Federation ('Российская Федерация') in connection with the change of the name of the state. In 1993, president Boris Yeltsin signed a decree to replace the Communist design by the present coat of arms.

=== Evolution ===
1094–1132: Seal of
Mstislav I Monomakh

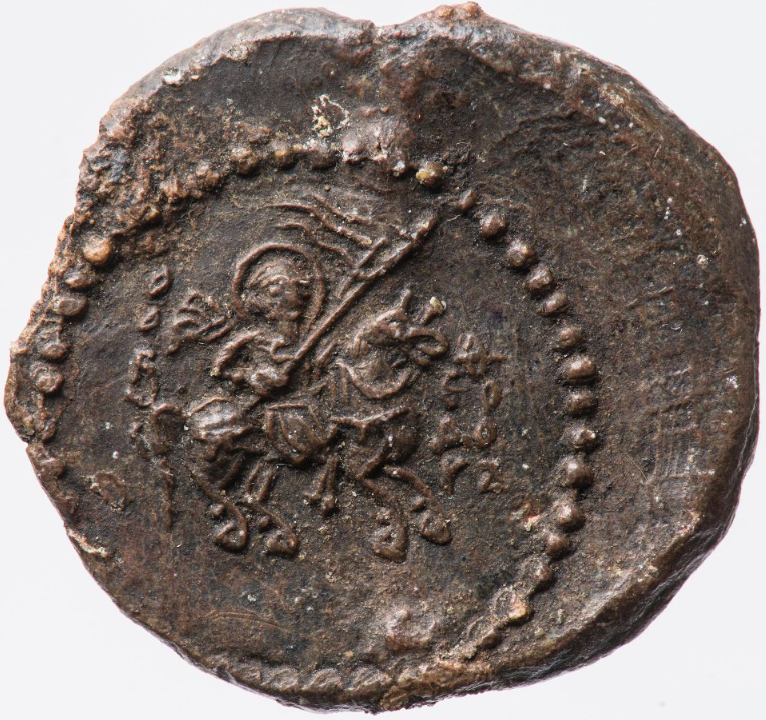
1209–1227: Seal of
Mstislav Mstislavich

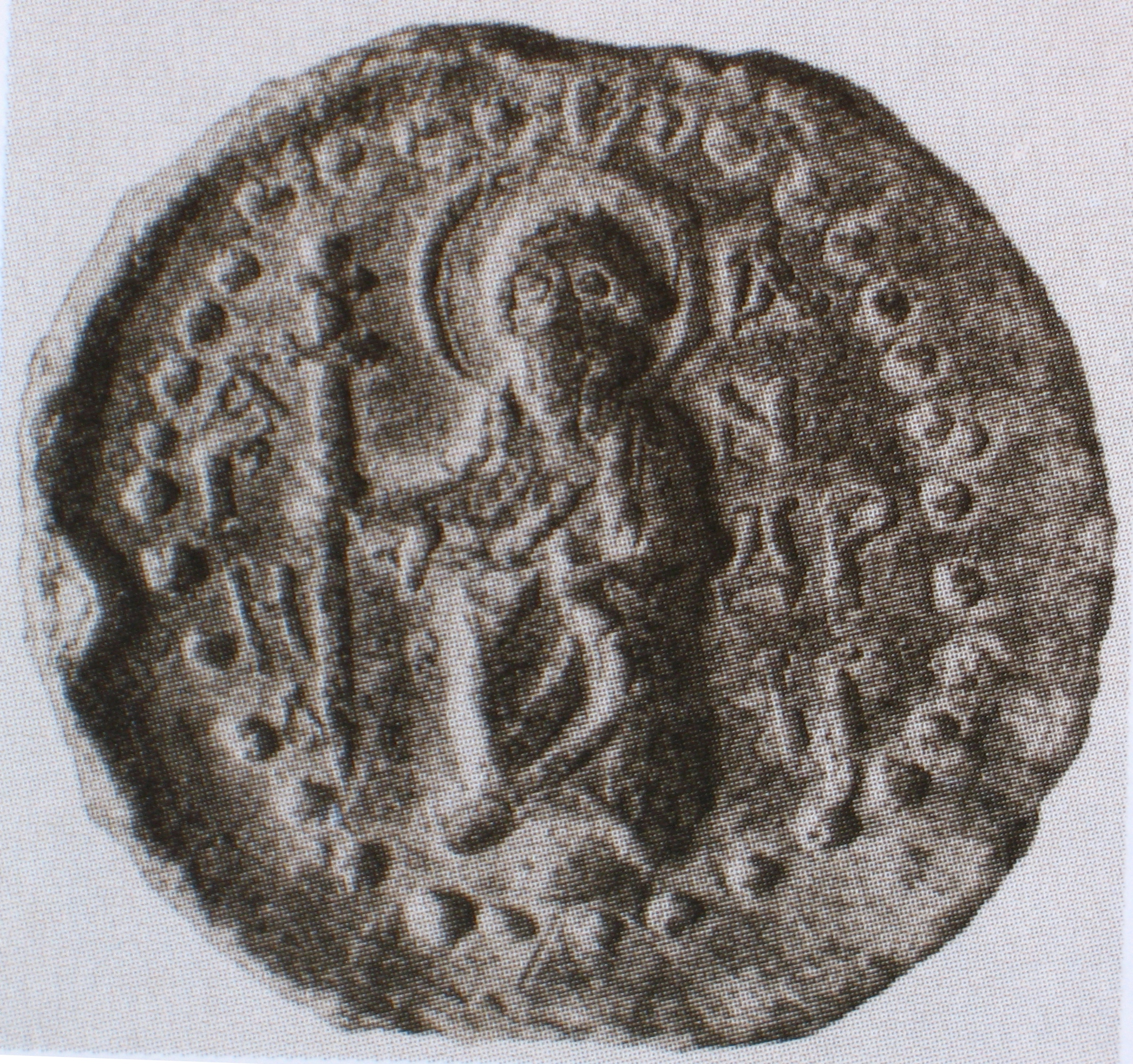
1200–1252: Seal of
Sviatoslav III of Vladimir

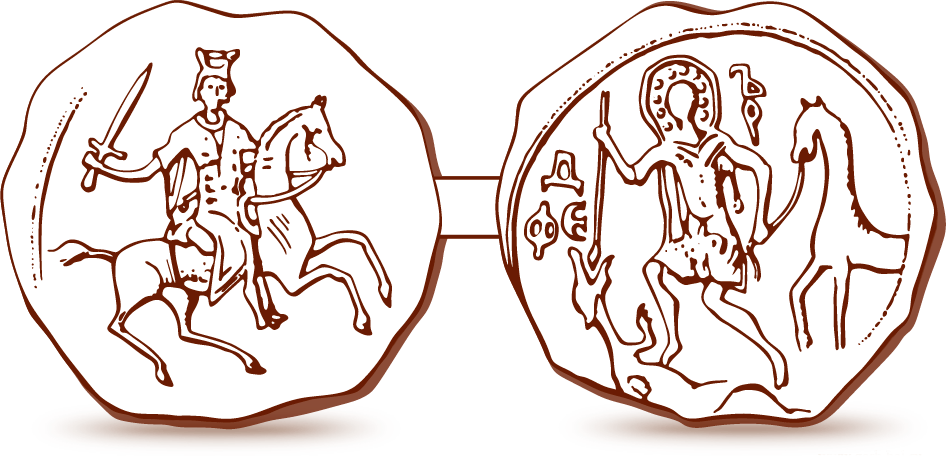
1236–1263: Seal of
Alexander Nevsky (Theodore Stratelates slaying the giant serpent)

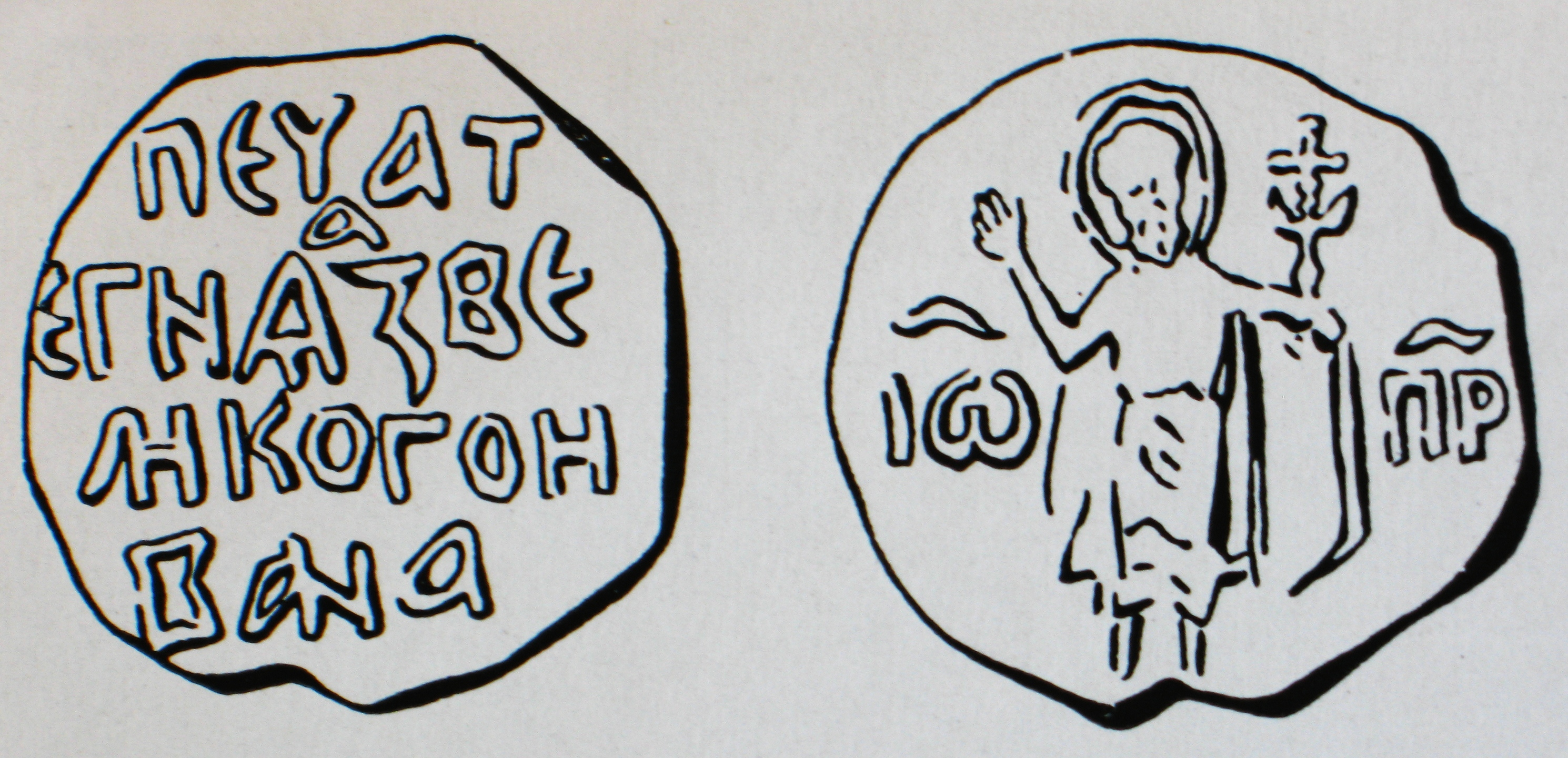
1325–1340: Seal of
Ivan I

1359–1389: Seal of
Dmitry Donskoy

1389–1425: Seal of
Vasily I

1425–1462: Seal of
Vasily II

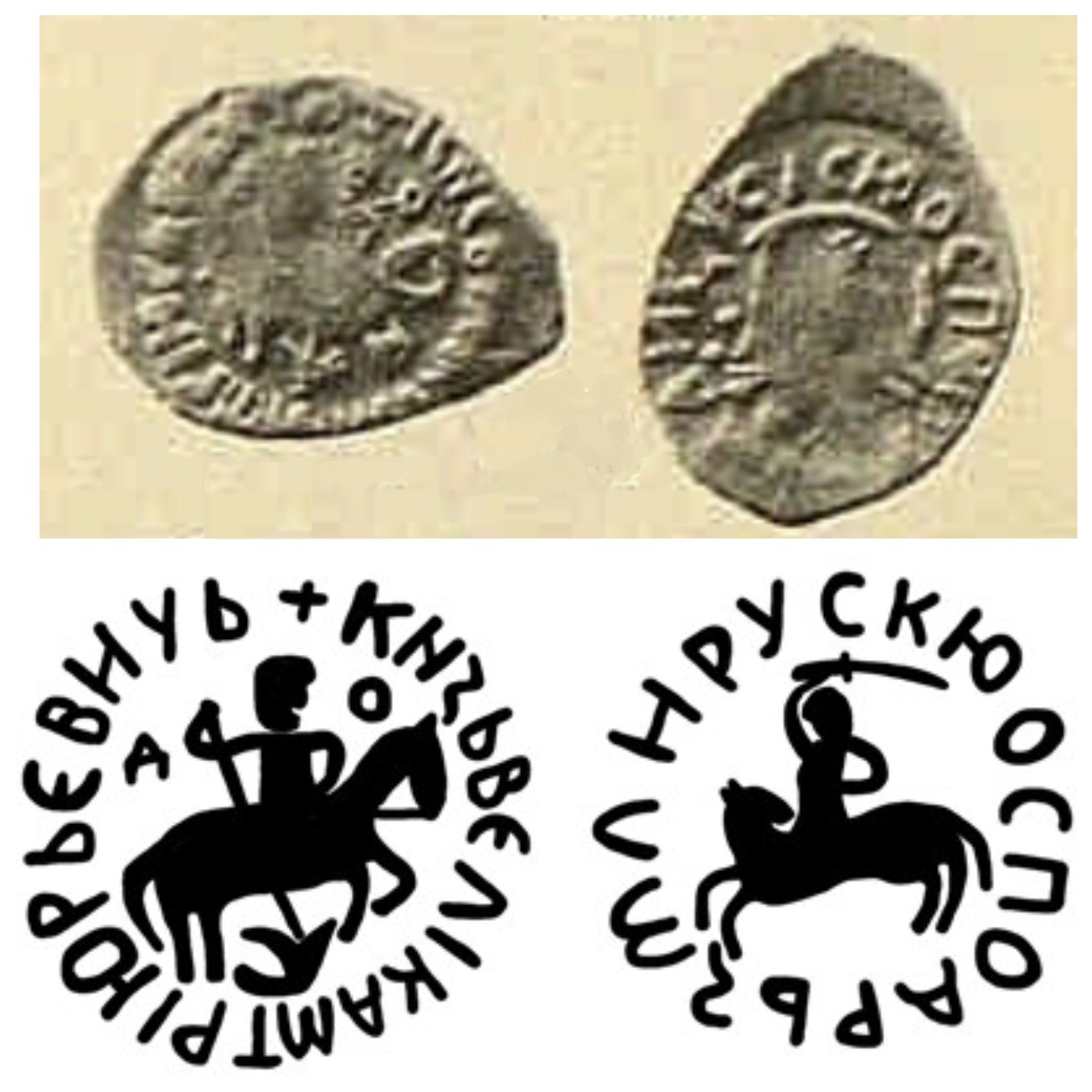
1446–1447: Silver coin of
Dmitry Shemyaka

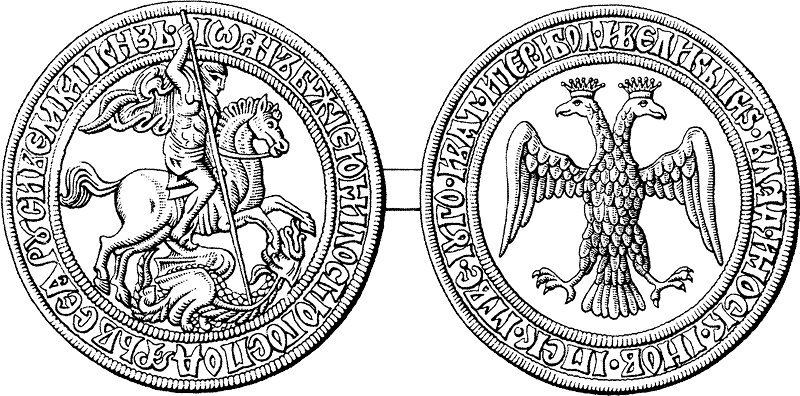
1472–1502: Seal of
Ivan III the Great

1539: Seal of
Ivan IV the Terrible
1533–1584

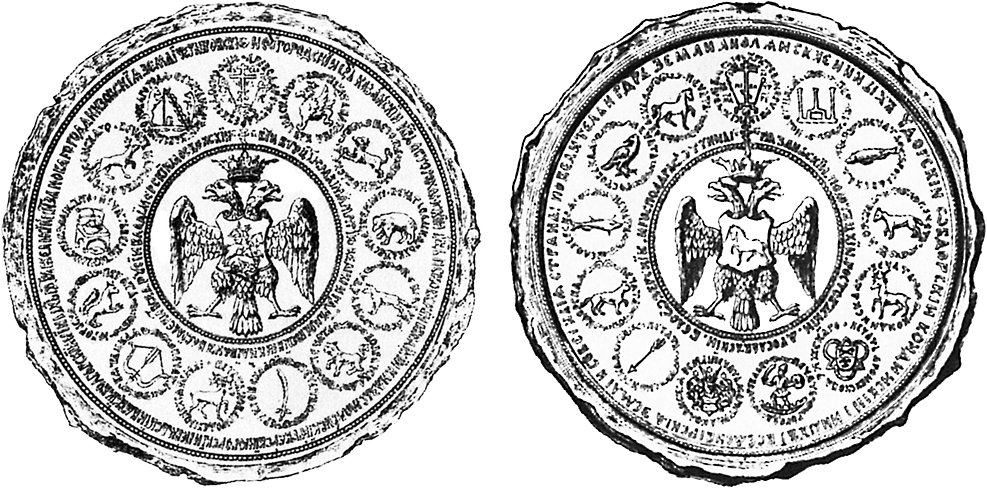
1577: Greater seal of
Ivan IV the Terrible
1533–1584

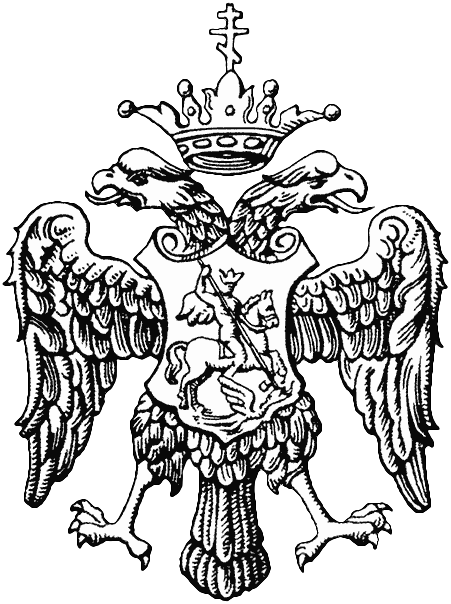
1577: Coat of arms
under Ivan IV
1533–1584

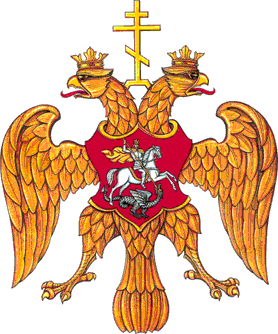
1584–1667: Coat of arms of the Tsardom of Russia

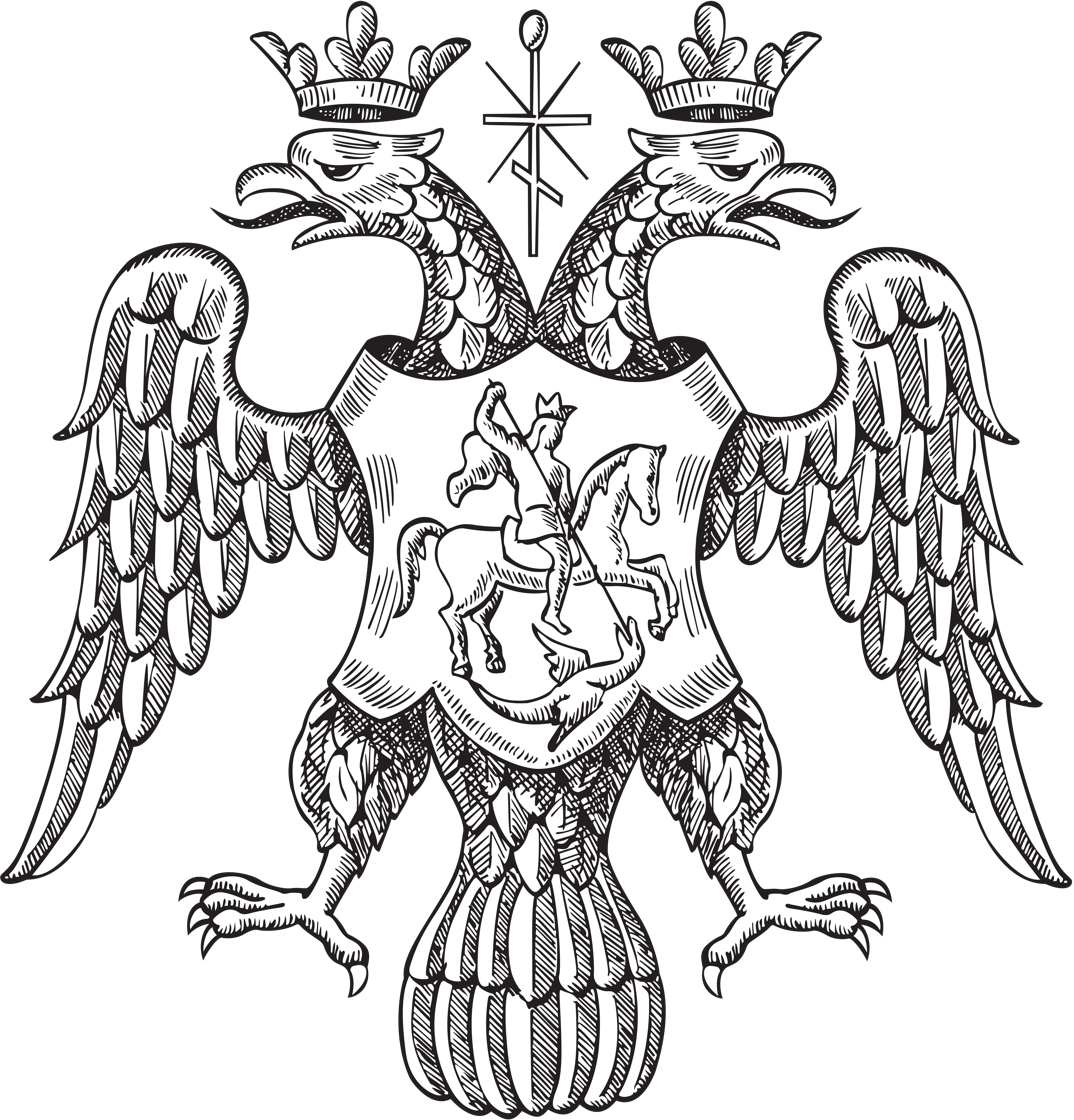
1584–1598: Seal of
Feodor I

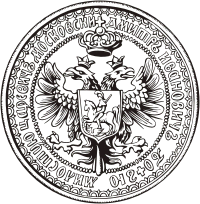
1605: Seal of
False Dmitry I

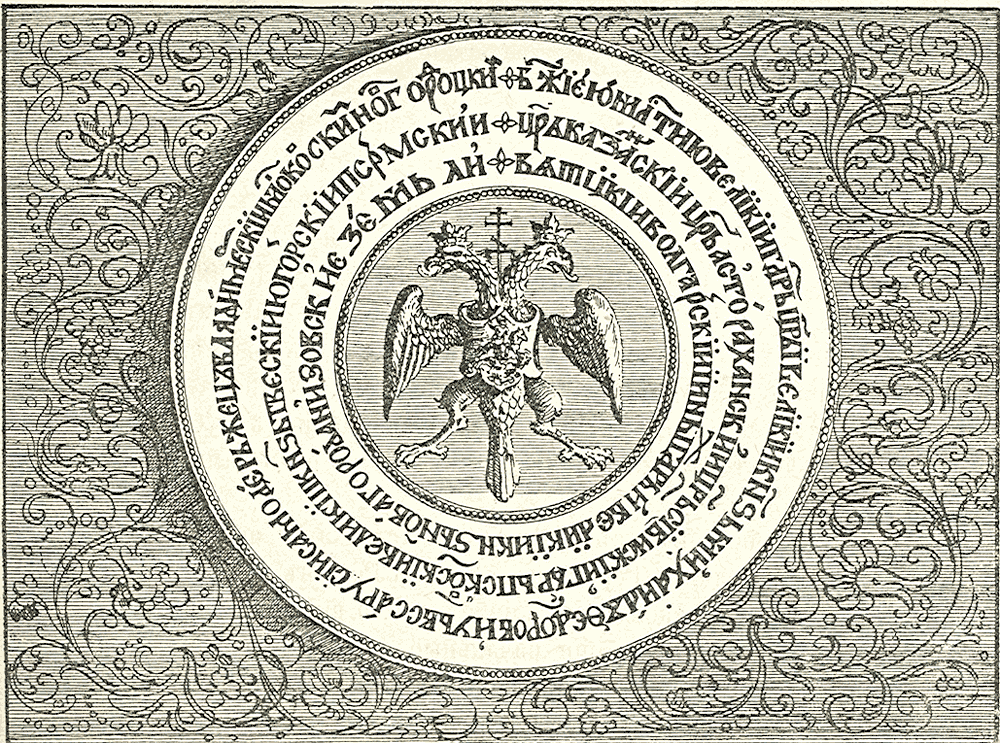
1613–1645: Seal of
Michael

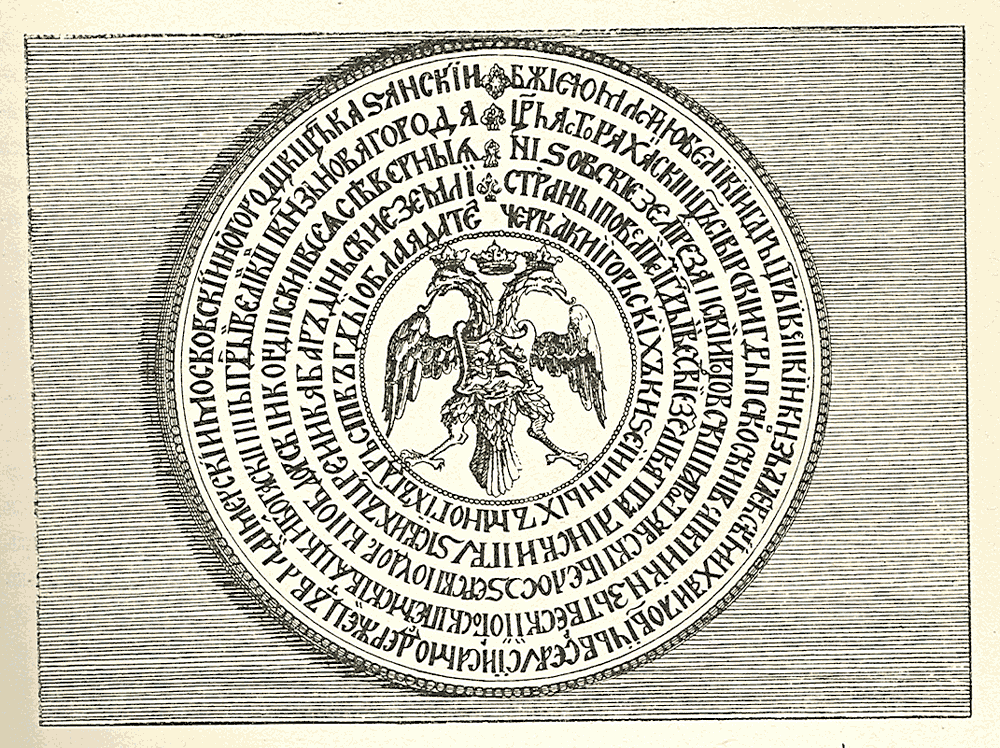
1645–1654: Seal of
Alexis

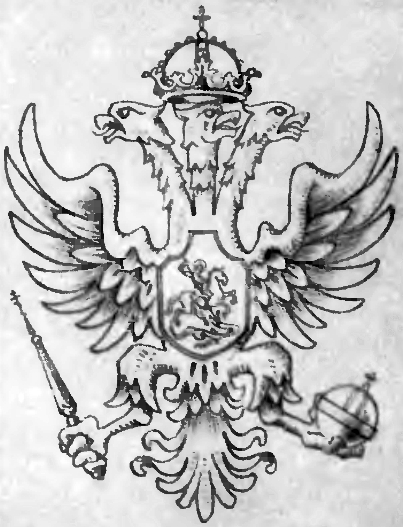
1654: Variant coat of arms
under Alexis (after Pereiaslav Agreement)

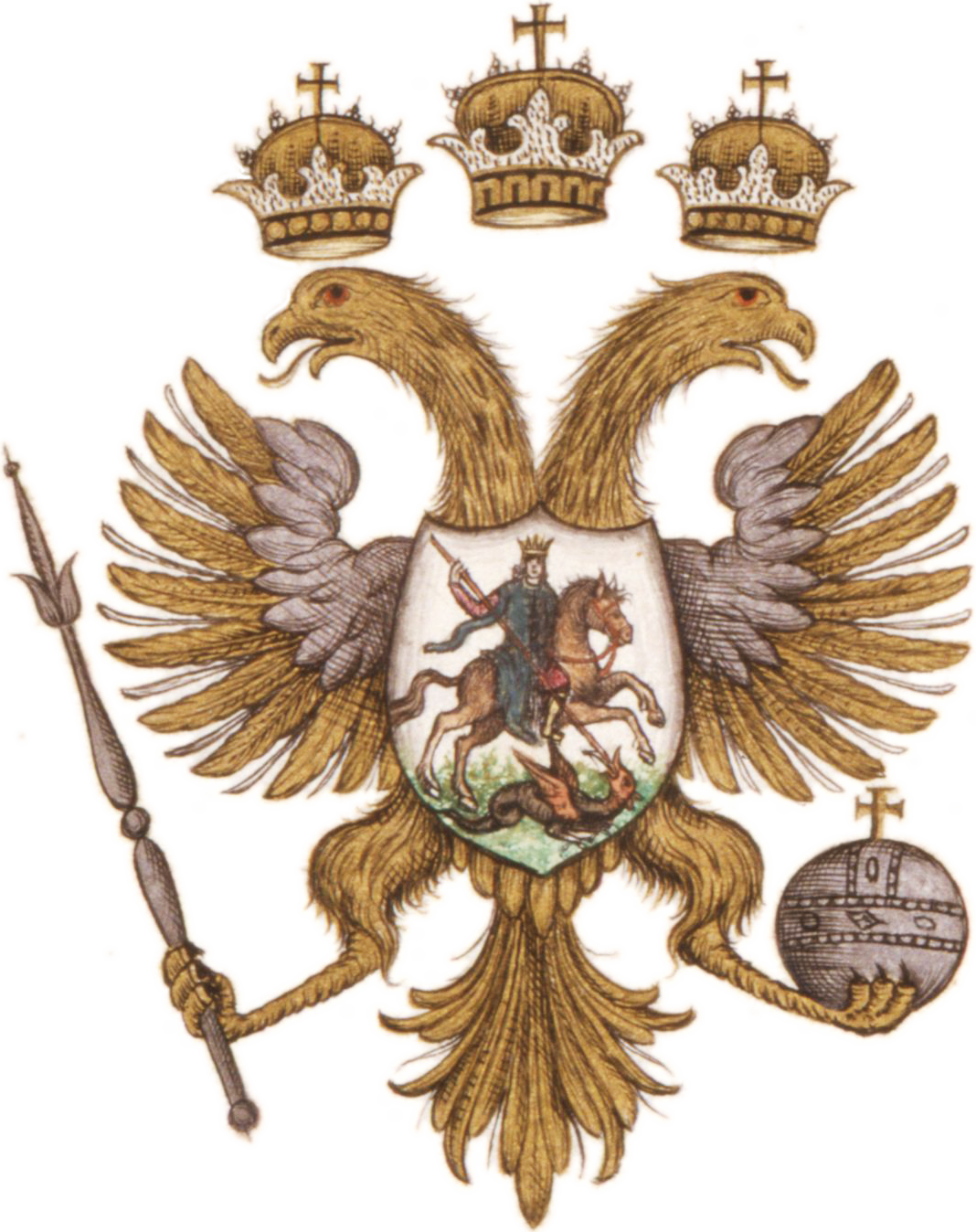
1667–1721: Coat of arms of the Tsardom of Russia

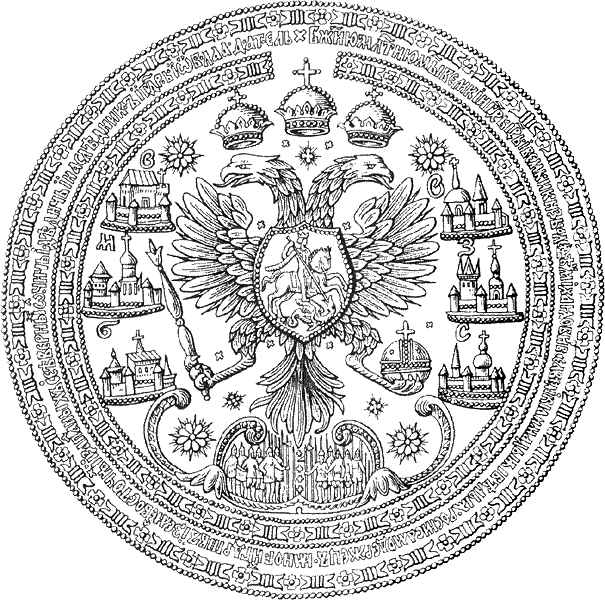
1667–1676: Seal of
Alexis

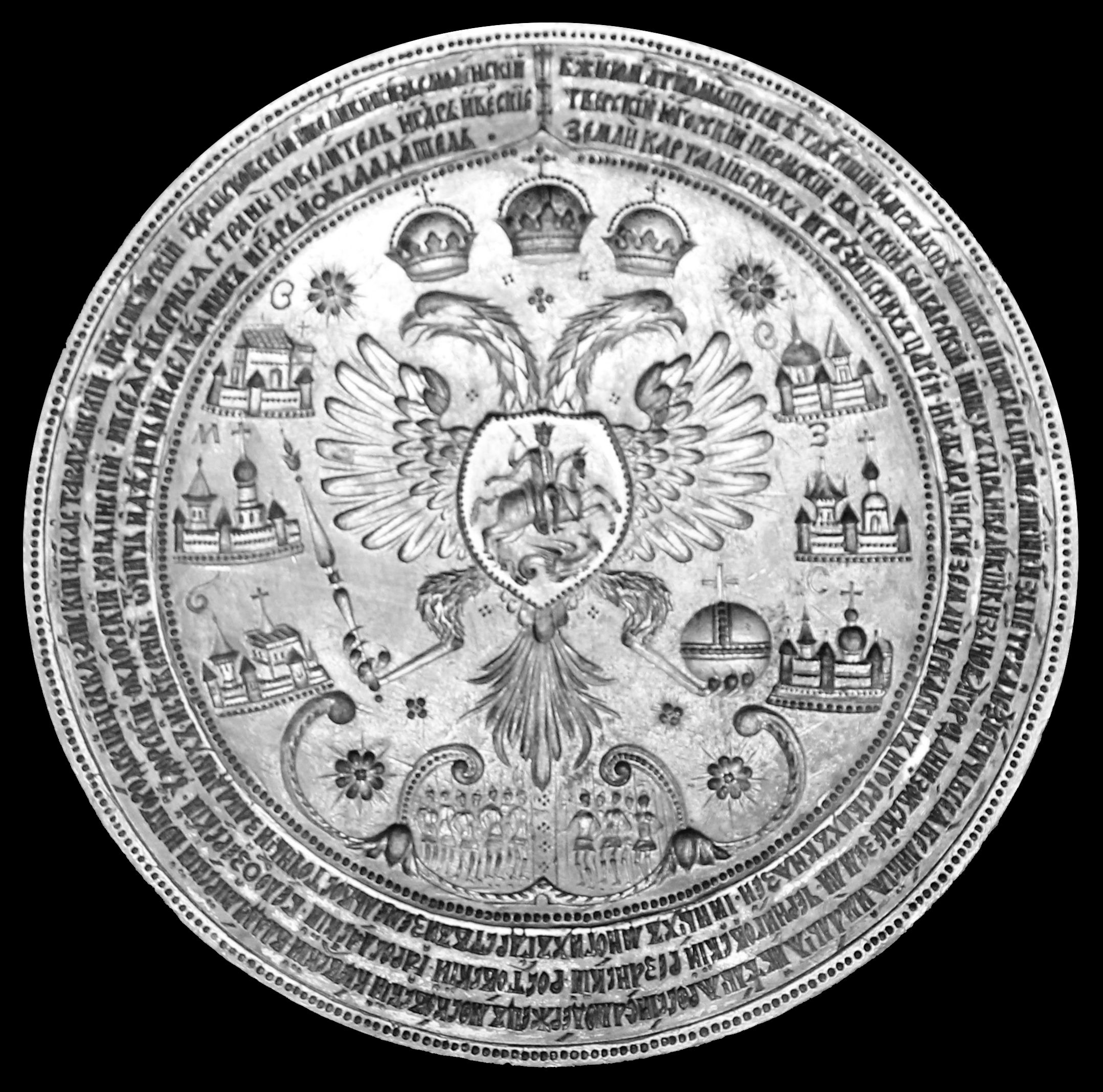
1682–1696: Seal of
Peter I

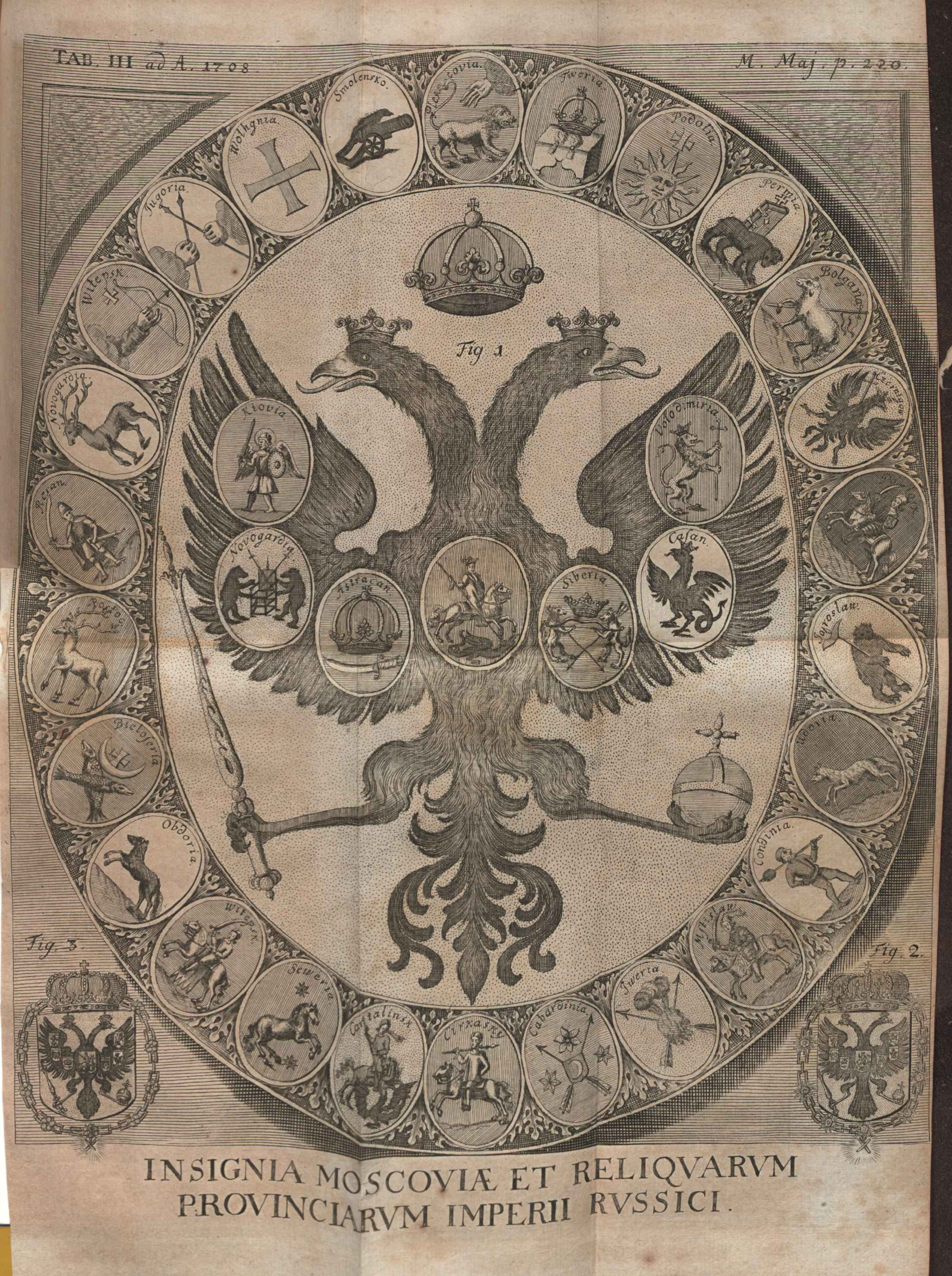
1698–1699: Sketch of seal under Peter I (by Johann Georg Korb)

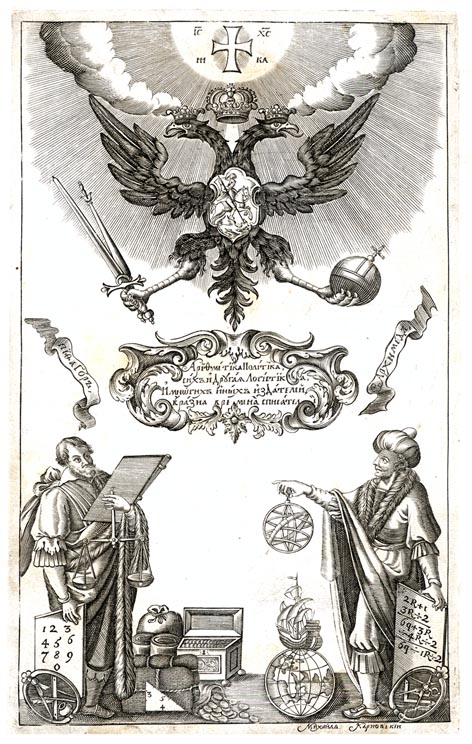
1703: Coat of arms
under Peter I (published in the book Arithmetic)

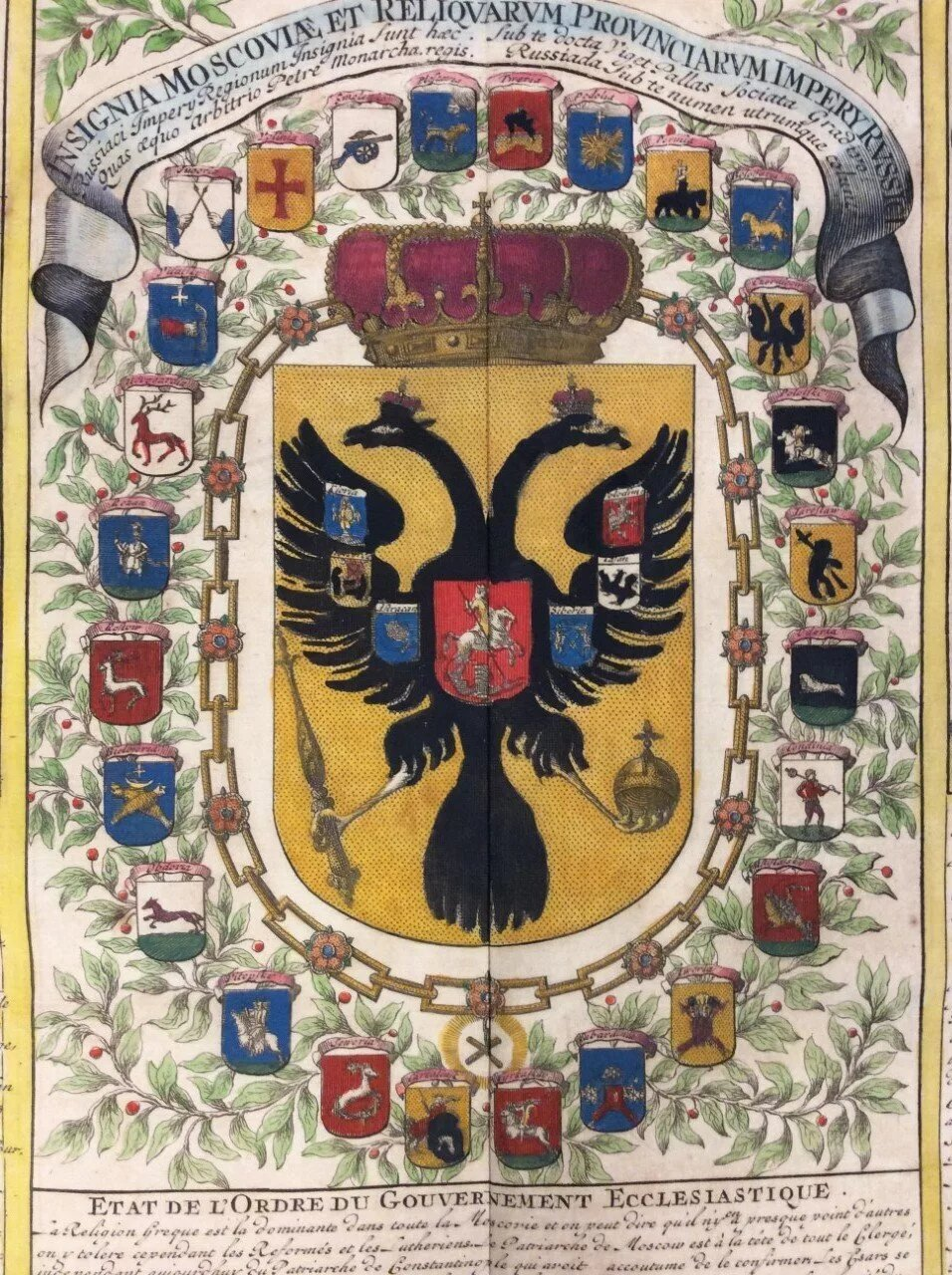
1714–1720:Coat of arms
under Peter I

1721–1725: Imperial coat of arms under Peter the Great

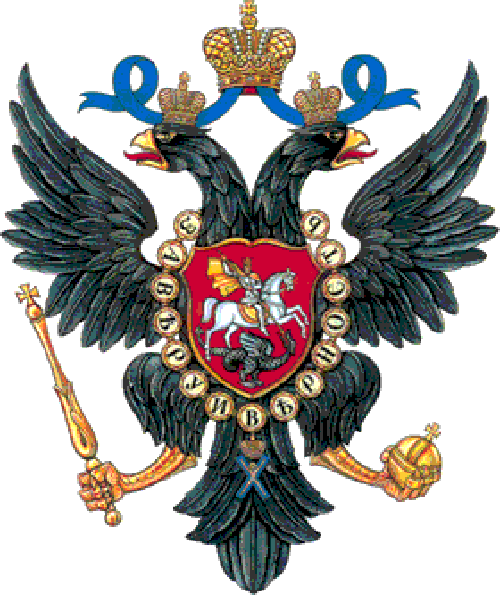
1725–1727: Imperial coat of arms under Catherine I

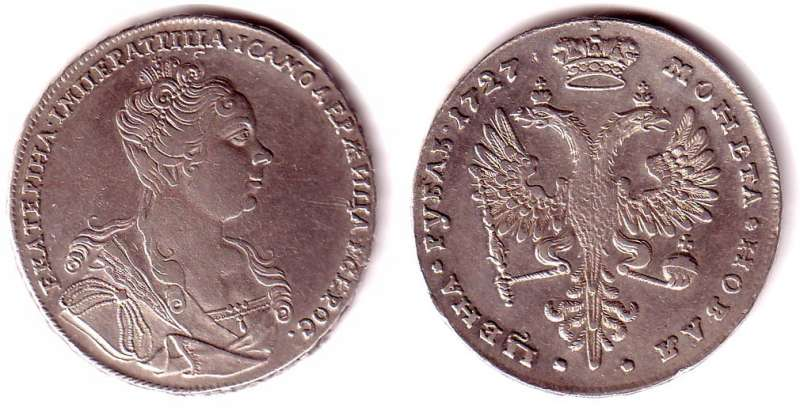
1725–1727: Silver ruble under Catherine I

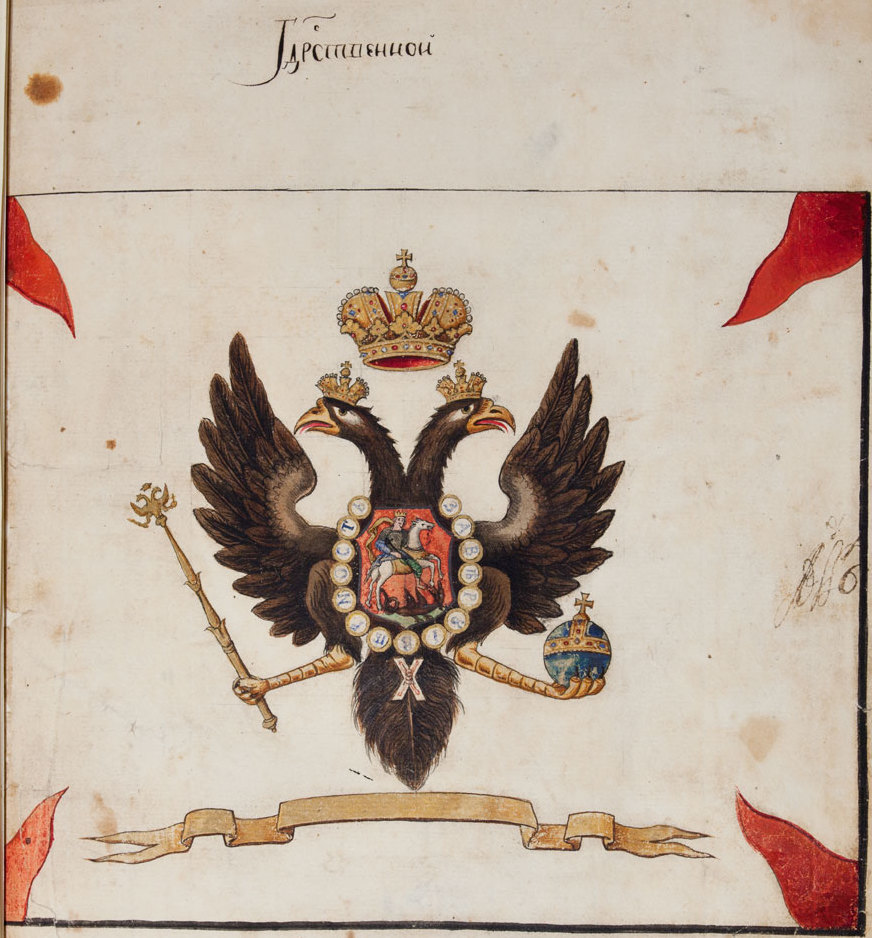
1727–1730: Imperial coat of arms under Peter II

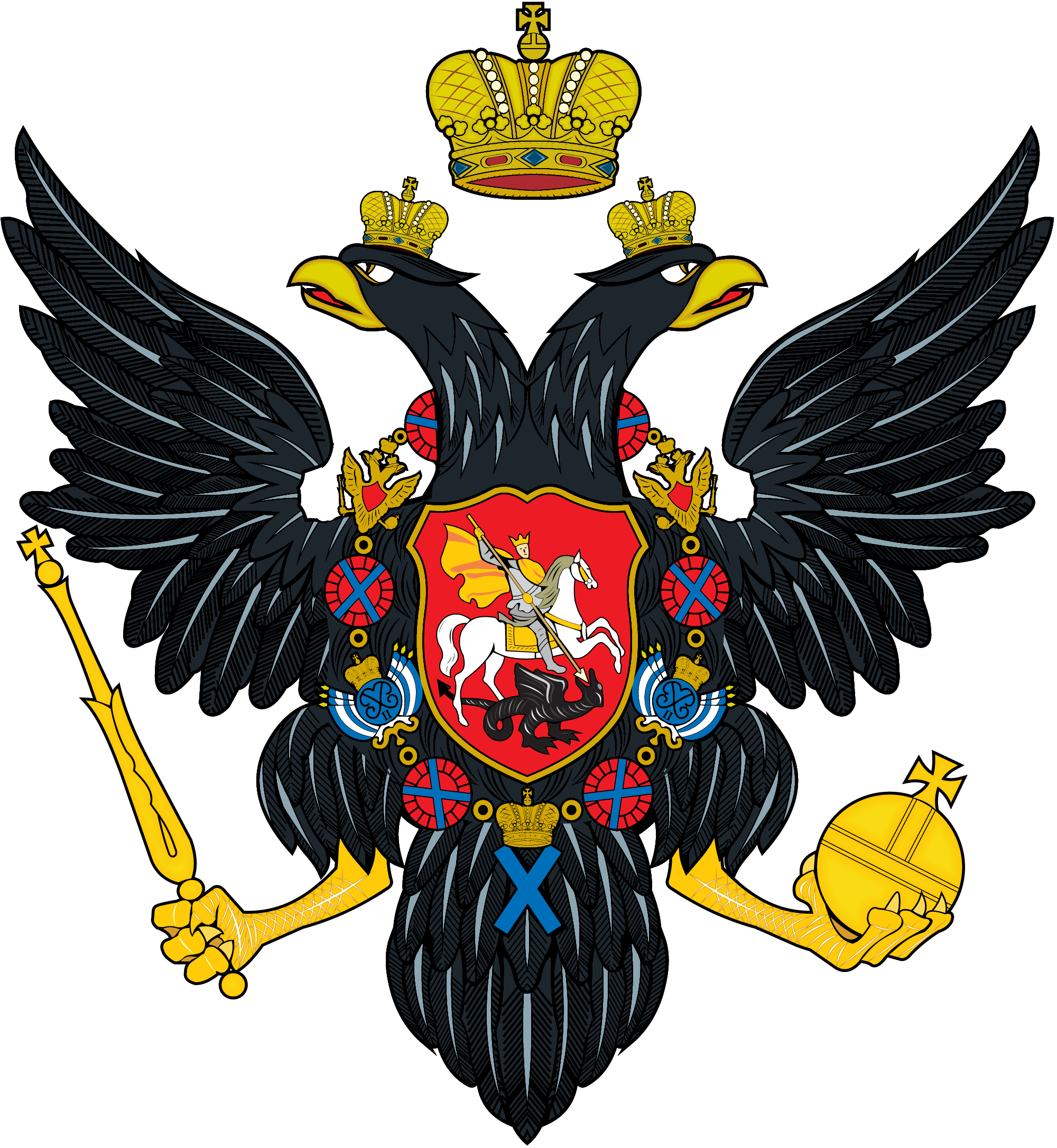
1730–1798, 1801–1825: Imperial coat of arms under Anna, Ivan VI, Elizabeth, Peter III, Catherine the Great and Alexander I

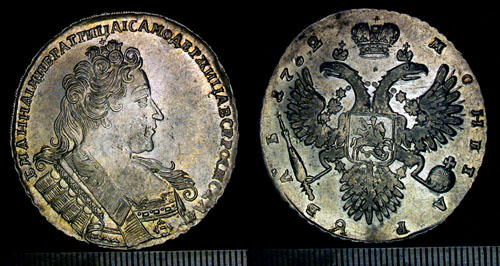
1730–1737: Silver ruble under Anna

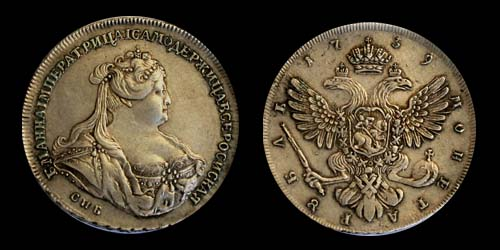
1737–1740: Silver ruble under Anna

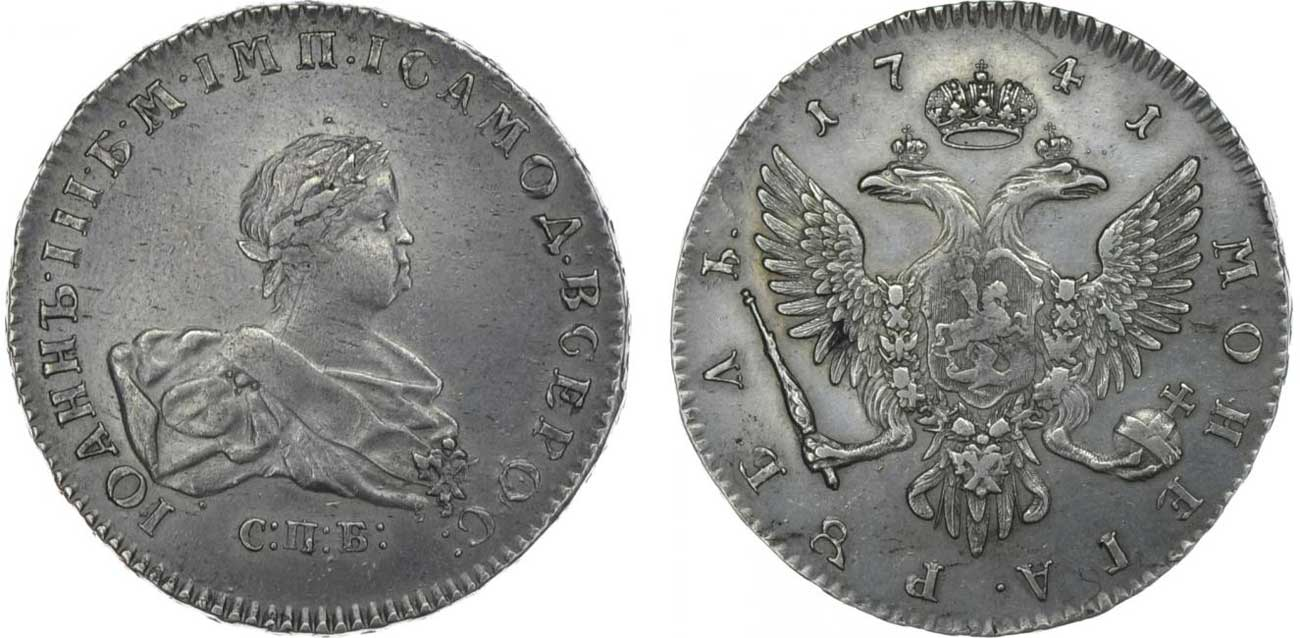
1741: Silver ruble under
Ivan VI

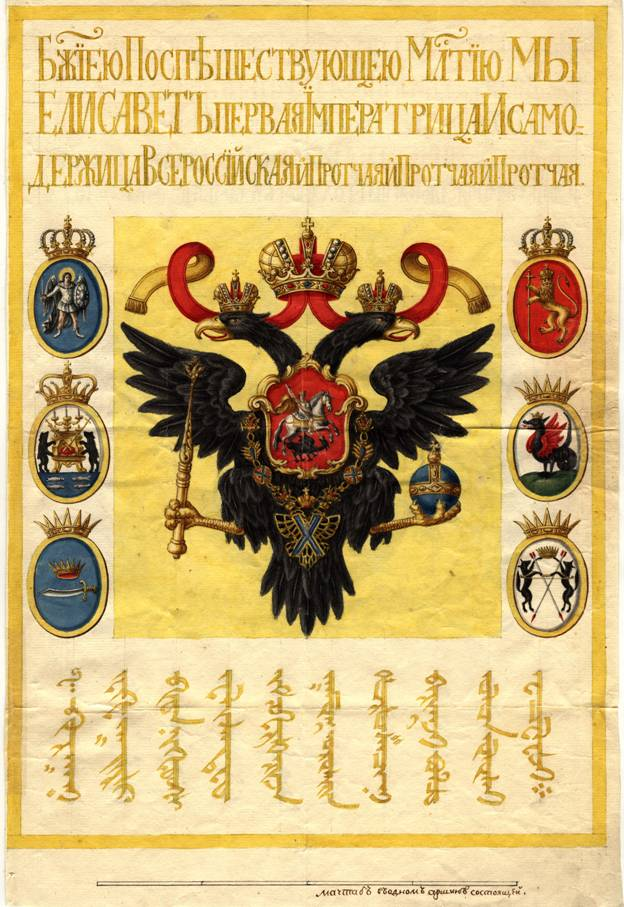
1741–1762: Imperial coat of arms under Elizabeth

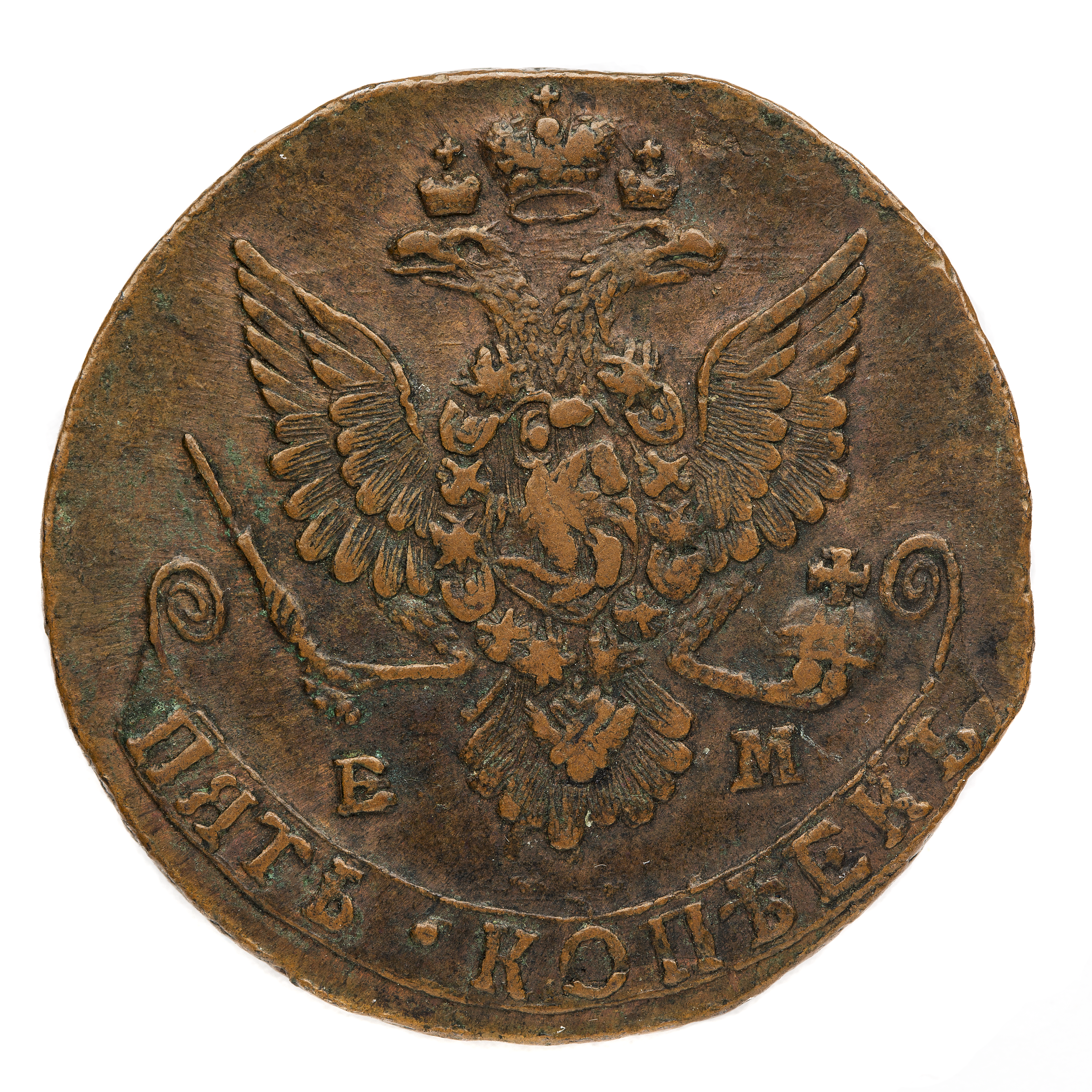
1758–1796: Copper coin of 5 kopecks under Elizabeth and Catherine the Great

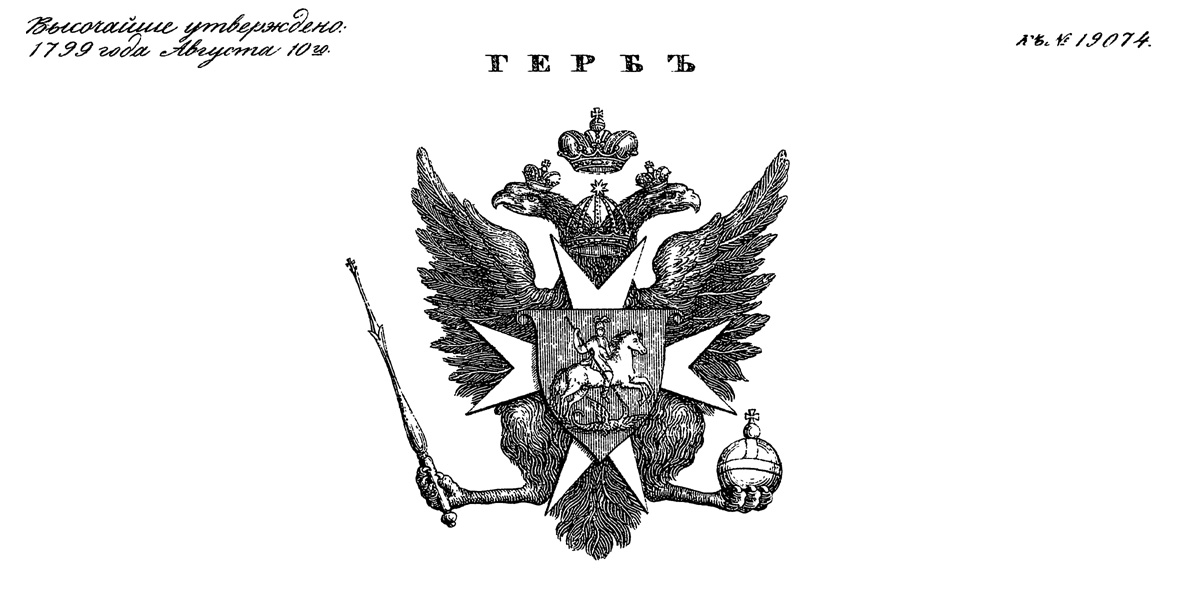
1799–1801: Imperial coat of arms under Paul I

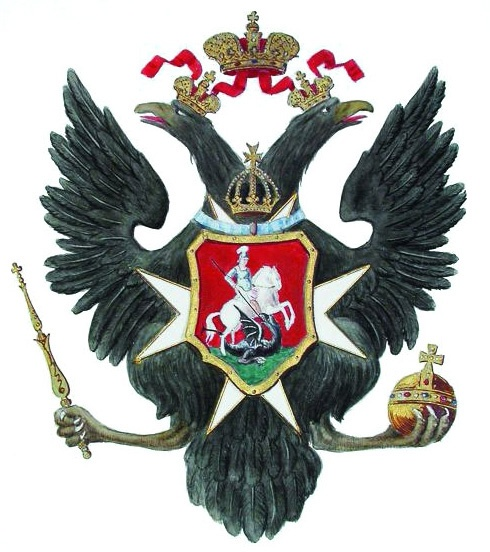
1799–1801: Variant coat of arms under Paul I

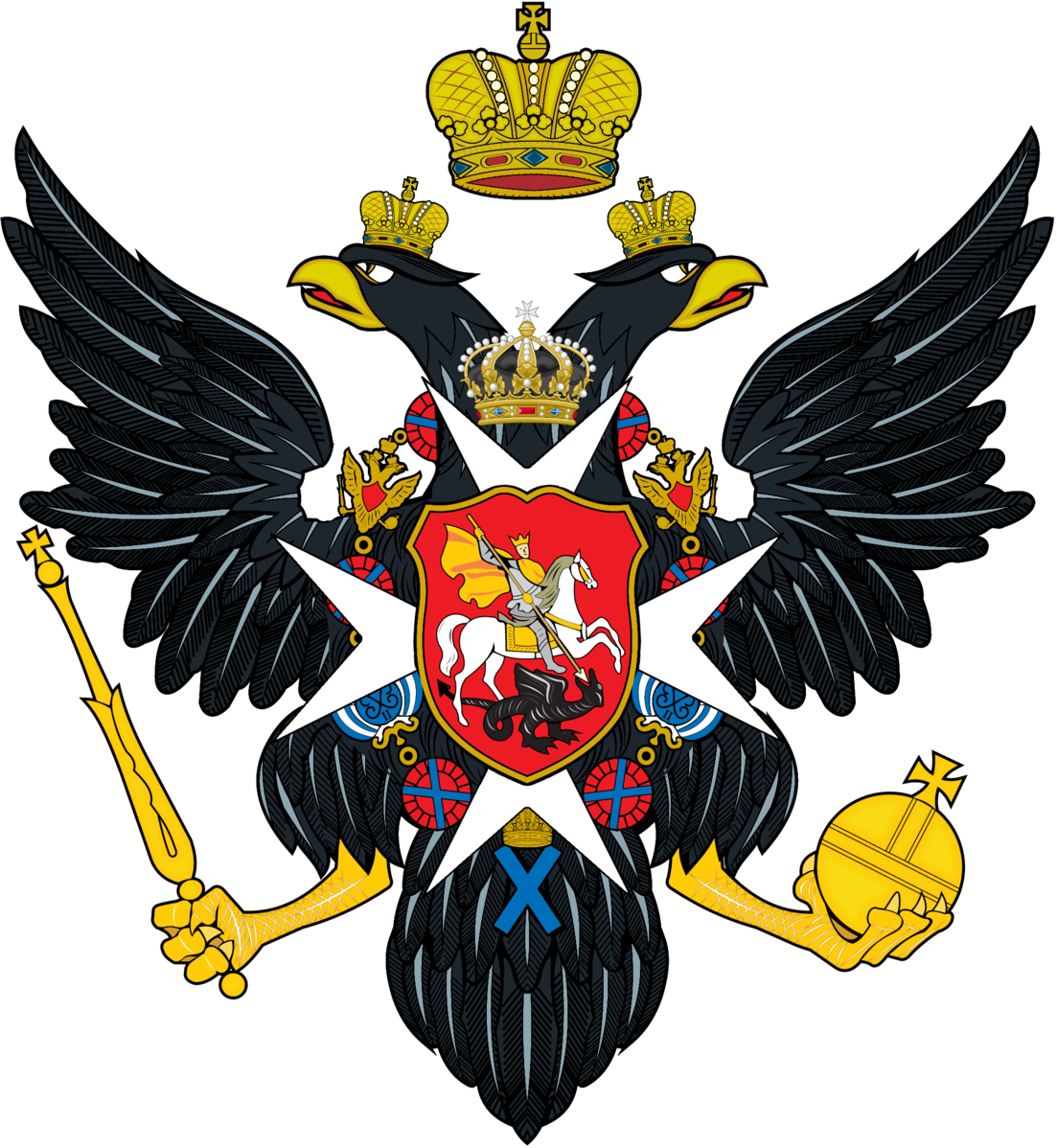
1799–1801: Variant coat of arms under Paul I

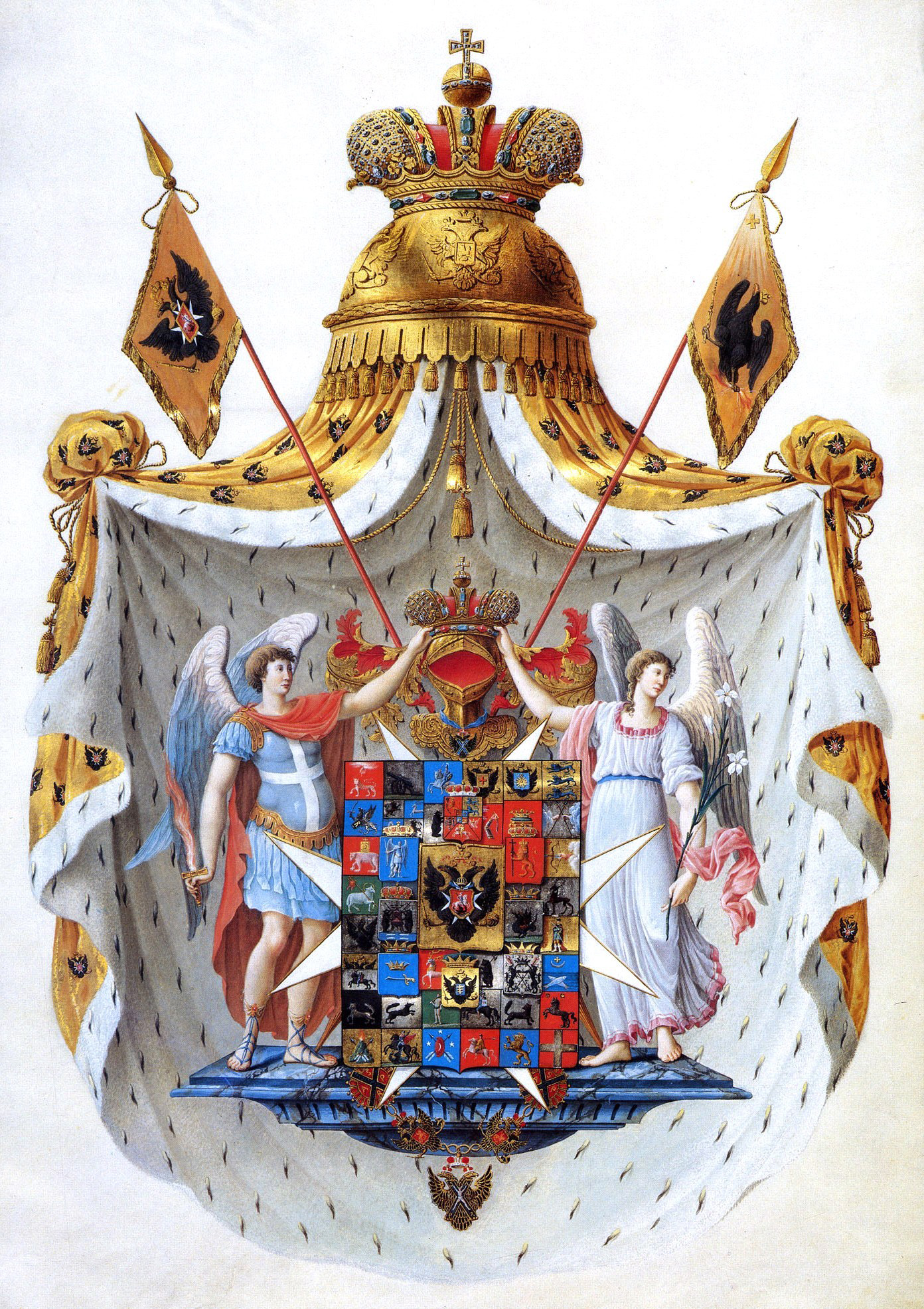
1800: The draft of the greater coat of arms presented to Paul I

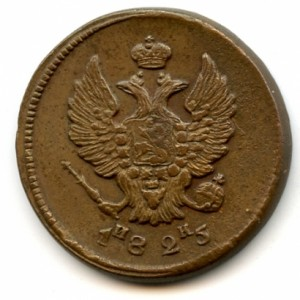
1810–1830: Copper coin of 2 kopecks under Alexander I and Nicholas I

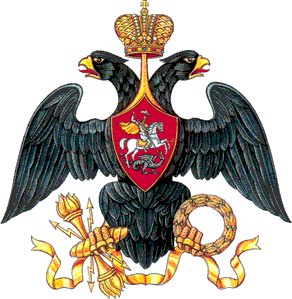
1803–1840: Variant of coat of arms under Alexander I and Nicholas I

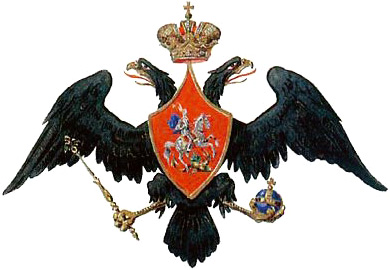
1825–1828: Imperial coat of arms under Nicholas I

1830–1839: Copper coin under Nicholas I

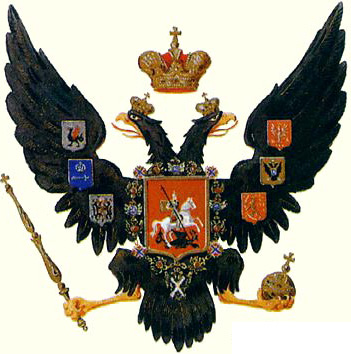
1828–1856: Imperial coat of arms under Nicholas I

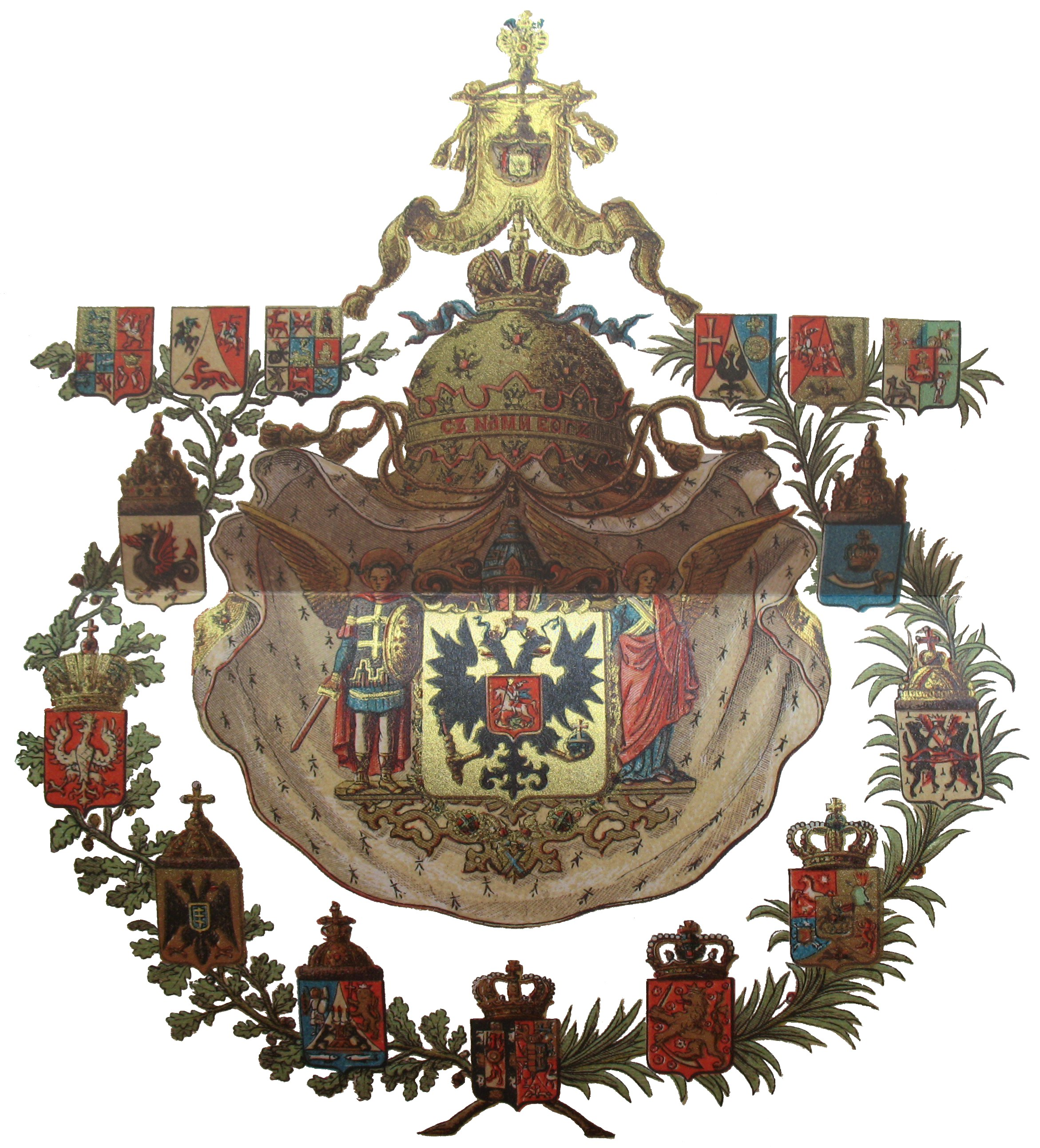
1856–1882: Greater
coat of arms under
Alexander II

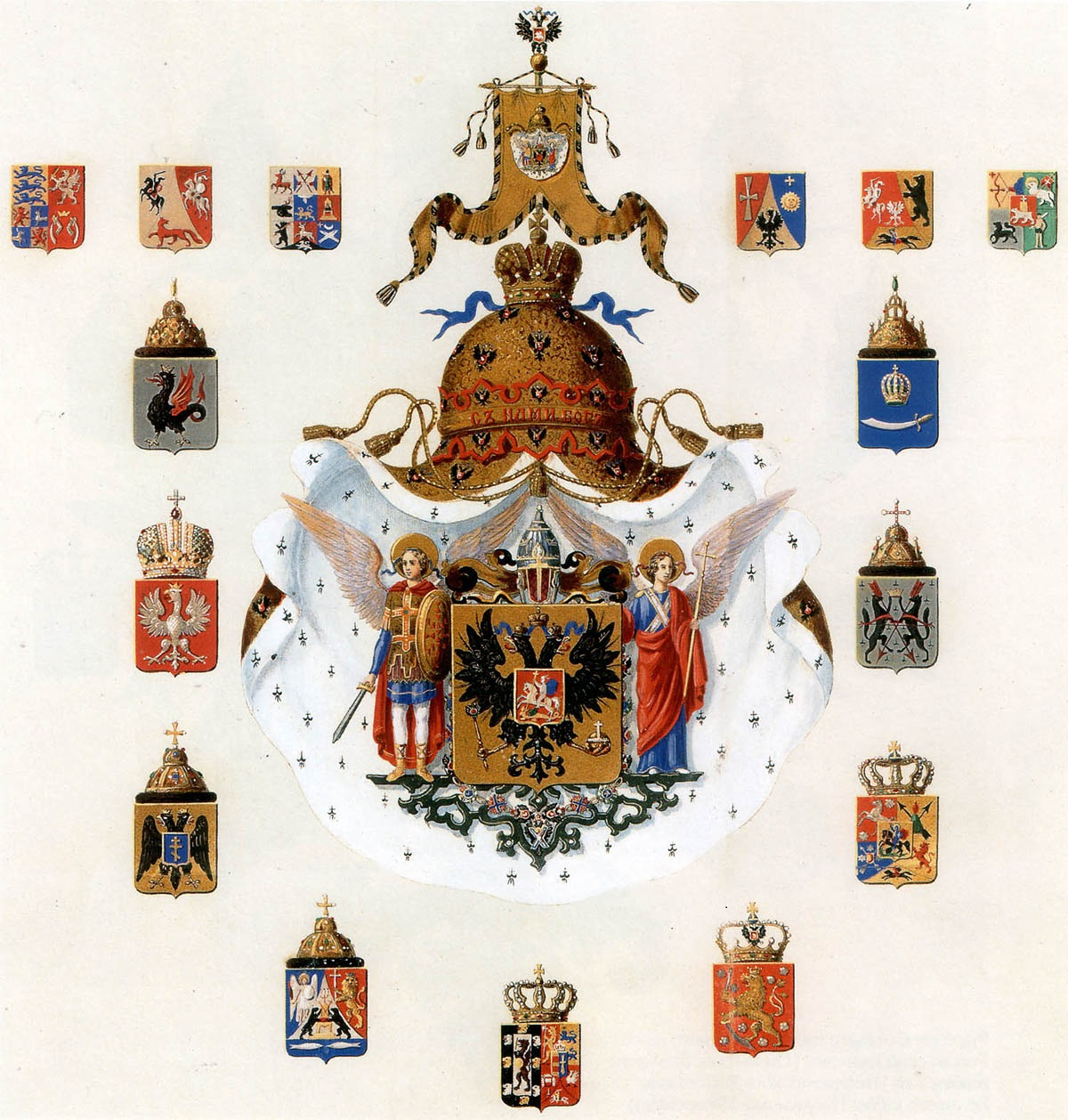
1856–1882: Variant greater
coat of arms under
Alexander II

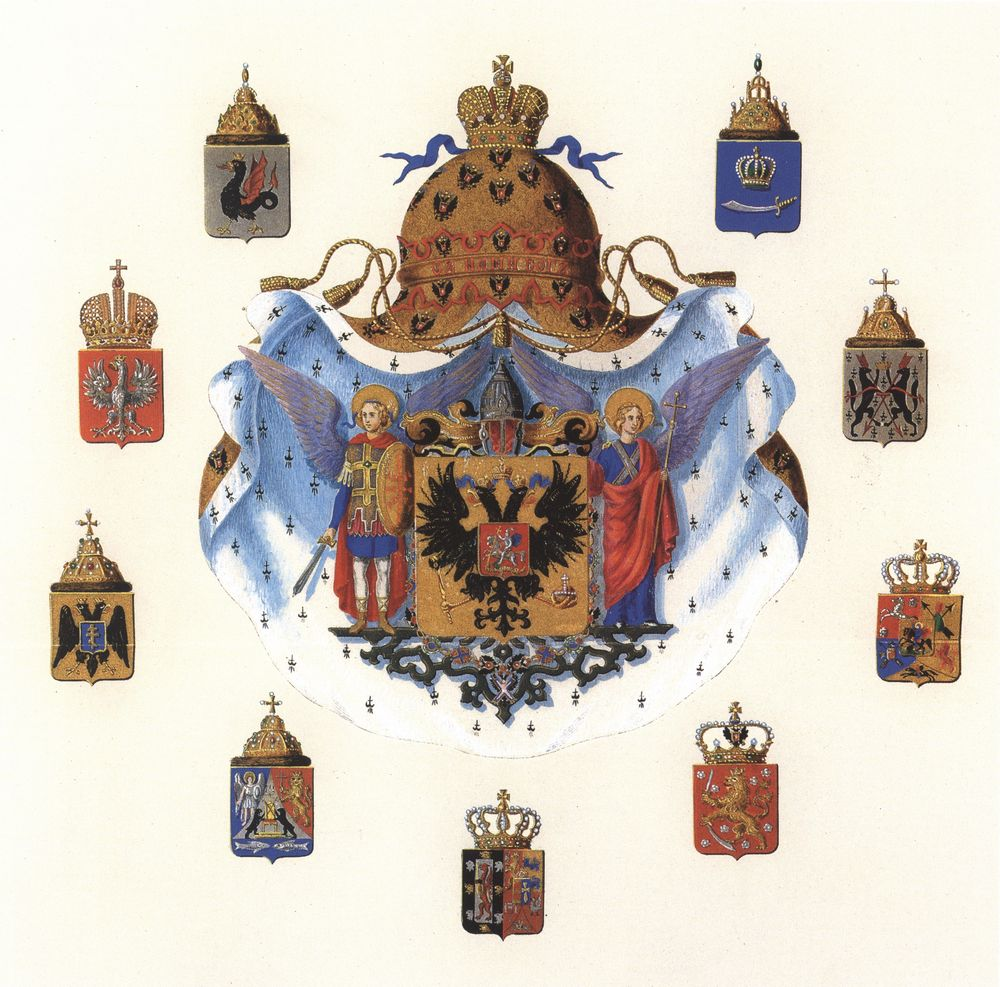
1856–1882: Middle
coat of arms under
Alexander II

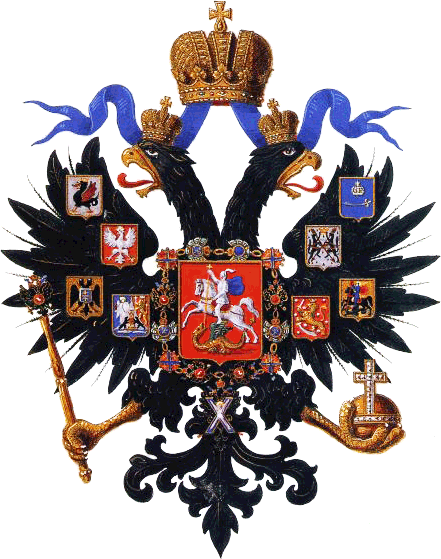
1856–1882: Lesser
coat of arms under
Alexander II

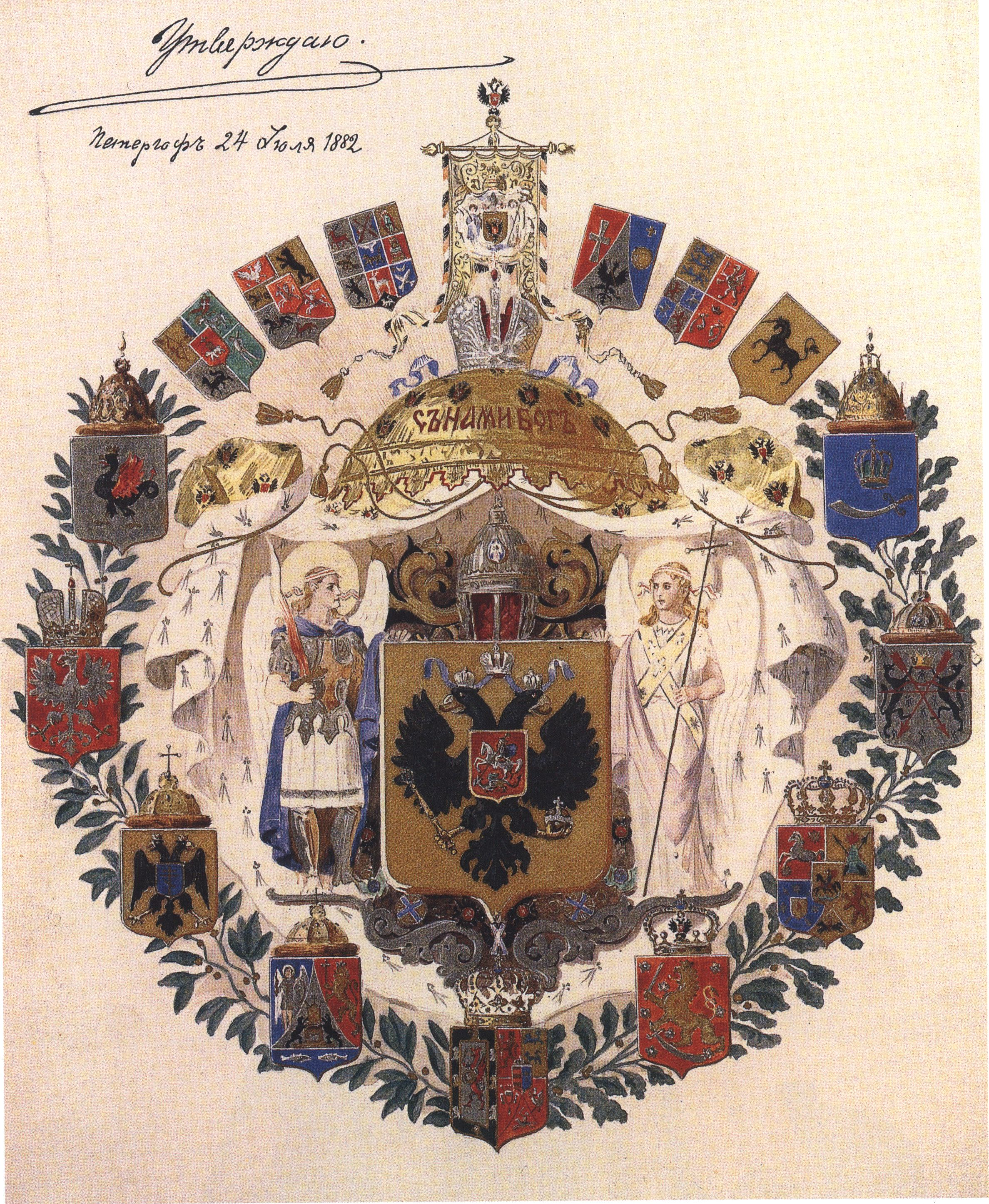
1882–1917: Greater
coat of arms under
Alexander III and Nicholas II

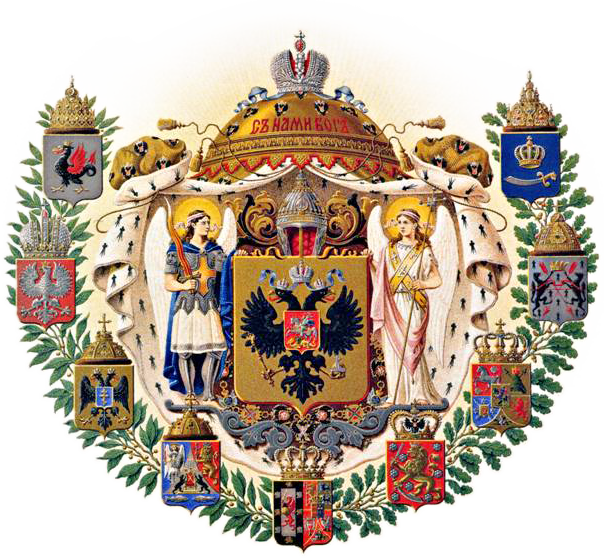
1882–1917: Middle coat of arms under Alexander III and Nicholas II

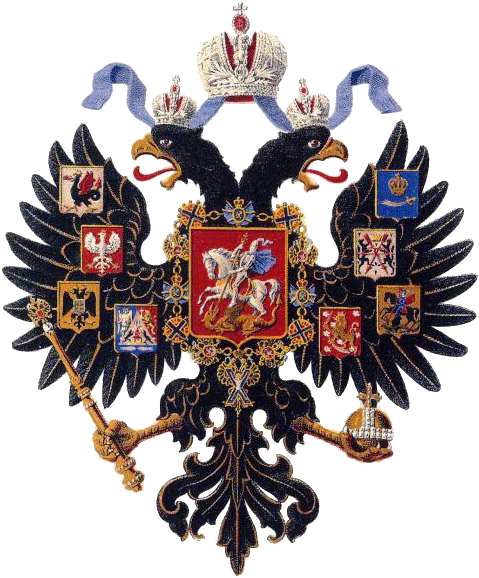
1882–1917: Lesser coat of arms under Alexander III and Nicholas II

1917: Provisional Government/
Republican coat of arms

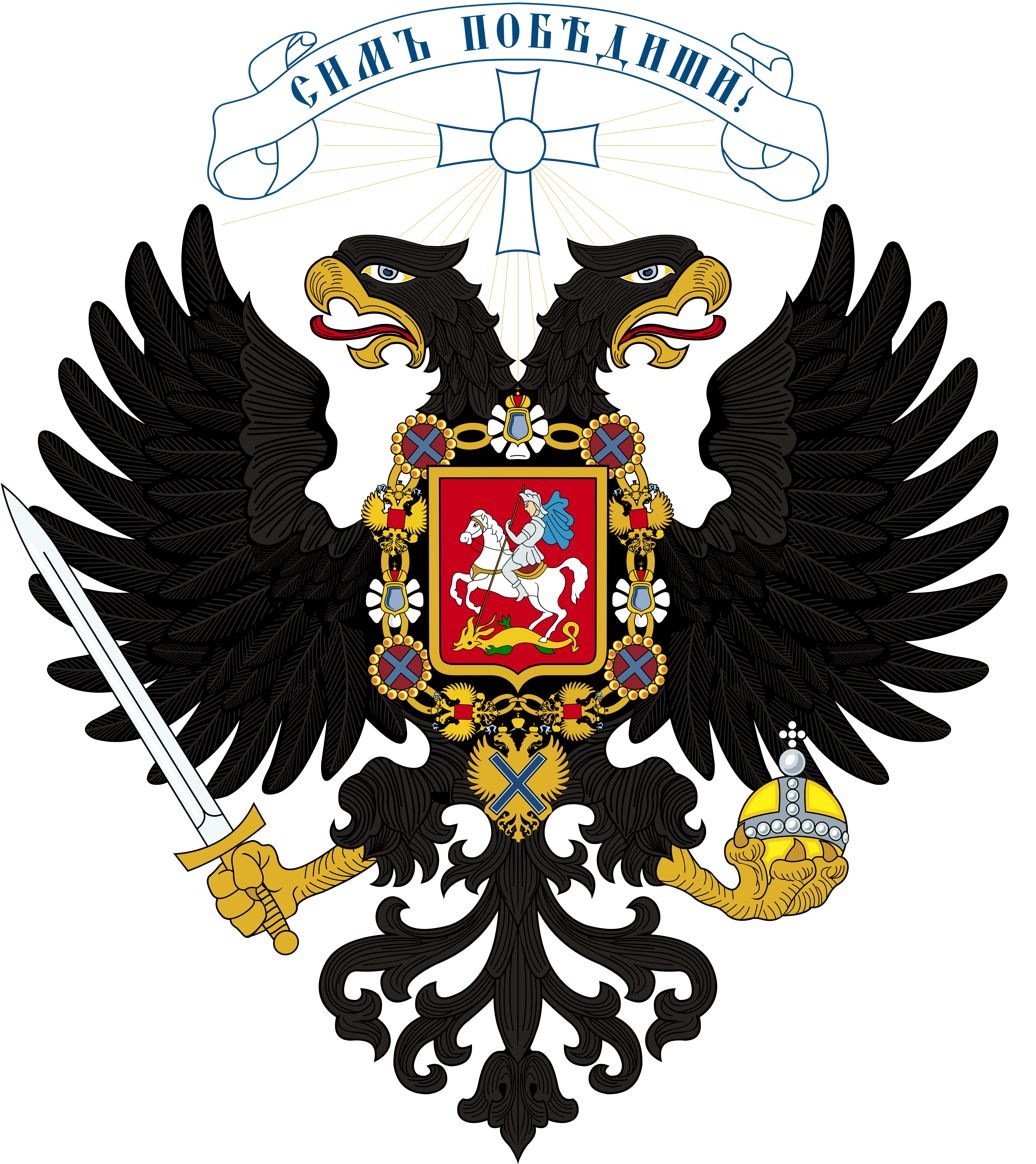
1918–1920: Coat of arms of the Russian State

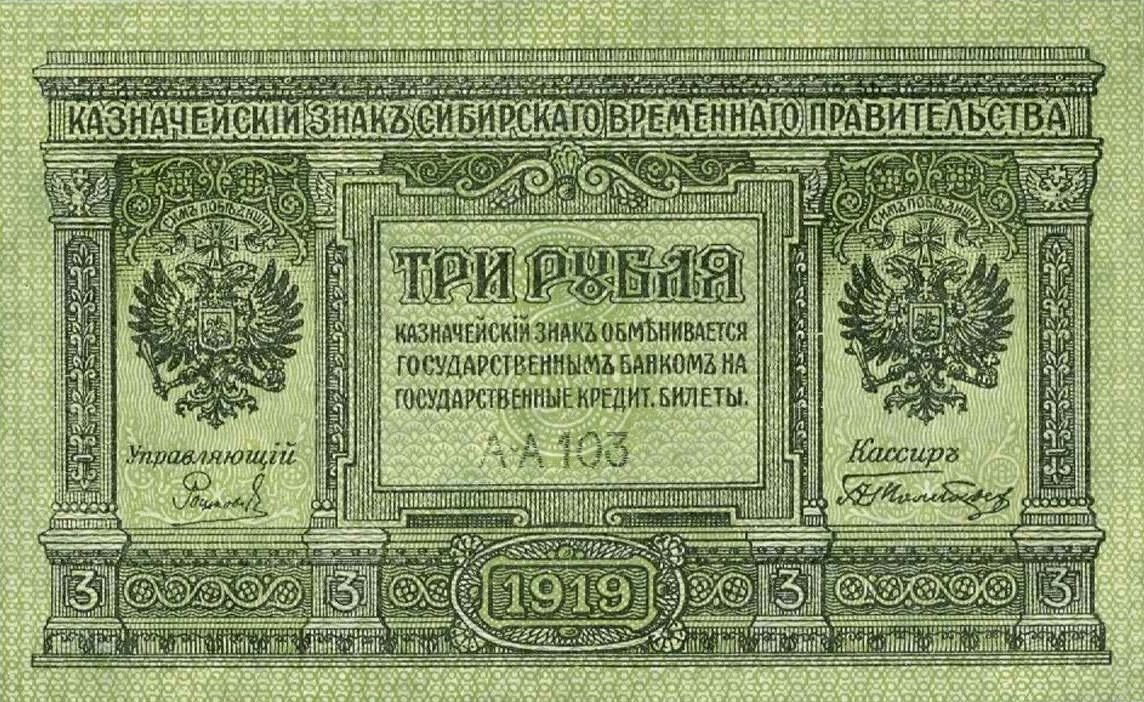
1919: Banknote of 3 Siberian ruble of the Russian State

1918–1920: 1st coat of arms of the Russian SFSR

1920–1954: 2nd coat of arms of the Russian SFSR

1923–1931: 1st coat of arms of the Soviet Union (6 languages)

1931–1936: 2nd coat of arms of the Soviet Union (7 languages)

1936–1946: 3rd coat of arms of the Soviet Union (11 languages)

1946–1955: 4th coat of arms of the Soviet Union (16 languages)

1954–1978: 3rd coat of arms of the Russian SFSR (without dividing points in РСФСР (Russian for 'RSFSR'))

1956–1991: 5th coat of arms of the Soviet Union (15 languages)

1978–1992: 4th coat of arms of the Russian SFSR (added a five-pointed star)

1992–1993: Coat of arms of the Russian Federation after the dissolution of the Soviet Union

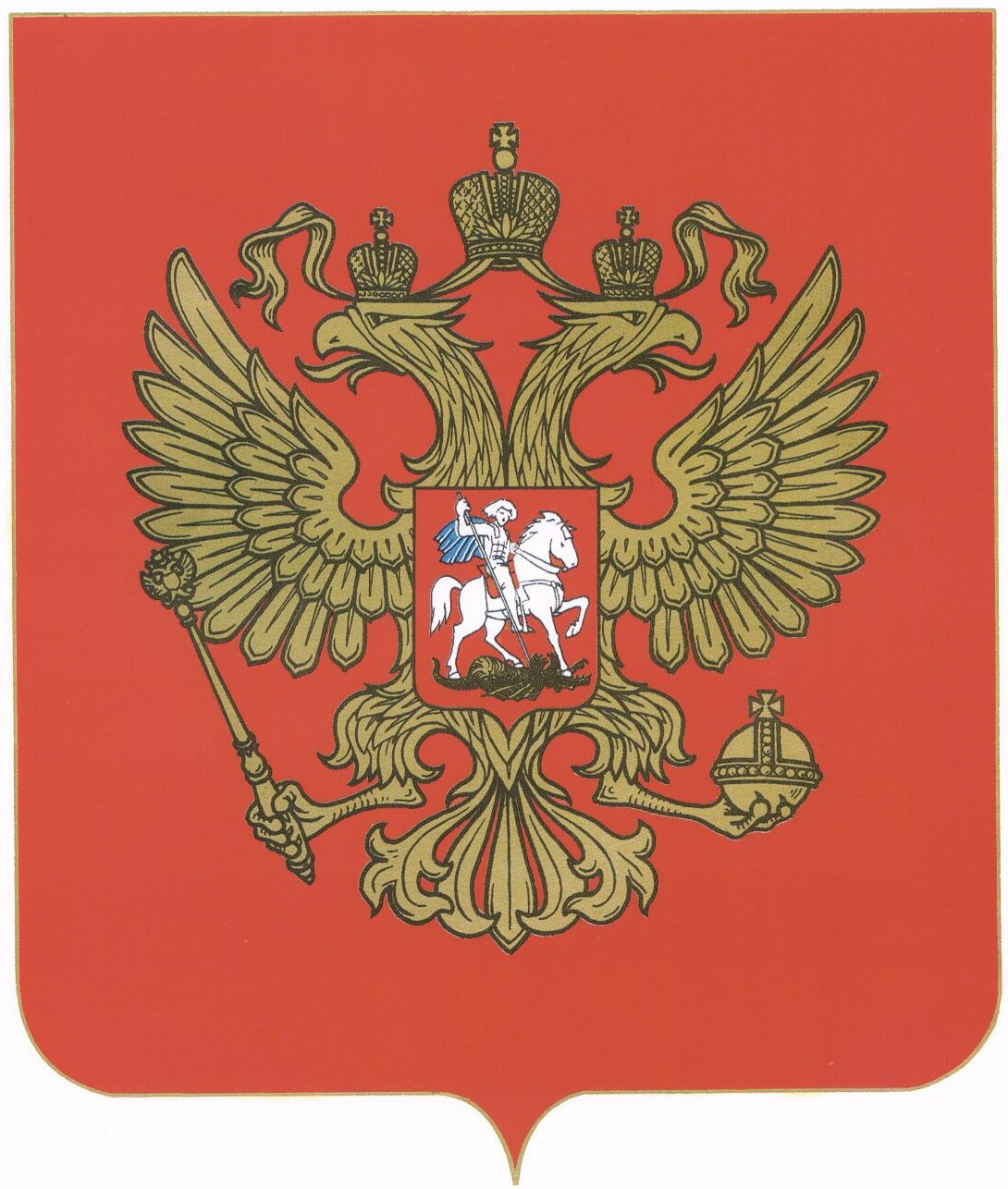
1993: Present
coat of arms (official publication)

1993: Present
coat of arms

1993: Present
coat of arms (other variant)

1993: Present
coat of arms (single-color version)

2017: Present
digital coat of arms (with details)

2017: Present
digital coat of arms

2019: Present digital coat of arms used by the Kremlin office and the President of Russia

== See also ==
- Armorial of Russia
- Coat of arms of Moscow
- Coat of arms of Saint Petersburg
- Russian heraldry
- Flag of Russia
