= Coat of arms of Moscow =

- Armiger: Sergey Sobyanin, Governor of Moscow
- Adopted: 23 November 1993 (current version)

The coat of arms of Moscow depicts a horseman with a spear in his hand slaying a basilisk and is identified with Saint George and the Dragon. The heraldic emblem of Moscow has been an integral part of the coat of arms of Russia since the 16th century.

== Kievan Rus ==
Yaroslav the Wise (died 1054) was the ruler of Kievan Rus with an image of Saint George on his seal. Saint George was his personal patron saint; he was baptised George. Saint George was also the patron saint of Yaroslav's great-grandson, Yury Dolgoruky, who - according to tradition - founded the city of Moscow shortly before his death in 1157. (The name "Георгий" is a Russian-language equivalent of "George".)

A century later, Alexander Nevsky (lived 1221-1263) resumed this usage. Several of his coins depict a horseman slaying a basilisk or a dragon, though the beast is not always visible. Alexander's motivation for reverting to Mstislav's emblem is disputed. It is possible that the image referred to his own victories over the Swedish and German crusaders in the Battle of the Neva (1240) and the Battle of the Ice (1242).

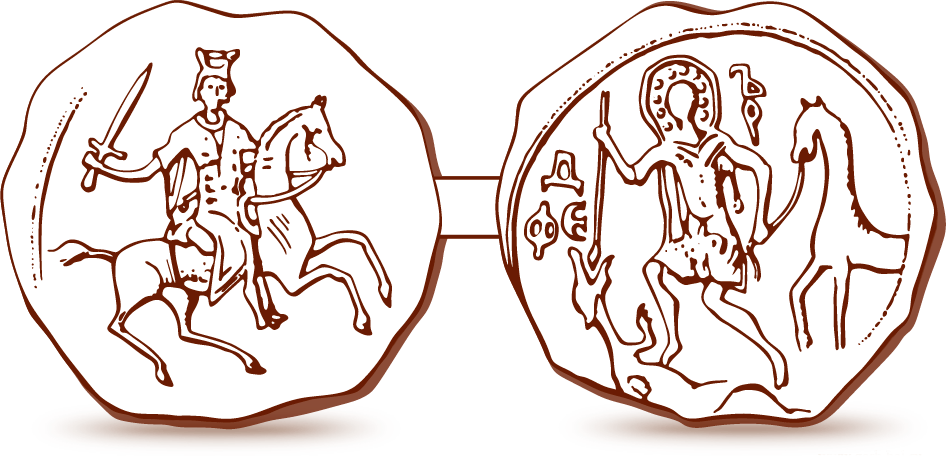
Drawing of the two sides of a seal of Alexander Nevsky, showing left a crowned prince on a horse (maybe Alexander) and right standing Saint Theodore as dragon slayer. It says: Фєдър (an Old-Russian version of Фёдор, Theodore)

== Muscovite Russia ==
Alexander's great-grandson, Ivan II, was the first ruler of Moscow to employ as his emblem the standing warrior with a sword in his hand. Ivan's son Dmitry Donskoy chose to represent this warrior riding a horse with a spear in his hand. Historians traditionally connect Dmitry's symbol with his victory over the Mongols in the Battle of Kulikovo, although historical clues are scarce. At about the same time, a similar symbol, the Vytis, emerged as a state emblem in the rival Grand Duchy of Lithuania.

Drawing of the two sides of a seal of Dmitriy Donskoy, Prince of Moscow (1359-1389) and Grand Prince of Vladimir (1363-1389). Left it says: Печать великого кнѧзѧ Дмитрѣꙗ Іван (Seal of Grand Prince Dmitriy Ivan).

The symbol of the horseman passed down through the generations: from Dmitry to his son Vasily I, then to Vasily II and Ivan III. A coin which featured the image became known as kopeck, from kopyo, the Russian word for "spear".

== Russian Empire ==
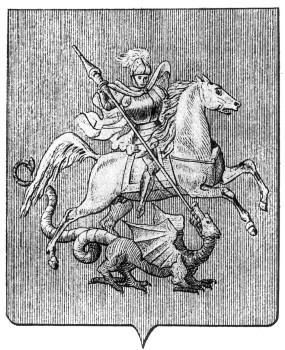
The coat of arms of Moscow city. 1781

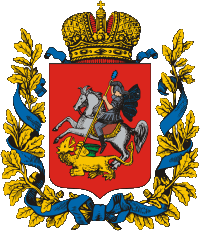
The coat of arms of Moscow Governorate.

At first the charging horseman was interpreted as showing the figure of the ruling tsar slaying an enemy intruding into the Russian lands. This attitude was clearly expressed by the Muscovite statesman Grigory Kotoshikhin, among others. On the title page of the 1663 Bible, the heraldic horseman appears to have the face of Tsar Alexis.

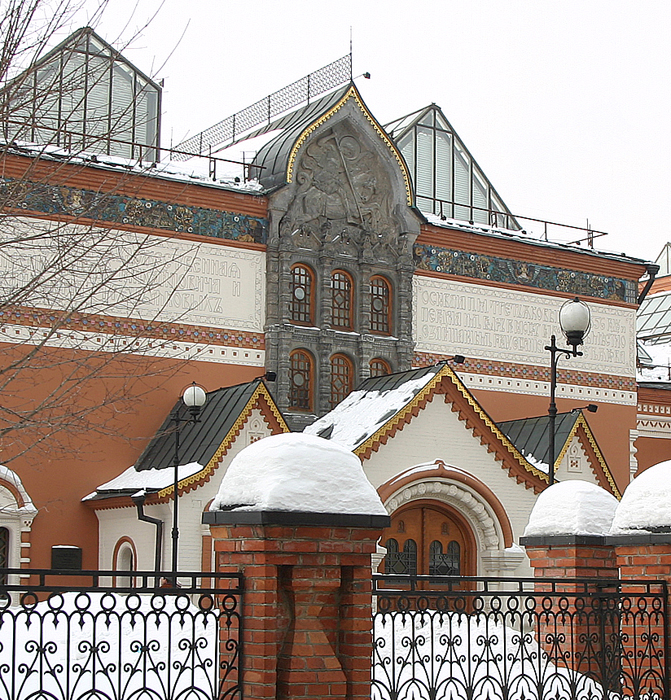
Relief above the entrance to the Tretyakov Gallery.

== 20th century ==
The emblem that was adopted in 1924. It is an example of socialist heraldry.

After the Russian Revolution, the heraldic symbols of the Russian Empire were banned. On 22 September, 1924, the Moscow Governorate Soviet adopted a new emblem which features a red star, the sickle and hammer symbol, and the Monument to the Soviet Constitution. On the red scroll it says: Московский совет рабочих крестьянских и красноармейских депутатов (Moscow council of the deputies of the workers, the peasants, and the Red Army). According to the official description, its imagery reflects the union of the city and the countryside. The new emblem failed to gain popularity and was rarely used. The city of Moscow was separated from the governorate in 1931.

After the dissolution of the Soviet Union, the heraldic representation of Moscow reverted in 1993 to the version used between 1883 and 1918, with some minor modifications.

As the Russian Orthodox Church does not allow sculptural representations of saints, no statues of Saint George and the Dragon were erected in Moscow prior to the Revolution. After the emblem was restored on 23 November, 1993, a cluster of statues on the subject were unveiled in Poklonnaya Gora, Tsvetnoi Boulevard, Manege Square, and other places in Moscow. Most of these were sculpted by Zurab Tsereteli, who also had other versions of the subject installed in such cities as New York City.

== See also ==
- Flag of Moscow, a banner of the city's arms
