= Orders, decorations, and medals of the Soviet Union =

Coat of arms of the Soviet Union (1956–1991)

Awards, decorations, and medals of the Soviet Union are decorations from the former Soviet Union that recognised achievements and personal accomplishments, both military and civilian. Many of the awards, decorations, and orders were discontinued after the dissolution of the Soviet Union, while some are still issued by the Russian Federation, as of 2024. Many of those awards are simply reworked versions of their Soviet predecessors; this includes the reinvention of the Hero of the Soviet Union as the Hero of the Russian Federation, and the Hero of Socialist Labour as the Hero of Labour of the Russian Federation. The wide range of Soviet awards and decorations reflect the diverse and dynamic political, social, and military histories of the USSR, from its progenital revolution in 1917 to its eventual dissolution in 1991.

== Honorary titles ==
Badge and ribbon	Name (English/Russian/Translit)	Creation date	Description	Number awarded
	Marshal's Star; Маршальская Звезда; Maršal'skaja Zvezda	2 September 1940	A neck award given to those who were promoted to Marshal rank in the Soviet Union.	~200 (produced)
	Hero of the Soviet Union; Герой Cоветского Союза; Geroj Sovetskovo Sojuza	16 April 1934	The highest honorary title that could be given to both Soviet civilians and soldiers for a heroic act (may also be awarded with an Order of Lenin).	12,755 (101 twice, 3 thrice, and 2 four-times)
Gold Medal "Hammer and Sickle"	Hero of Socialist Labour; Герой Социалистического Труда; Geroj Socialističeskovo Truda	27 December 1938	Awarded for exceptional achievements in national economy and culture (may also be awarded with an Order of Lenin).	20,812 (201 twice, and 15 thrice)
Order "Mother Heroine"	Mother Heroine; Мать-героиня; Mat'-geroinja	8 July 1944	This title was awarded to all mothers bearing and raising ten or more children. It was awarded upon the first birthday of the last child, provided that nine other children (natural or adopted) remained alive. Children who had perished under heroic, military or other respectful circumstances were also counted.	454,142
	Honoured Test Pilot of the USSR; Заслуженный лётчик-испытатель СССР; Zaslužennyj Lëtčik-Ispytatel' SSSR	14 August 1958	Awarded to military and civilian test-pilots first class of the civilian aircraft industry and of the Ministry of Defense of the USSR, for multiple years of creative work in the field of testing and research of new aviation technologies.	
	Honoured Test Navigator of the USSR; Заслуженный штурман-испытатель СССР; Zaslužennyj šturman-ispytatel' SSSR	14 August 1958	Awarded to military and civilian test-navigators first class of the civilian aircraft industry and of the Ministry of Defense of the USSR, for multiple years of creative work in the field of testing and research of new aviation technologies.	
	Pilot-Cosmonaut of the USSR; Лётчик-космонавт СССР; Lëtčik-kosmonavt SSSR	14 April 1961	Awarded by the Presidium of the Supreme Soviet for the outstanding feat of space flight in the Soviet space program.	72
	Honoured Military Pilot of the USSR; Заслуженный военный лётчик СССР; Zaslužennyj voennyj lëtčik SSSR	26 January 1965	Awarded to members of military flying units, military agencies, military schools, military organizations and other military or federal authorities, having qualified military pilots first class or military pilot-instructors first class, for outstanding achievements in the development of aviation technology, high performance in education and training of flight personnel and long-term trouble-free flight operations in military aviation.	
	Honoured Military Navigator of the USSR; Заслуженный военный штурман СССР; Zaslužennyj voennyj šturman SSSR	26 January 1965	Awarded to members of military flying units, military agencies, military schools, military organizations and other military or federal authorities, having qualified military navigators first class or military navigator-instructors first class, for outstanding achievements in the development of aviation technology, high performance in education and training of flight personnel and long-term trouble-free flight operations in military aviation.	
	Honoured Pilot of the USSR; Заслуженный пилот СССР; Zaslužennyj pilot SSSR	30 September 1965	Awarded to qualified civilian pilots first class for special merit in the development of modern aircraft, in the use of the most advanced piloting techniques, for the highest standards in education and training of flight personnel, for long-term trouble-free flying and for outstanding achievements in the use of aviation in the national economy.	
	Honoured Navigator of the USSR; Заслуженный штурман СССР; Zaslužennyj šturman SSSR	30 September 1965	Awarded to qualified civilian navigators first class for special merit in the development of modern aircraft, in the use of the most advanced navigating techniques, for the highest standards in education and training of flight personnel, for long-term trouble-free flying and for outstanding achievements in the use of aviation in the national economy.	
	Honoured Inventor of the USSR; Заслуженный изобретатель СССР; Zaslužennyj izobretatel' SSSR	28 December 1981	Awarded for innovative proposals.	16
	Honoured Blood Donor of the USSR почетньій донор CCCP Pochetn'íy donor SSSR	24 June 1944	Awarded to blood donors of the Soviet Union.	~175,000
	People's Doctor of the USSR; Народный врач СССР; Narodnyj vrač SSSR	25 October 1977	This decoration was awarded for worthwhile contributions to public health improvement.	
	People's Architect of the USSR; Народный архитектор СССР; Narodnyj architektor SSSR	12 August 1967	This decoration was awarded for significant results either in urban planning or in the design of important buildings.	
	People's Teacher of the USSR; Народный учитель СССР; Narodnyj učitel' SSSR	30 December 1977	This decoration was awarded for worthwhile contributions to the national education system and, mainly, in teaching communism to children and young people.	
	People's Artist of the USSR (Performing arts); Народный артист СССР; Narodnyj artist SSSR	13 January 1937	This decoration was awarded for exceptional achievements in performing arts.	
	People's Painter of the USSR; Народный художник СССР; Narodnyj chudožnik SSSR	16 July 1943	This decoration was awarded for exceptional achievements in visual arts as painting, sculpture, drawing and photography.	

== Orders ==
=== Military orders ===
Badge And Ribbon	Name (English/Russian/Translit)	Creation Date	Description	Number Awarded
Order of Victory	Order of Victory; Орден «Победа» Orden «Pobeda»	8 November 1943	The Order of Victory was the highest military decoration in the Soviet Armed Forces for World War II service, and one of the rarest in the world due to the small number of recipients. It was established on 8 November 1943 and awarded only to Generals and Marshals for "successful operation within the framework of one or several fronts resulting in a radical change of the situation in favour of the Red Army". Made of platinum, rubies and 174 diamonds, the intrinsic value of the order is considerable. The badge depicts the Spasskaya Tower of the Moscow Kremlin, with Lenin's Mausoleum in front.	20
	Order of the Red Banner; Орден Крaсного Знамени; Orden Krasnogo Znameni	16 September 1918 – 1 August 1924	The Order of the Red Banner recognised military deeds. Before the establishment of the Order of Lenin, the Order of the Red Banner functioned as the highest (and practically the only) military order of the USSR. Practically all well-known Soviet commanders became Cavaliers of the Order of the Red Banner. Also awarded to NKVD personnel.	581,300
	Order of the Red Star; Орден Красной Звезды; Orden Krasnoj Zvezdy	6 April 1930	The Order of the Red Star was given to Red Army and Navy personnel for exceptional service in the cause of the defence of the Soviet Union in both war and peace. Also awarded for 15 years of service prior to the creation of the long service awards.	3,876,740
	Order of the Patriotic War first class Орден Отечественной войны первой степени Orden Otechestvennoj vojny pervoj stepeni	20 May 1942	The Order of the Patriotic War was awarded to all soldiers in the Soviet armed forces, security troops, and to partisans for heroic deeds during the Great Patriotic War. In 1985 during the celebration of the 40th anniversary of the Great Patriotic War, it was decided that all surviving veterans of the war would be awarded either second or first class of the Order.	2,627,899
	Order of the Patriotic War; 2nd class Орден Отечественной Войны второй степени Orden Otechestvennoj vojny vtoroj stepeni	20 May 1942	The Order of the Patriotic War was awarded to all soldiers in the Soviet armed forces, security troops, and to partisans for heroic deeds during the Great Patriotic War. In 1985 during the celebration of the 40th anniversary of the Great Patriotic War, it was decided that all surviving veterans of the war would be awarded either 2nd or first class of the Order.	6,716,384
	Order of Alexander Nevsky; Орден Александра Невского; Orden Aleksandra Nevskogo	29 July 1942	To officers of the army for personal courage and resolute leadership.	50,585
	Order of Suvorov first class Орден Суворова первой степени Orden Suvorova pervoj stepeni	29 July 1942	The first class order is awarded to army commanders for exceptional direction of combat operations.	393
	Order of Suvorov; 2nd class Орден Суворова второй степени Orden Suvorova vtoroj stepeni	29 July 1942	The 2nd class order is awarded to corps, divisions and brigade commanders for a decisive victory over a numerically superior enemy.	2,862
	Order of Suvorov; 3rd class Орден Суворова третьей степени Orden Suvorova tret'ej stepeni	29 July 1942	The 3rd class order is awarded to regimental commanders, their chiefs of staff, and battalion and company commanders for outstanding leadership leading to a battle victory.	4,012
	Order Of Kutuzov first class Орден Кутузова первой степени Orden Kutuzova pervoj stepeni	29 July 1942	The Order Of Kutuzov (first class) was created to award commanders of fronts and armies for skilful evasions of enemy attacks and successful counter-attacks.	669
	Order Of Kutuzov; 2nd class Орден Кутузова второй степени Orden Kutuzova vtoroj stepeni	29 July 1942	The Order Of Kutuzov (2nd class) was created to award commanders of corps, divisions and brigades for skilful evasions of enemy attacks and successful counter-attacks.	3,325
	Order Of Kutuzov; 3rd class Орден Кутузова третьей степени Orden Kutuzova tеret'ej stepeni	8 February 1943	The Order Of Kutuzov (3rd class) was created to award commanders, their chiefs of staff, battalion and company commanders for skilful evasions of enemy attacks and successful counter-attacks.	3,328
	Order of Bogdan Khmelnitsky first class Орден Богдана Хмельницкого первой степени Orden Bogdana Hmel'nitskogo pervoj stepeni	10 October 1943	The first class order was awarded to front or army commanders for successful direction of combat operations that led to the liberation of a region or town inflicting heavy casualties on the enemy.	323
	Order of Bogdan Khmelnitsky; 2nd class Орден Богдана Хмельницкого второй степени Orden Bogdana Hmel'nitskogo vtoroj stepeni	10 October 1943	The 2nd class order was awarded to corps, divisions, brigade or battalion commanders for a breach of defensive enemy line or a raid in the enemy rear.	2,389
	Order Of Bogdan Khmelnitsky; 3rd class Орден Богдана Хмельницкого третьей степени Orden Bogdana Hmel'nitskogo tret'ej stepeni	10 October 1943	The 3rd class medal was awarded to officers, partisan commanders, sergeants, corporals and privates of the Red Army and partisan units for outstanding bravery and resourcefulness leading to a battle victory.	5,738
	Order of Glory first class Орден Славы первой степени Orden Slavy pervoj stepeni	8 November 1943	The Order of Glory, modelled closely upon the Tsarist Cross of St. George, was awarded to non-commissioned officers and soldiers of the armed forces, as well as junior lieutenants of the air force, for bravery in the face of the enemy. A person initially received the third degree, and would subsequently be promoted to higher degrees for further acts of bravery.	2,620
	Order of Glory; 2nd class Орден Славы второй степени Orden Slavy vtoroj stepeni	8 November 1943	The Order of Glory, modelled closely upon the Tsarist Cross of St. George, was awarded to non-commissioned officers and soldiers of the armed forces, as well as junior lieutenants of the air force, for bravery in the face of the enemy. A person initially received the third degree, and would subsequently be promoted to higher degrees for further acts of bravery.	46,473
	Order of Glory; 3rd class Орден Славы третьей степени Orden Slavy tret'ej stepeni	8 November 1943	The Order of Glory, modelled closely upon the Tsarist Cross of St. George, was awarded to non-commissioned officers and soldiers of the armed forces, as well as junior lieutenants of the air force, for bravery in the face of the enemy. A person initially received the third degree, and would subsequently be promoted to higher degrees for further acts of bravery.	997,815
	Order of Ushakov first class Орден Ушакова первой степени Orden Ushakova pervoj stepeni	3 March 1944	Awarded to naval officers for outstanding achievements in planning and conducting naval operations and for victories in combat resulting from such operations.	47
	Order of Ushakov; 2nd class Орден Ушакова второй степени Orden Ushakova vtoroj stepeni	3 March 1944	Awarded to naval officers for excellent direction and successful planning of a sea battle against a numerically superior enemy that results in the annihilation of many forces.	198
	Order of Nakhimov first class Орден Нахимова первой степени Orden Nakhimova pervoj stepeni	3 March 1944	Awarded to naval officers for outstanding planning and execution of operations.	80
	Order of Nakhimov; 2nd class Орден Нахимова второй степени Orden Nakhimova vtoroj stepeni	3 March 1944	Awarded to naval officers for outstanding planning and execution of operations.	467
	Order "For Service to the Homeland in the Armed Forces of the USSR" first class Орден «За службу Родине в Вооружённых Силах СССР» первой степени Orden «Za službu Rodine v Vooruzhennykh Silakh SSSR» pervoj stepeni	28 October 1974	This order was awarded for exemplary service in the armed forces, both during a war and during peacetime. A recipient was first awarded a 3rd class order, then if further deeds were made, the second and the first class. Like the civilian Order of Labour Glory upon which it is modeled, it gave a certain number of material benefits to their owners.	13
	Order "For Service to the Homeland in the Armed Forces of the USSR"; 2nd class Орден «За службу Родине в Вооружённых Силах СССР» второй степени Orden «Za službu Rodine v Vooruzhennykh Silakh SSSR» vtoroj stepeni	28 October 1974	This order was awarded for exemplary service in the armed forces, both during a war and during peacetime. A recipient was first awarded a 3rd class order, then if further deeds were made, the second and the first class. Like the civilian Order Of Labour Glory upon which it is modeled, it gave a certain number of material benefits to their owners.	589
	Order "For Service To The Homeland In The Armed Forces of the USSR"; 3rd class Орден «За службу Родине в Вооружённых Силах СССР» третьей степени Orden «Za službu Rodine v Vooruzhennykh Silakh SSSR» tret'ej stepeni	28 October 1974	This order was awarded for exemplary service in the armed forces, both during a war and during peacetime. A recipient was first awarded a 3rd class order, then if further deeds were made, the second and the first class. Like the civilian Order Of Labour Glory upon which it is modeled, it gave a certain number of material benefits to their owners.	69,576

=== Military and civil orders ===
Badge And Ribbon	Name (English/Russian/Translit)	Creation Date	Description	Number Awarded
	Order of Lenin Орден Ленина Orden Lenina	6 April 1930	The Order of Lenin was the highest civil decoration. Given to both civilians and soldiers for outstanding service to the motherland in defence, strengthening peace and strengthening labour. From 1930–1934 made of silver, 1934–1936 made of gold and from 1936–1991 made of platinum.	462,184
	Order of the October Revolution Орден «Октябрьской Революции» Orden Oktjabr'skoj Revolyutsii	31 October 1967	Created for the 50th anniversary of the October Revolution, this order was awarded to individuals or groups for services furthering communism or the state or in enhancing the defences of the Soviet Union.	106,462
	Order of Friendship of Peoples Орден Дружбы народов Orden Druzhby narodov	17 October 1972	This order was awarded to persons, organisations, enterprises, military units, as well as administrative subdivisions of the USSR for "accomplishments in strengthening of inter-race and international friendship and cooperation, for economical, political, scientific, military and cultural development of the Soviet Union".	77,719

=== Civil orders ===
Badge And Ribbon	Name (English/Russian/Translit)	Creation Date	Description	Number Awarded
	Order of the Red Banner of Labour Орден Трудового Красного Знамени Orden Trudovogo Krasnogo Znameni	7 September 1928	This order was established as the civilian counterpart of the military Order of the Red Banner and was awarded for exceptional working achievements.	1,259,943
	Order of the Badge of Honour Орден «Знак Почета» Orden «Znak Pocheta»	25 November 1935	This order conferred on citizens of the USSR for "outstanding achievements in production, scientific research and social, cultural and other forms of social activity". It was replaced on 28 December 1988 by the Order of Honour, with an almost identical appearance.	1,574,368
	Order of Maternal Glory first class Орден «Материнская слава» I степени Orden «Materinskaja slava» I stepeni	8 July 1944	This decoration was awarded to all mothers bearing and raising 9 children. It was awarded upon the first birthday of the last child, provided that eight other children (natural or adopted) remained alive. Children who had perished under heroic, military or other respectful circumstances were also counted.	881,070
	Order of Maternal Glory; 2nd class Орден «Материнская слава» II степени Orden «Materinskaja slava» II stepeni	8 July 1944	This decoration was awarded to all mothers bearing and raising 8 children. It was awarded upon the first birthday of the last child, provided that seven other children (natural or adopted) remained alive. Children who had perished under heroic, military or other respectful circumstances were also counted.	1,697,223
	Order of Maternal Glory; 3rd class Орден «Материнская слава» III степени Orden «Materinskaja slava» III stepeni	8 July 1944	This decoration was awarded to all mothers bearing and raising 7 children. It was awarded upon the first birthday of the last child, provided that six other children (natural or adopted) remained alive. Children who had perished under heroic, military or other respectful circumstances were also counted.	3,083,328
	Order of Labour Glory first class Орден Трудовой Славы первой степени Orden Trudovoj Slavy pervoj stepeni	18 January 1974	Closely modelled on the Order of Glory, this order was meant to be its civilian counterpart, awarded for exceptional labour achievements. In the same way as the Order of Glory, it was divided in three classes (the highest being the first class), with a person initially received the third degree, and subsequently promoted to higher degrees for further achievements. It also gave a certain number of material benefits to their owners, such as an increased pension raises and free public transport.	972
	Order of Labour Glory; 2nd class Орден Трудовой Славы второй степени Orden Trudovoj Slavy vtoroj stepeni	18 January 1974	Closely modelled on the Order of Glory, this order was meant to be its civilian counterpart, awarded for exceptional labour achievements. In the same way as the Order of Glory, it was divided in three classes (the highest being the first class), with a person initially received the third degree, and subsequently promoted to higher degrees for further achievements. It also gave a certain number of material benefits to their owners, such as an increased pension raises and free public transport.	45,198
	Order of Labour Glory; 3rd class Орден Трудовой Славы третьей степени Orden Trudovoj Slavy tret'ej stepeni	18 January 1974	Closely modelled on the Order of Glory, this order was meant to be its civilian counterpart, awarded for exceptional labour achievements. In the same way as the Order of Glory, it was divided in three classes (the highest being the first class), with a person initially received the third degree, and subsequently promoted to higher degrees for further achievements. It also gave a certain number of material benefits to their owners, such as an increased pension raises and free public transport.	637,817
	Order "For Personal Courage" Орден «За личное мужество» Orden «Za lichnoe muzhestvo»	28 December 1988	This decoration could be awarded to any USSR citizen showing outstanding courage and bravery during life-saving, keeping of public order and safeguard of State property, as well as for fighting crime, environmental catastrophes and other exceptional events.	529

== Military medals ==
=== General ===
Badge And Ribbon	Name (English/Russian/Translit)	Creation Date	Description	Number Awarded
	Medal "For Courage" Медаль «За отвагу» Medal «Za otvagu»	17 October 1938	The Medal for Courage was awarded for personal courage and valour displayed in defending the socialist motherland during the performance of military duties, for "acts of bravery during a battle, during the defence of the state borders or during military duties associated with risk to life".	4,569,893
	Medal "For Battle Merit" Медаль «За боевые заслуги» Medal «Za boevye zaslugi»	17 October 1938	This military medal awarded for "combat action resulting in a military success", "courageous defence of the state borders", or "successful military and political training and preparation". Also awarded for 10 years of service prior to the creation of the long service awards.	5,210,078
	Medal "Partisan of the Patriotic War" first class Медаль «Партизану Отечественной войны» I степени Medal «Partizanu Otechestvennoj vojny» I stepeni	2 February 1943	Awarded to partisans and partisan movement organisers for courage and valour against occupying troops during the Great Patriotic War.	56,883
	Medal "Partisan of the Patriotic War"; 2nd class Медаль «Партизану Отечественной войны» II степени Medal «Partizanu Otechestvennoj vojny» II stepeni	2 February 1943	Awarded to partisans and partisan movement organisers for courage and valour against occupying troops during the Great Patriotic War.	70,992
	Ushakov Medal Медаль Ушакова Medal Ushakova	3 March 1944	This medal was awarded to fleet officers and soldiers, both during war and peacetime, for courage and bravery during military operations, state borders patrol, and military duties with life risk. Note that the "peacetime" part results from a modification of the status in 1980 (before that, the medal used to be awarded only during wars).	15,641
	Nakhimov Medal Медаль Нахимова Medal Nakhimova	3 March 1944	Awarded to those in Naval Service for valour and gallantry during sea battles and to for those not in naval service who with efficient and resourceful actions at the risk of their lives, contributed to the successful outcome of combat missions involving Soviet Naval Forces.	14,020
	Medal "For Distinction in Guarding the State Border of the USSR" Медаль «За отличие в охране государственной границы СССР» Medal «Za otlichie v okhrane gosudarstvennoj granitsy SSSR»	13 July 1950	Awarded to K.G.B. Border Troops personnel for military or other actions displaying excellence in guarding the Soviet borders.	c. 67,520
	Medal "For Distinction in the Protection of Public Order" Медаль «За отличную службу по охране общественного порядка» Medal «Za otlichnuyu sluzhbu po ohrane obschestvennogo porjadka»	1 November 1950	Awarded to members of the Ministry of Internal Affairs (MVD) and its Internal Troops for aiding in preserving public order and to all service personnel of the militsiya for courage shown during the liquidation of criminal groups and arrest of criminal or for excellence in organising and coordinating militia in combating crime or for selfless acts during the prevention of hooliganism/alcoholism/theft.	c. 47,000
	Medal "For Distinction in Military Service" first class Медаль «За отличие в воинской службе» I степени Medal «Za otlichie v voinskoj sluzhbe» I stepeni	28 October 1974	Awarded to soldiers of the Soviet Army, Navy, border and internal troops: for excellent performance in combat and political training; for special distinction in exercises and manoeuvres in combat service and combat duty; for bravery, selflessness, and other services, shown during military service.	c. 20,000
	Medal "For Distinction in Military Service"; 2nd class Медаль «За Отличие В Воинской Службе» II степени Medal «Za otlichie v voinskoj sluzhbe» II stepeni	28 October 1974	Awarded to soldiers of the Soviet Army, Navy, border and internal troops: for excellent performance in combat and political training; for special distinction in exercises and manoeuvres in combat service and combat duty; for bravery, selflessness, and other services, shown during military service.	c. 120,000
	Medal "For Strengthening of Brotherhood in Arms" Медаль «За укрепление боевого содружества» Medal «Za ukreplenie boevogo sodruzhestva»	25 May 1979	Awarded to military personnel, to employees of state security, of internal affairs, and to other citizens of the states participants of the Warsaw Pact, as well as other socialist and other friendly nations for merit in strengthening military "Brotherhood in Arms".	c. 20,000
	Medal "For Impeccable Service"; First class Медаль «За безупречную службу» первой степени Medal «Za bezuprechnuju sluzhbu» pervoj stepeni	25 January 1958	Awarded for 20 years of excellent service. Several different variants were awarded to different groups, such as the K.G.B, M.V.D, M.I.A, Soviet Army, and so on.	
	Medal "For Impeccable Service"; Second class Медаль «За безупречную службу» второй степени Medal «Za bezuprechnuju sluzhbu» vtoroj stepeni	25 January 1958	Awarded for 15 years of excellent service. Several different variants were awarded to different groups, such as the K.G.B, M.V.D, M.I.A, Soviet Army, and so on.	
	Medal "For Impeccable Service"; Third Class Медаль «За безупречную службу» третьей степени Medal «Za bezuprechnuju sluzhbu» tret'ej stepeni	25 January 1958	Awarded for 10 years of excellent service. Several different variants were awarded to different groups, such as the K.G.B, M.V.D, M.I.A, Soviet Army, and so on.	
	Medal "Veteran of the Armed Forces of the USSR" Медаль «Ветеран Вооружённых Сил СССР» Medal «Veteran Vooruzhennyh Sil SSSR»	20 May 1976	For 25 years of impeccable military service.	c. 880,000

=== Campaign medals ===
==== Second World War defensive campaign medals ====
Badge And Ribbon	Name (English/Russian/Translit)	Creation Date	Description	Number Awarded
	Medal "For the Defence of Leningrad" Медаль «За оборону Ленинграда» Medal «Za oboronu Leningrada»	22 December 1942	Awarded to all Soviet military and civilians who participated in the defence of Leningrad between 8 September 1941 and 27 January 1944.	c. 1,496,000
	Medal "For the Defence of Odessa" Медаль «За оборону Одессы» Medal «Za oboronu Odessy»	22 December 1942	Awarded to all Soviet military and civilians who participated in the defence of Odessa between 10 August and 16 October 1941.	c. 38,000
	Medal "For the Defence of Sevastopol" Медаль «За оборону Севастополя» Medal «Za oboronu Sevastopolja»	22 December 1942	Awarded to all Soviet military and civilians who participated in the defence of Sevastopol between 5 November 1941 and 4 July 1942.	52,540
	Medal "For the Defence of Stalingrad" Медаль «За оборону Сталинграда» Medal «Za oboronu Stalingrada»	22 December 1942	Awarded to all Soviet military and civilians who participated in the defence of Stalingrad between 12 July and 19 November 1942.	759,560
	Medal "For the Defence of Moscow" Медаль «За оборону Москвы» Medal «Za oboronu Moskvy»	1 May 1944	Awarded to all Soviet military and civilians who participated in the defence of Moscow between 19 October 1941 and 25 January 1942.	1,028,600
	Medal "For the Defence of the Caucasus" Медаль «За оборону Кавказа» Medal «Za oboronu Kavkaza»	1 May 1944	Awarded to all Soviet military and civilians who participated in the defence of the Caucasus region between July 1942 and 9 October 1943.	c. 870,000
	Medal "For the Defence of the Soviet Transarctic" Медаль «За оборону Советского Заполярья» Medal «Za oboronu Sovestkogo Zapoliarja»	5 December 1944	Awarded to all Soviet military and civilians who participated in the defence of the Soviet Trans-Arctic regions between 25 June 1941 and 19 September 1944.	353,240
	Medal "For the Defence of Kiev" Медаль «За оборону Киева» Medal «Za oboronu Kieva»	21 June 1961	Awarded to all Soviet military and civilians who participated in the defence of Kiev between 7 July and 26 September 1941.	107,540

==== Second World War offensive campaign medals ====
Badge And Ribbon	Name (English/Russian/Translit)	Creation Date	Description	Number Awarded
	Medal "For the Capture of Berlin" Медаль «За взятие Берлина» Medal «Za vzjatie Berlina»	9 June 1945	Awarded to Soviet service personnel who took part in the capture of Berlin from 22 April and 2 May 1945.	c. 1,100,000
	Medal "For the Capture of Budapest" Медаль «За взятие Будапешта» Medal «Za vzjatie Budapeshta»	9 June 1945	Awarded to Soviet service personnel who took part in the capture of Budapest between 20 December 1944 and 15 February 1945.	362,050
	Medal "For the Capture of Königsberg" Медаль «За взятие Кенигсберга» Medal «Za vzjatie Kenigsberga»	9 June 1945	Awarded to Soviet service personnel who took part in the capture of Königsberg between 23 January and 10 April 1945.	c. 760,000
	Medal "For the Capture of Vienna" Медаль «За взятие Вены» Medal «Za vzjatie Veny»	9 June 1945	Awarded to Soviet service personnel who took part in the capture of Vienna between 16 March and 13 April 1945.	277,380
	Medal "For the Liberation of Prague" Медаль «За освобождение Праги» Medal «Za osvobozhdenie Pragi»	9 June 1945	Awarded to Soviet service personnel who took part in the liberation of Prague between the 3 and 9 May 1945.	400,070
	Medal "For the Liberation of Warsaw" Медаль «За освобождение Варшавы» Medal «Za osvobozhdenie Warshavy»	9 June 1945	Awarded to Soviet service personnel who took part in the liberation of Warsaw between the 14 and 17 January 1945.	701,700
	Medal "For the Liberation of Belgrade" Медаль «За освобождение Белграда» Medal «Za osvobozhdenie Belgrada»	9 June 1945	Awarded to Soviet service personnel who took part in the liberation of Belgrade between 29 September and 22 October 1944.	c. 70,000
	Medal "For the Victory over Germany in the Great Patriotic War 1941–1945" Медаль «За Победу над Германией в Великой Отечественной войне 1941–1945 гг.» Medal «Za Pobedu nad Germaniej v Velikoj Otechestvennoj vojne 1941–1945 gg.»	9 May 1945	Awarded to Soviet service personnel who were on active service during the Great Patriotic War (Military service of 3 months or civil service of 6 months). Also awarded to some allied forces such as the post 9 September 1944 Bulgarian Armed Forces.	14,933,000
	Medal "For the Victory over Japan" Медаль «За победу над Японией» Medal «Za pobedu nad Japoniej»	30 September 1945	Awarded to Soviet service personnel of the first and 2nd Far East Trans-Baikal Fronts, Pacific Fleet and Amur River Flotilla who were active between 8 August and 23 August 1945.	c. 1,831,000

== Civilian medals ==
Badge And Ribbon	Name (English/Russian/Translit)	Creation Date	Description	Number Awarded
	Medal "For Labour Valour" Медаль «За трудовую доблесть» Medal «Za trudovuyu doblest»	27 December 1938	Awarded to labourers who heroically dedicated themselves towards the building of a socialist society or have demonstrated a complete understanding of machinery/equipment to provide a high level of efficiency or for significant contributions in culture/science/manufacturing.	1,825,100
	Medal "For Distinguished Labour" Медаль «За трудовое отличие» Medal «Za trudovoe otlichie»	27 December 1938	Awarded to labourers who distinguished themselves with high production rates or for development of culture/science/manufacturing.	2,146,400
	Medal "For Valiant Labour in the Great Patriotic War 1941–1945" Медаль «За доблестный труд в Великой Отечественной войне 1941—1945 гг.» Medal «Za doblestnyj trud v Velikoj Otechestvennoj vojne 1941-1945 gg.»	6 June 1945	Awarded to all Soviet industrial workers for a term of one year or longer of labour during The Great Patriotic War. (6 months for disabled military veterans/professional school graduates/the retired who returned to work to aid.)	16,096,750
	Medal "For the Salvation of the Drowning" Медаль «За спасение утопающих» Medal «Za spasenie utopayushchikh»	16 February 1957	Awarded to any person (of any nationality) for courage, bravery and selflessness whilst rescuing a person/people from water or for outstanding vigilance and resourcefulness preventing drowning or for excellence in organising of rescue operations in Soviet waters or of Soviet citizens.	c. 24,000
	Medal "For Courage in a Fire" Медаль «За отвагу на пожаре» Medal «Za otvagu na pozhare»	30 October 1957	Awarded all Soviet citizens for courage and bravery in extinguishing fires or saving lives/state or private property from fire or for preventing explosions and fires.	c. 32,000
	Medal "Veteran of Labour" Медаль «Ветеран труда» Medal «Veteran truda»	18 January 1974	Awarded to deserving state workers at retirement.	c. 39,197,100

=== Development/restoration campaigns ===
Badge And Ribbon	Name (English/Russian/Translit)	Creation Date	Description	Number Awarded
	Medal "For the Restoration of the Donbass Coal Mines" Медаль «За восстановление угольных шахт Донбасса» Medal «Za vosstanovlenie ugl'nyh shaht Donbassa»	10 September 1947	Awarded to workers, clerks, engineering and business professionals, for outstanding work, high production performance and achievements in the recovery of the Donbass coal mines.	46,350
	Medal "For the Restoration of the Black Metallurgy Enterprises of the South" Медаль «За восстановление предприятий чёрной металлургии юга» Medal «Za vosstanovlenie predprijatij chernoj metallurgii yuga»	18 May 1948	Awarded to Soviet workers of outstanding performance in restoring the Black Metallurgic Enterprises of the Soviet Union which were destroyed during the Great Patriotic War. 13 blast furnaces, 49 open furnaces, 29 finishing mills and 68 coke-oven batteries were restored to effective or outstanding production rates.	68,710
	Medal "For the Development of Virgin Lands" Медаль «За освоение целинных земель» Medal «Za osvoenie tselinnyh zemel»	20 October 1956	Awarded to all Soviet workers who helped cultivate 36,000,000 hectares of previously uncultivated lands in Kazakhstan, Siberia, the Urals, the Volga area and the northern Caucasus for two solid years from 1954–56.	1,345,520
	Medal "For Construction of the Baikal-Amur Railway" Медаль «За строительство Байкало-Амурской магистрали» Medal «Za stroitel'stvo Bajkalo-Amurskoj magistrali»	8 October 1976	Awarded to workers on the Baikul-Amur Railway (BAM) for 2 years outstanding service between 1974 and 1984.	171,030
	Medal "For Transforming the Non-Black Earth of the RSFSR" Медаль «За преобразование Нечерноземья РСФСР» Medal «Za preobrazovanie Тechernozem'ja RSFSR»	30 September 1977	Awarded for 3 years outstanding service in developing Soviet agriculture.	c. 25,000
	Medal "For the Tapping of the Subsoil and Expansion of the Petrochemical Complex of Western Siberia" Медаль «За освоение недр и развитие нефтегазового комплекса Западной Сибири» Medal «Za osvoenie nedr i razvitie neftegazovogo kompleksa Zapadnoj Sibiri»	28 July 1978	Awarded for 3 years outstanding service in the Petrochemical Complex Of Western Siberia.	c. 38,000

=== Maternity medals ===
Badge And Ribbon	Name (English/Russian/Translit)	Creation Date	Description	Number Awarded
	Medal Maternity first class Медаль Материнства I степени Medal Materinstva I stepeni	8 July 1944	This decoration was awarded to all mothers bearing and raising 6 children. It was awarded upon the first birthday of the last child, provided that five other children (natural or adopted) remained alive. Children who had perished under heroic, military, or other respectful circumstances were also counted.	c. 4,000,000
	Medal Maternity 2nd class Медаль Материнства II степени Medal Materinstva II stepeni	8 July 1944	This decoration was awarded to all mothers bearing and raising five children. It was awarded upon the first birthday of the last child, provided that four other children (natural or adopted) remained alive. Children who had perished under heroic, military, or other respectful circumstances were also counted.	c. 8,000,000

== Commemorative medals ==
=== Soviet Armed Forces jubilees ===
Badge And Ribbon	Name (English/Russian/Translit)	Creation Date	Description	Number Awarded
	Jubilee Medal "XX Years of the Workers' and Peasants' Red Army" Юбилейная медаль «XX лет Рабоче-Крестьянской Красной Армии» Yubilejnaja medal «XX let Raboche-Krest'janskoj Krasnoj Armii»	24 January 1938	Awarded to Commanders of the Red Army and Navy for 20 years of service and also all who were decorated with the Order of the Red Banner during the Civil War.	37,504
	Jubilee Medal "30 Years of the Soviet Army and Navy" Юбилейная медаль «30 лет Советской Армии и Флота» Yubilejnaja medal «30 let Sovetskoj Armii i Flota»	22 February 1948	Awarded to everyone serving in the military of the Soviet Union on 23 February 1948	3,710,920
	Jubilee Medal "40 Years of the Armed Forces of the USSR" Юбилейная медаль «40 лет Вооружённых Сил СССР» Yubilejnaja medal «40 let Vooruzhennyh Sil SSSR»	18 December 1957	Awarded to everyone serving in the military of the Soviet Union 23 February 1958	820,080
	Jubilee Medal "50 Years of the Armed Forces of the USSR" Юбилейная медаль «50 лет Вооружённых Сил СССР» Yubilejnaja medal «50 let Vooruzhennyh Sil SSSR»	26 December 1967	Awarded to: all marshals, generals, officers, cadets, and volunteer enlisted men serving in the military of the Soviet Union and in Soviet state security organs.; All servicemen placed into the reserve or retired after twenty or more years in uniform; All those awarded the title of Hero of the Soviet Union or all three classes of the Order of Glory; All combat veterans, including Civil War and World War II partisans; all those awarded an order or medal for individual service, bravery or achievement regardless of length of service.	9,527,270
	Jubilee Medal "60 Years of the Armed Forces of the USSR" Юбилейная медаль «60 лет Вооружённых Сил СССР» Yubilejnaja medal «60 let Vooruzhennyh Sil SSSR»	28 January 1978	Awarded to: all marshals, generals, officers, and volunteer enlisted men serving in the military of the Soviet Union and in Soviet state security organs.; All servicemen placed into the reserve or retired after twenty or more years in uniform; All those awarded the title of Hero of the Soviet Union or all three classes of the Order of Glory; All combat veterans, including Civil War and World War II partisans; all those awarded an order or medal for individual service, bravery or achievement regardless of length of service.	10,723,340
	Jubilee Medal "70 Years of the Armed Forces of the USSR" Юбилейная медаль «70 лет Вооружённых Сил СССР» Yubilejnaja medal «70 let Vooruzhennyh Sil SSSR»	28 January 1988	Awarded to: all marshals, generals, officers, cadets, and volunteer enlisted men serving in the military of the Soviet Union and in Soviet state security organs.; All servicemen placed into the reserve or retired after twenty or more years in uniform; All those awarded the title of Hero of the Soviet Union or all three classes of the Order of Glory; All combat veterans, including Civil War and World War II partisans; all those awarded an order or medal for individual service, bravery or achievement regardless of length of service.	9,842,160

=== Second World War jubilees ===
Badge And Ribbon	Name (English/Russian/Translit)	Creation Date	Description	Number Awarded
	Jubilee Medal "Twenty Years of Victory in the Great Patriotic War 1941–1945" Юбилейная медаль «Двадцать лет Победы в Великой Отечественной войне 1941–1945 гг.» Yubilejnaja medal «Dvadtsat let Pobedy v Velikoj Otechestvennoj vojne 1941-1945 gg.»	7 May 1965	Awarded to all surviving participants of the Great Patriotic War as well as all active servicemen of the Soviet armed forces.	16,399,550
	Jubilee Medal "Thirty Years of Victory in the Great Patriotic War 1941–1945" Юбилейная медаль «Тридцать лет Победы в Великой Отечественной войне 1941–1945 гг.» Yubilejnaja medal «Tridtsat let Pobedy v Velikoj Otechestvennoj vojne 1941-1945 gg.»	25 April 1975	Awarded to all surviving participants of the Great Patriotic War. 3 variants were awarded. One was given to Veterans of the War, One was given to the Labour Front, and One was given to Foreign Participants.	14,259,560
	Jubilee Medal "Forty Years of Victory in the Great Patriotic War 1941–1945" Юбилейная медаль «Сорок лет Победы в Великой Отечественной войне 1941–1945 гг.» Yubilejnaja medal «Sorok let Pobedy v Velikoj Otechestvennoj vojne 1941-1945 gg.»	12 April 1985	Awarded to all surviving participants of the Great Patriotic War. 3 variants were awarded. One was given to Veterans of the War, One was given to the Labour Front, and One was given to Foreign Participants.	11,268,980

=== Other commemorative medals ===
Badge And Ribbon	Name (English/Russian/Translit)	Creation Date	Description	Number Awarded
	Medal "In Commemoration of the 800th Anniversary of Moscow" Медаль «В память 800-летия Москвы» Medal «V pamjat 800-letija Moskvy»	20 September 1947	Awarded to all citizens who participated in the restoration and reconstruction of Moscow. With Citizenship of Moscow of five years or more. Also awarded to all surviving holders of the Medal for the Defence of Moscow.	c. 1,730,000
	Medal "In Commemoration of the 250th Anniversary of Leningrad" Медаль «В память 250-летия Ленинграда» Medal «V pamjat 250-letija Leningrada»	16 May 1957	Awarded to all citizens who participated in the restoration and reconstruction of Leningrad. With Citizenship of Leningrad of five years or more. Also awarded to all surviving holders of the Medal for the Defence of Leningrad.	c. 1,440,000
	Medal "In Commemoration of the 1500th Anniversary of Kiev" Медаль «В память 1500-летия Киева» Medal «V pamjat 1500-letija Kieva»	10 May 1982	Awarded to citizens of Kiev who had lived there for at least 10 years and who contributed to the economic, social and cultural development of the city. Also awarded to all surviving holders of the Medal for the Defence of Kiev.	780,180
	Jubilee Medal "50 Years of the Soviet Militia" Юбилейная медаль «50 лет советской милиции» Medal «50 let sovetskoj militsii»	21 November 1967	Awarded to all members of the police serving on 21 November 1967 and to retirees with 25 years of service or more.	409,150
	Jubilee medal "For Valiant Labour in Commemoration of the 100th Anniversary since the Birth of Vladimir Il'ich Lenin" Юбилейная медаль «За доблестный труд в ознаменование 100-летия со дня рождения Владимира Ильича Ленина» Medal «Za doblestnyj trud v oznamenovanie 100-letija so dnja rozhdenija Vladimira Il'icha Lenina»	5 November 1969	Awarded to highly skilled senior workers, farmers, specialists of the national economy, employees of public institutions and public organizations, scientists and cultural figures, who displayed the highest examples of work in preparation for the anniversary of Lenin; to those who took an active part in the struggle for the establishment of Soviet power, or to protect the homeland, or who have made a significant contribution to their work in the building of socialism in the USSR, who helped the party to educate the younger generation by their personal example and social activities.	9,000,000
	Jubilee medal "For Military Valour in Commemoration of the 100th Anniversary since the Birth of Vladimir Il'ich Lenin" Юбилейная медаль «За воинскую доблесть в ознаменование 100-летия со дня рождения Владимира Ильича Ленина» Medal «Za voinskuju doblest v oznamenovanie 100-letija so dnja rozhdenija Vladimira Il'icha Lenina»	5 November 1969	Awarded to soldiers of the Soviet Army, sailors of the Navy, troops of the Ministry of Internal Affairs, troops of the State Security Committee of the Council of Ministers of the USSR, who displayed excellent performance in combat and political training, good results in the management and maintenance of combat readiness in preparation for the anniversary of Lenin.	2,000,000
	Jubilee medal "In Commemoration of the 100th Anniversary since the Birth of Vladimir Il'ich Lenin" Юбилейная медаль «В ознаменование 100-летия со дня рождения Владимира Ильича Ленина» Medal «V oznamenovanie 100-letija so dnja rozhdenija Vladimira Il'icha Lenina»	5 November 1969	Awarded to foreign leaders of the international communist and labour movement and other progressive activists abroad.	11,005,000

Note: Several Soviet decorations were worn in full, so a ribbon bar was not created. However, since the fall of the USSR, some medals have had ribbon bars created for them. An asterisk, *, denotes these medals. Awards not showing a ribbon are worn in full at all times.

== See also ==
- Orders and Medals of Soviet Republics
- Badges and Decorations of the Soviet Union
- Orders, decorations, and medals of the Russian Federation
- Awards and Emblems of the Ministry of Defence of the Russian Federation
- Awards of the Ministry for Emergency Situations of Russia
- Awards of the Ministry of Internal Affairs of Russia
- Awards of the Federal Border Service of the Russian Federation
- Honorary weapons of Russia
- Honorary titles of the Russian Federation
- Orders, decorations, and medals of Belarus
- List of awards of independent services of the Russian Federation
- List of "Umalatova" awards
- Socialist orders of merit

== Sources ==
- Paul D. McDaniel, Paul J. Schmitt (1997). The Comprehensive Guide to Soviet Orders and Medals. ISBN 0-9656289-0-6.
- V.D. Krivchov (2003). AVERS No. 6 Definitive Catalog of Soviet Orders and Medals. Moscow.
- V.D. Krivchov (2008). AVERS No. 8 Definitive Catalog of Soviet Badges and Jetons 1917–1980. Moscow.
