= Medal "For Distinction in Military Service" =

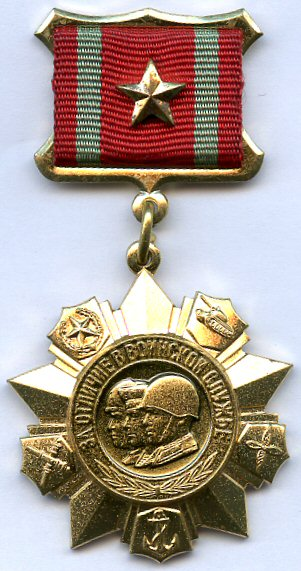
- Medal "For Distinction in Military Service" 1st class (obverse)
- Type: Military Decoration
- Awarded for: Excellence in combat and political training
- Presented by: Soviet Union; Russian Federation
- Eligibility: Citizens of the Soviet Union
- Status: No longer awarded
- Established: October 28, 1974
- First award: March 24, 1975
- Final award: 1995

Highlights
- Total: 1st class ~ 20,000; 2nd class ~ 120,000

The Medal "For Distinction in Military Service" (Russian: Медаль «За отличие в воинской службе») was a military decoration awarded in two classes by the Soviet Union and later by the Russian Federation (until 1995), to deserving military personnel of the Ministry of Defense, of internal troops and of border troops of both the USSR and Russian Federation. It was gradually phased out following the dissolution of the USSR being replaced by various ministerial awards.

== Award history ==
The Medal "For Distinction in Military Service" was established on October 28, 1974 by Decree of the Presidium of the Supreme Soviet. Its statute was later amended by the Decree of the Presidium of the Supreme Soviet № 2523-X on July 18, 1980.

The award was one of the very few Soviet decorations to be retained "as is" following the dissolution of the USSR. This was confirmed by Decree of the Presidium of the Supreme Council of the Russian Federation № 2424-1 of March 2, 1992. It was last awarded in 1995 being replaced by various ministerial decorations such as the decoration "For Distinction in Service of Interior Troops of Russia" also awarded in two classes.

== Award statute ==
The Medal "For Distinction in Military Service" was awarded to soldiers of the Soviet Army, Navy, border and internal troops: for excellent performance in combat and political training; for special distinction in exercises and manoeuvres in combat service and combat duty; for bravery, selflessness, and other services, displayed during military service.

The award was divided into two classes, first and second, the first class being the highest. They were awarded sequentially for continued merit. Each medal came with an attestation of award, this attestation came in the form of a small 8 cm by 11 cm cardboard booklet bearing the award's name, the recipient's particulars and an official stamp and signature on the inside.

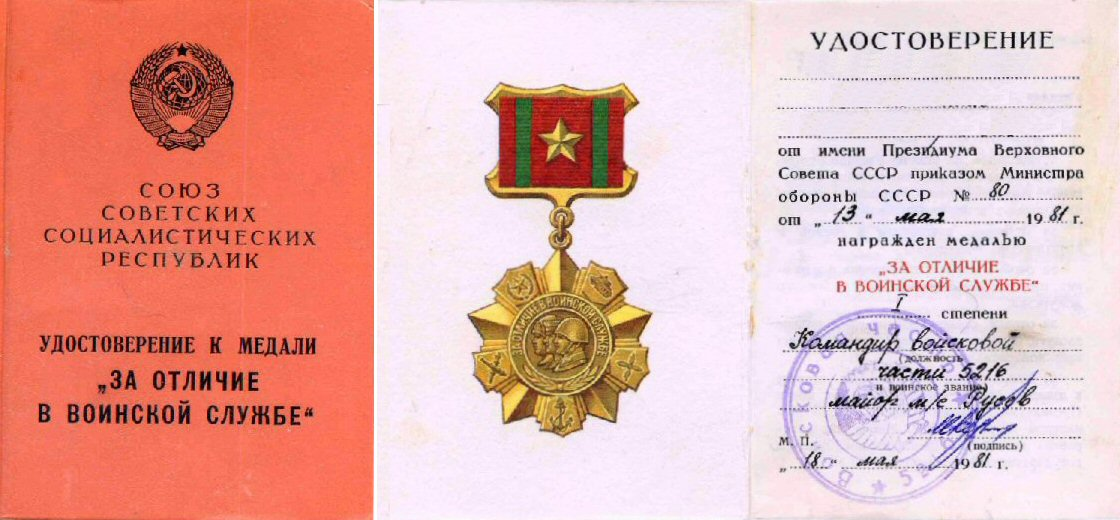
Award attestation document of the Medal "For Distinction in Military Service" 1st class (cover and inside pages

The Medal "For Distinction in Military Service" was worn on the right side of the chest following the orders of the USSR. When not worn, its ribbon's order of precedence in the ribbon bar is immediately after the ribbon of the Medal "For Distinction in Guarding the State Border of the USSR". If worn with honorary titles or Orders of the Russian Federation, the latter have precedence.

== Award description ==
The Medal "For Distinction in Military Service" was a 38mm wide five pointed convex star. Five shields bearing the emblems of the main branches of the service filled the gaps between its arms. The obverse bore a central concave medallion bearing the relief images of a soldier, sailor and airman. The central medallion was framed by a ring bearing the relief inscription "For Distinction in Military Service" (Russian: «За отличие в воинской службе») on the sides and top, at the bottom of the ring, two laurel branches. The plain reverse only bore the mark of the Moscow Mint "MMD" (Russian: «ММД») at the bottom.

The medal was secured to a 29,5mm wide by 27,5mm square mount by a ring through the suspension loop. The mount was covered by a red silk moiré ribbon with two 3mm green stripes located 3mm from the ribbon edges.

The medal first class, the metallic parts of its ribbon mount and the star device on its ribbon were made of brass. The medal second class, the metallic parts of its ribbon mount and the star device on its ribbon were made of cupronickel.

First Class	Second Class	Reverse

== Recipients (partial list) ==
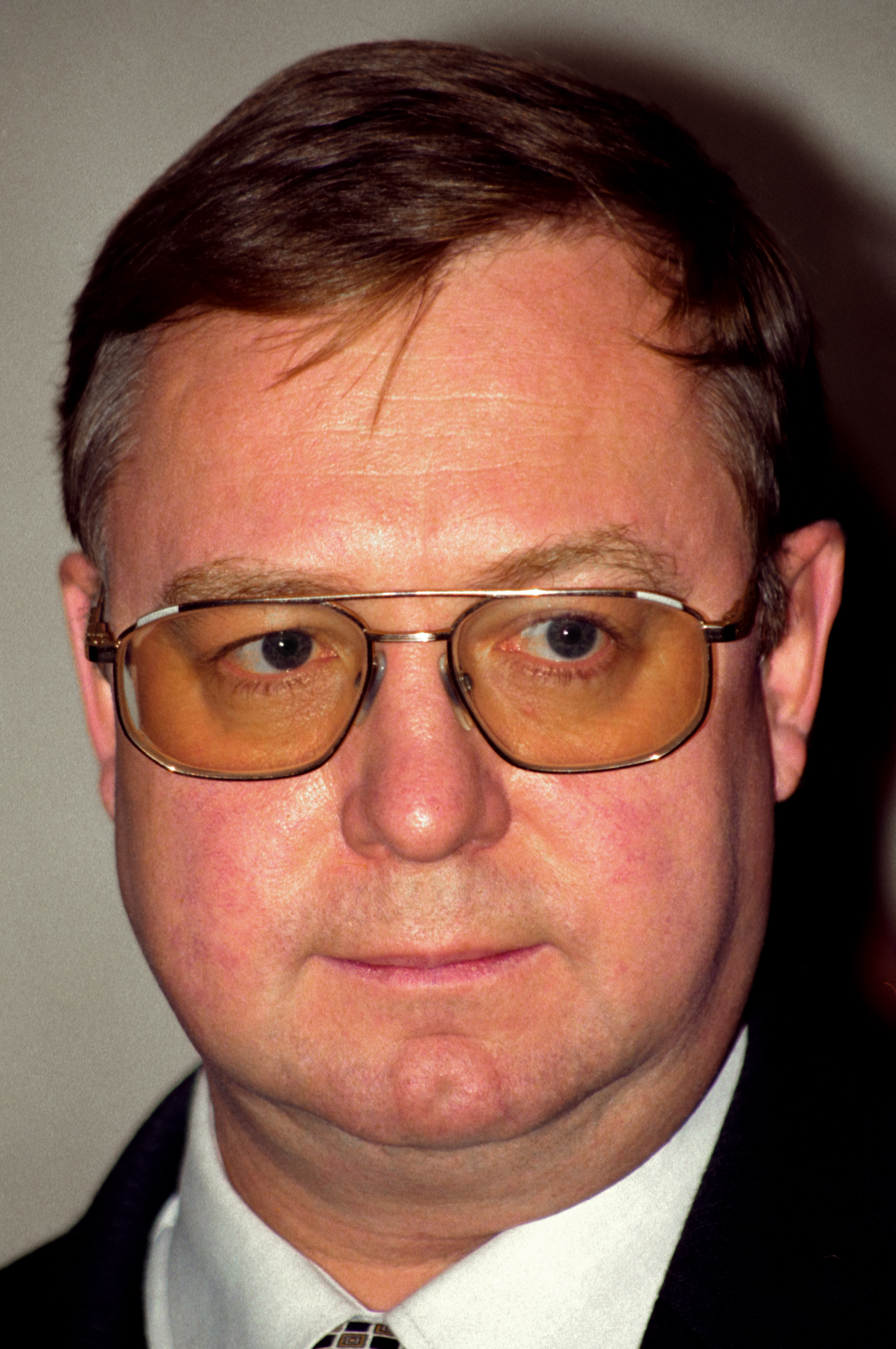
Former Prime Minister of Russia Sergei Stepashin, a recipient of both classes of the Medal "For Distinction in Military Service"

The individuals below were all recipients of the Medal "For Distinction in Military Service".

- Former Prime Minister of Russia Sergei Vadimovich Stepashin
- Lieutenant General Cosmonaut Vasily Vasiliyevich Tsibliyev
- Lieutenant General Ruslan Sultanovich Aushev
- Colonel General Nikolay Nikolayevich Bordyuzha
- Army General and Russian Interior Minister Rashid Gumarovich Nurgaliyev
- Lieutenant General Vladimir Anatolyevich Shamanov

== See also ==
- Orders, decorations, and medals of the Soviet Union
- Badges and Decorations of the Soviet Union
- Awards and Emblems of the Ministry of Defence of the Russian Federation
- Awards and decorations of the Russian Federation
- Awards of the Ministry of Internal Affairs of Russia
- Awards of the Federal Border Service of the Russian Federation
