= Honoured Test Navigator of the USSR =

Honorary title Merited Test Navigator of the USSR
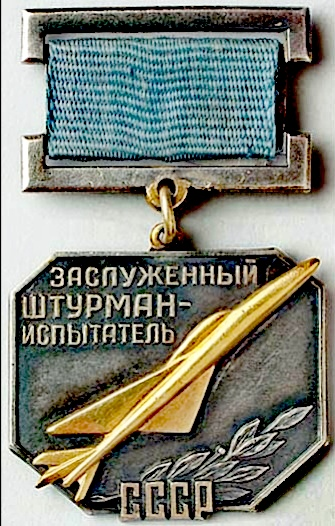
- Obverse of the chest badge "Honoured Test Navigator of the USSR"
- Type: Title of honour
- Awarded for: Excellence in flight research and testing of aircraft
- Presented by: Soviet Union Presidium of the Supreme Soviet
- Eligibility: Citizens of the Soviet Union
- Status: No longer awarded
- Established: August 14, 1958
- First award: October 7, 1959
- Related: Merited Test Pilot of the USSR

The Honorary Title "Merited Test Navigator of the USSR" (Russian: Заслуженный штурман-испытатель СССР) was a military and civilian state award of the Soviet Union. It was established on August 14, 1958, by Decree of the Presidium of the Supreme Soviet No. 2523-X, to recognise courage and outstanding service in experimental aviation. Its statute was confirmed on August 22, 1988, by Decree of the Presidium of the Supreme Soviet No. 9441-XI. The title ceased to be awarded following the December 1991 dissolution of the Soviet Union.

== Award status ==
The title was awarded to military and civilian test navigators 1st class of the civilian aircraft industry and of the Ministry of Defence of the USSR, for multiple years of work in researching and testing new aviation technologies.

The Presidium of the Supreme Soviet of the USSR was the main conferring authority of the award, based on recommendations from the Ministry of Defence (Russian: Министерство обороны СССР) or from the Ministry of Aviation Industry (Russian: Министерство авиационной промышленности СССР).

The "Merited Military Test Navigator of the USSR" badge was worn on the right side of the chest and, in the presence of other orders, placed above them. If worn with honorary titles of the Russian Federation, the latter have precedence.

== Award description ==
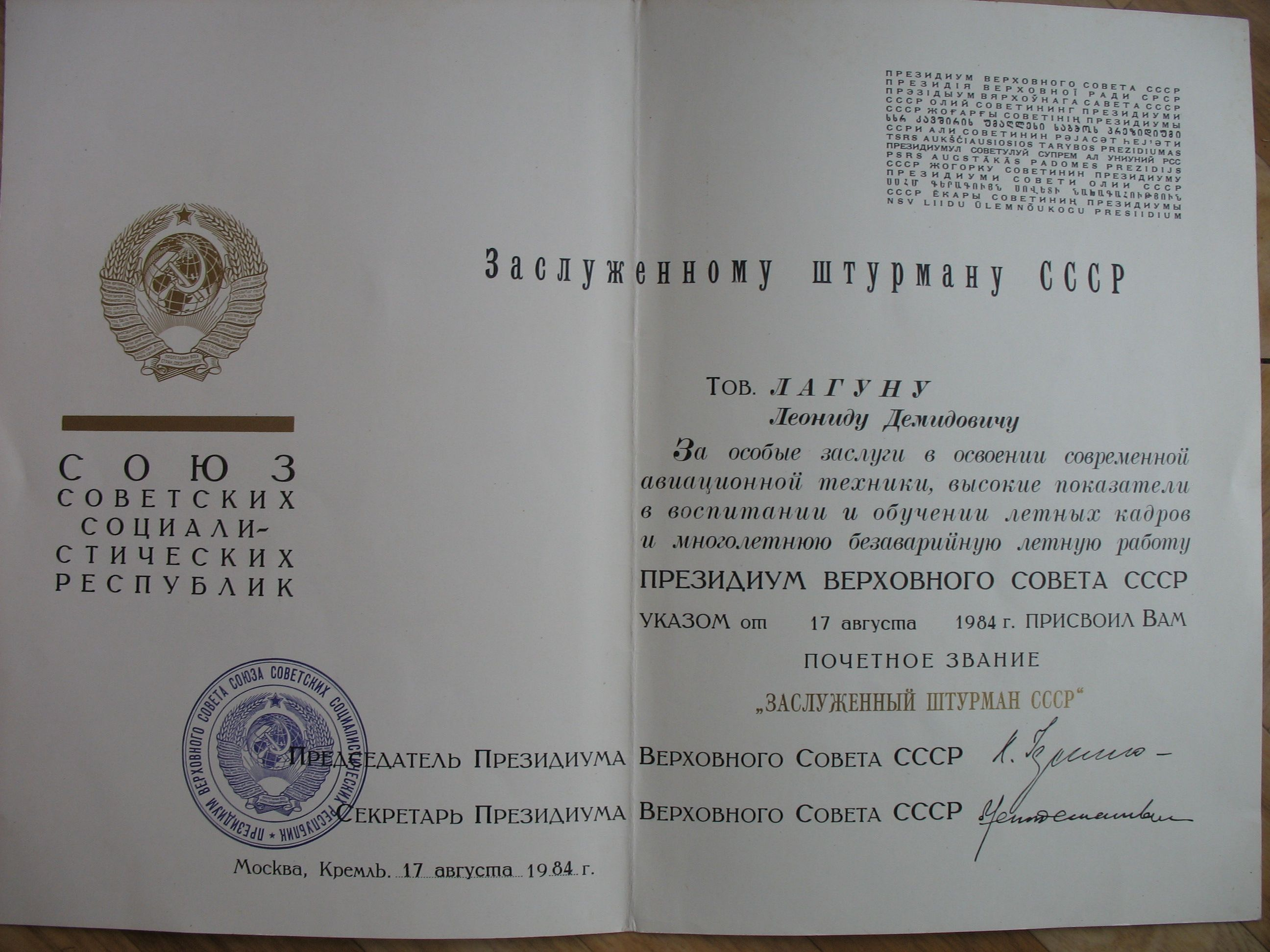
Merited Test Navigator of the USSR card

The badge was a 27mm wide by 23mm high silver and nickel polygon with raised edges. At the top of the obverse, the relief inscription "MERITED TEST NAVIGATOR" (Russian: ЗАСЛУЖЕННЫЙ ШТУРМАН-ИСПЫТАТЕЛЬ) is in three lines to the left. In the center, there is a gilt tombac image of a jet plane climbing diagonally towards the right, its nose and tail slightly protruding over the edges. At the bottom, the relief inscription "USSR" (Russian: СССР) is superimposed over a laurel branch.

The badge was secured to a standard Soviet square mount by a silver-plated ring through the suspension loop. The mount was covered by a silk moiré blue ribbon.

== See also ==
- Orders, decorations, and medals of the Soviet Union
- Badges and Decorations of the Soviet Union
- Soviet Air Force
