= Medal "For the Tapping of the Subsoil and Expansion of the Petrochemical Complex of Western Siberia" =

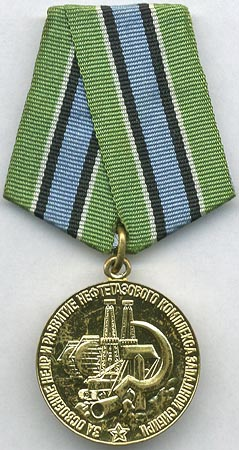
- Medal "For the Tapping of the Subsoil and Expansion of the Petrochemical Complex of Western Siberia" (obverse)
- Type: Civilian medal
- Awarded for: Three years of outstanding service in the Petrochemical Complex of Western Siberia
- Presented by: Soviet Union
- Eligibility: Citizens of the Soviet Union
- Status: No longer awarded
- Established: July 28, 1978

Highlights
- Total: ~25,000
- Ribbon of the Medal "For the Tapping of the Subsoil and Expansion of the Petrochemical Complex of Western Siberia"

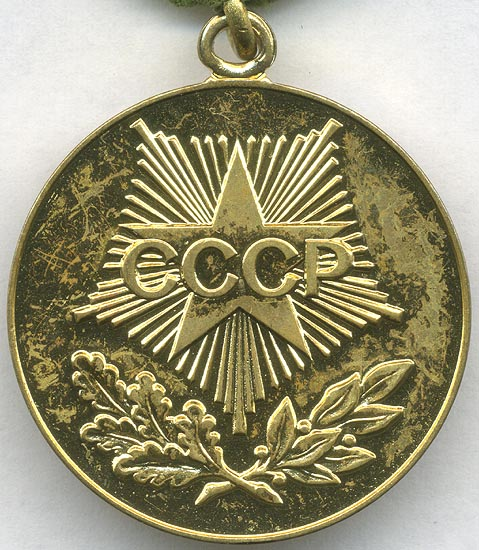
Reverse of the Medal "For the Tapping of the Subsoil and Expansion of the Petrochemical Complex of Western Siberia"

The Medal "For the Tapping of the Subsoil and Expansion of the Petrochemical Complex of Western Siberia" (Russian: Медаль «За освоение недр и развитие нефтегазового комплекса Западной Сибири») was a civilian award of the Soviet Union established on July 28, 1978 by Decree of the Presidium of the Supreme Soviet of the USSR to recognise three years of dedicated work in developing the Petrochemical Complex of Western Siberia.

== Medal statute ==
The Medal "For the Tapping of the Subsoil and Expansion of the Petrochemical Complex of Western Siberia" was awarded to active members in the underground exploration and development of the oil and gas complex of Western Siberia for selfless labour in the identification, exploration and development of the mining and industrial processing of oil and gas, for work in construction, in manufacturing, in housing and other civilian facilities, in building highways, in electricity, transport or other services to the oil and gas industries, as well as to employees of scientific, research or design organizations, of institutions and organizations, of the service sector, Party, Soviet, trade union or Komsomol organs of the oil and gas industry, who produced conscientious work and contributed to the development of the petrochemical complex of Western Siberia over a period of at least three years.

Recommendations for award of the Medal "For the Tapping of the Subsoil and Expansion of the Petrochemical Complex of Western Siberia" were made by the administrative heads of enterprises, institutions, organizations, party, trade union or Komsomol organizations or labour collectives and the executive committees of the District or City Council of People's Deputies. The names of the potential recipients were then forwarded to the various ministries and agencies overseeing the different companies and organisations which were working in the development of the petrochemical complex of Western Siberia for approval. The names of the recipients was then forwarded to the executive committees of the Tyumen or Tomsk oblasts Soviets of People's Deputies for award on behalf of the Presidium of the Supreme Soviet of the USSR and of the Presidium of the Supreme Soviet of the RSFSR.

The Medal "For the Tapping of the Subsoil and Expansion of the Petrochemical Complex of Western Siberia" was worn on the left side of the chest and in the presence of other medals of the USSR, immediately after the Medal "For Transforming the Non-Black Earth of the RSFSR". If worn in the presence of awards of the Russian Federation, the latter have precedence.

Each medal came with an attestation of award, this attestation came in the form of a small 8 cm by 11 cm cardboard booklet bearing the award's name, the recipient's particulars and an official stamp and signature on the inside.

== Medal description ==
The Medal "For the Tapping of the Subsoil and Expansion of the Petrochemical Complex of Western Siberia" was a 32 mm in diameter circular brass medal. On its obverse, in the right half, the relief image of a sickle over a vertical hammer, in the background, the relief images of two oil rigs at center, two gas tanks at left, a tractor and piping at lower center, at the bottom a small relief five pointed star, along the medal circumference, the relief inscription "For the tapping of the subsoil and expansion of the petrochemical complex of Western Siberia" (Russian: «За освоение недр и развитие нефтегазового комплекса Западной Сибири»). On the reverse, in the central upper half, a relief five pointed star emitting rays from between its arms forming an inversed pentagon, superimposed over the star, the relief inscription "USSR" (Russian: «СССР»), at the bottom, crossed laurel and oak branches.

The Medal "For the Tapping of the Subsoil and Expansion of the Petrochemical Complex of Western Siberia" was secured to a standard Soviet pentagonal mount by a ring through the medal suspension loop. The mount was covered by a 24 mm wide overlapping green silk moiré ribbon with a 6 mm wide central blue stripe bordered on both sides by 2 mm black stripes themselves bordered on the outside by 1 mm wide white stripes.

== Recipients (partial list) ==
The individuals below were recipients of the Medal "For the Tapping of the Subsoil and Expansion of the Petrochemical Complex of Western Siberia".

- Ivan Yegorovich Korovin
- Vladimir Leonidovich Bogdanov
- Aleksandr Yakovlevich Kosyakov
- Andrei Philipovich Mukha
- Viktor Yanukovych Redikultsev
- Aleksandr Viktorovich Sarychev
- Solokhin Valentin Fedorovich
- Valentina Fedorovna Arova
- Dmitry Vasilyevich Makuschenko
- Alexander Karlovich Shpeter
- Sergey Evgenevich Korepanov
- Irek Saitgalievich Kharisov
- Tamara Fedorovna Bortsova
- Vladimir Dmitrievich Bykovsky
- Igor Vladimirovich Belousenko

== See also ==
- Orders, decorations, and medals of the Soviet Union
