= Jubilee Medal "50 Years of the Soviet Militia" =

Commemorative medal of the Soviet Union

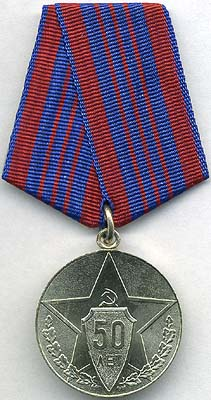
- Jubilee Medal "50 Years of the Soviet Militia" (obverse)
- Type: Commemorative medal
- Awarded for: Excellence and long service in the Russian Militia
- Presented by: Soviet Union
- Eligibility: Citizens of the Soviet Union
- Status: No longer awarded
- Established: November 20, 1967

Highlights
- Total: 409,150
- Ribbon of the Jubilee Medal "50 Years of the Soviet Militia"

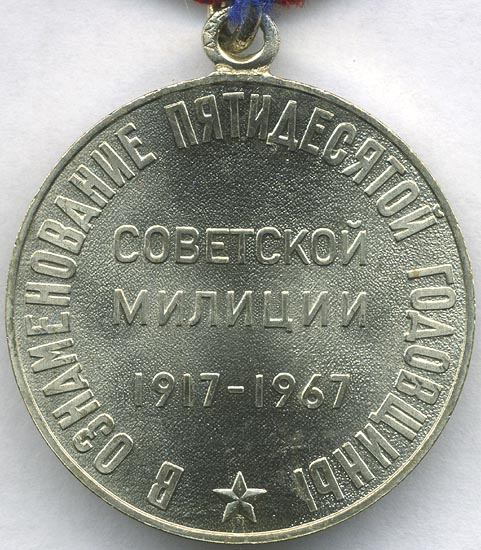
Reverse of the Jubilee Medal "50 Years of the Soviet Militia"

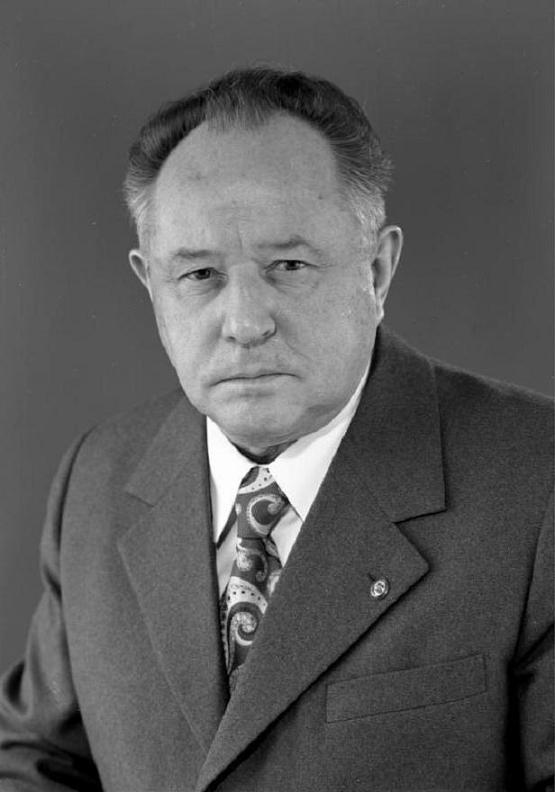
Head of the East German Stasi Erich Mielke, a recipient of the Jubilee Medal "50 Years of the Soviet Militia"

The Jubilee Medal "50 Years of the Soviet Militia" (Russian: Юбилейная медаль «50 лет советской милиции») was a state commemorative medal of the Soviet Union established by decree of the Presidium of the Supreme Soviet of the USSR on November 20, 1967 to commemorate the fiftieth anniversary of the creation of the Soviet Militia, it was mainly awarded to deserving members of the state police. Its statute was amended on July 18, 1980 by decree of the Presidium of the Supreme Soviet.

== Medal Statute ==
The Jubilee Medal "50 Years of the Soviet Militia" was awarded to: meritorious personnel of higher, senior, and middle management as well as to junior officers and rank and file police officers, who, as of 21 November 1967, were in the service of the organs, agencies and institutions of the Ministry of Public Order of the USSR; to persons who have a special police rank who were dismissed from the organs of public order, in the reserves or retired with service of 25 years or more. May also be awarded to personnel of higher, senior and middle management as well as to junior officers and enlisted personnel of other services and departments of the Ministry of Public Order of the USSR, who actively contributed and assisted police authorities in their activities.

The conferring authority was the Presidium of the Supreme Soviet of the USSR based on recommendations from the Minister of Public Order of the USSR, the ministers of public order of union and autonomous republics, the heads of the departments of public order of the executive committees of regional, provincial, municipal, road departments (offices) and the police educational institutions of the Ministry of Public Order of the USSR. Each medal came with an attestation of award, this attestation came in the form of a small 8 cm by 11 cm cardboard booklet bearing the award's name, the recipient's particulars and an official stamp and signature on the inside.

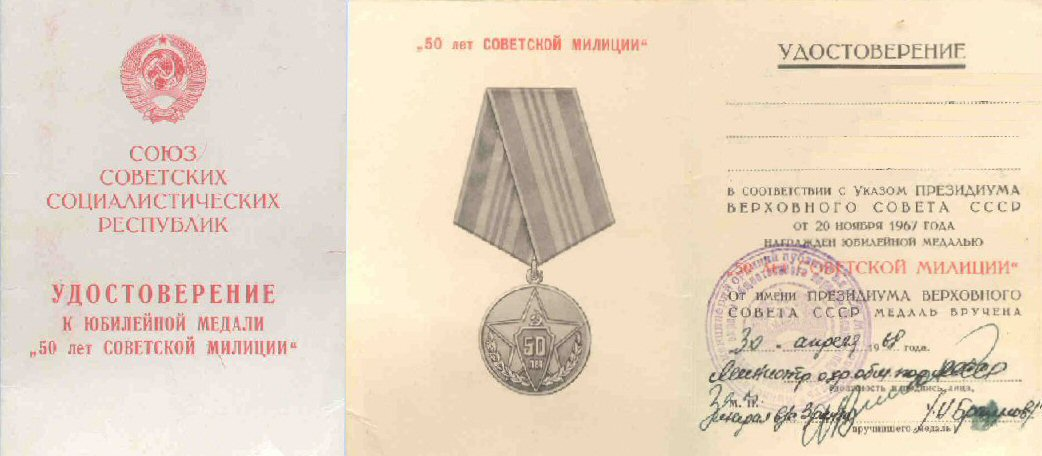
Award document of the Jubilee Medal "50 Years of the Soviet Militia" (cover and inside pages)

The Jubilee Medal "50 Years of the Soviet Militia" was worn on the left side of the chest and in the presence of other medals of the Soviet Union, immediately following the Jubilee Medal "60 Years of the Armed Forces of the USSR". When worn in the presence of orders and medals of the Russian Federation, the latter have precedence.

== Medal Description ==
The Jubilee Medal "50 Years of the Soviet Militia" was a 32mm in diameter circular copper-nickel alloy medal. On the obverse, a large five pointed star with all five points touching the rim of the medal. At the base of the star’s upper point, the hammer and sickle in relief. Beginning in the center of the star, a relief shield bearing the prominent inscription on two lines "50 YEARS" (Russian: «50 ЛЕТ»), the bottom of the shield touching the lower rim of the medal. Along the lower circumference of the medal, two oak branches going up to the lateral points of the star. On the reverse the circular inscription following the medal’s circumference: "In commemoration of the fiftieth anniversary of" (Russian: «В ознаменование пятидесятой годовщины»), and in the center on three lines "Soviet police" (Russian: «советской милиции») and the dates "1917-1967", at the bottom, the relief image of a small five-pointed star.

The medal is secured to a standard Soviet pentagonal mount by a ring through the medal suspension loop. The mount is covered by a 24mm wide blue silk moiré ribbon with three 1mm wide central red stripes separated by 2mm, and two largers 4.5mm red stripes situated 1mm from the edges.

== Recipients (partial list) ==
The individuals listed below are recipients of the Jubilee Medal "50 Years of the Soviet Militia".

- Soviet Marshal Dmitriy Feodorovich Ustinov, then secretary of the Central Committee with oversight over certain security organs
- Erich Fritz Emil Mielke, East German Minister of State Security
- Colonel Yevgeny Khrunov
- Major General Viktor Gorbatko
- Major General Vladimir Dzhanibekov
- Former President of the Belarusian Soviet Socialist Republic Pyotr Masherov
- Militia General Alexey Gurgenovich Hekimyan
- Deputy Minister of the Interior Akhmed Kudyshevich Suleimenov
- Former policeman Nikolai Platonovich Putintsev
- Minister of Internal Affairs of the Kazakh SSR Mikhail Terent'evich Bersenyev

== See also ==
- Soviet Militia
- Orders, decorations, and medals of the Soviet Union
- Badges and Decorations of the Soviet Union
