= Honoured Navigator of the USSR =

Honorary title Honoured Navigator of the USSR
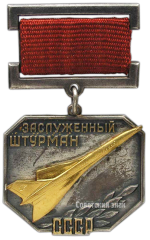
- Obverse of the chest badge "Honoured Navigator of the USSR"
- Type: Honorary title
- Awarded for: Excellence in civil aviation airmanship
- Presented by: USSR
- Eligibility: Citizens of the Soviet Union
- Status: No longer awarded
- Established: September 30, 1965
- First award: August 16, 1966
- Related: Honoured Pilot of the USSR

The Honorary Title "Honoured Navigator of the USSR" (Russian: Заслуженный штурман СССР) was a civilian state award of the Soviet Union established on September 30, 1965, by Decree of the Presidium of the Supreme Soviet of the USSR No. 3993-VI to recognise excellence in civilian aviation. It was abolished on August 22, 1988, by Decree of the Presidium of the Supreme Soviet No. 9441-XI.

== Award Statute ==
The honorary title "Honoured Navigator of the USSR" was awarded to qualified civilian navigators 1st class for special merit in the development of modern aircraft, in the use of the most advanced navigating techniques, for the highest standards in education and training of flight personnel, for long-term trouble-free flying and for outstanding achievements in the use of aviation in the national economy.

The Presidium of the Supreme Soviet of the USSR was the main conferring authority of the award based on recommendations of the Minister for Civil Aviation of the USSR.

The chest badge "Honoured Navigator of the USSR" was worn on the right side of the chest and in the presence of other orders, placed over them. If worn with honorary titles of the Russian Federation, the latter have precedence.

== Award Description ==
The "Honoured Navigator of the USSR" chest badge was a 27mm wide by 23mm high silver and nickel polygon with raised edges. At the top of the obverse, the relief inscription in two lines covered to the left "HONOURED NAVIGATOR" (Russian: ЗАСЛУЖЕННЫЙ ШТУРМАН), in the center, the gilt tombac image of a jet transport aircraft climbing diagonally towards the right, at the bottom, the relief inscription "USSR" (Russian: СССР) superimposed over a laurel branch.

The badge was secured to a standard Soviet square mount by a silver-plated ring through the suspension loop. The mount was covered by a red silk moiré ribbon. It was secured to clothing with a pin attachment or with a threaded stud and nut.

== See also ==
- Orders, decorations, and medals of the Soviet Union
- Badges and Decorations of the Soviet Union
- Soviet Air Force
