= Georgi Benkunsky =

Georgi Stanislavovich Benkunsky (Russian: Георгий Станиславович Бенкунский, 1913–1995) was a Russian Soviet pilot, a war hero and an Honoured Pilot of the USSR.

Benkunsky was born in 1913 in Kasimov in what was then the Russian Empire. His father, Stanislav Gilyarievich Benkunsky (1880–1920), was from the nobility of Vilna Province and fought in the Russo-Japanese War of 1904–1905, where he won the Order of St. George. His mother, Varvara Semyonovna Yukawa (1884–1952), was graduated from the Medical Institute in Kharkov and worked as a pharmacist in Yegoryevsk. She was a recipient of the Order of Lenin.

Benkunsky was graduated from the Balashov Higher Military Aviation School in 1933, after which he was posted to Irkutsk with the Ninth Air Group; one of the unit's itineraries was Irkutsk-Yakutsk-Bodaibo which at this time was nicknamed "Route Courage".

From the beginning of the German-Soviet Campaign of World War II (called, in the Soviet Union, the Great Patriotic War), Benkunsky was part of the Special Purpose Transport Air Fleet of the Moscow Air Group, equipped with Lisunov Li-2s (license built Douglas DC-3s). In his aircraft the "Sky Snail" Benkunsky flew missions in defiance of German fighters in the skies over Moscow, then Leningrad, then Stalingrad, Sevastopol and the Caucasus – wherever the need and danger was greatest. During the war, Li-2s were used for transport, partisan supply, as ambulance aircraft, and even for bombing. Benkunsky was the only Aeroflot pilot to be awarded four Orders of Lenin. He also received other awards and medals including the Order of the Red Banner of Labour and the Order of the Red Star.

On August 12, 1944, Benkunsky and his crew flew the Soviet diplomatic delegation for the development of the United Nations Charter, headed by Ambassador Andrei Gromyko, from Moscow to Washington, D. C.

After the war, Benkunsky flew a total of nearly thirty thousand hours. He flew to the United States over the North Pole, and to Africa, Western Europe, and Asia. He mastered several kinds of piston engine and turboprop civil aviation aircraft. For his many accomplishments and for his exemplary leadership and training of younger aviators, Benkunskogo was made an Honoured Pilot of the USSR in 1971.

Benkunsky died on February 10, 1995, and was buried in Moscow. The eighth Sukhoi Superjet 100 off the production line was named "Georgi Benkunsky" in his honor.
