= Jubilee Medal "Twenty Years of Victory in the Great Patriotic War 1941–1945" =

Commemorative medal of the Soviet Union

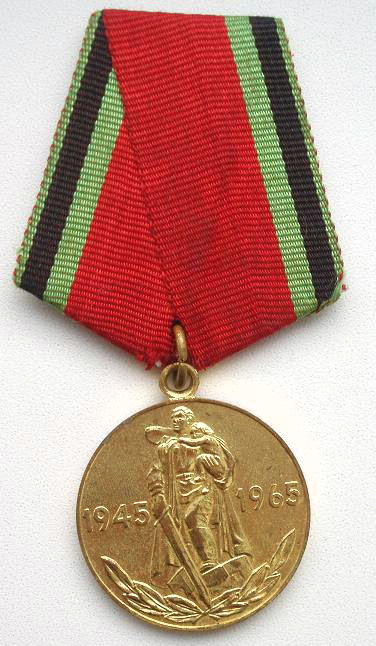
- Jubilee Medal "Twenty Years of Victory in the Great Patriotic War 1941–1945" (obverse) featuring Der Befreier
- Type: Jubilee medal
- Awarded for: Participation in World War 2 in the Soviet Armed Forces
- Presented by: USSR
- Eligibility: Citizens of the Soviet Union
- Status: No longer awarded
- Established: May 7, 1965

Highlights
- Total: 16,399,550
- Ribbon of the Jubilee Medal "Twenty Years of Victory in the Great Patriotic War 1941–1945"

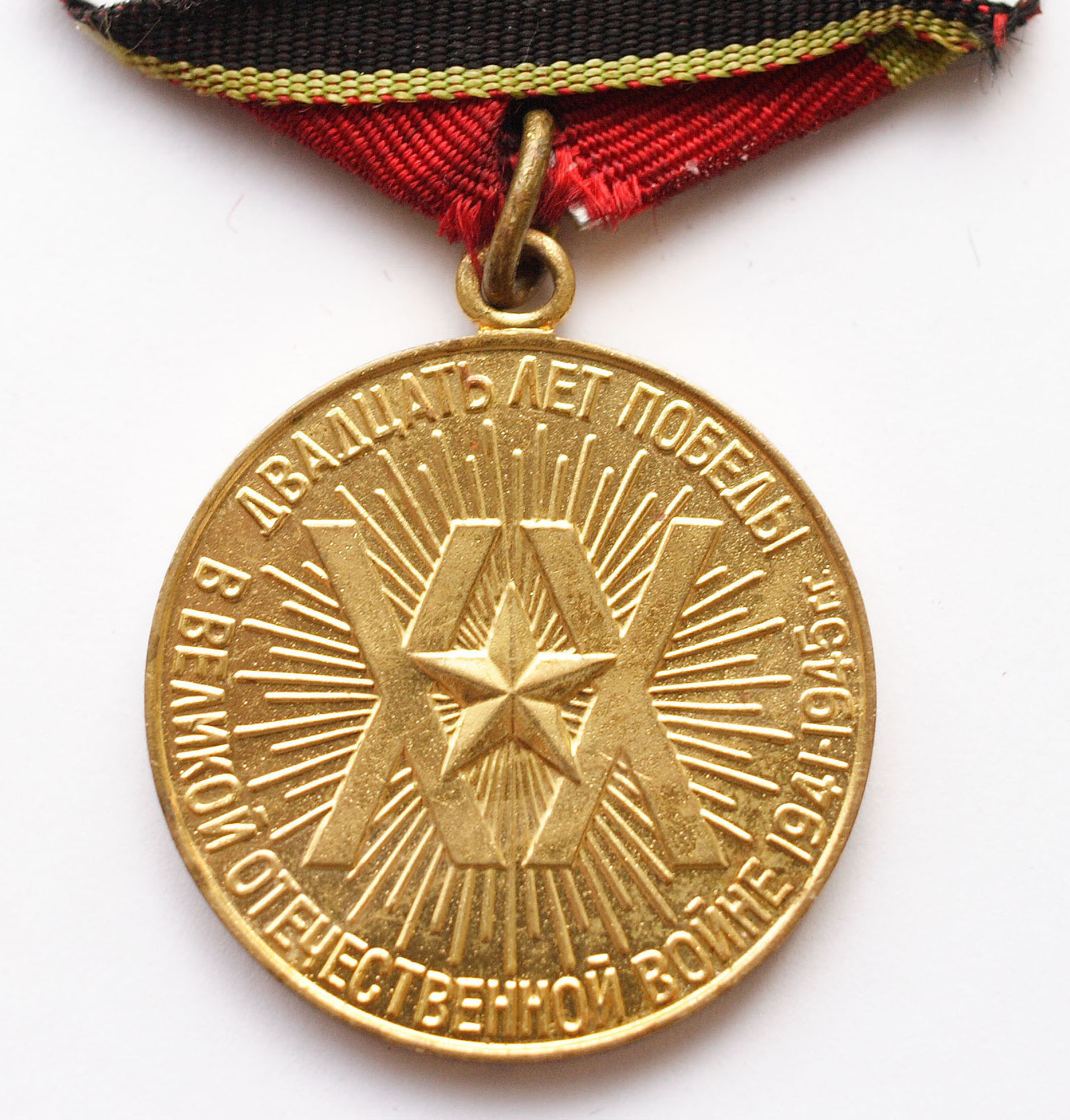
Reverse of the Jubilee Medal "Twenty Years of Victory in the Great Patriotic War 1941–1945"

The Jubilee Medal "Twenty Years of Victory in the Great Patriotic War 1941–1945" (Russian: Юбилейная медаль «Двадцать лет Победы в Великой Отечественной войне 1941–1945 гг.») was a state commemorative medal of the Soviet Union established on May 7, 1965 by decree of the Presidium of the Supreme Soviet of the USSR to denote the twentieth anniversary of the Soviet victory over Nazi Germany in World War II.

== Medal statute ==
The Jubilee Medal "Twenty Years of Victory in the Great Patriotic War 1941–1945" was awarded to: all military and civilian personnel of the Armed Forces of the USSR who took part in the Great Patriotic War of 1941–1945, to partisans of the Great Patriotic War, to the personnel of the Armed Forces of the USSR, as well as any other persons who were awarded the Medal "For the Victory over Germany in the Great Patriotic War 1941–1945".

The medal was awarded on behalf of the Presidium of the Supreme Soviet of the USSR by commanders of military units, formations, the heads of agencies, institutions; by republican, territorial, regional, district or municipal military commissariats.

The Jubilee Medal "Twenty Years of Victory in the Great Patriotic War 1941–1945" was worn on the left side of the chest and in the presence of other orders and medals of the USSR, was located immediately following the Medal "For the Victory over Germany in the Great Patriotic War 1941–1945". If worn in the presence of orders and medals of the Russian federation, the latter have precedence.

== Medal description ==
The Jubilee Medal "Twenty Years of Victory in the Great Patriotic War 1941–1945" was a 32mm in diameter circular brass medal. On its obverse, the relief image of the caped Soviet soldier-liberator, holding a child in his left arm and a mighty sword cutting through a swastika in the other, standing over two oak branches. On his left the date in prominent numbers "1945", on his right "1965". On the reverse, along the circumference of the medal, the relief inscription "Twenty Years of Victory in the Great Patriotic War of 1941–1945" (Russian: "Двадцать лет победы в Великой Отечественной войне 1941–1945 гг."). In center, a relief five pointed star overlapping the Roman numeral "XX" over a background of diverging rays.

The medal was secured to a standard Soviet pentagonal mount by a ring through the medal suspension loop. The mount was covered by a 24mm wide red silk moiré ribbon with stripes on the right side beginning at the edge, 1mm green, 3mm black and 3mm green.

== Recipients (partial list) ==
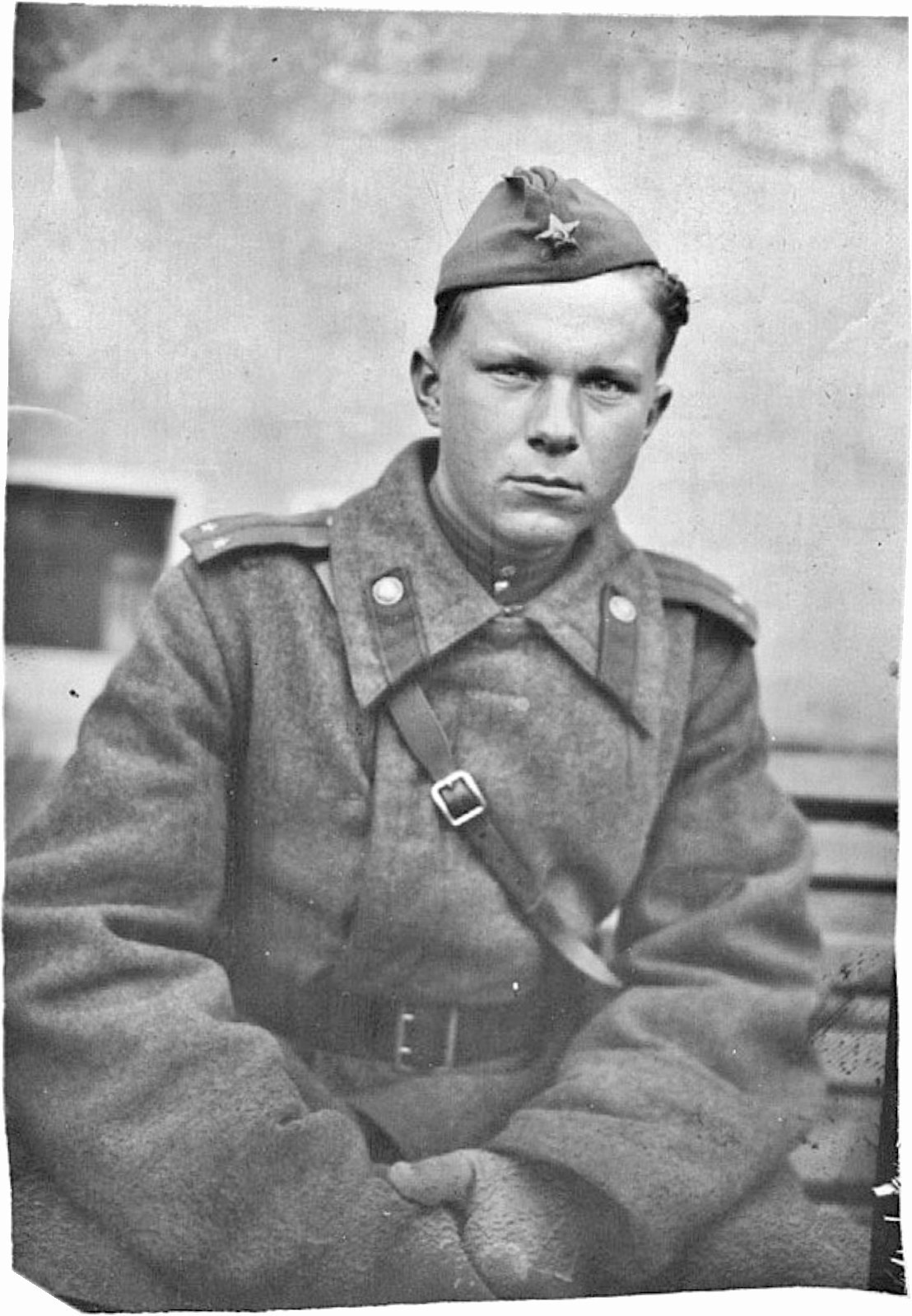
Author Vasil Bykaŭ, a recipient of the Jubilee Medal "Twenty Years of Victory in the Great Patriotic War 1941–1945"

The individuals below were all recipients of the Jubilee Medal "Twenty Years of Victory in the Great Patriotic War 1941–1945".

- Admiral of the Fleet Nikolay Kuznetsov
- Cosmonaut Colonel Yuri Gagarin
- World War 2 veteran physicist Alexander Prokhorov
- World War 2 fighter pilot, later cosmonaut, Major Pavel Belyayev
- Rear Admiral Vladimir Konovalov
- Marshal of the Soviet Union Vasily Sokolovsky
- Marshal of the Soviet Union Kirill Meretskov
- Marshal of the Soviet Union Rodion Malinovsky
- World War 2 veteran and author Vasil Bykaŭ
- Admiral Lev Vladimirsky
- Army General Kuzma Galitsky
- Army General Yakov Kreizer
- General Michał Rola-Żymierski (Poland)
- Major General Yordan Milanov (Bulgaria)
- General of the Army Abdul Haris Nasution (Indonesia)

Nikita Khrushchev mentioned that one of the reasons he wrote his autobiography, Khrushchev Remembers is that he felt deeply hurt at not being awarded this medal. As a general in the war he was eligible, but as a deposed leader he was ignored.

== See also ==
- Great Patriotic War
- Orders, decorations, and medals of the Soviet Union
- Badges and Decorations of the Soviet Union
