= Medal "For the Restoration of the Donbas Coal Mines" =

Soviet Union civilian award

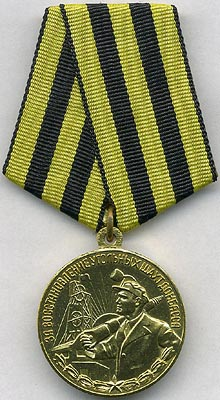
- Medal "For the Restoration of the Donbas Coal Mines" (obverse)
- Type: Civilian medal
- Awarded for: Outstanding work and achievements in the Donbas coal mines recovery
- Presented by: USSR
- Eligibility: Soviet citizens
- Status: No longer awarded
- Established: September 10, 1947

Highlights
- Total: 46,350
- Ribbon of the Medal "For the Restoration of the Donbas Coal Mines"

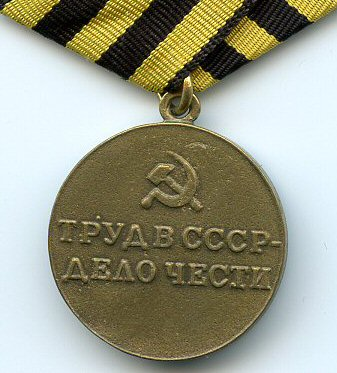
Reverse of the Medal "For the Restoration of the Donbas Coal Mines"

The Medal "For the Restoration of the Donbas Coal Mines" (Russian: Медаль «За восстановление угольных шахт Донбасса»; Ukrainian: Медаль «За відбудову вугільних шахт Донбасу», romanized: Medal «Za vidbudovu vuhilnykh shakht Donbasu») was a civilian state award of the Soviet Union established on September 10, 1947, by Decree of the Presidium of the Supreme Soviet of the USSR to recognise personal achievements by participants in the recovery of the coal mines of the Donets Basin. The medal's statute was amended on July 18, 1980, by decree of the Presidium of the Supreme Soviet of the USSR No. 2523-X.

== Medal statute ==
The Medal "For the Restoration of the Donbas Coal Mines" was awarded to workers, clerks, engineering and business professionals, for outstanding work, high production performance and achievements in the recovery of the Donbas coal mines.

Recommendations for award of the Medal "For the Restoration of the Donbas Coal Mines" was made by business leaders, party and trade union organizations. Lists of potential recipients were reviewed on behalf of the Presidium of the Supreme Soviet of the USSR by the Ministry of the Coal Industry of the USSR, the Ministry of Construction of the USSR or the Ministry of Chemical and Petroleum Industries of the western areas.

Award of the Medal "For the Restoration of the Donbas Coal Mines" was made on behalf of the Presidium of the Supreme Soviet of regional executive committees of Soviets in the communities of the award recipients. The medal was to be worn with honour, to serve as an example of high awareness and observance of labour discipline and integrity in the performance of public duties.

The Medal "For the Restoration of the Donbas Coal Mines" was worn on the left side of the chest and when in the presence of other medals of the Soviet Union, located immediately after the Medal "For the Restoration of the Black Metallurgy Enterprises of the South". When worn in the presence of Orders or medals of the Russian Federation, the latter have precedence.

== Medal description ==
The Medal "For the Restoration of the Donbas Coal Mines" was a 32 mm in diameter circular brass medal. On its obverse, in the left half, the relief image of a restored mine, a flag waving atop the tower; on the right side, the relief image of a helmeted miner facing left carrying a jackhammer on his right shoulder; in the background at center, the Sun with rays going all the way to the top of the medal; along the upper circumference, the relief inscription "For the Restoration of the Donbas Coal Mines" (Russian: «За восстановление угольных шахт Донбасса»); along the lower circumference, the relief image of a five pointed star over a laurel wreath. On the reverse, the relief image of the hammer and sickle over the inscription on two lines in prominent letters "LABOUR IN THE USSR - A MATTER OF HONOUR" (Russian: «ТРУД В СССР — ДЕЛО ЧЕСТИ»).

The Medal "For the Restoration of the Donbas Coal Mines" was secured by a ring through the medal suspension loop to a standard Soviet pentagonal mount covered by an overlapping 24 mm silk moiré ribbon with 0,5 mm black edge stripes and three 5 mm wide gold stripes separated by two 4 mm wide black stripes.

== Recipients (partial list) ==
The individuals below were recipients of the Medal "For the Restoration of the Donbas Coal Mines".

- Aleksander Aleksandrovich Skochinsky
- Aleksei Andreevich Naugolnykh
- Ivan Vladimirovich Bobrov

== See also ==
- Awards and decorations of the Soviet Union
