= Valentina Dimitrieva =

Russian politician

- Валентина Дмитриева
- Born: Valentina Dmitrievna Dimitrieva; 16/25 September 1937; Askhva, Kanashsky District, Chuvash ASSR, Russian SFSR
- Died: 18 February 2019 (aged 81); Askhva, Kanashsky District, Chuvashia, Russia
- Occupation: Farm worker
- Years active: 1952–1993
- Children: 1
- Awards: Medal "For Labour Valour"; Order of the Red Banner of Labour; Hero of Socialist Labour; Order of Lenin "Hammer and Sickle" gold medal Medal "For Transforming the Non-Black Earth of the RSFSR"

Valentina Dmitrievna Dimitrieva (Russian: Валентина Дмитриевна Дмитриева; 16/25 September 1937 – 18 February 2019) was a Soviet Russian farm worker, production leader and politician who worked at the Motor Bolishebikshih collective farm from 1952 until her retirement in 1993 and was an elected deputy of the Congress of People's Deputies of the Soviet Union from the All-Union Organization of War and Labour Veterans between 1989 and 1991. She was one worker who began mechanisation of the farm she worked at to increase performance and raised productivity of the cows in her group by more than one-third in the early 1970s. Dimitrieva was decorated with the Medal "For Labour Valour"; the Order of the Red Banner of Labour; the Hero of Socialist Labour with the Order of Lenin and the "Hammer and Sickle" gold medal and the Medal "For Transforming the Non-Black Earth of the RSFSR".

== Biography ==
Between 16 and 25 September 1937, Dimitrieva was born in the village of Askhva, Kanashsky District, Chuvash Autonomous Soviet Socialist Republic (today Chuvashia). as a Chuvash national into a peasant family. Following her graduating from the seventh grade of the Bol'shebikshikhskaya Sosh Im. Shurika, which meant she had not completed her secondary education, she began working as a collective farmer on the Red Flame collective farm in Kanash. In 1953, Dimitrieva relocated to the Ashvin field-breeding brigade and worked as an ordinary collective farmer, groom, calf. During a movement to unite the collective farms in the late 1950s, she was attached to work at the Motor Bolishebikshih collective farm, Kanashsky District, Chuvash ASSR in a group of 90 people in which she worked as a calf.

Dimitrieva began working as a milkmaid in 1963 following her taking on a greater amount of obligations to catch up to the increase the yield of milk of livestock breeders working on the Karmameev farm. She was one of the workers who brought up mechanisation of the farm to increase performance, such as the green conveyor system, the milking of cows, the camping of livestock in the summer, fodder yeast. Dmitrieva extracted 300 kilograms (660 lb) of milk from each of the farm's cow per year from 1964, overtaking the milkmaids from Karmamey. She began and organised an All-Union competition with the livestock breeders of the Peremoga collective farm in Ukraine's Kherson Oblast in the early 1970s and demanded the board of her farm's collective to mechanise its equipment, increasing the productivity of the cows in her group by more than one-third. Dimitrieva retired in 1993.

She was a member of the Communist Party of the Soviet Union. Dimitrieva was a delegate of the 6th World Festival of Youth and Students in Moscow in 1957. From 1989 to 1991, she served as an elected deputy of the Congress of People's Deputies of the Soviet Union from the All-Union Organization of War and Labour Veterans and was a member of the All-Russian Council of War and Labour Veterans.

== Personal life ==
Dimitrieva resided in Askhva with her son and his family. She died in Askhva on 18 February 2019.

== Awards ==
On 22 March 1967, Dimitrieva was decorated with the Medal "For Labour Valour" and the Order of the Red Banner of Labour on 8 April 1971. The Presidium of the Supreme Soviet issued a decree honouring her with the title of Hero of Socialist Labour with the Order of Lenin and the "Hammer and Sickle" gold medal on 6 September 1973 "for the great successes achieved in the All-Union Socialist Competition, and the labor prowess shown in fulfilling the obligations assumed to increase the production and procurement of livestock products in the winter period of 1972–1973." Dimitrieva received the title of Honored Worker of Agriculture of the Chuvash ASSR in 1981 and was issued a Labour Veteran certificate in 1995. She was named an Honorary Citizen of the Kanash District in 2016. Dimitrieva was also a recipient of the Medal "For Transforming the Non-Black Earth of the RSFSR".
