= Iraida Vertiprakhova =

Russian pilot

Iraida Fyodorovna Vertiprakhova (Russian: Ираида Фёдоровна Вертипрахова; 23 October 1931 – 28 August 2006) was the first woman to serve as pilot in command of an Il-62 and the only woman awarded the title Honoured Pilot of the USSR.
