= Honoured Blood Donor of the USSR =

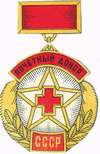
- Native name: почетньій донор CCCP
- Awarded for: Blood donation for free
- Country: Soviet Union
- Ribbon
- Established: 24 June 1944
- Final award: 1991

The Honoured Blood Donor of the USSR (Почетный донор CCCP) was an Honorary title and medals given to blood donors in the Soviet Union.

== History ==
The award was introduced on 24 June 1944. It was last awarded in 1991 before the USSR collapsed. It was given to those who gave blood for free.

== Order of delivery ==
The award was awarded to individuals who had repeatedly donated blood to save the lives of the sick and those injured in the defense of the socialist Fatherland, the protection of the State Border of the USSR and public order, natural disasters and accidents, while simultaneously working to involve the population in the ranks of donors.

Its awarding was carried out by the Executive Committee of the Union of Red Cross and Red Crescent Societies of the USSR, the Soviet Ministry of Health, the head of the Central Military Medical Directorate of the Soviet Ministry of Defense, the head of the Medical Directorate of the Soviet Ministry of Internal Affairs, and the head of the Military Medical Directorate of the Soviet State Security Committee. The procedure for nomination for the award was approved jointly by the Executive Committee of the Union of Red Cross and Red Crescent Societies of the USSR, the Soviet Ministry of Health and the relevant medical services of the Soviet Ministry of Defense, the Soviet Ministry of Internal Affairs, and the Soviet State Security Committee.

The award is worn on the right chest, below the USSR state awards. Along with the badge itself, the recipient is presented with a standard certificate. The badge has three grades, and the "Drop of Blood" badge was also established.

== Description ==
A golden wreath of wheat runs along the sides. In the middle is a red cross atop a white star, both outlined in gold. The text on the top, in black and atop a curved red rectangle, reads "почетньій донор" (Honorary Donor). The text on the bottom, in gold and atop a curved red rectangle, reads "СССР" (USSR). The ribbon for it is red with a gold outline.

== Number of awardees ==
Around 175,000 were given the award according to Russian sources.

== Gallery ==
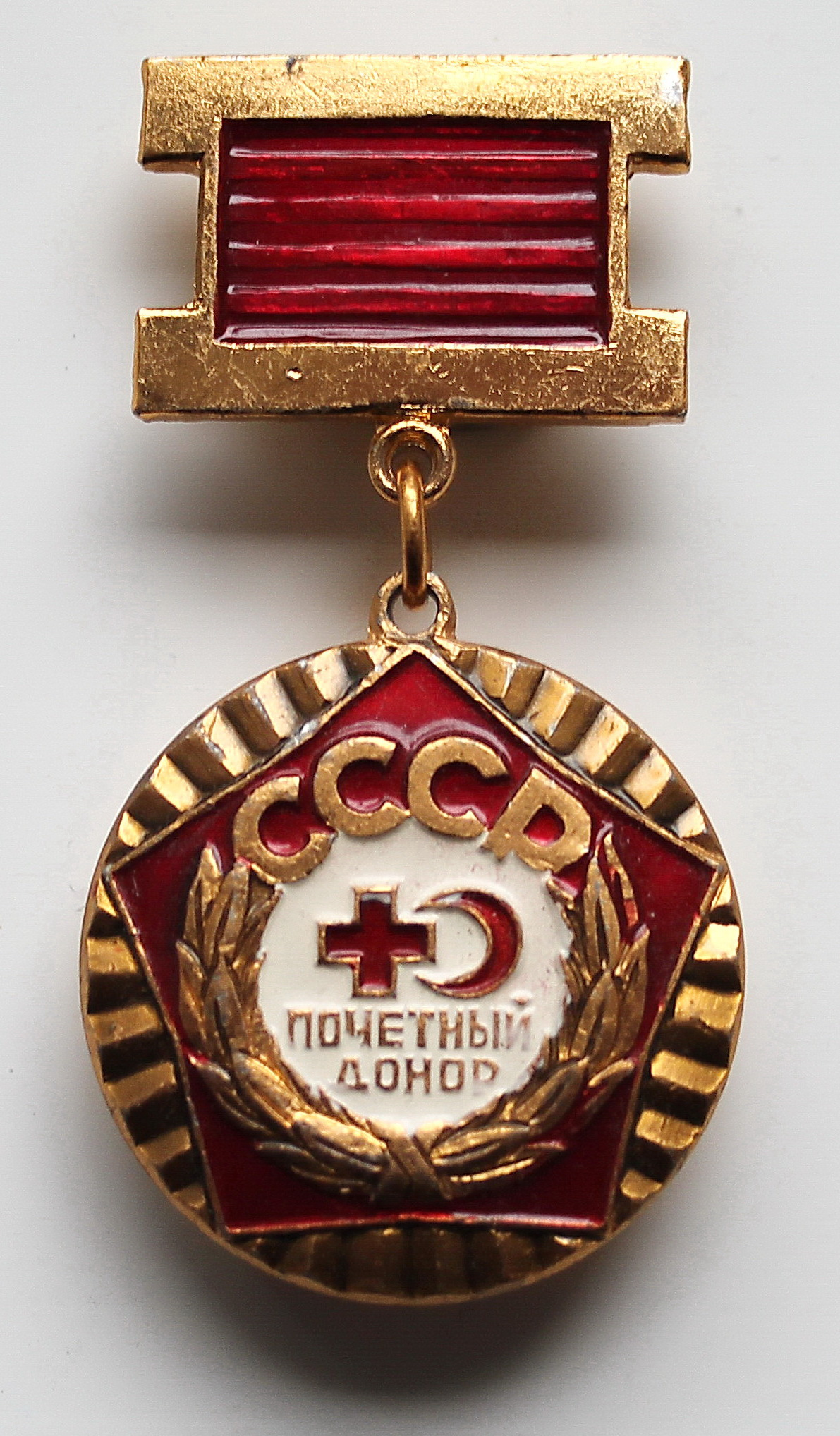
The badge from 1983 to 1991

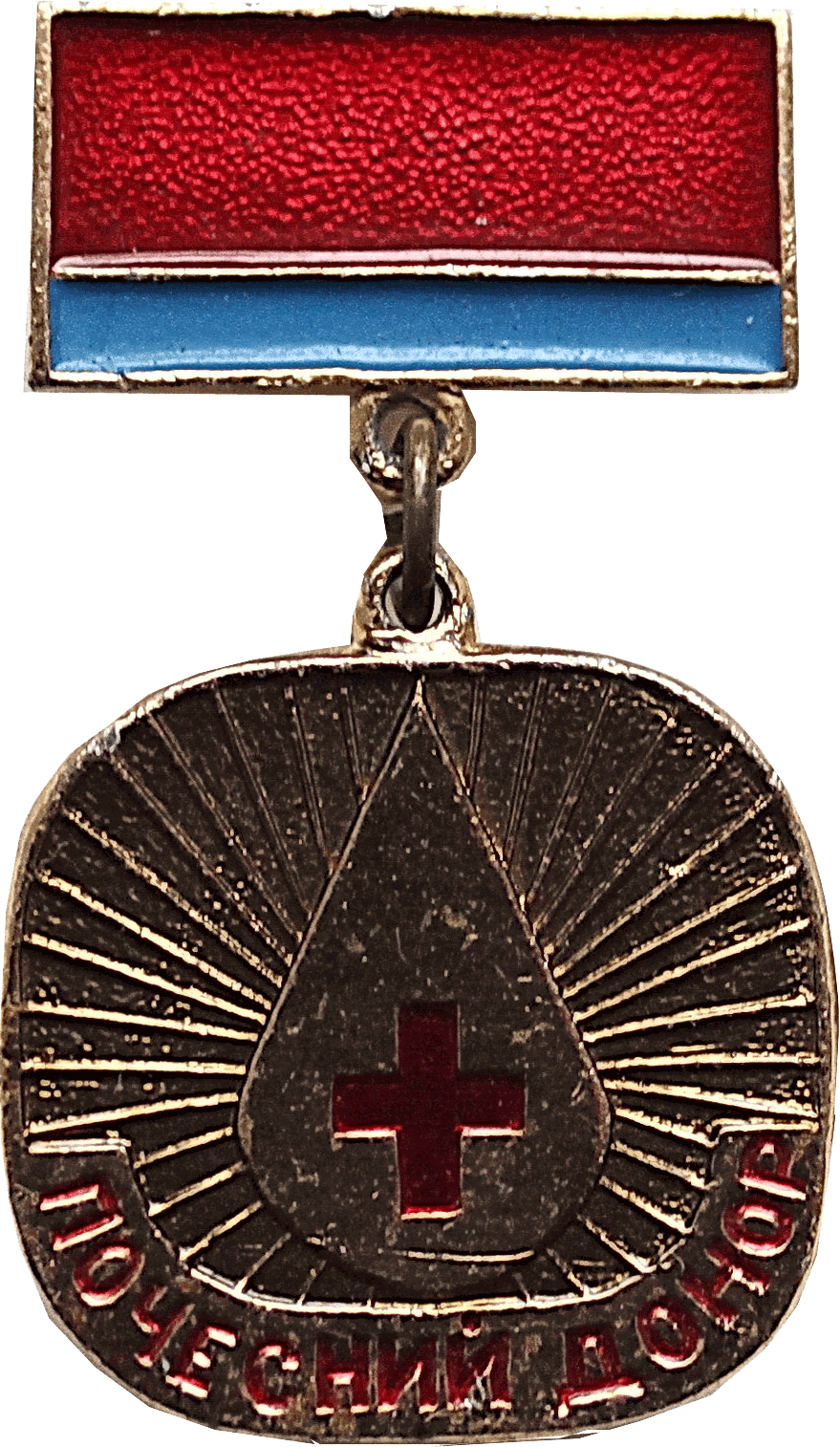
Ukrainian SSR variant

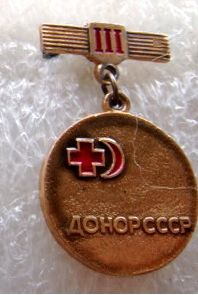
Third rank version of the badge
