= Medal "For the Restoration of the Black Metallurgy Enterprises of the South" =

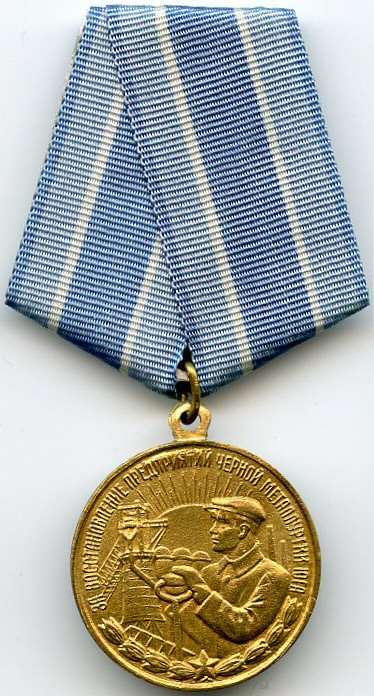
- Medal "For the Restoration of the Black Metallurgy Enterprises of the South" (obverse)
- Type: Civilian medal
- Awarded for: Outstanding work the restoration of the black metallurgy enterprises of the South
- Presented by: USSR
- Eligibility: Soviet citizens
- Status: No longer awarded
- Established: May 18, 1948

Highlights
- Total: 68,710
- Ribbon of the Medal "For the Restoration of the Black Metallurgy Enterprises of the South"

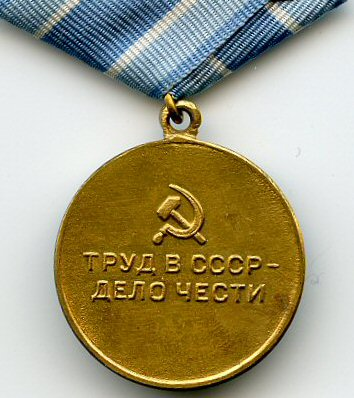
Reverse of the Medal "For the Restoration of the Black Metallurgy Enterprises of the South"

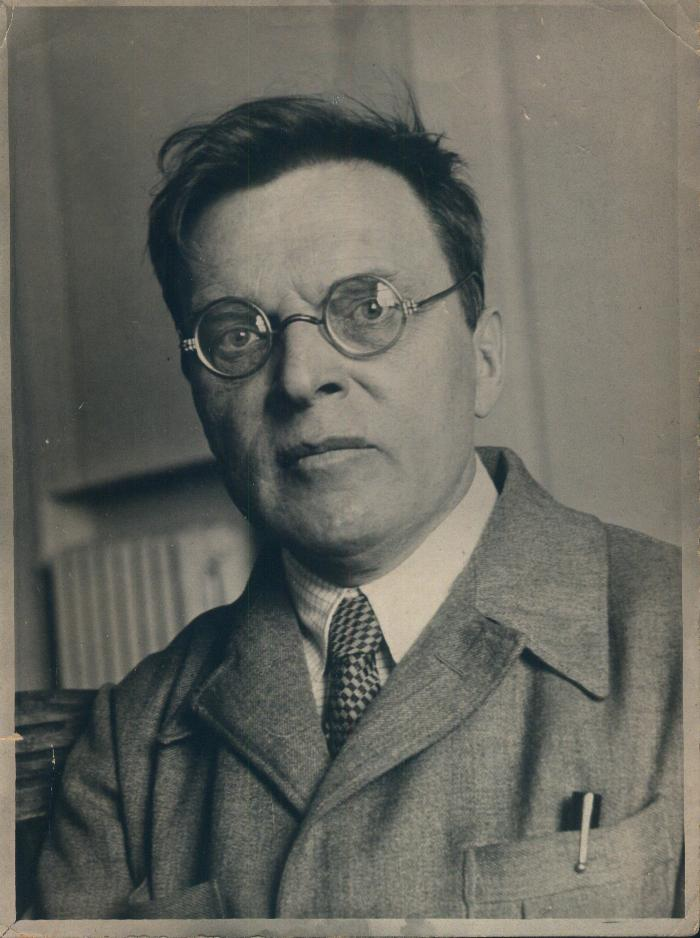
Nikolai Nikolaevich Dobrokhotov, a recipient of the Medal "For the Restoration of the Black Metallurgy Enterprises of the South"

The Medal "For the Restoration of the Black Metallurgy Enterprises of the South" (Russian: Медаль «За восстановление предприятий чёрной металлургии юга») was a civilian state award of the Soviet Union established on May 18, 1948, by Decree of the Presidium of the Supreme Soviet of the USSR to recognise personal achievements in the restoration of the Black Metallurgic Enterprises of the Soviet Union which were destroyed during the Great Patriotic War. Thirteen blast furnaces, forty-nine open hearth furnaces, twenty-nine finishing mills and sixty-eight coke-oven batteries were restored to effective or outstanding production rates. The medal's statute was amended on July 18, 1980, by decree of the Presidium of the Supreme Soviet of the USSR No. 2523-X.

== Medal statute ==
The Medal "For the Restoration of the Black Metallurgy Enterprises of the South" was awarded to workers, clerks, engineering and business professionals for their outstanding work, high production performance and achievements in the restoration of the black metallurgy industry in the south.

Recommendations for award of the Medal "For the Restoration of the Black Metallurgy Enterprises of the South" was made by business leaders, party and trade union organizations. Lists of potential recipients were reviewed on behalf of the Presidium of the Supreme Soviet of the USSR by the Ministry of Metallurgy of the USSR and the Ministry of Construction of Heavy Industry of the USSR. Award of the Medal "For the Restoration of the Black Metallurgy Enterprises of the South" was made on behalf of the Presidium of the Supreme Soviet of regional executive committees of Soviets in the communities of the award recipients. The medal was to be worn with honour, to serve as an example of high awareness and observance of labour discipline and integrity in the performance of public duties.

The Medal "For the Restoration of the Black Metallurgy Enterprises of the South" was worn on the left side of the chest and when in the presence of other medals of the Soviet Union, located immediately after the Medal "For Strengthening Military Cooperation". When worn in the presence of Orders or medals of the Russian Federation, the latter have precedence.

== Medal description ==
The Medal "For the Restoration of the Black Metallurgy Enterprises of the South" was a 32 mm in diameter circular brass medal. On the obverse on the left side, the relief image of a rebuilt blast furnace, at right, a worker with a tool for punching tapholes, in the background at center, the rising Sun with rays going up. Along the medal side and upper circumference, the relief inscription "For the restoration of the black metallurgy enterprises of the South" (Russian: «За восстановление предприятий чёрной металлургии юга»), at the bottom, the relief image of a five pointed star over a laurel wreath. On the reverse, the relief image of the hammer and sickle over the inscription on two lines in prominent letters "LABOUR IN THE USSR - A MATTER OF HONOUR" (Russian: «ТРУД В СССР — ДЕЛО ЧЕСТИ»).

The Medal "For the Restoration of the Black Metallurgy Enterprises of the South" was secured by a ring through the medal suspension loop to a standard Soviet pentagonal mount covered by an overlapping 24 mm silk moiré ribbon. The ribbon had an 8 mm wide central blue stripe bordered by 1 mm wide white stripes themselves bordered by 5 mm wide light blue stripes, 2 mm wide blue edge stripes completed it.

== Recipients (partial list) ==
The individuals below were recipients of the Medal "For the Restoration of the Black Metallurgy Enterprises of the South".

- General Secretary of the Communist Party of the Soviet Union Leonid Ilyich Brezhnev
- Scientist and metallurgist Nikolay Nikolayevich Dobrokhotov
- Professor Georgy Mikhailovich Kayapov
- Eminent Soviet metallurgist Jacob Veniaminovich Dashevsky

== See also ==
- Awards and decorations of the Soviet Union
