= Medal "For Transforming the Non-Black Earth of the RSFSR" =

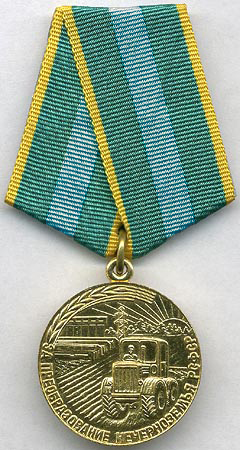
- Medal "For Transforming the Non-Black Earth of the RSFSR" (obverse)
- Type: Civilian medal
- Awarded for: Three years of dedicated work in developing Soviet agriculture
- Presented by: USSR
- Eligibility: Soviet citizens
- Status: No longer awarded
- Established: September 30, 1977

Highlights
- Total: ~25,000
- Ribbon of the Medal "For Transforming the Non-Black Earth of the RSFSR"

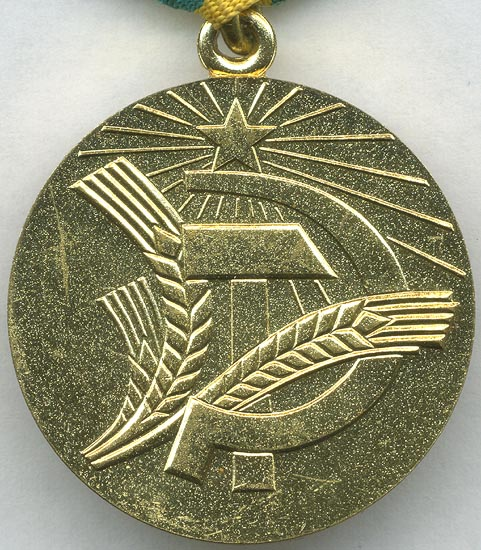
Reverse of the Medal "For Transforming the Non-Black Earth of the RSFSR"

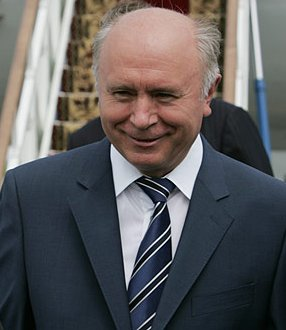
Nikolay Merkushkin, first head of the Republic of Mordovia and a recipient of the Medal "For Transforming the Non-Black Earth of the RSFSR"

The Medal "For Transforming the Non-Black Earth of the RSFSR" (Russian: Медаль «За преобразование Нечерноземья РСФСР») was a civilian award of the Soviet Union established on September 30, 1977 by Decree of the Presidium of the Supreme Soviet of the USSR to recognise three years of dedicated work in developing Soviet agriculture in the non-black earth regions of the Russian Soviet Federative Socialist Republic. The medal's statute was amended on July 18, 1980 by decree of the Presidium of the Supreme Soviet of the USSR № 2523-X.

== Medal statute ==
The Medal "For Transforming the Non-Black Earth of the RSFSR" was awarded to workers, farmers and employees who made an impact on the work of implementation of the long-term program for the development for agriculture of the non-black earth zone of the Russian Soviet Federative Socialist Republic, and who worked as a rule, for not less than three years in this field and that were located on state or collective farms, or worked in businesses, organizations or institutions whose activities were directly related to the transformation of the non-black earth.

Recommendations for award of the Medal "For Transforming the Non-Black Earth of the RSFSR" were made by the administrative heads of enterprises, institutions, organizations, boards of collective farms, party, trade union or Komsomol organizations labour groups, and sent to the executive committee of the District or City Council of People's Deputies for review. The names of the recipients was then forwarded to the executive committee of the Regional Soviet of People's Deputies of the Supreme Soviet of the autonomous republic, which, after final consideration, awarded the medal on behalf of the Presidium of the Supreme Soviet of the RSFSR in the communities of the recipients.

The Medal "For Transforming the Non-Black Earth of the RSFSR" was worn on the left side of the chest and in the presence of other medals of the USSR, immediately after the Medal "For Construction of the Baikal-Amur Railway". If worn in the presence of awards of the Russian Federation, the latter have precedence.

Each medal came with an attestation of award, this attestation came in the form of a small 8 cm by 11 cm cardboard booklet bearing the award's name, the recipient's particulars and an official stamp and signature on the inside.

== Medal description ==
The Medal "For Transforming the Non-Black Earth of the RSFSR" was a 32 mm in diameter circular medal struck from tombac. On the obverse, in the right half, the relief image of a tractor pulling a plough through a field below a rising Sun over a distant tree line; at left the relief images of barns, grain elevators and power transmission towers; along the medal's lower circumference, the relief inscription "For transforming the Non-Black Earth of the RSFSR" (Russian: «За преобразование Нечерноземья РСФСР»), along the upper left circumference, a panicle of wheat; the obverse had a raised rim. On the reverse, at center, the relief image of the hammer and sickle with wheat spikes below a relief five pointed star emitting rays.

The Medal "For Transforming the Non-Black Earth of the RSFSR" was secured to a standard Soviet pentagonal mount by a ring through the medal suspension loop. The mount was covered by a 24 mm wide overlapping green silk moiré ribbon with 2 mm yellow edge stripes and a 6 mm central blue stripe.

== Recipients (partial list) ==
The individuals below were recipients of the Medal "For Transforming the Non-Black Earth of the RSFSR":

- 1st Head of the Republic of Mordovia Nikolay Ivanovich Merkushkin
- Former head of the Bryansk Region Vladimir Aleksandrovich Barabanov
- Cherevkovsky farm director Yuri Arsent'evich Bareshkin
- Farm worker Valentina Dimitrieva
- Politician and businessman Petr Anatol'evich Karpov
- Doctor Leonid Vladimirovich Ponomarev
- Vladimir Grigor'evich Matrosov
- Aleksandr Vasil'evich Gruzdev
- Nikolai Dmitrievich Belousov
- Viktor Alekseevich Vlasov
- Aleksandr Nikolaevich Surin

== See also ==
- Orders, decorations, and medals of the Soviet Union
