= Order of Labour Glory =

Soviet civilian award

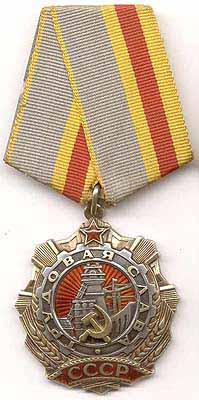
- Order of Labour Glory, 1st class
- Type: Three-grade order
- Awarded for: accomplishments in labour, the civil service, literature, the arts and sciences
- Presented by: the Soviet Union
- Eligibility: Soviet citizens and institutions including factories
- Status: No longer awarded
- Established: January 18, 1974
- First award: August 9, 1974
- Final award: December 21, 1991

Highlights
- Total: 1st class – 983; 2nd class – 41,218; 3rd class – 611,242
- Ribbon of the Order of Labour Glory

Precedence
- Next (higher): Order of the Badge of Honour
- Related: Order of Glory

The Order of Labour Glory (Russian: Орден Трудовой Славы) was a Soviet civilian award created on 18 January 1974 by the decision of the Presidium of Supreme Soviet of the USSR. Closely modelled on the Order of Glory, it was meant to be its civilian counterpart, awarded for exceptional labour achievements. In the same way as the Order of Glory, it was divided in three classes (the highest being the 1st class), with a person initially received the third degree, and subsequently promoted to higher degrees for further achievements. It also gave a certain number of material benefits to their owners, such as pension raises or free travel in city transports.

In 1991, the following number of awards were made:

- 1st class – 983
- 2nd class – 41,218
- 3rd class – 611,242

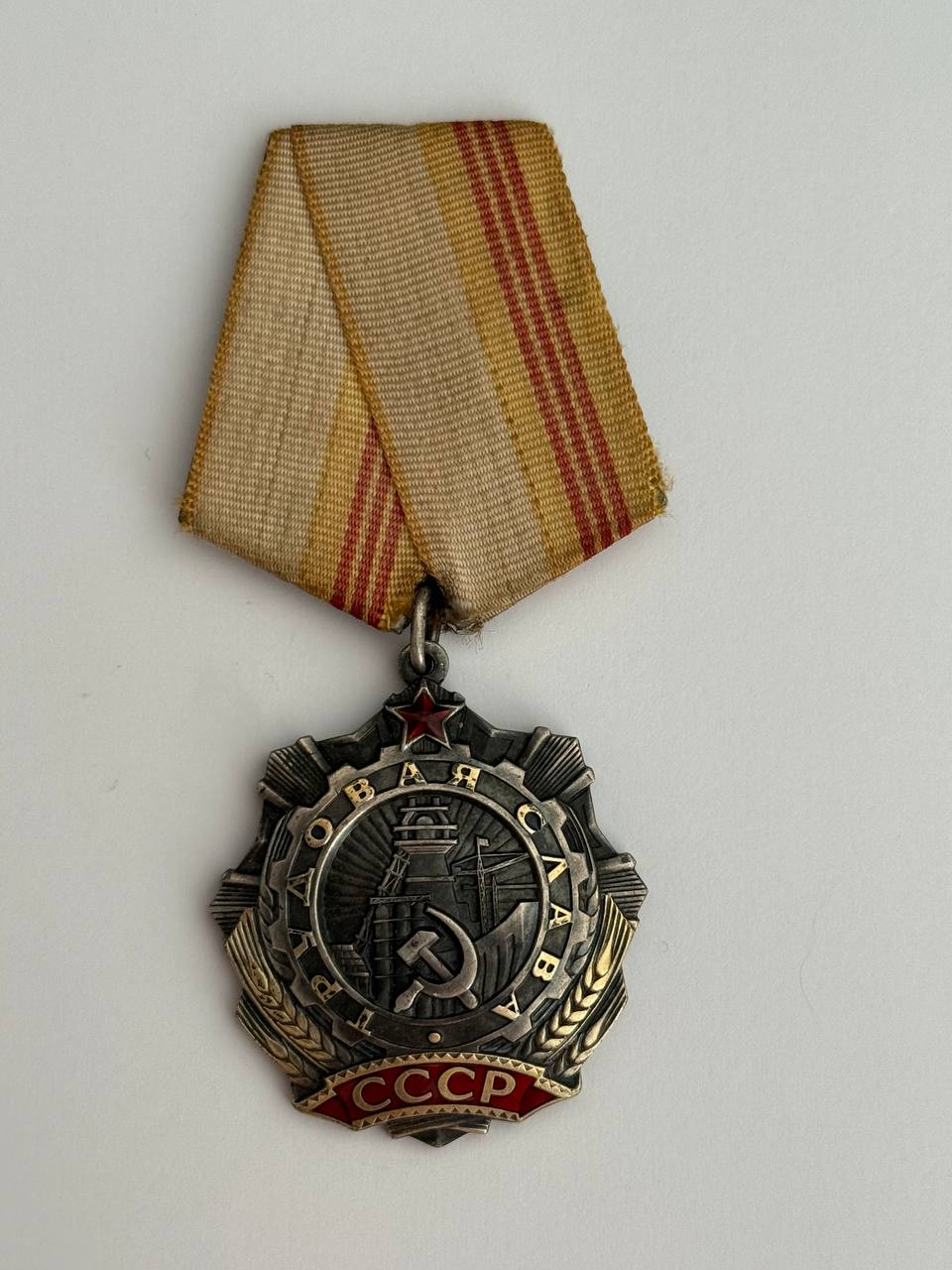
Order Of Labour Glory, 3st class averse

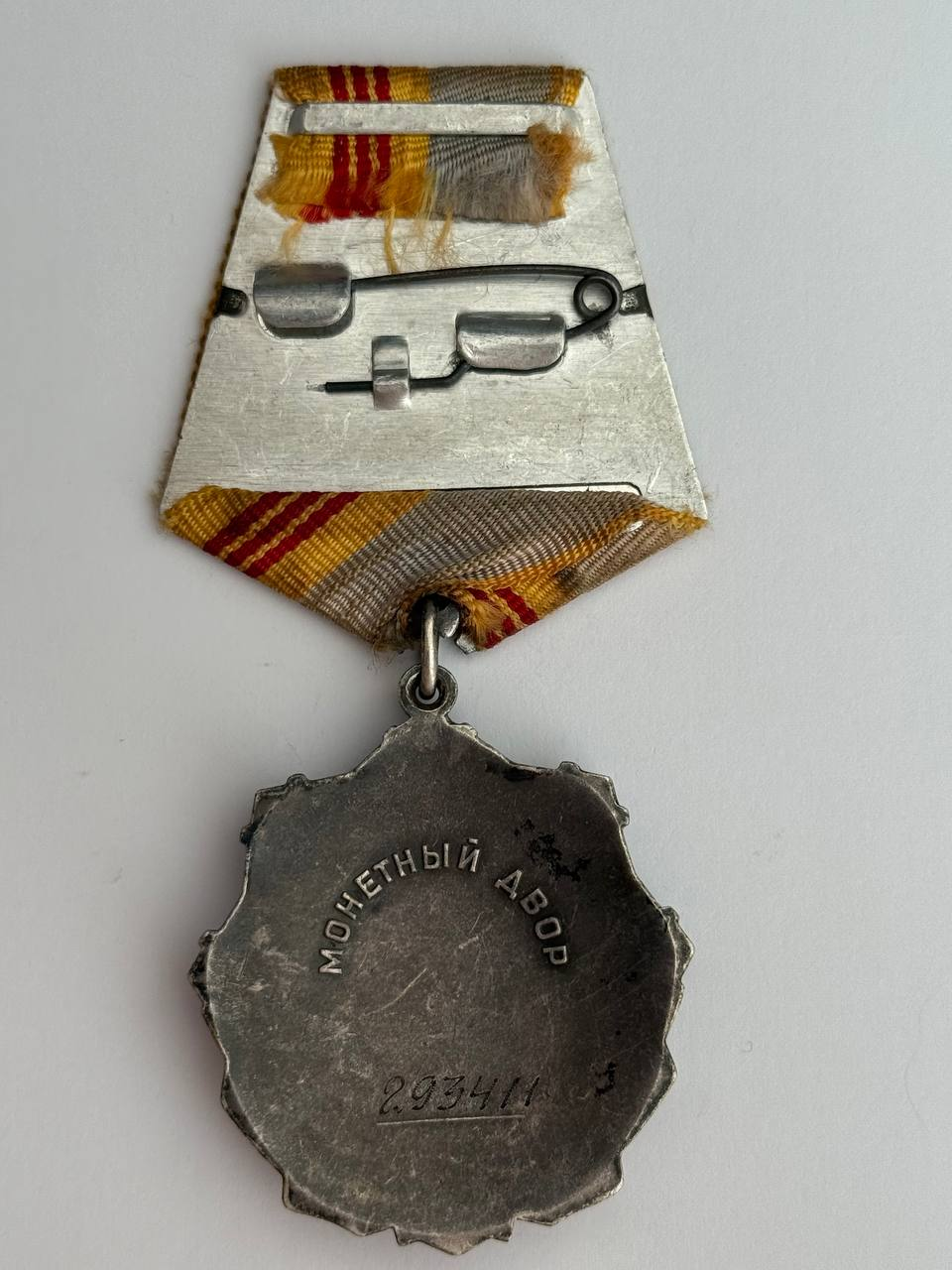
Order Of Labour Glory, 3st class reverse

== Medals and ribbons ==
Ribbons
First Class	Second Class	Third Class
