= Badges and decorations of the Soviet Union =

This article is a list of Badges and decorations of the Soviet Union. They were awarded primarily for military service, but also for sports, graduation and community participation. The badges were not only given to award service or achievement, but to inspire loyalty and patriotism to the Soviet regime.

== "Flag" badges ==
Badge And Ribbon	Name (English/Russian/Translit)	Creation Date	Description
	Delegate of the Supreme Soviet of the USSR		Awarded to Delegates of the Supreme Soviet of the USSR.

== All-Union Civilian badges ==
Badge And Ribbon	Name (English/Russian/Translit)	Creation Date	Description
	Winner of the Socialist Competition		Awarded for winning the Socialist competition.
	Blood Donor (1st Class); Донор СССР (первой степени)		For donating blood.
	Blood Donor (2nd Class); Донор СССР (второй степени)		For donating blood.
	Blood Donor (3rd Class); Донор СССР (третьей степени)		For donating blood.

== All-Union sport decorations ==
Badge And Ribbon	Name (English/Russian/Translit)	Creation Date	Description
	Champion of the USSR (1st class); Чемпион СССР (первой степени)		Awarded to champions of the Soviet Union
	Champion of the USSR (2nd class); Чемпион СССР (второй степени)		Awarded to champions of the Soviet Union
	Champion of the USSR (3rd class); Чемпион СССР (третьей степени)		Awarded to champions of the Soviet Union
	Record-breaker of the USSR; Рекордсмен СССР		Awarded to record-breakers of the Soviet Union
	For the best ascension За лучшее восхождение		Awarded for the best ascension

== Military badges ==
Badge And Ribbon	Name (English/Russian/Translit)	Creation Date	Description
	Excellence in the Workers' and Peasants' Red Army		Issued to Red Army personnel for excellence before the force was renamed after the Second World War.
	10th Anniversary Of The O.G.P.U.	1927	Issued to members of the Soviet Political Police.
	Participant Of The Khasan Battle 1938	5 June 1939	Issued to service personnel who took part in the Battle of Lake Khasan against Japanese forces.
	Badge For Bravery And Determination In The Great Patriotic War	1970	Awarded to Veterans of the Second World War on the event of the 25th Anniversary of Victory.
	Excellent Propagandist Of The M.V.D.		Awarded to M.V.D. personnel for excellent work in propaganda promoting the works of the M.V.D. using various art forms and media.
	Excellence In The D.O.S.A.A.F.		Issued to D.O.S.A.A.F. personnel for excellence in supporting the armed forces.
	50th Anniversary Of The D.O.S.A.A.F.		
	Badge for "Long Cruise" (surface ships); Знак "за дальний поход"	22 May 1961 original variant (1961–1976)	Awarded to the most distinguished, highly disciplined military and civilian personnel of the Soviet Navy who participated in successful long-range cruises on vessels of the Navy.
	Badge for "Long Cruise" (surface ships); Знак "за дальний поход"	22 May 1961; 2nd variant (1976–1987)	Awarded to the most distinguished, highly disciplined military and civilian personnel of the Soviet Navy who participated in successful long-range cruises on vessels of the Navy.
	Badge for "Long Cruise" (submarines); Знак "за дальний поход"	22 May 1961 original variant (1961–1976)	Awarded to the most distinguished, highly disciplined military and civilian personnel of the Soviet Navy who participated in successful long-range cruises on vessels of the Navy.
	Badge for "Long Cruise" (submarines); Знак "за дальний поход"	22 May 1961; 2nd variant (1976–1987)	Awarded to the most distinguished, highly disciplined military and civilian personnel of the Soviet Navy who participated in successful long-range cruises on vessels of the Navy.
	Badge "Army Air Defense Forces"; Знак "Войска ПВО страны"	31 March 1975	Awarded to members of the Soviet Army Air Defense Forces for exemplary performance in military duties on air defense alert crews over a period of 5 years. Commanders of air defense units that rated as "excellent" could also be awarded the badge.
	Breast badge of Internal Troops "For Distinction in Service" (1st class); ВВМВД Нагрудный знак "За отличие в службе" I степени	1971	Awarded to soldiers of the Interior Ministry (BBMVD) of the USSR for initiative, diligence and distinction displayed in the discharge of official duties.
	Breast badge of Internal Troops "For Distinction in Service" (2nd class); ВВМВД Нагрудный знак "За отличие в службе" II степени	1971	Awarded to soldiers of the Interior Ministry (BBMVD) of the USSR for initiative, diligence and distinction displayed in the discharge of official duties.
	Breast badge for "Excellent Border Troop" (1st class); Нагрудный знак "Отличник погранвойск" I степени	8 April 1969	Awarded to soldiers, sailors, sergeants and petty officers of KGB Border Troops, or to other soldiers urgently enlisted in assisting the Border Troops, for exemplary performance of duties in the protection of the state border of the USSR, skillful actions to apprehend violators of the border, for displaying courage, perseverance, endurance, excellent performance in combat and political training, and for military discipline.
	Breast badge for "Excellent Border Troop" (2nd class); Нагрудный знак "Отличник погранвойск" II степени	8 April 1969	Awarded to soldiers, sailors, sergeants and petty officers of KGB Border Troops, or to other soldiers urgently enlisted in assisting the Border Troops, for exemplary performance of duties in the protection of the state border of the USSR, skillful actions to apprehend violators of the border, for displaying courage, perseverance, endurance, excellent performance in combat and political training, and for military discipline.

=== Graduate badges ===
Badge And Ribbon	Name (English/Russian/Translit)	Creation Date	Description
			Issued to graduates of the Soviet Union's General Staff College until 1992
			Issued to graduates of one of the Soviet Union's staff colleges until 1992
			Issued to graduates of the Soviet Union's Staff College of Armored and Motorized Troops
			Issued to graduates of one of the Soviet Union's military education facilities, officers high schools or military faculties of a civilian high school

=== Badges for Military Excellence ===
Badge And Ribbon	Name (English/Russian/Translit)	Creation Date	Description
	Excellent Artillery Personnel; Отличный артиллерист	21 May 1942	
	Excellent Shooter; Отличный стрелок	21 May 1942	
	Excellent Sniper; Снайпер	21 May 1942	
	Excellent Tank Crew Personnel; Отличный танкист	21 May 1942	
	Excellent Machinegunner; Отличный пулемётчик	21 May 1942	
	Excellent Mortar Specialist; Отличный миномётчик	21 May 1942	
	Excellent Submariner; Отличный подводник	21 May 1942	
	Excellent Torpedo Specialist; Отличный торпедист	21 May 1942	
	Excellent Railway Troop; Отличник желдорвойск	21 May 1942	
	Excellent Land Mine Specialist; Отличный минёр	19 August 1942	
	Excellent Combat Engineer; Отличный сапёр	19 August 1942	
	Excellent Medic; Отличник санитарной службы	4 October 1942	
	Excellent Reconnaissance Scout; Отличный разведчик	10 March 1943	
	Excellent Signaler; Отличный связной	3 April 1943	
	Excellent Pontoon Bridge Builder; Отличный понтонер	5 April 1943	
	Excellent Antiaircraft Gunner; Отличник ПВО	30 April 1943	
	Excellent Driver; Отличный шофёр	8 July 1943	
	Excellent Cook; Отличнрый повар	8 July 1943	
	Excellent Baker; Отличнрый пекарь	8 July 1943	
	Excellent Road Builder; Отличный дорожник	8 July 1943	
	Excellent Tractor Driver; Отличный тракторист	10 September 1943	
	Excellent Fire Fighter; Отличный пожарный	22 November 1944	
	Excellence In The Air Force; Отличник авиации	1950	
	Excellent in Military Construction; Отличник военного строительства	21 May 1954	Awarded to military and civilian personnel of military units and organizations of construction and quartering of troops of the Ministry of Defense of the Soviet Union, for distinction in the sus performance of official duties, for achieving high results in work, or for active participation in important construction during military operations.

== Local badges ==
Badge And Ribbon	Name (English/Russian/Translit)	Creation Date	Description
	Excellence in socialist competition in gold and platinum mining		Awarded to workers in the gold and platinum mining industries for excellent labour.

== Leninist Young Communist League Awards ==
Badge And Ribbon	Name (English/Russian/Translit)	Creation Date	Description
	For Environmental Protection; За защиту окружающей среды		Issued by the Leninist Young Communist League Of The Soviet Union.

== See also ==
- Orders, decorations, and medals of the Soviet Union
- Orders, decorations, and medals of the Russian Federation
- Awards and Emblems of the Ministry of Defence of the Russian Federation
- Awards of the Ministry for Emergency Situations of Russia
- Awards of the Ministry of Internal Affairs of Russia
- Awards of the Federal Border Service of the Russian Federation
- Honorary titles of the Russian Federation
- Orders, decorations, and medals of Belarus
