= List of October Revolution Parades in Moscow =

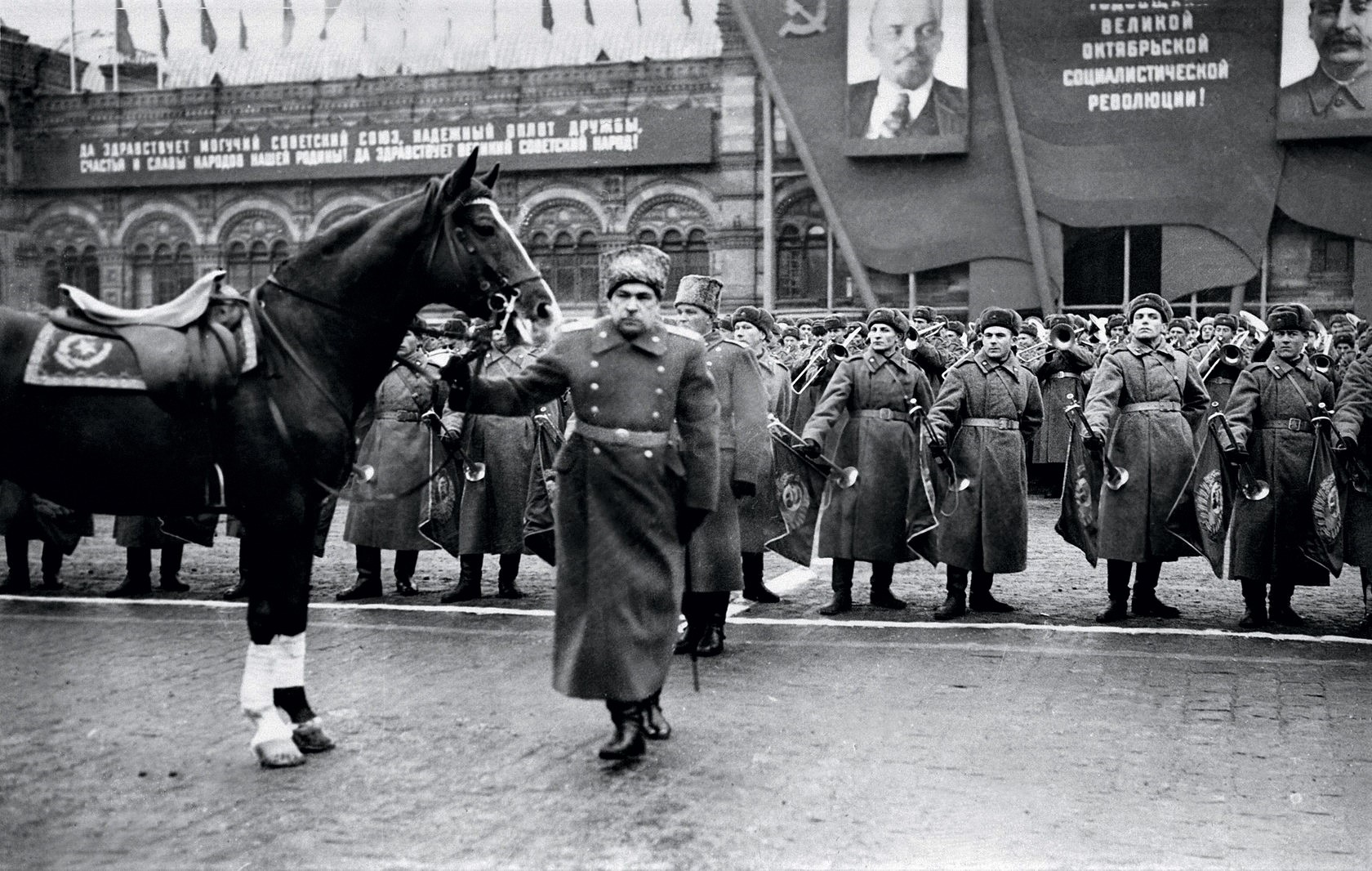
Marshal Leonid Govorov at the 30th anniversary parade in 1947.

The annual October Revolution Day Parade on 7 November (Russian: Военный Парад на 7 Ноября) on Moscow's Red Square was a military parade of the Moscow Military District of the Soviet Armed Forces that took place every year from 1919–1990 commemorating the anniversary of the 1917 October Revolution. Led by representatives from the Russian Social Democratic Labour Party (Bolsheviks), the insurrectionists overthrew the liberal Russian Provisional Government led by Alexander Kerensky, on 6–7 November 1917 (N.S., 24–25 October O.S.).

== History ==
On 1 May 1918, on International Workers' Day, the first parade of the Red Army took place on Khodynka Field. Subsequently, many military parades were traditionally held, mainly on Red Square. At first, these events were held on the anniversary of the October Revolution. On 7 November 1919, a parade was held in honor of the second anniversary of the events of 1917. Columns of cadets, infantry, cavalry, and units, as well as horse-drawn artillery took part in the procession. Starting in 1922, parades began to be held twice a year: on 1 May and 7 November. There were no parades held from 1942–1944 due to occupation of Soviet territories by the German Wehrmacht. The last May Day parade took place in 1968, and the November parade ended in 1990.

== List of parades ==
=== 1910s ===
There were military parades held in 1918 and 1919.

=== 1920s ===
There was no military parades held in 1920 and 1921. On 7 November 1922, a parade was held in honor of the fifth anniversary of the revolution, with the Chairman of the Revolutionary Military Council Leon Trotsky who inspected the parade and gave the keynote speech. In 1923, the first aerial filming of Moscow and Red Square was made and for the first time, artillery tractors participated in the parade. In 1924, the parade was opened by students of the Red Army Academy, who marched past Lenin's Mausoleum. The 1925 parade was not held due to the mourning period for Mikhail Frunze.

In 1926, The Parade Troops of The Moscow Garrison was received by Kliment Voroshilov.

In 1927, Red Square hosted the huge parade that took place on the 10th anniversary of the revolution. A consolidated regiment of sailors from the Baltic Fleet and the Black Sea Fleet, as well as the North Caucasian Cavalry Regiment, the Joint State Political Directorate, and the People's Commissariat of Railways. There were no armored cars and tanks and due to inclement weather, the flypast over Red Square was canceled. Mikhail Kalinin was that year's parade inspector, and it would prove to be the last time the inspection was done on foot.

In 1928, The Parade was hosted by Mikhail Kalinin.

In 1929, The Parade was hosted by Kliment Voroshilov. Ieronim Uborevich commanded the parade. Cars, motorcycles, mechanized artillery, armored cars, light and heavy tanks passed in front of the central tribune. Squadrons flew across the sky.

=== 1930–1940 ===
The 20th anniversary parade in 1937.

1930 would see the beginning of the wide armored columns passing through Red Square provided by the men from the then Mechanized Brigade of the Moscow Military District.

There were military parades held in 1931 and 1932.

In 1933, the newest additions to the parade were former partisans and bomber aircraft, plus the Vladimir Lenin All-Union Pioneer Organization and OSOAVIAKhIM.

In 1934, The parade was opened by students of military academies, infantry and mechanized units, pilots, signalmen, engineers, chemists, cadets of the All-Russian Central Executive Committee school, units of the Proletarian Division, Red Navy and border guards, work detachments of former Red Guards and partisans, young workers of Osoaviahim. Then there was a turn of mechanized troops and tanks. Completed the parade flight of aircraft.

In 1935, Academies and schools, units of the Moscow Proletarian Rifle Division, battalions of Moscow proletarians, and artillery passed to the sound of a military band. Squadrons of the Special Cavalry Division named after I. V. Stalin passed. Air defense equipment was widely represented at the parade - anti-aircraft machine guns and guns, searchlights and sound pickups. Armored cars, trucks with motorized infantry and artillery crews, high-speed light tanks, amphibious vehicles, medium tanks, multi-gun tanks passed. The column of heavy tanks was led by the Kirov tank. Units of the mechanized corps named after K. B. Kalinovsky showed coherence and skill. Due to bad weather, the aviation part of the parade did not take place.

1936 celebrated the nineteenth anniversary of the revolution. The parade was opened by a consolidated regiment of the commanding staff of the central departments of the People's Commissariat of Defense, then military academies and schools, a consolidated detachment of sailors, battalions of the Moscow Proletarian Rifle Division, squadrons of the Cavalry Division named after I.V. Stalin, a consolidated cart regiment, cyclists, motorcyclists, a detachment of armored cars, artillery. The procession was completed by units of the mechanized corps named after K. B. Kalinovsky and other tank units.

1937 celebrated the twentieth anniversary of the revolution. The parade was commanded by Marshal of the Soviet Union Semyon Budyonny and inspected by Marshal Kliment Voroshilov. Training aircraft from the Zhukovsky Air Force Engineering Academy flew in visual formations "USSR" and the Roman numeral "XX" in the skies of the capital. It was the first ever Revolution Day parade to be started by the cadet drummers coming from the newly established Moscow Military Music College, which opened its doors that year.

In 1938, cadets of the Felix Dzerzhinsky Artillery Academy took part in the parade for the first time.

There were military parades held in 1939.

In 1940, subdivisions of the 1st Moscow motorized rifle division passed (the soldiers of the division were armed with PPD assault rifles), squadrons of the Special Cavalry Brigade of the NPO, military sailors, border guards, NKVD troops, pilots, soldiers of air defense units, tankers (medium tanks T-28, heavy combat vehicles T-35, fast tanks BT-7). Armored cars BA-20 and BA-10 passed by.

=== 1941 ===
The Moscow parade of 1941 was significant in that it was the sole parade ever to be held during World War II (known in Russia as the Great Patriotic War). Marshal Semyon Budyonny, the commandant of the Reserve Front, was assigned by Soviet leader Joseph Stalin to become the parade inspector that year, with Colonel General Pavel Artemyev commanding the formations present. Stalin would become the first Soviet leader to directly give the keynote address in a national parade.

=== 1942–1966 ===
There were no parades hosted in 1942, 1943, 1944, and 1945, respectively. The 1945 October Revolution Day parade was held behind closed doors in selected cities, in which Moscow was excluded.

In the post-war years, the selection of parade participants was carried out according to a strict criteria, including an age requirement of a soldier that being not older than 30 years and a height that is no less than 176 cm. In 1953, the tradition of receiving parades on horseback ended, with Marshal Nikolai Bulganin being the first to complete the inspection in an open car (specifically a ZIS-110B). That same year, cadets of the Kiev Suvorov Military School in the Ukrainian Soviet Socialist Republic took part for the first time. The first ever television broadcasts of the parade began in 1955. Intercontinental ballistic missiles were displayed for the first time at the ruby jubilee parade of 1957. The practice of foreign leaders began in that year with Mao Zedong attending that year's parade as part of a state visit. In 1960, Che Guevara attended the parade that year. Among the guests at the 46th anniversary parade in 1963 was Valentina Tereshkova. The parade that year has one of the earliest records of the full parade to exist, as well as was the last parade attended by Nikita Khrushchev before he was deposed the following October. In 1964, a new ICBM was unveiled. It was also Brezhnev's first parade as leader. For the first time, at the military parade in 1966, a mobile ground missile system equipped with an intercontinental ballistic missile (the prototype of the future Topol-M) was demonstrated.

From 1965–1968, the Dzerzhinsky Division was represented by soldiers from the Urals and Siberia.

=== 1967 ===
In November 1967 Minister of Defense Marshal Andrei Grechko announced his gratitude and of the Ministry of Defence to all those who marched on Red Square in 1967 as the country marked the golden jubilee anniversary year of the Revolution and for the first time, together with the text of gratitude, they were presented with commemorative badges "Participant of the military parade". Colour television broadcasts of the parade began that year in phrases, with the Moscow parade being seen only within the capital metropolitan area.

=== 1968–1971 ===
The parade began to have a live nationwide broadcast via satellite in 1969.

=== 1972 ===
The 1972 parade was the 100th parade ever to be held, marking the golden jubilee of the foundation of the Soviet Union. The Soviet Navy at the parade was represented by the cadets of the Black Sea Higher Naval School and the Leningrad Nakhimov Naval School. Another commemorative badge was also awarded in this year. A number of naval schools also had custom made badges made in honor of their participation in the celebrations, including the Higher Naval School of Radio Electronics named after Alexander Stepanovich Popov, and the Caspian Higher Naval School named after Sergei Kirov.

=== 1973–1976 ===
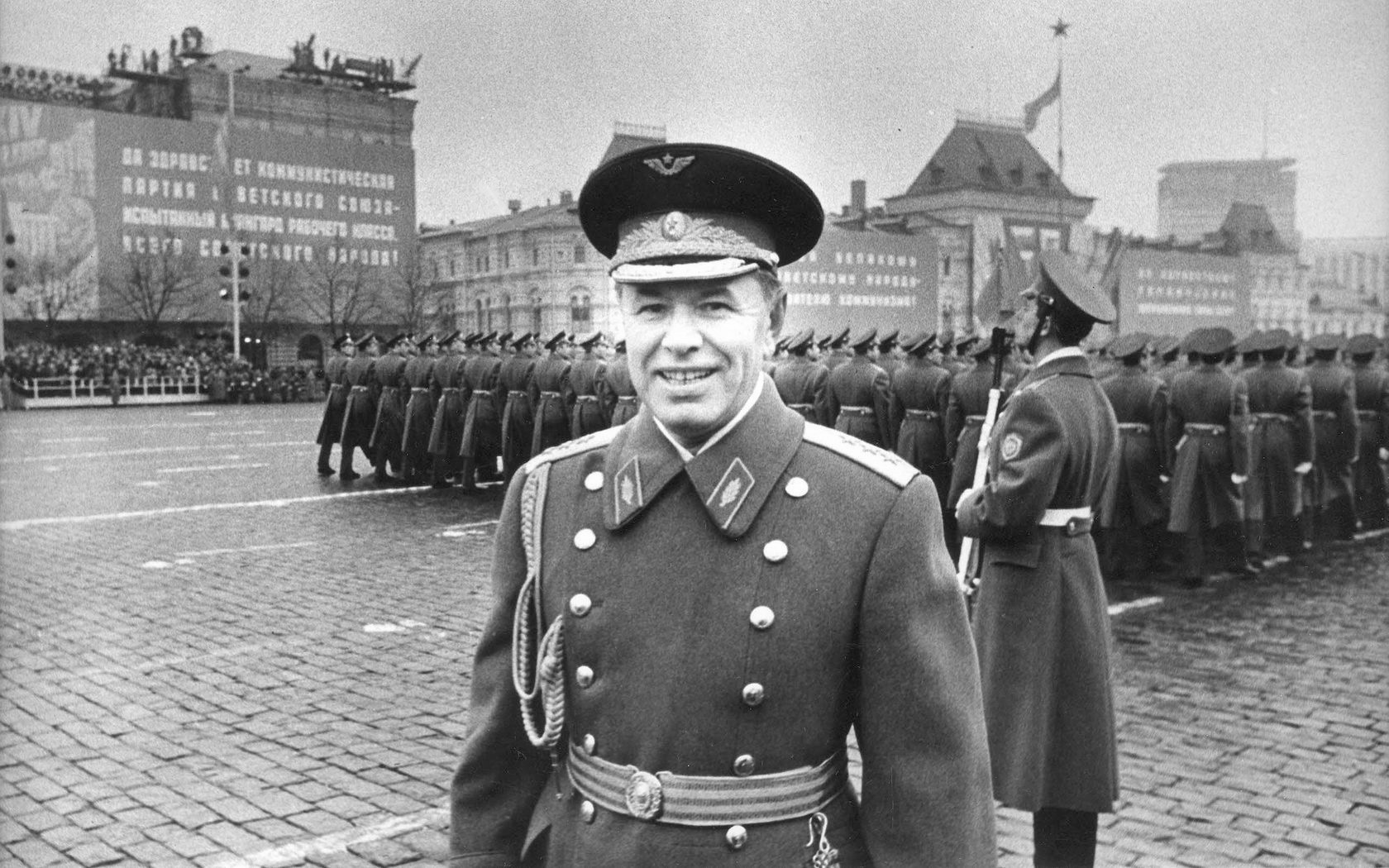
General Nikolai Skomorokhov at the 1974 parade.

The 1974 parade dedicated to the 57th anniversary was the last to feature heavy nuclear missiles such as ballistic missiles. Due to the rain that took place that day the parade of workers and athletes after the parade finale was cancelled. Although the demonstrations on Red Square were cancelled, the demonstrations on Palace Square in Leningrad continued following the parade there.

With 1975 marking the 30th anniversary of the Moscow Victory Parade of 1945, the Moscow Military Music College debuted what would be a 27-year tradition of leading the parades with its fanfare trumpeters and fifers, as well as its Turkish crescent and a pair of glockenspiels. The parade that year acted as the de facto Victory Day Parade for that jubilee year.

Although military vehicles were present in 1976, there was no display of tanks.

=== 1977 ===
The 1977 parade took place to commemorate the diamond jubilee of the October Revolution. The Soviet Communist Party General Secretary Leonid Brezhnev and Soviet Prime Minister Alexei Kosygin attended the parade, among other foreign leaders from Warsaw Pact and allied countries who decided to fly in for the celebrations. As per tradition, 14 other Soviet Cities (including Leningrad) held their parades on this day. A folding stock version of the AK-47 notably appeared in the contingent from the Airborne troops. This parade included the updated anthem of the Soviet Union for the first time. The parade saw the return of military tanks after a two-year hiatus, the highlight of which was the T-72 tank that was first publicly seen at this parade. The parade also featured a full return to the iconic armor columns and missiles in the second half of the parade.

=== 1978–1986 ===
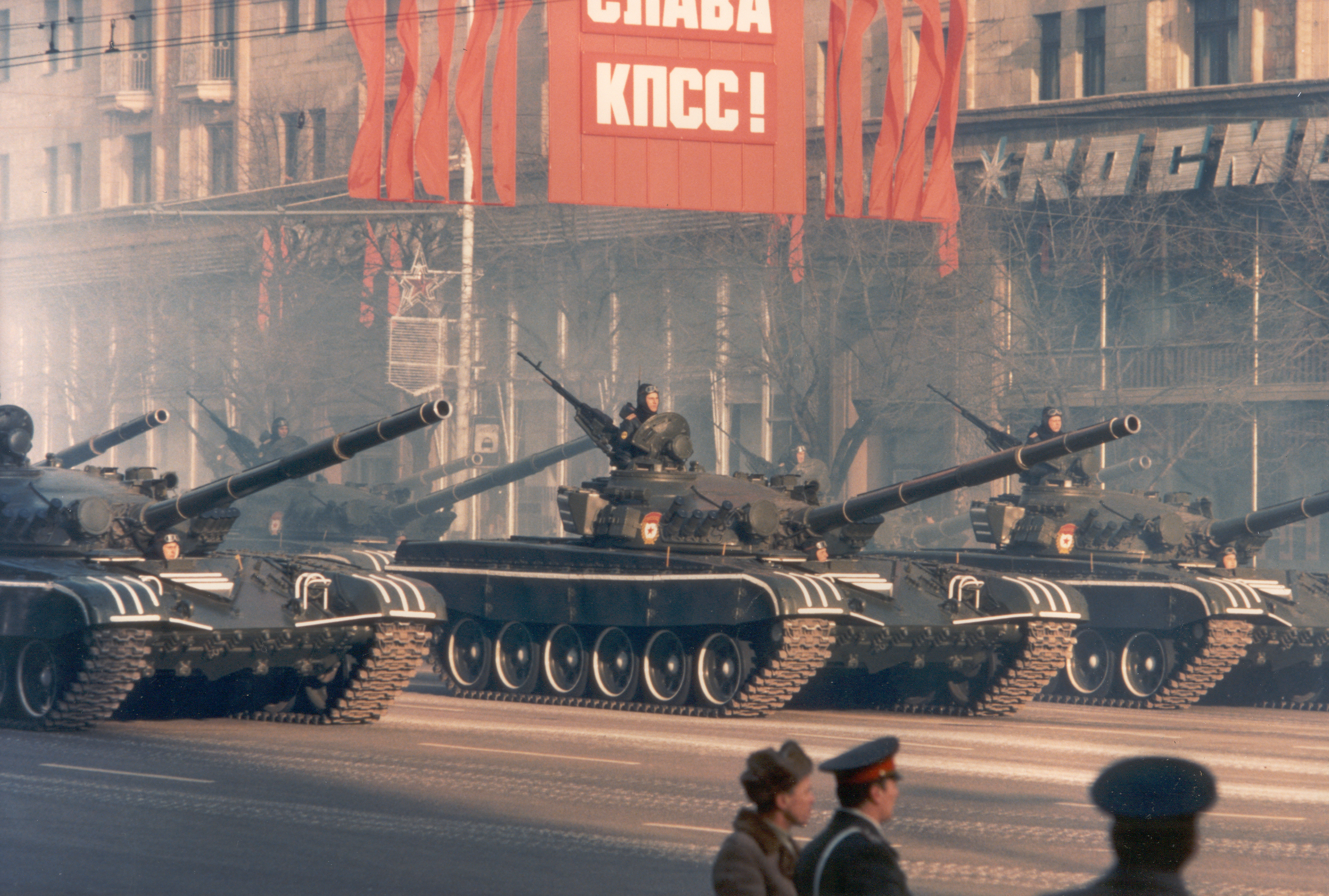
Tanks headed to Red Square.

Ethiopian leader Mengistu Haile Mariam was in attendance at the parade of 1980. The 1981 parade was the first to introduce a new massed bands formation within Moscow. This included the full implementation of the sousaphone in the back row, as well as drummers added to the front line, spaced in between the fanfare trumpets. A new model ZiL limousine used for the inspection tour was also included. The 1982 parade marked the 65th anniversary of the revolution, as well as the diamond jubilee of the USSR. It was the last parade attended by Leonid Brezhnev as he would die three days later. In 1983, Yuri Andropov (the Soviet leader at the time) did not attend the parade due to a sickness prior to the parade, which became the first parade not to be attended by a Soviet leader. 1984 saw the participation of the Kaliningrad Higher Naval School.

=== 1987 ===
The 1987 parade celebrated the 70th anniversary of the October Revolution. General Secretary Mikhail Gorbachev, other members of the Politburo and the heads of foreign states were present on the grandstand of Lenin's Mausoleum for the jubilee parade. It saw the participation of a Russian Revolution historical regiment (including a color guard consisting of 50 Civil War era colors as well soldiers in the uniforms of Red Guards and the former Imperial Russian Army) led by Major Nikolai Kravchenko as well as a Great Patriotic War Regiment (led by a 12-member tri-services color guard of the Victory Banner) led by Major General Vasily Zdunov.

=== 1988 and 1989 ===
From 1988 to 1990, on the Second Program of the State Television and Radio Broadcasting, it was broadcast with sign language translation. The 1989 parade was the only one to have a drill routine by the massed bands take place.

=== 1990 ===
The 1990 parade celebrated the 73rd anniversary of the revolution. Among those present were President Mikhail Gorbachev, Premier Nikolai Ryzhkov, Russian leader Boris Yeltsin, and Moscow Mayor Gavriil Popov. It is the only Soviet parade when the inspection of troops are held after the President's speech and anthem. It was also the last military parade to feature military equipment, something that would not be seen until the 2008 Moscow Victory Day Parade. During the final parade, an assassination attempt was made on the life of President Gorbachev.

== List of parade leaders (since 1941) ==
Year	Parade commander	Parade inspector	Year	Parade commander	Parade inspector
1941	Colonel General Pavel Artemyev	Marshal Semyon Budyonny	1946	Colonel General Pavel Artemyev	Marshal Leonid Govorov
1947	Marshal Kirill Meretskov	Marshal Nikolai Bulganin	1948	Marshal Kirill Meretskov	Marshal Semyon Timoshenko
1949	Colonel General Pavel Artemyev	Marshal Aleksandr Vasilevsky	1950	Colonel General Pavel Artemyev	Marshal Semyon Budyonny
1951	Colonel General Pavel Artemyev	Marshal Rodion Malinovsky	1952	Colonel General Pavel Artemyev	Marshal Semyon Timoshenko
1953	General of the Army Kirill Moskalenko	Marshal Nikolai Bulganin	1954	General of the Army Kirill Moskalenko	Marshal Nikolai Bulganin
1955	General of the Army Kirill Moskalenko	Marshal Georgy Zhukov	1956	General of the Army Kirill Moskalenko	Marshal Georgy Zhukov
1957	General of the Army Kirill Moskalenko	Marshal Rodion Malinovsky	1958	General of the Army Kirill Moskalenko	Marshal Rodion Malinovsky
1959	General of the Army Kirill Moskalenko	Marshal Rodion Malinovsky	1960	Мarshal Nikolay Krylov	Marshal Rodion Malinovsky
1961	Мarshal Nikolay Krylov	Marshal Rodion Malinovsky	1962	Мarshal Nikolay Krylov	Marshal Rodion Malinovsky
1963	General of the Army Afanasy Beloborodov	Marshal Rodion Malinovsky	1964	General of the Army Afanasy Beloborodov	Marshal Rodion Malinovsky
1965	General of the Army Afanasy Beloborodov	Marshal Rodion Malinovsky	1966	General of the Army Afanasy Beloborodov	Marshal Rodion Malinovsky
1967	Colonel General Yevgeny Ivanovsky	Marshal Andrei Grechko	1968	Colonel General Yevgeny Ivanovsky	Marshal Andrei Grechko
1969	Colonel General Yevgeny Ivanovsky	Marshal Andrei Grechko	1970	Colonel General Yevgeny Ivanovsky	Marshal Andrei Grechko
1971	Colonel General Yevgeny Ivanovsky	Marshal Andrei Grechko	1972	Colonel General Vladimir Govorov	Marshal Andrei Grechko
1973	Colonel General Vladimir Govorov	Marshal Andrei Grechko	1974	Colonel General Vladimir Govorov	Marshal Andrei Grechko
1975	Colonel General Vladimir Govorov	Marshal Andrei Grechko	1976	Colonel General Vladimir Govorov	Marshal Dmitry Ustinov
1977	General of the Army Vladimir Govorov	Marshal Dmitry Ustinov	1978	General of the Army Vladimir Govorov	Marshal Dmitry Ustinov
1979	General of the Army Vladimir Govorov	Marshal Dmitry Ustinov	1980	Colonel General Vladimir Govorov	Marshal Dmitry Ustinov
1981	General of the Army Petr Lushev	Marshal Dmitry Ustinov	1982	General of the Army Petr Lushev	Marshal Dmitry Ustinov
1983	General of the Army Petr Lushev	Marshal Dmitry Ustinov	1984	General of the Army Petr Lushev	Marshal Sergey Sokolov
1985	Colonel General Vladimir Arkhipov	Marshal Sergey Sokolov	1986	Colonel General Vladimir Arkhipov	General of the Army Petr Lushev
1987	Colonel General Vladimir Arkhipov	General of the Army Dmitry Yazov	1988	General of the Army Konstantin Kochetov	General of the Army Dmitry Yazov
1989	Colonel General Nikolai Kalinin	General of the Army Dmitry Yazov	1990	Colonel General Nikolai Kalinin	Marshal Dmitry Yazov

== See also ==
- Moscow Victory Day Parade
- International Workers' Day
- Victory Day Parades
- List of Victory Day Parades in Minsk
