= 1981 October Revolution Parade =

The 1981 October Revolution Parade took place on Moscow's Red Square on November 7, 1981, and was dedicated to the 64th anniversary of the October Revolution. General Secretary Leonid Brezhnev was among the high-ranking party members who attended the parade. Taking the salute was Dmitry Ustinov, Minister of Defense of the USSR and Marshal of the Soviet Union. Commanding the parade was Petr Lushev, commander of the Moscow Military District. The music was performed by the Combined Orchestra of the Moscow Garrison and conducted by Major General Nikolai Mikhailov.

== See also ==
- October Revolution
- Public holidays in the Soviet Union
- 1975 October Revolution Parade
