= 57th Separate Airborne Brigade =

57th Air Assault Brigade (1 Oct 1979-1 Jun 1990) 57th Airborne Brigade (1 Jun 1990-May 1991)
- Active: 1979-1991
- Country: Soviet Union
- Branch: Soviet Ground Forces (1979-1990); Soviet Airborne Forces (1990-1991)
- Type: Airborne
- Size: Brigade
- Garrison/HQ: Aktogay

The 57th Airborne Brigade was an airborne brigade of the Soviet Airborne Forces, disbanded in 1991. It was based in Aktogay.

== History ==
The 57th Separate Air Assault Brigade was established on 1 October 1979 from elements of the 383rd Guards Airborne Regiment in Aktogay, part of the Central Asian Military District. It was composed of three airborne battalions, an air assault battalion, an artillery battalion and an antiaircraft artillery battalion. On 1 June 1990, it was transferred to the Soviet Airborne Forces and renamed the 57th Airborne Brigade. Its air assault battalion was disbanded and the antiaircraft artillery battalion became a battery. In September 1990, it was ordered that the brigade be disbanded. The process was completed by May 1991. The brigade vehicles and equipment were transferred to the Latvian Soviet Socialist Republic.
