= Pyotr Lushev =

Soviet army general (1923–1997)

Pyotr Georgievich Lushev
- Lushev in 1980
- Native name: Пётр Гео́ргиевич Лу́шев
- Born: 18 October 1923; Poboishche village, Yemetsky Uyezd, Arkhangelsk Governorate, Russian SFSR, Soviet Union
- Died: 23 March 1997 (aged 73) Moscow, Russia
- Allegiance: Soviet Union
- Branch: Soviet Army
- Service years: 1941–1992
- Rank: Army General
- Commands: 1st Guards Tank Army; Volga Military District; Central Asian Military District; Moscow Military District; Soviet Forces in Germany; Unified Armed Forces of the Warsaw Treaty Organization
- Conflicts: World War II; Volkhov Front; Leningrad Front; Sinyavin offensive
- Awards: Hero of the Soviet Union; Order of Lenin (2); Order of the Red Banner; Order of the Patriotic War, 1st class; Order of the Red Star (2)

Pyotr Georgievich Lushev (Russian: Пётр Гео́ргиевич Лу́шев; 18 October 1923 – 23 March 1997) was an Army General of the Soviet Army during the Cold War who was the last Supreme Commander of the Unified Armed Forces of the Warsaw Treaty Organization. Lushev was made a Hero of the Soviet Union on his birthday in 1983.

== Early life ==
Pyotr Georgievich Lushev was born into a peasant family in the village Poboishche Emetsky district of the Arkhangelsk province (now the Kholmogorsky district of the Arkhangelsk region), Russia. A few years later, the family moved to the settlement of the lumber mill named after Lenin (LDK No. 3) within the boundaries of Arkhangelsk. He graduated from secondary school No. 95 in Arkhangelsk

== World War II ==
Immediately after the start of the Great Patriotic War in August 1941, Lushev was drafted into the Red Army. He graduated from the courses as a junior lieutenant. He entered active service in the army in June 1942. He fought on the Volkhov and Leningrad fronts. He commanded an infantry platoon, and from 1944 a rifle company. In 1945 he got promoted to senior adjutant of the battalion. This post now corresponds to chief-of-staff of the battalion.

Lushev participated to the Sinyavin offensive operation in 1942, during which he was wounded, the Leningrad-Novgorod operation, the Baltic operation, and the blockade of the Courland pocket.

== Cold War ==
After the war in 1947, he graduated from the officer training courses. He served as chief of staff of a tank battalion, and then later a commander of a tank battalion. He was a member of the Communist Party of the Soviet Union since 1951. In 1954 he graduated from the Military Academy of Armored Forces named after JV Stalin. In 1954, he commanded a tank regiment, and was later a deputy commander and then a commander of a tank division. In 1966 he graduated from the Military Academy of the General Staff.

From June 1969 he was first deputy commander, and from November 1971 - commander of the 1st Guards Tank Army in the Group of Soviet Forces in Germany ( Dresden, GDR ). In 1973 he graduated from the Higher Academic Courses at the Military Academy of the General Staff. On July 30, 1973 he was made First Deputy Commander-in-Chief of the Group of Soviet Forces in Germany. In June 1975 was made a commander of the troops of the Volga Military District, colonel-general (February 1976). In December 1977 - commander of the troops of the Central Asian Military District. In November 1980 - commander of the troops of the Moscow Military District. The military rank "army general" was conferred by the Decree of the Presidium of the Supreme Soviet of the USSR of November 2, 1981. In July 1985 he was made the Commander-in-Chief of the Group of Soviet Forces in Germany.

June 1986 - First Deputy Minister of Defense of the USSR . Since January 24, 1989 - Commander-in-Chief of the United Armed Forces of the Warsaw Treaty member states, he was the last military commander to occupy this post. Since April 26, 1991 - military inspector-adviser of the Group of Inspectors General of the Ministry of Defense of the USSR.

Member of the Supreme Soviet of the USSR 10th and 11th convocations (1979–1989). People's Deputy of the USSR in 1989–1991. Member of the CPSU Central Committee in 1981–1990.

== Later life and legacy ==
In 1992 he retired, living in Moscow before his death on 23 March 1997; Lushev is buried in the Novodevichy Cemetery.

In memory of Pyotr Lushev in 2005, a memorial plaque was erected on the building of the secondary school No. 95 in the city of Arkhangelsk, which he graduated from.

Military offices
Preceded by Ivan Herasymov	Commander of the 1st Guards Tank Army; 1971–1973	Succeeded by Boris Snetkov
Preceded by	Commander of the Volga Military District; 1975–1977	Succeeded by
Preceded by Nikolai Lyashchenko	Commander of the Central Asian Military District; 1977–1980	Succeeded by Dmitry Yazov
Preceded by Vladimir Leonidovich Govorov	Commander of the Moscow Military District; 1980–1985	Succeeded by Vladimir M Arkhipov
Preceded by Mikhail Zaitsev	Commander of Soviet Forces in Germany; 1985–1986	Succeeded by Valeriy A. Belikov
Preceded by Viktor Kulikov	Supreme Commander of the Unified Armed Forces of the Warsaw Treaty Organization; 1989–1991	Succeeded by post abolished
