= Nikolai Lyashchenko =

Soviet army general (1910–2000)

Nikolai Grigorevich Lyashchenko
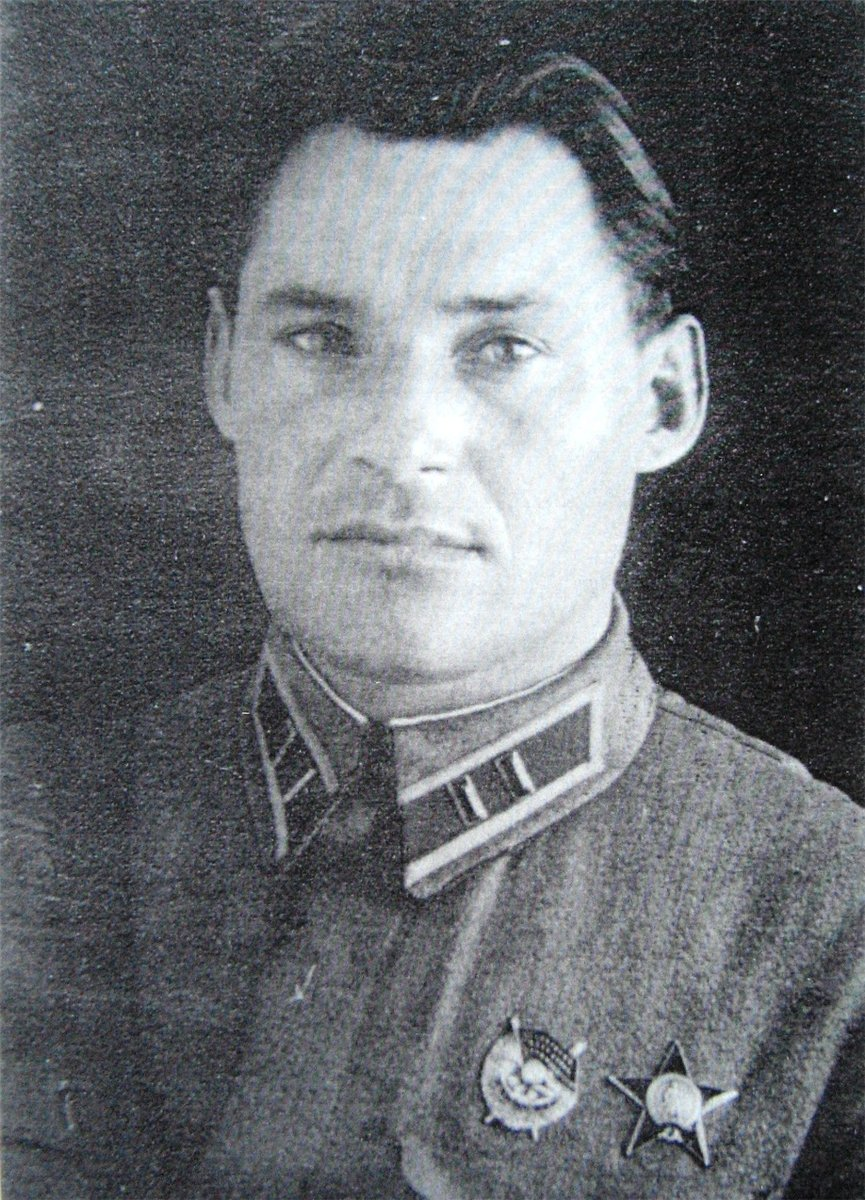
- Born: 16 May [O.S. 3 May] 1910; Zima, Irkutsk Governorate, Russian Empire
- Died: 10 October 2000 (aged 90); Moscow, Russia
- Burial place: Kuntsevo Cemetery
- Alma mater: Frunze Military Academy; Voroshilov Higher Military Academy
- Military career
- Allegiance: Soviet Union
- Branch: Soviet Army
- Rank: General of the army
- Conflicts: Spanish Civil War; World War II
- Awards: Hero of the Soviet Union, Order of Zhukov, Order of Lenin, Order of the October Revolution, Order of the Red Banner, Order of Suvorov, Order of Kutuzov, Order of the Patriotic War, Order of the Red Star, Order "For Service to the Homeland in the Armed Forces of the USSR", Medal "For the Victory over Germany in the Great Patriotic War 1941–1945", Jubilee Medal "In Commemoration of the 100th Anniversary of the Birth of Vladimir Ilyich Lenin", Medal "For Distinction in Guarding the State Border of the USSR", Medal "For the Defence of Leningrad"

Nikolai Grigorevich Lyashchenko (Russian: Николай Григорьевич Лященко; 16 May [O.S. 3 May] 1910 – 10 October 2000) was a Soviet Army general. He fought on the Republican side in Spain and against Nazi Germany.

== Biography ==
Born at Zima station in Irkutsk Governorate, now a city in Irkutsk Oblast. Son of a blacksmith (one of the political exiles) and a peasant woman. Before the October Revolution of 1917, he moved to Kyrgyzstan with his family. Lived in the city of Przhevalsk (now Karakol). He finished 2 classes of evening workers' school. Worked as a groom, hammerman, assistant blacksmith at the Uryuktinsky stud farm, from 1925 - a blacksmith in the village of Sazanovka, Issyk-Kul District, from 1928 to September 1929 - a member of the trade union committee of the Uryuktinsky stud farm in Karakol, from February 1929 - an instructor in the trade union committee of agricultural workers in the village of Sazanovka, Kirghiz ASSR and an instructor of the district branch of the trade union of agricultural workers in Karakol.

In the autumn of 1929, the Soviet-Chinese conflict on the Chinese Eastern Railway arose. In October 1929, Nikolai Lyashchenko voluntarily joined the Red Army to participate in the defense of the CER from Chinese militarists. The conflict was soon resolved, and he was sent to study at the Lenin United Central Asian Military School in Tashkent, from which he graduated in 1932. He was a member of the Communist Party of the Soviet Union since 1931. During his studies, as part of the combined cadet detachments, he repeatedly participated in combat operations against the Basmachi movement in Central Asia. For distinction in battle, he was awarded a personalized weapon. After finishing school, in 1932 he served in the 217th Rifle Regiment of the 73rd Rifle Division of the Siberian Military District in Omsk: rifle platoon commander, assistant commander and commander of a rifle company, deputy battalion commander, head of a sniper team, head of the regimental school for junior commanders. For the excellent combat training of the unit, in 1936 he was awarded his first order - the Order of the Red Star.

From May 1937 to October 1938, Major Lyashchenko participated in the Spanish Civil War, was a military advisor to the commanders of the division and corps of the Republican Army. He was awarded the Order of the Red Banner. Immediately after returning to the Soviet Union, he was sent to study. In 1941 he graduated from the Frunze Military Academy. From May 1941 - deputy commander of the 737th rifle regiment of the 206th Rifle Division in the Odessa Military District in Zaporozhye.

=== World War II ===
Major Lyashchenko fought in the Great Patriotic War from the very first days. From June 25 - commander of the 2nd reserve rifle regiment of the 11th rifle brigade (Dnepropetrovsk), from July 13 - commander of the 972nd rifle regiment of the 255th Rifle Division. He took part in the defense of Dnepropetrovsk in August–September 1941, his regiment was the last to leave the city and blew up the bridges across the Dnieper behind them; then he took part in the Tiraspol-Melitopol offensive and Donbass defensive operations and in the Barvenkovo–Lozovaya offensive.

From February 1, 1942, he was deputy commander of the 255th rifle division on the Southern Front. From March 7, 1942 he was the commander of the 106th Rifle Division. In May 1942, during the Second Battle of Kharkov, the division was surrounded, but Lyashchenko led the greatly depleted, but still combat-ready units of the division to their own (on May 20, the division broke out of the encirclement, and on May 25, it was reintroduced into battle). During the Voronezh-Voroshilovgrad defensive operation on July 17, 1942, he was surrounded for the second time on the Southwestern Front in the Millerovo area, and on August 3, he reached his own with a detachment of fighters. He was already officially declared missing in action. After an NKVD check in September 1942, he was demoted to deputy commander of the 18th Rifle Division on the Volkhov Front. He took part in breaking the Siege of Leningrad. In March 1942, he was slightly wounded, and in July 1942, he was shell-shocked. From March 3, 1943 - commander of the 73rd Marine Rifle Brigade on the Leningrad Front. From May 29, 1943 until the end of the war, he commanded the 90th Rifle Division as part of the 2nd Shock Army on the Leningrad and 2nd Belorussian Front. In January 1944, Lyashchenko's division distinguished itself in the Leningrad–Novgorod offensive, during which, with a blow from the Oranienbaum Bridgehead, it broke through the German defenses that had been under construction for two and a half years, closed the encirclement ring around the enemy group and liberated the cities of Ropsha and Gatchina. In March 1944, he took part in offensive battles in the Pskov direction, which ended in failure. During the Vyborg Operation in June 1944, he distinguished himself in the capture of the city of Uuras and the storming of the fortress city of Vyborg. Lyashchenko was the first Soviet military commandant of Vyborg.

In September 1944, the 90th Rifle Division was transferred to the Baltics, where it again distinguished itself in the liberation of the Estonian SSR from the enemy (the Tallinn offensive, during which the division not only broke through the German defenses, but over the next 10 days fought its way through almost 300 kilometers, liberating two cities and about 300 other settlements), in the East Prussian, East Pomeranian, and Berlin Operations. General Lyashchenko's division liberated the cities of Pärnu, Osterode, Gniew, Starogard, Danzig, and Swinemünde. The last combat operation of the 90th Division was the landing on the island of Rügen off the German coast. In total, during the war, the 90th Rifle Division was mentioned 16 times in the orders of the Supreme Commander-in-Chief, Joseph Stalin. Its commander, Major General Lyashchenko, was nominated for the title of Hero of the Soviet Union in May 1945 for the breakthrough from the Oder to Rügen during the Battle of Berlin (the division covered over 250 kilometers, captured 170 guns, 850 machine guns and over 5,000 prisoners). The nomination was signed by the commander of the 108th Rifle Corps Vitaliy Polenov, he was supported by the commander of the 2nd Shock Army Ivan Fedyuninsky, but he was not awarded the title of Hero, instead he was awarded a third Order of the Red Banner. On November 13, 1945, he signed an agreement with British Major General Colin Barber, which is well known in Western historiography, on the demarcation of the border between the Soviet and British occupation zones (which later became the border between the GDR and the FRG) in the provinces of Mecklenburg and Schleswig-Holstein.

=== Post-war ===
He commanded the 90th Rifle Division until February 1946, then was sent for training. In February 1948, Lyaschenko graduated from the Voroshilov Higher Military Academy, and in 1957 and 1970 - the Higher Academic Courses at Voroshilov Military Academy of the General Staff of the USSR Armed Forces. After graduating from the academy, he successively commanded the 10th Mechanized Division in the 39th Army in Transbaikal (since May 1948), the 11th Guards Rifle Corps in the Moscow Military District (since October 1953), and the 12th Rifle Corps in the North Caucasus Military District (since June 1956). From December 24, 1957 - First Deputy Commander of the Turkestan Military District. From November 1963 — Commander of the Volga Military District. From December 1965 — Commander of the Turkestan Military District. On February 22, 1968 Lyashchenko was awarded the military rank of General of the Army.

From August 1969 he served as Commander of the Central Asian Military District, led the strengthening of the defense of the Soviet-Chinese border after the Border conflict near Lake Zhalanashkol in 1969. From November 1977 — Military Inspector-Adviser to the Group of Inspectors General in the Soviet Ministry of Defense. He was awarded the title of Hero of the Soviet Union by decree of the President of the USSR Mikhail Gorbachev on October 4, 1990 for courage and heroism shown on the fronts of the Great Patriotic War.

In May 1992 he formally retired. After retirement, he actively participated in public life, appeared in the press a lot. He lived in Moscow. He died at the age of 91 and was buried at the Kuntsevo Cemetery.

From 1966 to 1971 he was a candidate member of the Central Committee of the Communist Party of the Soviet Union. From 1971 to 1981 he was a full member of that body. Deputy of the Supreme Soviet of the Soviet Union of the 7th-9th convocations (1966-1979). He was also a member of the Bureau of the Central Committee of the Communist Party of Uzbekistan (1966-1971) and Kazakhstan (1971-1976). Deputy of the Supreme Soviet of the RSFSR, deputy of the Supreme Soviet of the Kyrgyz SSR.

== Awards ==
- Hero of the Soviet Union
- Order of Zhukov
- Order of Lenin
- Order of the October Revolution
- Order of the Red Banner
- Order of Suvorov
- Order of Kutuzov
- Order of the Patriotic War
- Order of the Red Star
- Order "For Service to the Homeland in the Armed Forces of the USSR"
- Medal "For the Victory over Germany in the Great Patriotic War 1941–1945"
- Jubilee Medal "In Commemoration of the 100th Anniversary of the Birth of Vladimir Ilyich Lenin"
- Medal "For Distinction in Guarding the State Border of the USSR"
- Medal "For the Defence of Leningrad"
- Jubilee Medal "Twenty Years of Victory in the Great Patriotic War 1941–1945"
- Jubilee Medal "Thirty Years of Victory in the Great Patriotic War 1941–1945"
- Jubilee Medal "Forty Years of Victory in the Great Patriotic War 1941–1945"
- Jubilee Medal "50 Years of Victory in the Great Patriotic War 1941–1945"
- Medal "In Commemoration of the 850th Anniversary of Moscow"
- Medal "For the Capture of Königsberg"
- Medal "Veteran of the Armed Forces of the USSR"
- Medal "For Strengthening of Brotherhood in Arms"
- Jubilee Medal "70 Years of the Armed Forces of the USSR"
- Medal "In Commemoration of the 800th Anniversary of Moscow"
- Medal "In Commemoration of the 250th Anniversary of Leningrad"
- Badge "To a Warrior-Internationalist".

Preceded by Ivan Pavlovski	Commander of the Volga Military District; 1963–1965	Succeeded by Nikolai Ogarkov
Preceded by Ivan Fedyuninsky	Commander of the Turkestan Military District; 1965–1969	Succeeded by Stepan Belonozko
Preceded by Macarius Lipatov	Commander of the Central Asian Military District; 1969–1977	Succeeded by Pyotr Lushev
