= 1975 October Revolution Parade =

The 1975 October Revolution Parade was a parade on Red Square dedicated to the 58th anniversary of the October Revolution on November 7, 1975. Marshal of the Soviet Union Andrei Grechko gave his last speech on the grandstand of Lenin's Mausoleum, before he died the following April. Commanding the parade was the head of the Moscow Military District Colonel General Vladimir Govorov. Providing the music for his final parade, was conducted by Major General Nikolai Nazarov of the combined massed bands of the Moscow Garrison. A scaled down display of military technologies that excluded tanks was also present, which cut the parade down to 30 minutes as a result. General Secretary of the Communist Party of the Soviet Union Leonid Brezhnev and Soviet Prime Minister Alexei Kosygin were present at the parade.

A color guard unit marched past there for the 1st time since 1967, but with the Victory Banner at the lead. This was done to mark the 30th anniversary of the end of the Second World War, which wasn't marked with the usual Victory Day Parade on 9 May. The parade that year acted as the de facto Victory Day Parade for that jubilee year.

== Debut appearance of the fanfare trumpeters and fifers of the Moscow Military Music College ==
1975 being the 30th year since the Moscow Victory Parade of 1945, to honor this historic event the Moscow Military Music College debuted what would be a 27-year tradition of leading the Red Square parades with the snare drum beats of the Corps of Drums and its fanfare trumpeters and fifers, combined with its Turkish crescent and a pair of glockenspiels granted that year (which would be used until 1990 and replaced by the college banner since 1995, but the glockenspiels were retained with ornamental modifications) in honor of the cadets who marched past on that day. For the only time in its history the Corps march past first to the tune of fifes and drums, and then by the fanfare trumpeters sounding the "Glory to the Motherland" March with the massed bands. From 1977 to 1990 the Corps led the parade playing the tune "Comrades, We Bravely March!" (With the exception case for the 1990 Victory Day Parade, when the tune "Katyusha" and "Den Pobedy" was played by fifers and fanfare trumpeters respectively; and in 1995 the tune "We are Army of the People" was played instead) by the chromatic fanfare trumpeters preceded by the fifers of the school.

== Parade Units ==
- Massed Bands of the Moscow Military District
- Corps of Drums of the Moscow Military Music School
- Color Guard Unit led by the Victory Banner
- Frunze Military Academy
- V.I. Lenin Military Political Academy
- Felix Dzerzhinsky Artillery Academy
- Military Armored Forces Academy Marshal Rodion Malinovsky
- Military Engineering Academy
- Military Academy of Chemical Defense and Control
- Yuri Gagarin Air Force Academy
- Prof. Nikolai Zhukovsky Air Force Engineering Academy
- Kaliningrad Higher Naval School
- Moscow Border Guards Institute of the Border Defence Forces of the KGB "Moscow City Council"
- 98th Guards Airborne Division
- OMSDON
- 336th Marine Regiment of the Baltic Fleet
- Suvorov Military School
- Nakhimov Naval School
- Moscow Military High Command Training School "Supreme Soviet of the Russian SFSR"

== See also ==
- October Revolution

== Links ==
- Footage of the parade.
