= 2000 Moscow Victory Day Parade =

Russian military parade

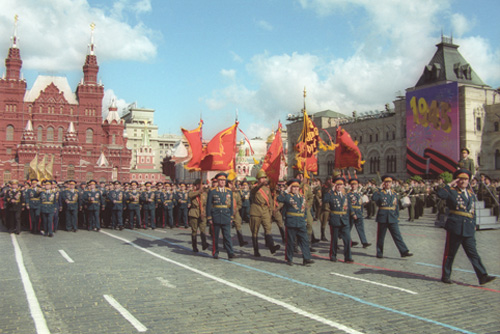
Veterans of the war parading on Red Square.

The 2000 Moscow Victory Day Parade was held on 9 May 2000 to commemorate the 55th anniversary of the capitulation of Nazi Germany in 1945. The parade marks the Soviet Union's victory in the Great Patriotic War.

== Particularities ==
The parade was commanded by Colonel General Igor Puzanov, Commander of the Moscow Military District, and reviewed by the Minister of Defence, Marshal of the Russian Federation Igor Sergeyev. The historical part of the parade was commanded by the former Moscow Military District commander General of the Army Vladimir Govorov. A speech was made by the newly elected president Vladimir Putin. Unlike other jubilee parades, this one in particular did not see the attendance of foreign heads of state and government as well as foreign delegations. This parade was the last to feature the old national anthem of Russia (used 1990–1991 by the Russian SFSR and 1991–2000 by the Russian Federation). It was also the last parade to feature veterans on foot.

== Troops participating in the parade ==
- The car carrying the commander of historical part of the parade General of the army Vladimir Govorov.
  - Corps of Drums of the Moscow Military Music School
  - Victory Banner
  - Veterans of the Karelian, Leningrad, 1st Baltic, 1st, 2nd and 3rd Belorussian and 1st, 2nd, 3rd and 4th Ukrainian fronts. These were followed by veterans of the Baltic and Black Sea Fleets of the Soviet Navy.
- The car carrying the commander of the parade Colonel General Ivan Puzanov
  - Honor Guard Battalion of the 154th Independent Commandant's Regiment
  - Great Patriotic War Liberators Regiment (dressed in cloaks and armed with PPSh-41s)
  - Combined Arms Academy of the Armed Forces of the Russian Federation
  - Peter the Great Military Academy of the Strategic Missile Forces
  - Military Engineering Academy named after Kuibyshev
  - Military University of Radiation, Chemical and Biological Defense named after Marshal Timoshenko
  - Gagarin Air Force Academy
  - Military Aviation Technical University named after NE Zhukovsky
  - Military University of the Ministry of Defense of the Russian Federation
  - St. Petersburg Naval Institute
  - Moscow Border Institute
  - 331st Guards Airborne Regiment
  - Internal Troops of the Ministry of Internal Affairs of Russia
  - 336th Guards Naval Infantry Brigade of the Baltic Fleet
  - Suvorov Military School
  - Nakhimov Naval School
  - Moscow Higher Military Command School

Almost a third of the parade participants arrived in Moscow from the Commonwealth of Independent States and Baltic states.

== Music ==
The parade on Red Square ended with the passage of the Combined Military Band consisting of the Central Military Band of the Ministry of Defense, the Headquarters of the Moscow Military District, and the Central Navy Band of Russia, numbering 600 musicians, under the direction of Lieutenant General Viktor Afanasyev.

Inspection and Address

- Potpourri of March of the Preobrazhensky Regiment (Марш Преображенского Полка) and Slow March of the Officers Schools (Встречный Марш офицерских училищ)
- Jubilee Slow March "25 Years of the Red Army" (Юбилейный встречный марш "25 лет РККА) by Semeon Tchernetsky
- Slow March of the Tankmen (Встречный Марш Танкистов) by Semyon Tchernetsky
- Slow March of the Guards of the Navy (Гвардейский Встречный Марш Военно-Морского Флота) by Nikolai Pavlocich Ivanov-Radkevich
- Slow March of the Officers Schools (Встречный Марш офицерских училищ) by Semyon Tchernetsky
- Slow March (Встречный Марш) by Dmitry Pertsev
- Slow March of the Red Army (Встречный Марш Красной Армии) by Semyon Tchernetsky
- March of the Preobrazhensky Regiment (Марш Преображенского Полка)
- Jubilee Slow March "25 Years of the Red Army" (Юбилейный встречный марш "25 лет РККА) by Semeon Tchernetsky
- Slow March of the Tankmen (Встречный Марш Танкистов) by Semyon Tchernetsky
- Slow March of the Guards of the Navy (Гвардейский Встречный Марш Военно-Морского Флота) by Nikolai Pavlocich Ivanov-Radkevich
- Slow March of the Officers Schools (Встречный Марш офицерских училищ) by Semyon Tchernetsky
- Glory (Славься) by Mikhail Glinka
- Parade Fanfare "May 9" (Парадная Фанфара "9 Мая") by Nikolai Camokhvalov
- State Anthem of the Russian Federation (Patriotic Song) – Государственный Гимн Российской Федерации (Патриотическая Песня) by Mikhail Glinka
- Fanfare

Veteran and Infantry Columns and Conclusion

- Sacred War (Священная Война) by Alexandr Alexandrov
- March from the theme of the song “On an Unknown Hill” (Марш на темы песни «На безымянной высоте»)
- In the Dugout (В землянке) by Alexei Surkov
- Blue Scarf (Синий платочек) by Jerzy Petersbursky
- Farewell of Slavianka (Прощание Славянки) by Vasiliy Agapkin
- Parade Fanfare All Listen! (Парадная Фанфара «Слушайте все!») by Andrei Golovin
- March Victory (Марш "Победа") by Albert Mikhailovich Arutyunov
- In Defense of the Homeland (В защиту Родины) by Viktor Sergeyevich Runov
- On Guard for the Peace (На страже Мира) by Boris Alexandrovich Diev
- Combat March (Строевой Марш) by Dmitry Illarionovich Pertsev
- Air March (Авиамарш) by Yuliy Abramovich Khait
- Leningrad (Ленинград) by Viktor Sergeyeich Runov
- We are the Army of the People (Мы Армия Народа) by Georgy Viktorovich Mavsesya
- We Need One Victory (Нам Нужна Одна Победа) by Bulat Shalvovich Okudzhava
- Sports March (Спортивный Марш) by Valentin Volkov
- On the Road (В Путь) by Vasily Pavlovich Solovyov-Sedoy
- Victory Day (День Победы) by David Fyodorovich Tukhmanov

== Gallery ==
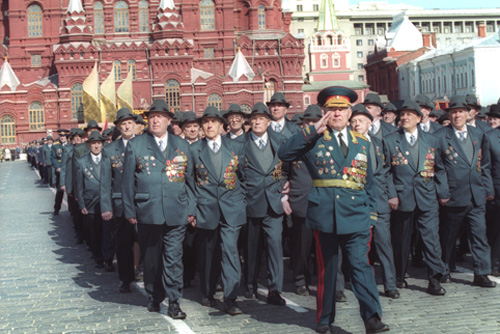

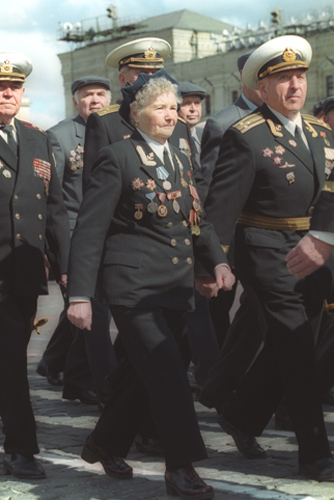

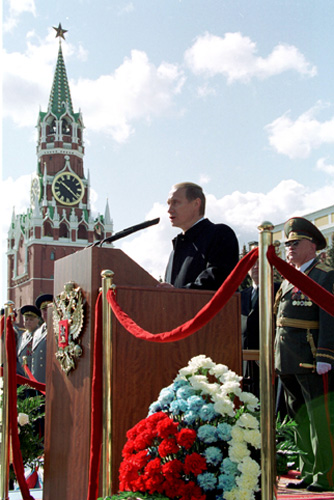
President Vladimir Putin during his speech

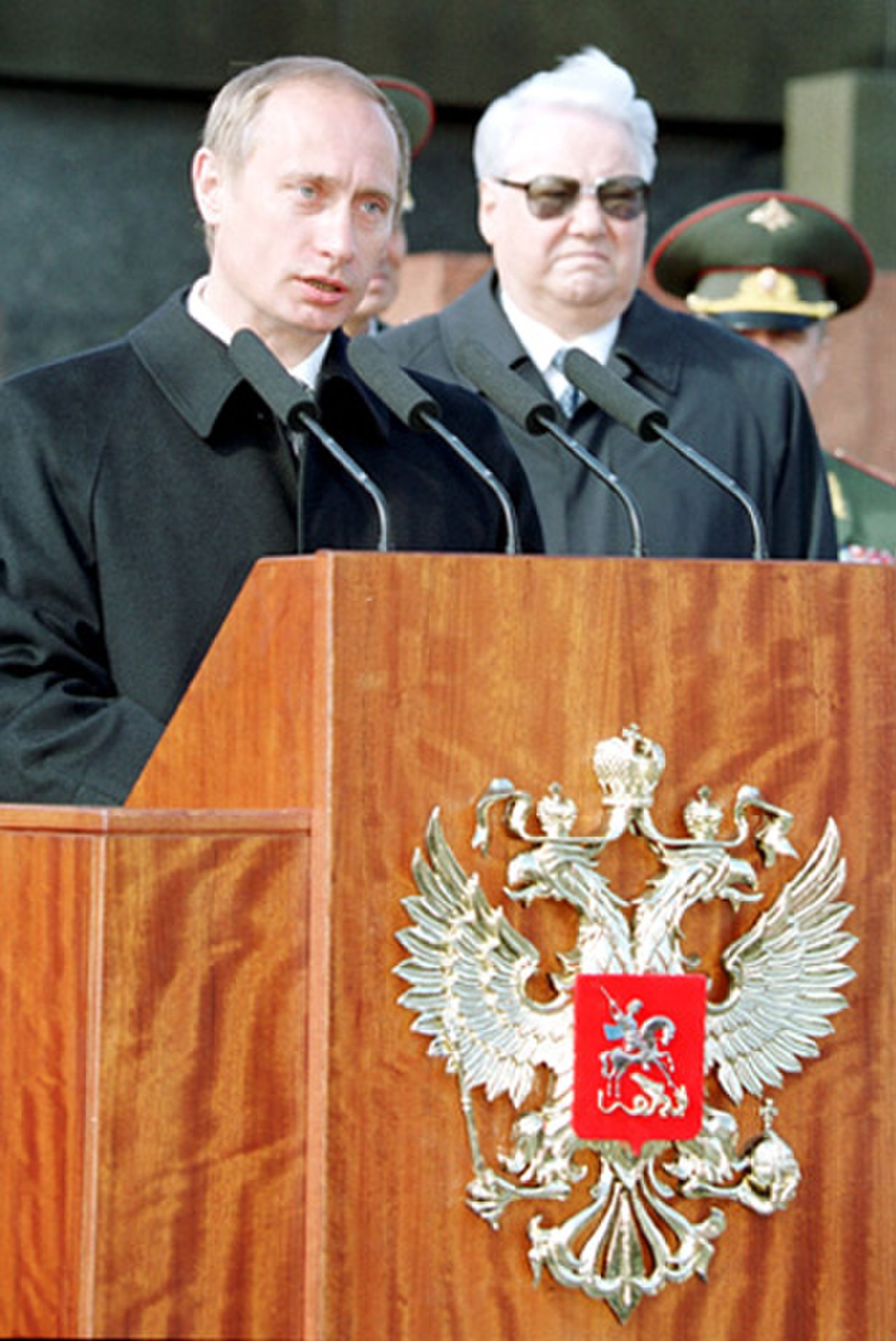

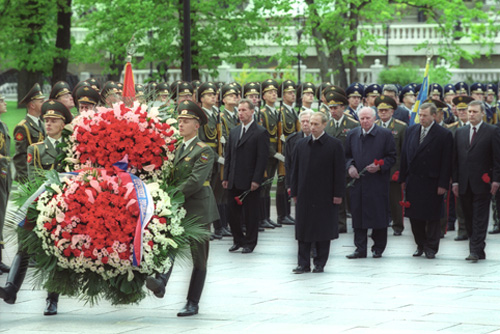
President Putin laying a wreath at the Tomb of the Unknown Soldier
