= Central Asian Military District =

- The territory of the Central Asian Military District in 1989.
- Active: 4 June 1926 – 9 July 1945; 24 June 1969 – 1 June 1989
- Country: Soviet Union (1926–1989)
- Type: Military district
- Headquarters: Tashkent (1926–1945); Almaty (1969–1989)
- Engagements: World War II

The Red Banner Central Asian Military District was a military district of the Soviet Armed Forces, which existed in 1926–1945 and 1969–1989, with its headquarters at Tashkent (1926–1945) and Almaty (1969–1989). By USSR Order No.304 of 4 June 1926, the Turkestan Front was renamed the Central Asian Military District.

== 1st Formation ==
On 22 June 1941 the Central Asian Military District included the 4th Cavalry Corps (18th, 20th, and 21st Mountain Cavalry Divisions), the 27th Mechanised Corps (9th and 53rd Tank Divisions and 221st Mechanised Division), the 58th Rifle Corps (68th, 83rd, 194th Mountain Rifle Divisions), and the independent 238th Rifle Division, and district troops, as well as the Air Forces of the Central Asian Military District. Under General Major M.P. Kharitonov, the Air Forces of the CAMD including 4th Aviation Brigade with 34th Bomber Aviation Regiment (SBs) (Tashkent) and 116th Regiment (I-153s) at Stalinabad).

As part of the Central Asian Military District, 53rd Army invading Iran was described by the Combat composition of the Soviet Army as including 58th Rifle Corps (68th and 83rd Mountain Rifle Divisions, 389th Rifle Division), 4th Cavalry Corps (18th, 20th, 39th Cavalry Divisions), 44th Cavalry Division, and 72nd Independent Mountain Rifle Regiment (огсп) on 1 October 1941.

The 74th and 75th (later to become the 27th Guards Rifle Division) Naval Rifle Brigades were formed in the district after a November–December 1941 People's Commissariat for Defence resolution.

On 9 July 1945, the district was split into the Turkestan and Steppe Military Districts.

== 2nd Formation ==
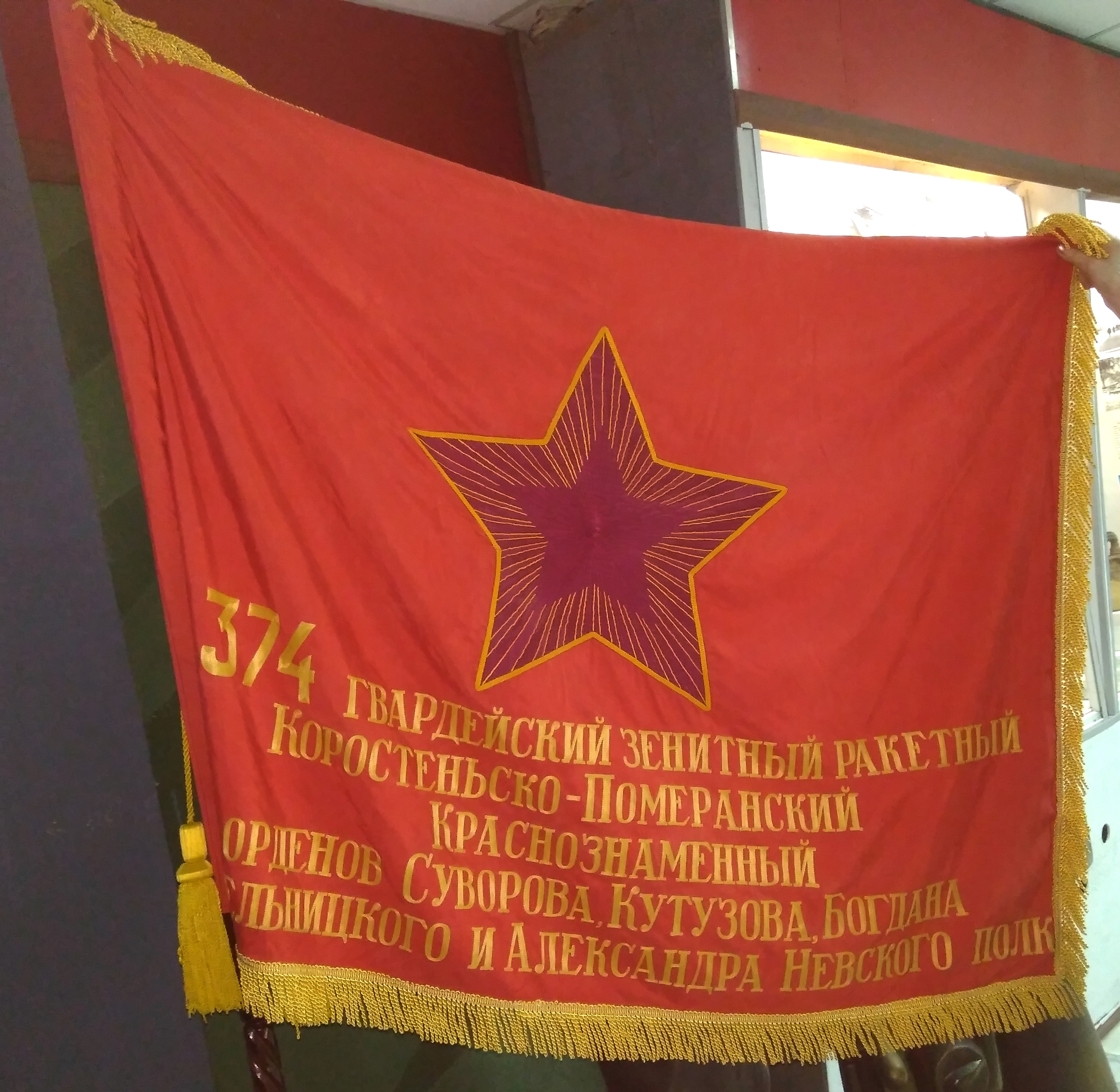
Battle flag of the 374th Guards Anti-Aircraft Rocket Regiment from its time serving in the Central Asian Military District.

In August 1964, the headquarters of the 18th Guards Army was relocated to Alma-Ata, where it became the operational group of the Turkestan Military District.

Five months after the fighting on Damansky Island, a similar situation repeated on a smaller scale in East Kazakhstan Region Kazakh SSR at Lake Zhalanashkol (see Sino-Soviet border conflict). The Chinese side lost 19 people killed. Two Soviet border guards were killed.

For this purpose, the leadership of the USSR Armed Forces took the following measures:

- In the Kazakh SSR and in the Far East in the 1960s, new military formations were established in the Long-Range Aviation and Strategic Rocket Forces
- Formations and units of the 39th Combined Arms Army were introduced into the Mongolian People's Republic

With the Chinese threat growing, a new district was established. The operational group was converted back into the 18th Army (without the Guards designation) on 4 March 1969, but was used to activate the headquarters of the Central Asian Military District on 24 June 1969.

Most of the forces in the district were deployed in the border areas with China. On sections of the border where the natural terrain facilitated the possible advance of the enemy, Fortified Regions were created, which were formations of machine-gun and artillery battalions in stationary positions.

In 1988 the CAMD included the 32nd Army and 17th Army Corps, and troops directly subordinate to district command. The 73rd Air Army provided air support, and air defence duties were carried out by the 12th and 14th Air Defence Armies. The 32nd Army (headquartered in Semipalatinsk) included a tank and three motor rifle divisions, anti-aircraft and missile brigades, artillery and rocket regiments, separate Flame-tank regiment, and others. The 17th Army Corps (headquartered in Frunze) included the 8th Guards Motor Rifle Division (Frunze), the 68th Motor Rifle Division (Sary Ozek), the 134th Motor Rifle Division (Dushanbe), the 68th Independent Motor Rifle Brigade (Osh), a mountain unit, and the 30th independent Motor Rifle Regiment (Kurdai in Dzhambulskaya Oblast). District units included the 80th Guards Training Motor Rifle Division and cadre artillery, rear defence, and motor-rifle divisions, 5th, 107th, and 108th communications brigades, and the 126th Rocket Brigade of surface-to-surface missiles.

In addition, the 57th Air Assault Brigade was based at Aktogay.

Air units of the district were deployed to Afghanistan.

== District forces in 1989 ==
The district was disestablished and its territory incorporated into the Turkestan Military District from 5 January 1989 on. At that time it had the following structure:

=== Formations and units under direct district subordination ===
District Command and Headquarters (Управление командующего и штаб) – Alma Ata, Kazakh SSR

- Separate Staff Security and Support Battalion (отдельный батальон охраны и обеспечения штаба) – Alma Ata
- 141st Separate Radio-technical Brigade OsNaz (141-я отдельная радиотехническая бригада ОсНаз) – Chengeldy (GRU formation operationally attached to the district)
- 27th Radio Intercept Regiment (27-й полк засечки и разведки) – Tselinograd (EW Directorate of the General Staff's (Управление РЭБ ГШ СССР) unit operationally attached to the district)
- 5th Separate Signals Brigade of the High Command (5-я отдельная бригада связи ВГК) – Alma Ata
- 108th Separate Signals Brigade (108-я отдельная бригада связи) – Taldıqorğan
- 107th Separate Signals Brigade (107-я отдельная бригада связи) – Burunday
- Separate Signals Battalion for Rear Services Communications (отдельный батальон связи тыла) – Burunday
- 57th Separate Landing Assault Brigade (57-я отдельная десантно-штурмовая бригада) – Aktogay
- 126th Ballistic Missile Brigade (126-я ракетная бригада) – Sary-Ozek
- 400th Gun Artillery Brigade (400-я пушечная артиллерийская бригада) – Akhtyubinsk
- 401st Anti-Tank Artillery Brigade (401-я противотанковая артиллерийская бригада)
- Artillery Reconnaissance Regiment (разведывательный артиллерийский полк) – Jambyl
- 75th Separate Radio-technical Brigade of the Land Forces' Air Defence (75-я отдельная радиотехническая бригада ПВО СВ) – Taldıqorğan
- 56th Separate Radio-technical Brigade of the Land Forces' Air Defence (56-я отдельная радиотехническая бригада ПВО СВ) – Shymkent
- 111th Engineer Sapper Brigade (111-я инженерно-сапёрная бригада) – Kapchagay
- 12th Chemical Defence Brigade (12-я бригада химической защиты) – Burunday
- Material Supply Brigade (бригада материального обеспечения) – Jambyl
- Repair and Overhaul Base (ремонтно-восстановительная база) – Alma Ata
- 2030th Separate Battalion for Field Water Supply (2030-й отдельный батальон полевого водоснабжения) – Kapchagay
- 210th Guards Military District Training Center (210-й гвардейский окружнный учебный центр), until 1988 the 80th Guards Training Motor Rifle Division (80-я гвардейская учебная мотострелковая дивизия) – Otar (Gvardeyskiy) (all the units, except for the 66th Training MRR, are based in Otar)
  - Commandant's Company [MP] (комендантская рота)
  - 112th Separate Guards Training Signals Battalion (112-й отдельный гвардейский учебный батальон связи)
  - 55th Guards Venskiy, awarded the Order of Kutuzov III degree and the Order of Alexander Nevsky Training Motor Rifle Regiment (55-й гвардейский учебный мотострелковый Венский орденов Кутузова III степени и Александра Невского полк)
  - 66th awarded the Order of Kutuzov and the Order of Bogdan Khmelnitsky Training Motor Rifle Regiment (66-й учебный орденов Кутузова и Богдана Хмельницкого мотострелковый полк) – Arys
  - 372nd Guards Kishinyovskiy, awarded the Order of Suvorov and the Order Kutuzov III degree Training Motor Rifle Regiment (372-й гвардейский учебный мотострелковый Кишинёвский орденов Суворова и Кутузова III степени полк)
  - 127th Guards Ropshinskiy, awarded the Order of the Red Banner and the Order of the Red Star Training Tank Regiment (127-й гвардейский учебный танковый Ропшинский Краснознамённый ордена Красной Звезды полк)
  - 171st Guards Kishinyovskiy, awarded the Order of Bogdan Khmelnitsky II degree Training Artillery Regiment (171-й гвардейский учебный артиллерийский Кишинёвский ордена Богдана Хмельницкого II степени полк)
  - Separate Training Surface-to-Surface Missile Battalion (отдельный учебный ракетный дивизион)
  - Separate Training Anti-Tank Battalion (отдельный учебный противотанковый дивизион)
  - 759th Tarnopolskiy Training Air Defence Missile and Artillery Regiment (759-й учебный зенитный ракетно-артиллерийский Тарнопольский полк)
  - Separate Reconnaissance Battalion (отдельный разведывательный батальон)
  - 90th Separate Guards Training Sapper Battalion (90-й отдельный гвардейский учебный инженерно-сапёрный батальон)
  - Separate Chemical Defence Battalion (отдельный батальон химической защиты)
  - 445th Separate Repair and Overhaul Battalion (445-й отдельный ремонтно-восстановительный батальон)
  - 589th Separate Medical Battalion (589-й отдельный медицинский батальон)
  - 725th Separate Material Supply Battalion (725-й отдельный батальон материального обеспечения)
- 269th Motor Rifle Division [cadred] (269-я мотострелковая дивизия кадра) – Otar (Gvardeyskiy)
- 64th Artillery Division [cadred] (64-я артиллерийская дивизия кадра) – Burunday
- 236th Division of Rear Area Security [cadred] (236-я дивизия охраны тыла кадра) – Otar (Gvardeyskiy)

=== Ground Forces of the Central Asian Military District ===
The Ground Forces of the military district consisted of the 32nd CA Army and the 17th Army Corps. At the time of the fusion of the CAMD into the Turkestan Military District in 1989 they consisted of:

==== 32nd Combined Arms Army ====
32nd Combined Arms Army (32-я общевойсковая армия)

Army Command and Headquarters (Управление командующего и штаб) – Semipalatinsk

- Separate Staff Security and Support Company (отдельная рота охраны и обеспечения) – Semipalatinsk
- 165th Separate SpetsNaz Company of the GRU (165-я отдельная рота спецназа ГРУ) – Ayagoz (GRU formation operationally attached to the army)
- Separate Radio Intercept Battalion (отдельный батальон засечки и разведки) – Ust-Kamenogorsk (EW Directorate of the General Staff's (Управление РЭБ ГШ СССР) unit operationally attached to the army)
- 210th Separate Signals Regiment (210-й отдельный полк связи) – Semipalatinsk
- 450th Separate Helicopter Regiment (450-й отдельный вертолётный полк) – Usharal
- 27th Separate Helicopter Squadron (27-я отдельная вертолётная эскадрилья) – Semipalatinsk
- 44th Ballistic Missile Brigade (44-я ракетная бригада) – Semipalatinsk
- 645th Gun Artillery Regiment (645-й пушечный артиллерийский полк) – Semipalatinsk
- 962nd Multiple Launch Rocket Regiment (962-й реактивный артиллерийский полк) – Ayagoz
- 935th Artillery Reconnaissance Regiment (935-й разведывательный артиллерийский полк) – Jambyl
- 272nd Missile Air Defence Brigade (272-я зенитно-ракетная бригада) – Ayagoz
- 2101st Separate Radio-technical Battalion of the Air Defence (2101-й отдельный радиотехнический батальон ПВО) – Semipalatinsk
- 750th Separate Engineer Sapper Battalion (750-й отдельный инженерно-сапёрный батальон) – Semipalatinsk
- Separate Mine-laying Engineer Battalion (отдельный инженерный батальон заграждений) – Ayagoz
- 634th Separate Engineer Road and Bridge Construction Battalion (634-й отдельный инженерный дорожно-мостовой батальон) – Talgar
- 77th Material Supply Brigade (77-я бригада материального обеспечения) – Semipalatinsk
- Repair and Overhaul Base (ремонтно-восстановительная база) – Ayagoz
- 78th Tank Division (78-я танковая дивизия) – Ayagoz
  - 194th Separate Signals Battalion (194-й отдельный батальон связи) – Ayagoz
  - 156th Tank Regiment (156-й танковый полк) – Ayagoz
  - 180th Tank Regiment (180-й танковый полк) – Ayagoz
  - 143rd Tank Regiment (143-й танковый полк) – Aktogay
  - 369th Guards Motor Rifle Regiment (369-й гвардейский мотострелковый полк) – Usharal
  - 1062nd Artillery Regiment (1062-й артиллерийский полк) – Usharal
  - 1144th Missile Air Defence Regiment (1144-й зенитно-ракетный полк) – Aktogay
  - 345th Separate Ballistic Missile Battalion (345-й отдельный ракетный дивизион) – Ayagoz
  - 85th Separate Reconnaissance Battalion (85-й отдельный разведывательный батальон) – Ayagoz
  - 103rd Separate Sapper Engineer Battalion (103-й отдельный инженерно-сапёрный батальон) – Ayagoz
  - 546th Separate Chemical Defence Battalion (546-й отдельный батальон химической защиты) – Ayagoz
  - Separate Repair and Overhaul Battalion (отдельный ремонтно-восстановительный батальон) – Ayagoz
  - Separate Medical Battalion (отдельный медицинский батальон) – Aktogay
  - Separate Material Supply Battalion (отдельный батальон материального обеспечения) – Ayagoz
- 71st Motor Rifle Division (71-я мотострелковая дивизия) – Semipalatinsk (transformed into the 5202nd Weaponry and Equipment Storage Base (5202-я БХВТ) in 1989)
  - - (all units in Semipalatinsk) -
  - Separate Signals Battalion (отдельный батальон связи)
  - Motor Rifle Regiment (мотострелковый полк)
  - Motor Rifle Regiment (мотострелковый полк)
  - Motor Rifle Regiment (мотострелковый полк)
  - 620th Tank Regiment (620-й танковый полк)
  - Artillery Regiment (артиллерийский полк)
  - Missile Air Defence Regiment (зенитно-ракетный полк)
  - Separate Ballistic Missile Battalion (отдельный ракетный дивизион)
  - Separate Anti-Tank Battalion (отдельный противотанковый дивизион)
  - 236th Separate Reconnaissance Battalion (236-й отдельный разведывательный батальон)
  - 227th Separate Sapper Engineer Battalion (227-й отдельный инженерно-сапёрный батальон)
  - 636th Separate Chemical Defence Company (636-я отдельная рота химической защиты)
  - Separate Repair and Overhaul Battalion (отдельный ремонтно-восстановительный батальон)
  - Separate Medical Battalion (отдельный медицинский батальон)
  - Separate Material Supply Battalion (отдельный батальон материального обеспечения)
- 155th Motor Rifle Division (155-я мотострелковая дивизия) – Ust-Kamenogorsk (transformed into the 5203rd Weaponry and Equipment Storage Base (5203-я БХВТ) in 1989)
  - - (all units in Ust-Kamenogorsk) -
  - 1069th Separate Signals Battalion (1069-й отдельный батальон связи)
  - 374th Motor Rifle Regiment (374-й мотострелковый полк)
  - 511th Motor Rifle Regiment (511-й мотострелковый полк)
  - 515th Motor Rifle Regiment (515-й мотострелковый полк)
  - 480th Tank Regiment (480-й танковый полк)
  - 931st Artillery Regiment (931-й артиллерийский полк)
  - Missile Air Defence Regiment (зенитно-ракетный полк)
  - Separate Ballistic Missile Battalion (отдельный ракетный дивизион)
  - Separate Anti-Tank Battalion (отдельный противотанковый дивизион)
  - 129th Separate Reconnaissance Battalion (129-й отдельный разведывательный батальон)
  - 1030th Separate Sapper Engineer Battalion (1030-й отдельный инженерно-сапёрный батальон)
  - Separate Chemical Defence Company (отдельная рота химической защиты)
  - Separate Repair and Overhaul Battalion (отдельный ремонтно-восстановительный батальон)
  - Separate Medical Battalion (отдельный медицинский батальон)
  - Separate Material Supply Battalion (отдельный батальон материального обеспечения)
- 203rd Motor Rifle Division (203-я мотострелковая дивизия) – Karaganda (transformed into the 5204th Weaponry and Equipment Storage Base (5204-я БХВТ) in 1989)
  - - (all units in Karaganda) -
  - 582nd Separate Signals Battalion (582-й отдельный батальон связи)
  - 31st Motor Rifle Regiment (31-й мотострелковый полк)
  - 53rd Motor Rifle Regiment (53-й мотострелковый полк)
  - 54th Guards Motor Rifle Regiment (54-й гвардейский мотострелковый полк)
  - 333rd Tank Regiment (333-й танковый полк)
  - 449th Artillery Regiment (449-й артиллерийский полк)
  - Missile Air Defence Regiment (зенитно-ракетный полк)
  - 970th Separate Ballistic Missile Battalion (970-й отдельный ракетный дивизион)
  - Separate Anti-Tank Battalion (отдельный противотанковый дивизион)
  - Separate Reconnaissance Battalion (отдельный разведывательный батальон)
  - 337th Separate Sapper Engineer Battalion (337-й отдельный инженерно-сапёрный батальон)
  - Separate Chemical Defence Company (отдельная рота химической защиты)
  - Separate Repair and Overhaul Battalion (отдельный ремонтно-восстановительный батальон)
  - Separate Medical Battalion (отдельный медицинский батальон)
  - Separate Material Supply Battalion (отдельный батальон материального обеспечения)
- 69th Deep Reserve Tank Division [cadred] (69-я запасная танковая дивизия кадра) – Ust-Kamenogorsk
- 10th Fortified Area (10-й Укреплённый район) – Horgos

==== 17th Army Corps ====
17th Army Corps (17-й армейский корпус) (after the disintegration of the USSR the remnants of the corps became the foundation for the Armed Forces of the Kyrgyz Republic)

Corps Command and Headquarters (Управление корпуса и штаб) – Frunze

- 789th Separate Staff Security and Support Company (789-я отдельная рота охраны и обеспечения) – Frunze
- 525th Separate SpetsNaz Company (525-я отдельная рота спецназа) – Frunze (GRU formation operationally attached to the army)
- Separate Electronic Warfare Battalion (отдельный батальон РЭБ) – Sary-Ozek (EW Directorate of the General Staff's (Управление РЭБ ГШ СССР) unit
- 342nd Separate Signals Battalion (342-й отдельный батальон связи) – Frunze
- 303rd Separate Helicopter Squadron (303-я отдельная вертолётная эскадрилья) – Dushanbe
- 30th Separate Motor Rifle Regiment (30-й отдельный мотострелковый полк) – Rybachye (became part of the 8th MRD on August 24, 1989)
- 78th Ballistic Missile Brigade (78-я ракетная бригада) – Ungurtas
- 13th Gun Artillery Regiment (13-й пушечный артиллерийский полк) – Sary-Ozek
- 179th Separate Multiple Rocket Launcher Artillery Battalion (179-й отдельный реактивный артиллерийский дивизион) – Sary-Ozek
- 186th Separate Air Defence Missile and Artillery Battalion (186-й отдельный зенитный ракетно-артиллерийский дивизион) – Osh
- 751st Separate Sapper Engineer Battalion (751-й отдельный инженерно-сапёрный батальон) – Kapchagay
- 78th Material Supply Brigade (78-я бригада материального обеспечения) – Frunze
- Separate Pack Animals Transport Company (отдельная вьючно-транспортная рота) – Osh
- 8th Guards Rezhitskaya, awarded the Order of Lenin, the Order of the Red Banner and the Order of Suvorov, named after the Hero of the Soviet Union Major-General I. V. Panfilov (8-я гвардейская мотострелковая Режицкая ордена Ленина, Краснознамённая, ордена Суворова дивизия имени Героя Советского Союза генерал-майора И. В. Панфилова) – Frunze
  - 41st Separate Guards Signal Battalion (41-й отдельный гвардейский батальон связи) – Rybachye
  - 282nd Guards Motor Rifle Regiment (282-й гвардейский мотострелковый полк) – Frunze
  - 4th Motor Rifle Regiment (4-й мотострелковый полк) – Rybachye
  - 23rd Guards Motor Rifle Regiment (23-й гвардейский мотострелковый полк) – Korday
  - 50th Guards Tank Regiment (50-й гвардейский танковый полк) – Korday
  - 14th Guards Artillery Regiment (14-й гвардейский артиллерийский полк) – Rybachye
  - 1059th Guards Air Defence Missile Regiment (1059-й гвардейский зенитно-ракетный полк) – Korday
  - Separate Ballistic Missile Battalion (отдельный ракетный дивизион) – Rybachye
  - Separate Anti-Tank Battalion (отдельный противотанковый дивизион) – Rybachye
  - 793rd Separate Reconnaissance Battalion (793-й отдельный разведывательный батальон) – Rybachye
  - 32nd Separate Guards Sapper Engineer Battalion (32-й отдельный гвардейский инженерно-сапёрный батальон) – Rybachye
  - Separate Chemical Defence Company (отдельный рота химической защиты) – Rybachye
  - 300th Separate Repair and Overhaul Battalion (300-й отдельный ремонтно-восстановительный батальон) – Korday
  - Separate Medical Battalion (отдельный медицинский батальон) – Rybachye
  - Separate Material Supply Battalion (отдельный батальон материального обеспечения) – Rybachye
- 68th Red Banner Novgorodskaya Motor Rifle Division (68-я мотострелковая Новгородская Краснознамённая дивизия) – Sary-Ozek
  - 549th Separate Signals Battalion (549-й отдельный батальон связи) – Sary-Ozek
  - 188th Motor Rifle Regiment (188-й мотострелковый полк) – Sary-Ozek
  - 385th Motor Rifle Regiment (385-й мотострелковый полк) – Burunday
  - 517th Motor Rifle Regiment (517-й мотострелковый полк) – Taldıqorğan
  - 310th Tank Regiment (310-й танковый полк) – Sary-Ozek
  - 343rd Artillery Regiment (343-й артиллерийский полк) – Sary-Ozek
  - 1164th Air Defence Artillery Regiment (1164-й зенитный артиллерийский полк) – Sary-Ozek
  - Separate Ballistic Missile Battalion (отдельный ракетный дивизион) – Sary-Ozek
  - Separate Anti-Tank Battalion (отдельный противотанковый дивизион) – Sary-Ozek
  - 106th Separate Reconnaissance Battalion (106-й отдельный разведывательный батальон) – Burunday
  - 227th Separate Sapper Engineer Battalion (227-й отдельный инженерно-сапёрный батальон) – Sary-Ozek
  - 81st Separate Chemical Defence Battalion (81-й отдельный батальон химзащиты) – Sary-Ozek
  - Separate Repair and Overhaul Battalion (отдельный ремонтно-восстановительный батальон) – Sary-Ozek
  - 8th Separate Medical Battalion (8-й отдельный медицинский батальон) – Sary-Ozek
  - 395th Separate Material Supply Battalion (395-й отдельный батальон материального обеспечения) – Sary-Ozek
- 134th Motor Rifle Division (134-я мотострелковая дивизия) – Dushanbe
  - Separate Signals Battalion (отдельный батальон связи) – Dushanbe
  - 92nd Motor Rifle Regiment (92-й мотострелковый полк) – Dushanbe
  - 806th Motor Rifle Regiment (806-й мотострелковый полк) – Bokhtar
  - 1208th Motor Rifle Regiment (1208-й мотострелковый полк) – Kulob
  - 401st Tank Regiment (401-й танковый полк) – Dushanbe
  - Artillery Regiment (артиллерийский полк) – Dushanbe
  - 990th Air Defence Artillery Regiment (990-й зенитный артиллерийский полк) – Dushanbe
  - Separate Ballistic Missile Battalion (837-й отдельный ракетный дивизион) – Bokhtar
  - Separate Anti-Tank Battalion (отдельный противотанковый дивизион) – Dushanbe
  - Separate Reconnaissance Battalion (отдельный разведывательный батальон) – Dushanbe
  - Separate Sapper Engineer Battalion (отдельный инженерно-сапёрный батальон) – Dushanbe
  - Separate Chemical Defence Company (отдельная рота химической защиты) – Dushanbe
  - Separate Repair and Overhaul Battalion (отдельный ремонтно-восстановительный батальон) – Dushanbe
  - Separate Medical Battalion (отдельный медицинский батальон) – Dushanbe
  - Separate Material Supply Battalion (отдельный батальон материального обеспечения) – Dushanbe
- 68th Separate Motor Rifle Brigade (mountain) (68-я отдельная мотострелковая бригада (горная)) – Osh (the sole mountain infantry formation in the Soviet Army)

=== Air Forces of the Central Asian Military District ===
By Order of the Ministry of Defence of the Soviet Union (Приказ МО СССР) dating from January 5, 1980 and calling for an increased co-operation between the land and air forces by bringing them together "under common banners" (свести "под одни знамена" ВВС и сухопутные войска с целью повышения их взаимодействия) the tactical air forces have effectively become army aviation in their entirety and the previous commanders of the air armies becoming deputy military district commanders in charge of aviation. Correspondingly the 73rd Air Army was transformed into the Air Forces of the Central Asian Military District. This military reform was reversed as counter-productive and in May 1988 the AF CASM were reverted to the 73rd Air Army. It consisted of:

73rd Air Army (73-я воздушная армия) – Alma Ata

- 87th Separate Signals and Automatised Command and Control Systems Regiment (87-й отдельный полк связи и автоматизированных систем управления) – Alma Ata
- 457th Separate Composite Aviation Regiment (457-й отдельный смешанный авиационный полк) – Tu-134, Il-20/22, An-12 An-72, An-26, An-24, An-30, Mi-8 – Alma Ata
- 24th Aviation Division of Fighter-Bombers (24-я авиационная дивизия истребителей-бомбардировщиков) – Taldıqorğan
  - 129th Aviation Regiment of Fighter-Bombers (129-й авиационный полк истребителей-бомбардировщиков) – Taldıqorğan – MiG-27/MiG-23UB
  - 134th Aviation Regiment of Fighter-Bombers (134-й авиационный полк истребителей-бомбардировщиков) – Zhangiztobe – MiG-27/MiG-23UB
- 905th Separate Fighter Aviation Regiment (905-й отдельный истребительный авиационный полк) – Taldıqorğan – MiG-23MLD (according to some sources there was also a detachment from Maryy-1 aggressor training 1521st Air Base at Taldıqorğan, flying MiG-23s and used for combat air maneuver training)
- 149th Separate Guards Red Banner Bomber Aviation Regiment (149-й отдельный гвардейский бомбардировочный Краснознаменный авиационный полк) – Nikolayevka (Alma Ata) – Su-24
- 39th Separate Nikopolskiy, awarded the Order of Alexander Nevsky Reconnaissance Aviation Regiment (39-й отдельный разведывательный Никопольский ордена Александра Невского авиационный полк) – Balkhash – MiG-25RB, Su-24MR
- 381st Separate Reconnaissance Aviation Regiment (381-й отдельный разведывательный авиационный полк) – Shymkent – Su-17MR
- 154th Separate Helicopter Squadron of the Air Force's Search and Rescue Service (154-я отдельная вертолётная эскадрилья поисково-спасательной службый ВВС) – Karaganda – Mi-6, Mi-8
- 82nd Separate Helicopter Search and Rescue Flight (82-й отдельный вертолётный поисково-спасательный отряд) – Aralsk - Ми-8 Ми-9 Ми-14 Ми-6 (could belong to the aviation of GUKOS)
- Separate Search and Rescue Aviation Flight (отдельный поисково-спасательный авиационный отряд) – Fort-Shevchenko – Mi-14, Mi-8
- Separate Aerostat Squadron (отдельная воздухоплавательная эскадрилья) – Balkhash – meteorological aerostats

== District commanders ==
- 1926–1928 — Konstantin Avksentevsky
- 1928–1933 — Pavel Dybenko
- 1933–1937 — Komkor Mikhail Velikanov
- 1937 — Komkor Ivan Gryaznov
- 1937 — Komandarm 2nd rank Aleksandr Loktionov
- 1937–1938 — Komkor Leonid Petrovsky
- 1938–1941 — Komkor Iosif Apanasenko
- 1941 — General Major Sergei Trofimenko,
- 1941 — June 1944 — Lieutenant General Pavel Kurbatkin
- Jul 1944 – May 1945 — (Acting) Major General Macarius Lipatov
- 24 Jun 1969 – 23 Nov 1977 – General of the Army Nikolay Grigorevich Lyashchenko
- 24 Nov 1977 – 26 Nov 1980 – General Colonel Pyotr Georgievich Lushev
- 27 Nov 1980 – 26 Jun 1984 General Colonel Dmitri Yazov
- 27 Jun 1984 – 21 Jan 1987 – Colonel-General Vladimir Nikolaevich Lobov
- 22 Jan 1987 – 5 Jan 1989 – Colonel-General Aleksandr Vasilevich Kovtunov

== Literature ==
- Military Encyclopedic Dictionary (Военный энциклопедический словарь), Moscow, 1984, 2002.
- Feskov, V.I.; Kalashnikov, K.A; Golikov, V.I.; Slugin, S.A. (2013). The Armed Forces of the USSR after World War II, from the Red Army to the Soviet (Part 1: Land Forces). (В.И. Слугин С.А. Вооруженные силы СССР после Второй Мировой войны: от Красной Армии к Советской (часть 1: Сухопутные войска)). Томск.
