= 1963 October Revolution Parade =

The 1963 October Revolution Parade was a parade on Red Square in Moscow on November 7, 1963, for the 46th anniversary of the October Revolution. Inspecting the parade was Marshal of the Soviet Union Rodion Malinovsky and commanding the parade was the commander of the Moscow Military District, Afanasy Beloborodov. The massed bands of the Military Band Service of the Armed Forces of the Soviet Union led by Major General Nikolai Nazarov was playing the military marches. The parade officially began at the chimes of the Kremlin Clock at 10:00. It has one of the earliest records of the full parade.

== Music ==
Providing the ceremonial music for the parade was the massed bands of the Moscow Military District, under the overall direction of Major General Nikolay Nazarov.

Inspection and address

- Jubilee Slow March "25 Years of the Red Army" (Юбилейный встречный марш "25 лет РККА) by Semyon Tchernetsky
- Slow March of the Tankmen (Встречный Марш Танкистов) by Semyon Tchernetsky
- Slow March of the Tankmen (Встречный Марш Танкистов) by Semyon Tchernetsky
- Slow March of the Guards of the Navy (Гвардейский Встречный Марш Военно-Морского Флота) by Nikolay Ivanov-Radkevich
- Jubilee Slow March "25 Years of the Red Army" (Юбилейный встречный марш "25 лет РККА) by Semyon Tchernetsky
- Slow March (Встречный Марш) by Dmitriy Pertsev
- Slow March (Встречный Марш) by Dmitriy Pertsev
- Slow March (Встречный Марш) by Viktor Runov
- Slow March Victory (Встречный Марш «Победа») by Yuriy Griboyedov
- Slow March (Встречный Марш) by Viktor Runov
- Jubilee Slow March "25 Years of the Red Army" (Юбилейный встречный марш "25 лет РККА) by Semyon Tchernetsky
- Jubilee Slow March "25 Years of the Red Army" (Юбилейный встречный марш "25 лет РККА) by Semyon Tchernetsky
- Slow March of the Guards of the Navy (Гвардейский Встречный Марш Военно-Морского Флота) by Nikolay Ivanov-Radkevich
- Slow March of the Guards of the Navy (Гвардейский Встречный Марш Военно-Морского Флота) by Nikolay Ivanov-Radkevich
- Slav'sya (Славься) by Mikhail Glinka
- Signal Everyone, listen! (Сигнал «Слушайте все!»)
- State Anthem of the Soviet Union (Государственный Гимн Советского Союза) by Aleksandr Aleksandrov
- Fanfare (Фанфара)

Infantry Column

- Wide Is My Motherland (Широка страна моя родная) by Vasiliy Lebedev-Kumach
- In Defense of the Motherland (В защиту Родины) by Viktor Runov
- Comrades, we bravely march! ("Смело, товарищи, в ногу!") by Leonid Radin
- Warszawianka ("Варшавянка") by Józef Pławiński
- The Red Army is the Strongest ("Красная Армия всех сильней") by Samuel Pokrass
- Kakhovka ("Каховке") by Isaak Dunayevskiy
- Air March (Авиамарш) by Yuliy Khait
- I Believe, My Friends (“Я верю, друзья”) by Oskar Fel'tsman
- March Naval Guards (Марш «Морская гвардия») by Yuriy Mulyutin
- Let's Go! ("В путь") by Vasiliy Solovyov-Sedoy
- March of the Border Guards ("Марш пограничных войск") by Vano Slova
- March of the Nakhimov Naval Cadets (“Марш нахимовцев”) by Vasiliy Solovyov-Sedoy

Mobile Column and Conclusion of the Military Segment

- Salute to Moscow (Салют Москвы) by Semyon Tchernetsky
- March of the Tankmen (Марш Танкистов) by Semyon Tchernetsky
- Metropolitan March (“Марш "Столичный”) by Viktor Runov
