= 1918 May 1 Parade =

The 1918 May 1 Parade (Russian: Парад 1 мая 1918 года) was a military parade of the Moscow Garrison on 1 May 1918 on Khodynka Field. It was the first parade of the recently established Red Army and the first military parade held in modern Russia. As of 2019, the parade is the only one of its kind to not have been held on Red Square. The parade was attended by the Chairman of the Council of People's Commissars of the Russian SFSR Vladimir Lenin, his spouse Nadezhda Krupskaya and his sister Maria Ilyinichna Ulyanova. The site of Khodynka was chosen due to the holiday of International Workers' Day and its status as a peaceful holiday rather than a military one. Musical accompaniment was provided by the Massed Military Bands led by Lyudomir Petkevich.

The ceremonies began at 10:00 AM (MSK) with the performance of The Internationale, the then Soviet anthem. British diplomat and Unofficial Ambassador to the Bolsheviks R. H. Bruce Lockhart described the mood during the parade as "May was excited and feverish". Immediately after the parade, a demonstration of workers took place on Moscow's Red Square, where a temporary tribune was erected in what is now Lenin's Mausoleum.

== See also ==
- International Workers' Day
