= Vladimir Arkhipov =

Soviet union army general (1933–2004)

Vladimir Arkhipov Владимир Архипов
- Born: Vladimir Mikhailovich Arkhipov; 1 July 1933; Aktobe Region, Kazakh SSR, Soviet Union
- Died: 27 October 2004 (aged 71) Moscow, Russia
- Allegiance: Soviet Union
- Branch: Soviet Army
- Service years: 1952–1991
- Rank: General of the Army
- Commands: Transcaucasian Military District; Moscow Military District; Rear of the Armed Forces of the Russian Federation

Vladimir Mikhailovich Arkhipov (Russian: Владимир Миха́йлович Архи́пов; 1 June 1933 – 27 October 2004) was a Soviet army general and politician who formerly served as Commander of the Rear of the Armed Forces of the Soviet Union.

== Early career ==
He came from a family of railway workers and was Russian by nationality. He graduated from Secondary School No. 59 in 1949. That same year, he began working as an apprentice turner and later as a turner at the diesel locomotive depot at Chelkar Station on the Aktyubinsk section of the railway.

In 1952, he was drafted into the Soviet Army.

He graduated from the Tashkent Higher Tank Command School in 1955. Starting in 1955, he held a series of command positions within the 224th Guards Tank Regiment of the 37th Guards Tank Division. He began as a tank platoon commander, became a company commander in 1958, served as deputy commander of a tank battalion from 1960, and was appointed commander of a tank battalion of the 6th Guards Tank Army in the Kiev Military District, serving from 1962 to 1964. During this time, he became a member of the Communist Party of the Soviet Union

In 1966 he graduated from the Malinovsky Military Armored Forces Academy with a gold medal. From 1966 he was deputy commander, and from 1967 - commander of the 155th tank regiment of the 20th tank division in the Northern Group of Forces. In 1968 he took part in the operation to introduce troops into the territory of Czechoslovakia. From 1970 to 1972, he was deputy commander of the 56th Rifle Division.

== Military service ==
In 1972, he graduated from the Military Academy of the General Staff. After graduating from the academy, he commanded the 4th Guards Kantemir Tank Division, which garrisoned Moscow. In April 1974 he became the commander of the 32nd Army Corps. In July 1975, Arkhipov was transferred to commander of the 20th Guards Army, stationed in East Germany as part of the Group of Soviet Forces in Germany.

In 1979 he was appointed chief of staff of the Central Asian Military District. In August 1983 he became the commander of the Transcaucasus Military District. In July 1985, Arkhipov was transferred to the Moscow Military District. On May 4, 1988, he was appointed Deputy Minister of Defense of the USSR and promoted to the rank of General of the army. From May 4, 1988, he served as Deputy Minister of Defense of the USSR and Chief of Logistics of the Armed Forces of the USSR. In this role, his most notable contributions included organizing the logistical support for the response to the 1988 Armenian earthquake in December 1988 and coordinating the Soviet withdrawal from Afghanistan. By decree of President Mikhail Gorbachev on December 7, 1991, he was relieved of his duties and retired later that month. He was a member of the Central Committee of the Communist Party of the Soviet Union from 1986 to 1990 and served as a deputy of the Soviet of Nationalities from 1984–1989, representing the Abkhaz Autonomous Soviet Socialist Republic.

== Later life and death ==
He lived in Moscow for the rest of his career. From 1999 to 2004, he was chaired the Russian Armed Forces Logistics of the Veterans' Council. Arkhipov died on October 27, 2004. He was buried in Moscow at the Novodevichy Cemetery.

== Awards ==
- Order of the October Revolution
- Order of Red Banner
- Order of the Red Star
- Order "For Service to the Homeland in the Armed Forces of the USSR"
- Jubilee Medal "In Commemoration of the 100th Anniversary of the Birth of Vladimir Ilyich Lenin"
- Medal "For Distinction in Guarding the State Border of the USSR"
- Medal "For Courage in a Fire"
- Jubilee Medal "Twenty Years of Victory in the Great Patriotic War 1941–1945"
- Medal "Veteran of the Armed Forces of the USSR"
- Medal "For Strengthening of Brotherhood in Arms"
- Jubilee Medal "40 Years of the Armed Forces of the USSR"
- Jubilee Medal "50 Years of the Armed Forces of the USSR"
- Jubilee Medal "60 Years of the Armed Forces of the USSR"
- Jubilee Medal "70 years of the Armed Forces of the USSR"
- Medal "In commemoration of the 850th anniversary of Moscow" (Russian Federation)
- Order "For Merit" in gold (German Democratic Republic)
- Medal Brotherhood in Arms (German Democratic Republic)
