= Yevgeny Ivanovsky =

Yevgeny Filippovich Ivanovsky Евгений Филиппович Ивановский
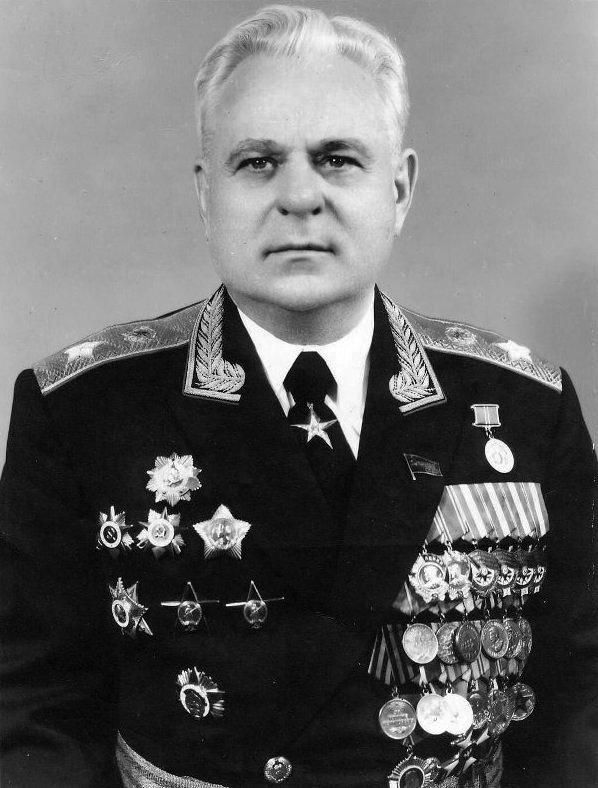
- Born: 7 March 1918; Chereya, Vitebsk Region, Belarus
- Died: 22 November 1991 (aged 73) Moscow, Russian SFSR, Soviet Union
- Allegiance: Soviet Union
- Branch: Soviet Army; Armoured Troops
- Service years: 1936–1991
- Rank: General of the Army
- Commands: Moscow Military District; Group of Soviet Forces in Germany; Belorussian Military District; Soviet Ground Forces
- Conflicts: World War II; Invasion of Poland; Winter War; Eastern Front
- Awards: Hero of the Soviet Union; Order of Lenin (3); Order of the Red Banner (4); Order of Kutuzov 1st class; Order of Suvorov, 3rd class; Order of the Patriotic War, 1st class (2); Order of the Patriotic War, 2nd class; Order of the Red Star (2); Order for Service to the Homeland in the Armed Forces of the USSR, 3rd class

Yevgeny Filippovich Ivanovsky (Russian: Евгений Филиппович Ивановский; 7 March 1918 – 22 November 1991) was a Soviet Army General who served in numerous high commands following the Second World War, including the command of the Moscow Military District from 1968 to 1972, command of the Group of Soviet Forces in Germany from 20 July 1972 to 25 November 1980.

On 3 November 1972, following the decision of the Supreme Soviet of the USSR, he was promoted to the rank of the Army General. His next command was Belorussian Military District from December 1980 to February 1985, when he was promoted to the position of the Commander in Chief of the Soviet Ground Forces. In 1989 he became the member of the inspectorate of the Ministry of the Defense of the USSR.

In the years 1971–1989 he was a member of the Central Committee of the Communist Party of the Soviet Union. He also served 3 terms as a deputy in the Supreme Soviet of the USSR.

Ivanovsky spent his last years living in Moscow, where he died on 22 November 1991. He was buried at Novodevichy Cemetery.

He has published a memoir.
