= Dmitry Yazov =

Soviet minister of defence (1924–2020)

Marshal of the Soviet Union Dmitry Yazov
- Дмитрий Язов
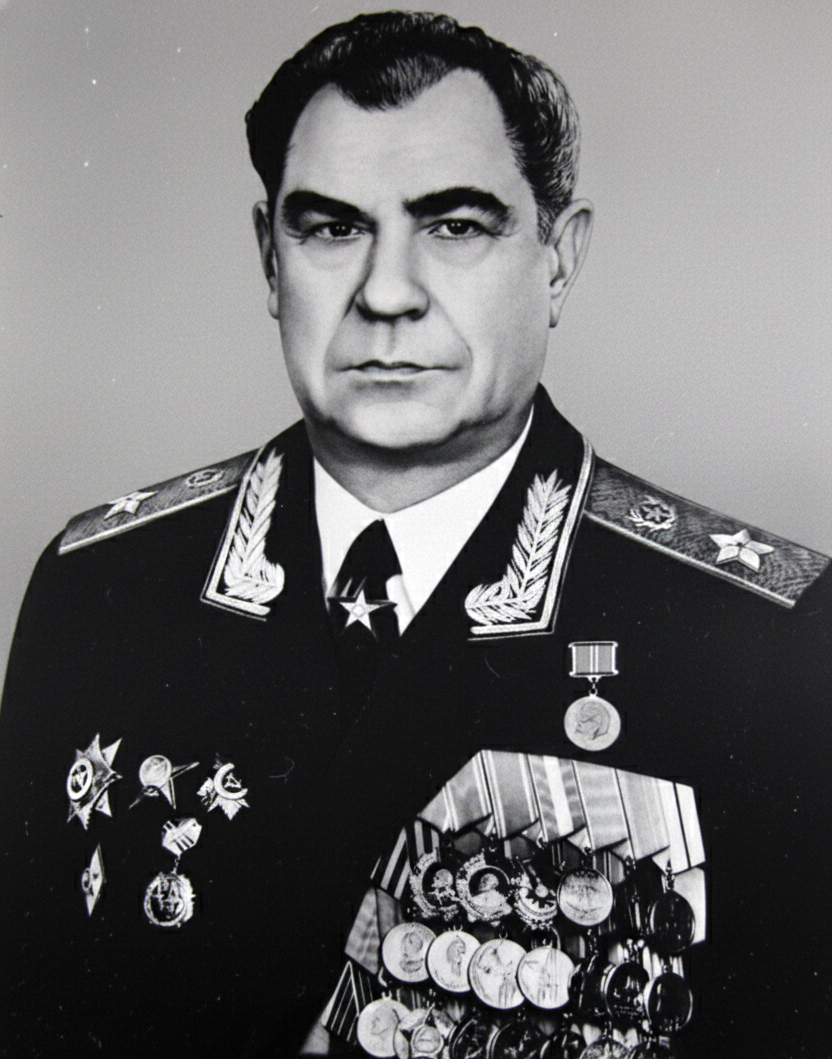
- Yazov, c. 1980s

Minister of Defence
- In office 30 May 1987 – 28 August 1991
- Premier: Nikolai Ryzhkov; Valentin Pavlov
- Preceded by: Sergei Sokolov
- Succeeded by: Yevgeny Shaposhnikov

Personal details
- Born: Dmitry Timofeyevich Yazov; 8 November 1924 Yazovo, Russian SFSR, Soviet Union
- Died: 25 February 2020 (aged 95) Moscow, Russia
- Resting place: Federal Military Memorial Cemetery, Moscow Oblast
- Party: Communist Party of the Soviet Union (1944–1991)

Military service
- Allegiance: Soviet Union; Russia
- Branch/service: Soviet Army; Russian Ground Forces
- Years of service: 1941–1991
- Rank: Marshal of the Soviet Union
- Battles/wars: World War II; Leningrad Front; Volkhov Front; Siege of Leningrad; Courland Pocket; Cuban Missile Crisis; Soviet–Afghan War; Black January; January Events; August Coup

Dmitry Timofeyevich Yazov (Russian: Дми́трий Тимофе́евич Я́зов; 8 November 1924 – 25 February 2020) was a Marshal of the Soviet Union. A veteran of the Great Patriotic War, Yazov served as Minister of Defence from 1987 until he was arrested for his part in the 1991 August coup, four months before the fall of the Soviet Union. Yazov was the last person to be appointed to the rank of Marshal of the Soviet Union on 28 April 1990 and the only Marshal born in Siberia. At the time of his death on 25 February 2020, he was the last living Marshal of the Soviet Union.

== Early life ==
Yazov was born on 8 November 1924 into a peasant family in the village of Yazovo, in what is now Omsk Oblast. Some Soviet-era sources gave his year of birth as 1923.

== Military career ==
=== Second World War ===
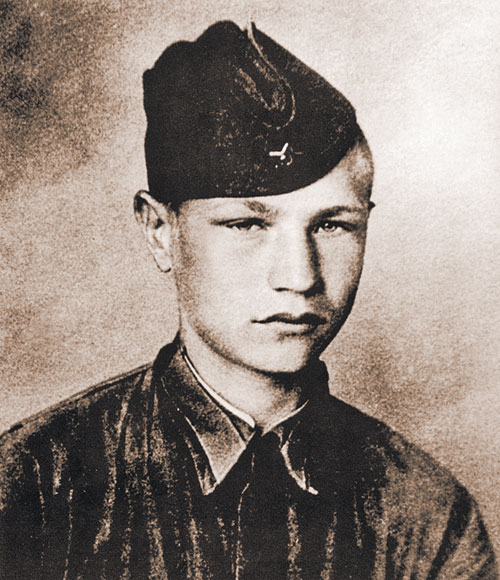
Yazov in 1941

In November 1941, at the age of 17, Yazov volunteered for the Red Army. He graduated in 1942 from the Moscow military school named after the Supreme Soviet of the RSFSR, now the Moscow Higher Combined Arms Command School. He then served as a rifle platoon and company commander on the Volkhov and Leningrad fronts. He fought in the defence of Leningrad, the Baltic offensive and the blockade of the Courland Pocket, and he was wounded twice. He received the Order of the Red Star during the war, and he joined the Communist Party of the Soviet Union in 1944.

=== Post-war career ===
After the war, Yazov decided to make the army his career. He received his school-leaving certificate only in 1953, when he was already a major. In 1956, he graduated with a gold medal from the Frunze Military Academy. He took command of a motor rifle regiment in 1961.

In 1962, Yazov commanded Soviet ground forces in Oriente Province, Cuba, during the Cuban Missile Crisis, where he personally worked with Cuban Defence Minister Raúl Castro. The unit, which was headquartered at Holguín Air Base, was ordered to attack Guantanamo Bay Naval Base with KS-1 Komet nuclear cruise missiles if war with the United States started. Historian Raymond L. Garthoff wrote that Yazov was one of the four Soviet regimental commanders in Cuba during the crisis, and that his regiment was the one chosen to remain when the others were withdrawn in 1963.

Yazov later commanded a division from 1967, a corps from 1971 and an army from 1973. In 1976, he became first deputy commander of the Far Eastern Military District. He commanded the Central Group of Forces in Czechoslovakia from 1979, and the Central Asian Military District from 1980. From 1984 to 1986, he commanded the Far Eastern Military District, where he had a reputation as a strict disciplinarian.

=== Minister of Defence ===
According to Time, Yazov is believed to have made a favourable impression on Mikhail Gorbachev during the Soviet leader's visit to Vladivostok in the summer of 1986. Gorbachev then brought him to Moscow as deputy minister of defence for personnel, a post he held for about six months. After the West German pilot Mathias Rust landed a light aircraft near Red Square, Marshal Sergei Sokolov left the post of defence minister. Yazov, a relatively junior commander who had leapfrogged many senior officers, was appointed in his place on 30 May. He was then 63, and 13 years younger than his predecessor. He also became a candidate member of the Politburo.

Yazov oversaw the withdrawal of Soviet troops from Afghanistan in 1988 and 1989. He was confirmed as minister by the Supreme Soviet in July 1989, and he was made a Marshal of the Soviet Union on 28 April 1990. Although he was seen as a reformer when he was appointed, he came to be regarded as a conservative critic of liberalisation, angered by press criticism of the army.

In January 1990, Soviet troops entered Baku, killing more than 200 people, in what became known as Black January. Yazov said that the army had come "to destroy the political structure of the Popular Front to prevent their victory in the upcoming elections". In November 1990, at a meeting with Gorbachev, he called for an end to "the revival of nationalism and extremism". In January 1991, the Defence Ministry ordered troops to the Baltic republics and other rebellious republics to enforce conscription. On 13 January, during the January Events in Vilnius, Soviet troops stormed the television tower, and 14 people were killed. In June 1991, Yazov was one of three leaders who demanded a state of emergency at a session of the Supreme Soviet, a demand that Gorbachev rejected. In a closed session of the Supreme Soviet that month, he condemned perestroika.

=== August 1991 coup ===
Yazov was one of the leading conspirators of the August 1991 coup attempt. According to early reports, he attended a meeting of the conspirators in Moscow hours before the coup began. A coded directive signed by Yazov at 4:30 a.m. on 19 August put the armed forces on alert. As a member of the State Committee on the State of Emergency, Yazov ordered tanks and other heavy equipment into Moscow. On 20 August, there were rumours that he had resigned from the committee for health reasons, but these were denied. Boris Yeltsin declared all orders signed by Yazov invalid.

On 21 August, after civilians were killed near the White House, Yazov ordered the troops to withdraw. According to the memoirs of Ruslan Khasbulatov, he said, "I brewed this mess, so I will clean it up." He then flew to Foros to see Gorbachev, and on his return he was arrested at Vnukovo-2 airport on the night of 22 August. After his arrest, a video was broadcast in which he called himself an "old fool" and apologised to Gorbachev. He told Russian television, "I very much regret what happened." In his later memoirs, he insisted that the events had not been a coup, and he said that he had recorded the video appeal under pressure.

Yazov was charged with treason and held in Matrosskaya Tishina prison. He was released on 26 January 1993 with the other members of the committee, and he was amnestied by the State Duma on 23 February 1994. He was discharged from military service in 1994.

== Later life ==
From 1998, Yazov was chief military adviser in the Defence Ministry's Main Directorate of International Military Cooperation, and he also worked at the General Staff Academy. In 2008, he became a general inspector in the ministry's Service of General Inspectors. In November 2004, President Vladimir Putin decorated him for "high achievements in useful, societal activities". On his 90th birthday in November 2014, Putin presented him with the Order of Alexander Nevsky and an engraved watch. Yazov publicly defended Joseph Stalin, and in 2016 his book Victorious Stalin was published in Russia. On 4 February 2020, defence minister Sergei Shoigu presented him with the Order "For Merit to the Fatherland", third class.

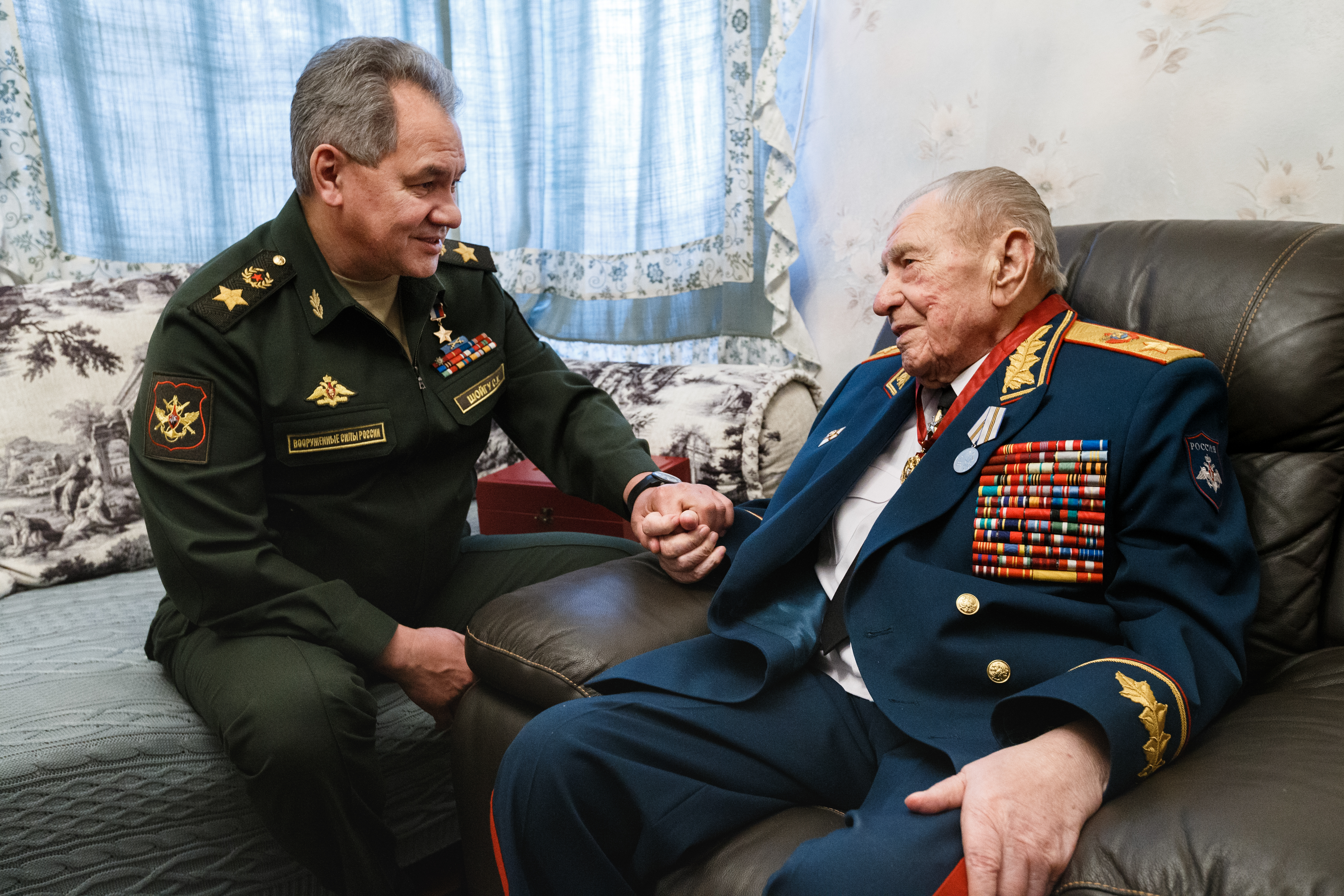
Yazov (right) and Sergei Shoigu on 4 February 2020

On 27 March 2019, a court in Vilnius convicted Yazov in absentia of war crimes and crimes against humanity over the January 1991 events, and sentenced him to ten years in prison. He was the most senior of the 67 people convicted in the case. Russia refused to cooperate with the trial, calling it illegal, and refused to extradite him. In April 2019, Russia's Investigative Committee opened a case against four of the Lithuanian judges for "delivering a deliberately wrongful sentence".

== Death ==
Yazov died in Moscow on 25 February 2020, at the age of 95, after a long illness. Putin called him "an outstanding military commander". He was buried with military honours at the Federal Military Memorial Cemetery on 27 February, in a ceremony attended by Shoigu and about 1,500 people. In 2022, the Omsk city council named a new street after him.

== Assessment ==
In his book The Collapse of the Soviet Military, William Odom repeats Alexander Yakovlev's description of Yazov as a "mediocre officer", "fit to command a division but nothing higher". Odom suggests that Gorbachev was only looking for "careerists who would follow orders, any orders".

Yazov appears as a character in Tom Clancy's novel The Cardinal of the Kremlin.

== Awards and honors ==
=== Soviet Union ===
- Order of Lenin, twice
- Order of the October Revolution
- Order of the Red Banner
- Order of the Patriotic War, 1st class
- Order of the Red Star
- Order "For Service to the Homeland in the Armed Forces of the USSR", 3rd class
- Medal "For Battle Merit"
- Medal "For Impeccable Service", 1st and 2nd classes
- Medal "For Distinction in Guarding the State Border of the USSR"
- Medal "Veteran of the Armed Forces of the USSR"
- Medal "For Strengthening Military Cooperation"
- Medal "For the Development of Virgin Lands"
- Medal "For the Defence of Leningrad"
- Jubilee medals

=== Russian Federation ===
- Order "For Merit to the Fatherland", 3rd and 4th class
- Order of Honour
- Order of Alexander Nevsky
- Jubilee medals

=== Foreign ===
- Order of the Red Banner (Afghanistan)
- Order of "Friendship of Peoples" (Afghanistan)
- Medal "For the strengthening of friendship in Arms" (Bulgaria)
- Order of Che Guevara (Cuba)
- Order of Red Banner (Czechoslovakia)
- Scharnhorst Order (East Germany)
- Medal "20 years of independence of the Republic of Kazakhstan"
- Medal "30 years of Victory over Japan" (Mongolia)
- Medal "40 years of Khalkhin Gol Victory" (Mongolia)
- Medal "50 Years of the Mongolian People's Revolution" (Mongolia)
- Order of Civil Merit, 1st class (Syria)

=== Religious ===
- Order of St. Grand Prince Dmitry Donskoy (Russian Orthodox Church)

Political offices
Preceded by Sergei Sokolov	Minister of Defence of the Soviet Union; 1987–1991	Succeeded by Yevgeny Shaposhnikov
