= Vladimir Govorov =

Soviet army general (1924–2006)

Vladimir Govorov Владимир Говоров
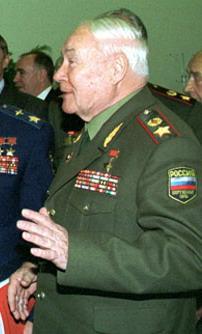
- Govorov in 2002
- Born: Vladimir Leonidovich Govorov; 18 October 1924; Odessa, Ukrainian SSR, Soviet Union
- Died: 13 August 2006 (aged 81) Moscow, Russia
- Allegiance: Soviet Union
- Branch: Soviet Army
- Service years: 1942–1992
- Rank: General of the Army
- Commands: 2nd Guards Tank Army; Baltic Military District; Moscow Military District
- Conflicts: Great Patriotic War

Vladimir Leonidovich Govorov (Russian: Владимир Леонидович Говоров; 18 October 1924 – 13 August 2006) was a Soviet General and military leader. He was the son of Soviet military commander Marshal Leonid Govorov.

== Early life ==
Vladimir Govorov was born in the Ukrainian Soviet Socialist Republic in 1924 to Leonid Govorov and Lidia Ivanovna. In 1938, Govorov and a school friend decided to travel to Spain to fight for the Spanish Republican Army in the Spanish Civil War. However, they were intercepted on the way and returned home.

== Military service ==
=== Service in World War II ===
In June 1942 he was drafted into the Red Army. In 1942 he graduated from the 2nd Moscow Special Artillery School and a year later, the Ryazan Artillery School. In October 1943, Govorov was sent to the fighting on the fronts of the Great Patriotic War. He commanded a gun platoon, then an artillery battery on the Leningrad and 2nd Baltic front. He participated in the Siege of Leningrad, the offensive operations of the Soviet troops in the Baltic states, as well as the Courland Pocket.

=== Post-war service ===
In 1946, he graduated from an Artillery Officer's High School, immediately becoming the commander of an artillery battalion. By the end of 1949, Govorov graduated from the Frunze Military Academy. That same year, he joined the Communist Party of the Soviet Union. In 1963, he graduated from the Military Academy of the General Staff and served in the Group of Soviet Forces in Germany, serving as chief of staff, and first deputy commander.

==== Command of major formations ====
From 1967–1969, Govorov served the post of commander of the 2nd Guards Tank Army, and in 1971, Govorov commanded the Baltic Military District. From 1972-1980, he served as commander of the Moscow Military District. He became a candidate member of the CPSU in 1976. On 28 October 1977, Govorov was awarded the rank of General of the Army in time for the 60th anniversary of the October Revolution. Being the Moscow Garrison commander, he was able to command nine military parades in honor of October Revolution Day on Red Square. In December 1980, he was appointed commander of the Far Eastern Military District. He was succeeded in the Moscow Garrison by General Petr Lushev. While based in Khabarovsk, he organized Soviet cooperation with the militaries of Vietnam, Cambodia, Laos and Mongolia. As a result of his work, he was appointed to the post of deputy Minister of Defense and Chief Inspector of the Ministry of Defense in June 1984. For his 60th birthday, Govorov was made a Hero of the Soviet Union on 17 October 1984, officially in recognition of his "great contributions in increasing combat readiness, skilled leadership, and personal courage shown in the Great Patriotic War."

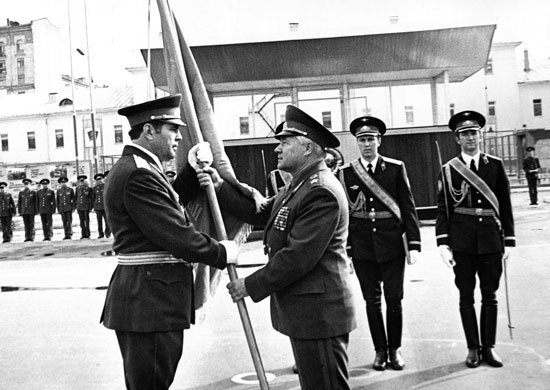
Govorov presenting the banner of the regiment to the commander of 154th Preobrazhensky Independent Commandant's Regiment on 29 June 1980.

==== Civil defense ====
On 11 June 1986, he was appointed as the Head of Civil Defense. In this position, he supervised the elimination of the consequences of the Chernobyl disaster, as well as all natural disasters that occurred in the USSR such as the 1988 Armenian earthquake and the 1989 Gissar earthquake. Under him, a large-scale restructuring of Civil Defense services began, reorienting its activities towards peacetime. Civil Defense became the basis of the Russian Emergencies Ministry, which was subsequently created. On 15 August 1991, Govorov submitted a letter of resignation, being relieved of his post by President Mikhail Gorbachev two days later (just over 24 hours before the August coup occurred), and being dismissed from the Soviet Armed Forces in 1992.

== Later life ==
Govorov did some social work for veterans of the Russian Ground Forces after the fall of the Soviet union in 1990. He has been associated with the Russian Committee of War Veterans and Military Service which he advocated for veteran affairs. He also supervised the preparations for the celebration of the anniversaries of World War II and was a member of the Organizing Committee "Victory". On 9 May 1995, 50 years to the day since the signing of the German Instrument of Surrender, he commanded a parade of veterans on Red Square in the presence of President Boris Yeltsin, Marshal Viktor Kulikov and Prime Minister Viktor Chernomyrdin. He commanded a similar parade held In 2000, which was the last parade in which the veterans marched across Red Square on foot. Govorov died on August 13, 2006, in Moscow after a long illness. He was honored with a funeral ceremony on August 17, and was buried at the Novodevichy Cemetery. A plaque on the building of the Russian Emergencies Ministry in Moscow and plaque on the building of the former headquarters of the Moscow Military District both bear his name.

== Awards ==
=== Titles ===
- Hero of the Soviet Union
- Honorary Citizen of Ulan-Ude

=== Orders ===
- Order of Merit for the Fatherland 3rd class
- Order of Lenin (2)
- Order of the Red Banner (2)
- Order of Friendship
- Order of the Patriotic War 1st and 2nd class
- Order "For Service to the Homeland in the Armed Forces of the USSR" 2nd and 3rd class

=== Medals ===
- Jubilee medal "For Military Valour in Commemoration of the 100th Anniversary since the Birth of Vladimir Il'ich Lenin"
- Medal "For the Defence of Leningrad"
- Medal "For the Victory over Germany in the Great Patriotic War 1941–1945"
- Jubilee Medal "Twenty Years of Victory in the Great Patriotic War 1941–1945"
- Jubilee Medal "Thirty Years of Victory in the Great Patriotic War 1941–1945"
- Jubilee Medal "Forty Years of Victory in the Great Patriotic War 1941–1945"
- Jubilee Medal "30 Years of the Soviet Army and Navy"
- Jubilee Medal "40 Years of the Armed Forces of the USSR"
- Jubilee Medal "50 Years of the Armed Forces of the USSR"
- Jubilee Medal "60 Years of the Armed Forces of the USSR"
- Jubilee Medal "70 Years of the Armed Forces of the USSR"
- Medal "In Commemoration of the 800th Anniversary of Moscow"
