= Russian Empire =

Russian state from 1721 to 1917

Russian Empire Российская империя
- 1721–1917
- Flag (1721–1858, 1896–1917) Coat of arms (1883–1917)
- Motto: Съ Нами Богъ! "God is with us!"
- Anthem: Боже, Царя храни! ("God Save the Tsar!"; 1833–1917)
- Russia in 1914 Lost in 1856–1914; Spheres of influence Protectorates (Note: Principalities of Moldavia and Wallachia in 1829–1856.)
- Capital: Saint Petersburg (Note: In 1914, the city was renamed Petrograd to reflect anti-German sentiments of Russia during World War I.) (1721–1728; 1732–1917); Moscow (Note: The capital was moved back to Moscow by Peter II of Russia following his coronation; this was undone by Anna of Russia.) (1728–1732)
- Largest city: Saint Petersburg
- Official languages: Russian
- Recognized languages: Finnish; French; German; Polish; Swedish
- Religion (1897): 84.2% Christianity; 69.3% Eastern Orthodox (official); 9.2% Catholic; 5.7% Other Christian; 11.1% Islam; 4.2% Judaism; 0.3% Buddhism; 0.2% Others
- Demonym: Russian
- Government: Unitary absolute monarchy (1721–1906) Unitary semi-constitutional monarchy (1906–1917)
- Emperor
  - 1721–1725 (first): Peter I
  - 1894–1917 (last): Nicholas II
- Head of government
  - 1810–1812 (first): Nikolay Rumyantsev (Note: As Chairman of the Committee of Ministers.)
  - 1917 (last): Nikolai Golitsyn
- Legislature: None (1721–1906); State Duma and State Council (1906–1917)
  - Upper house: State Council
  - Lower house: State Duma
- Historical era: Early modern period; Late modern period
  - Treaty of Nystad: 10 September 1721
  - Proclaimed: 2 November 1721
  - Table of Ranks: 4 February 1722
  - Decembrist revolt: 26 December 1825
  - Emancipation reform: 3 March 1861
  - Sale of Alaska: 18 October 1867
  - 1905 Revolution: Jan 1905 – Jul 1907
  - October Manifesto: 30 October 1905
  - Constitution adopted: 6 May 1906
  - February Revolution: 8–16 March 1917
  - Republic proclaimed: 14 September 1917

Area
- 1725: 15,000,000 km^{2} (5,800,000 sq mi)
- 1895: 22,800,000 km^{2} (8,800,000 sq mi)
- 1906: 22,500,000 km^{2} (8,700,000 sq mi)

Population
  - 1897: 125,640,021
  - 1910: 161,000,000
- Currency: Russian ruble
Preceded by	Succeeded by
Tsardom of Russia	Russian Republic

The Russian Empire (Note: Russian: Российская империя, romanized: Rossiyskaya imperiya; pre-reform spelling: Россійская Имперія; IPA: [rɐˈsʲijskəjə ɪmˈpʲerʲɪjə]; Also known as the All-Russian Empire, Imperial Russia, Tsarist Russia, or simply Russia.) was the final phase of the Russian monarchy. It spanned most of northern Eurasia from its establishment in 1721 until the proclamation of the Russian Republic in 1917. At its height in the late 19th century, it covered approximately 22,800,000 km^{2} (8,800,000 sq mi), roughly one-sixth of the world's landmass, making it the third-largest empire in history, after the British and Mongol empires.

The foundations of the empire were laid by Ivan III (r. 1462–1505), who established a centralized Russian state. His grandson, Ivan IV (r. 1533–1584), was the first Russian monarch to be crowned tsar in 1547. Between 1550 and 1700, Russia grew by an average of 35,000 km^{2} (14,000 sq mi) per year. Peter the Great (r. 1682–1725) transformed the tsardom into an empire and fought wars that turned Russia into a major European power. He moved the capital from Moscow to the newly established city of Saint Petersburg, initiated political reforms, and led a cultural revolution. Catherine the Great (r. 1762–1796) presided over further Russian expansion while continuing Peter's policy of modernization. Alexander I (r. 1801–1825) helped defeat Napoleon during the Napoleonic Wars and established the Holy Alliance, which aimed to restrain the spread of secularism and liberalism across Europe. Although Russia had achieved victories in the Russo-Turkish wars, its defeat in the Crimean War (1853–1856) prompted a period of domestic reform and redirected its expansion toward Central Asia. Alexander II (r. 1855–1881) initiated major reforms, most notably the 1861 emancipation of approximately 23 million serfs. The 19th century also saw major developments in literature, music, and the sciences.

By the start of the 19th century, Russian territory extended from the Arctic Ocean in the north to the Black Sea in the south, and from the Baltic Sea in the west to the Pacific Ocean and Alaska in the east. Russia administered Alaska between 1799 and 1867. Russia also expanded its control over the Caucasus, most of Central Asia, and parts of Northeast Asia. By the 1897 census, the population had reached 126 million, with vast ethnic, linguistic, and socioeconomic diversity. In the late 19th and early 20th centuries, Russia experienced industrial growth and railway construction, though the country remained largely agrarian. Famine, political discontent, and resistance to reform contributed to growing unrest and the rise of revolutionary movements. Following the 1905 Revolution, Nicholas II (r. 1894–1917) authorized the creation of a national parliament, the State Duma, though ultimate political authority remained with him.

Russia entered the First World War in 1914 on the side of the Allies. High casualties, military setbacks, and severe food and fuel shortages in the cities led to widespread discontent with the monarchy. In 1917, mass unrest in Petrograd and army mutinies culminated in the February Revolution, which led to Nicholas II's abdication and the establishment of the Russian Provisional Government. Political instability, continued participation in the unpopular war, and economic disruption resulted in mass demonstrations in July, after which the government proclaimed a republic in September. The Provisional Government was overthrown in the October Revolution by the Bolsheviks. They established a communist state and signed a treaty ending Russia's involvement in the war, but faced opposition from various factions known collectively as the Whites. After emerging victorious in the Russian Civil War, the Bolsheviks established the Soviet Union across most of Russian territory. Russia was one of four continental empires to collapse as a result of World War I, along with Germany, Austria–Hungary, and the Ottoman Empire.

== History ==
From the 10th to 17th century, the Russian lands were dominated by a noble class known as the boyars, above whom stood the grand prince and later the tsar, an absolute monarch. The foundations of a unified Russian state and eventually the Russian Empire were laid in the 15th century under Ivan III. Moscow became the leading Russian principality and came to dominate the region known as Great Russia; by the early 16th century, the remaining Russian states were united with Moscow. The subjects of the Muscovite ruler were overwhelmingly Great Russian in ethnicity and Orthodox in religion. As Moscow was the only independent Orthodox power following the fall of the Byzantine Empire in 1453, its rulers had already taken symbolic steps toward becoming an empire by marrying into the Byzantine imperial dynasty, adopting the double-headed eagle as their symbol, and the title of tsar (caesar).

During the reign of Ivan IV, the khanates of Kazan and Astrakhan were conquered by Russia in the mid-16th century, marking the beginning of the transformation from an almost mono-ethnic realm into a multi-ethnic empire. The Russians began to expand into Siberia, initially in pursuit of the region's profitable furs. Following the Time of Troubles in the early 17th century, the traditional alliance of autocratic monarchy, church, and aristocracy was seen as the only basis for preserving social order and Russian statehood, which legitimized the rule of the Romanov dynasty.

=== Peter the Great (1682–1725) ===
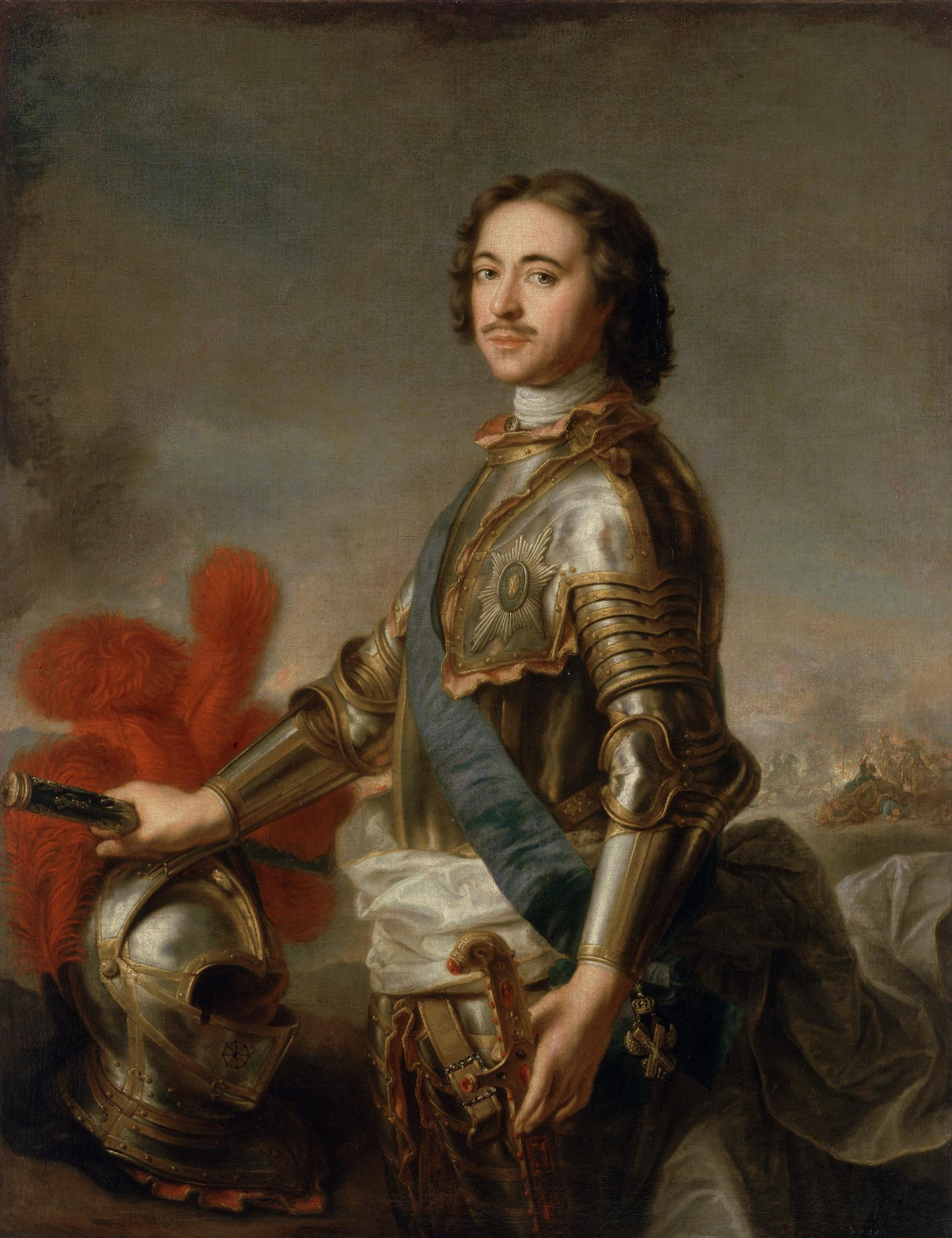
Peter the Great officially proclaimed the Russian Empire in 1721 and became its first emperor. He instituted sweeping reforms and oversaw the transformation of Russia into a major European power. Painting by Jean-Marc Nattier, 1717.

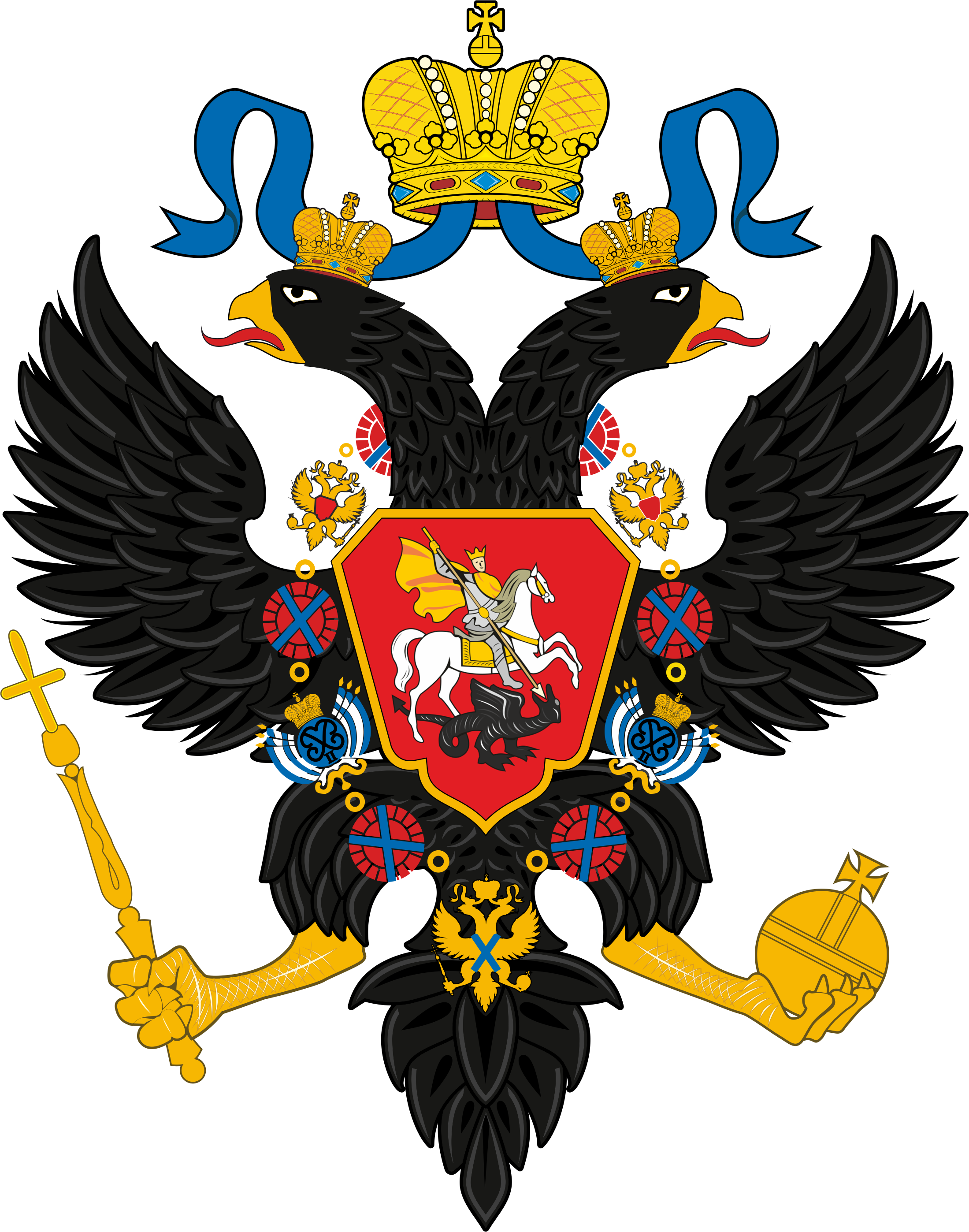
Coat of arms during the reign of Peter I

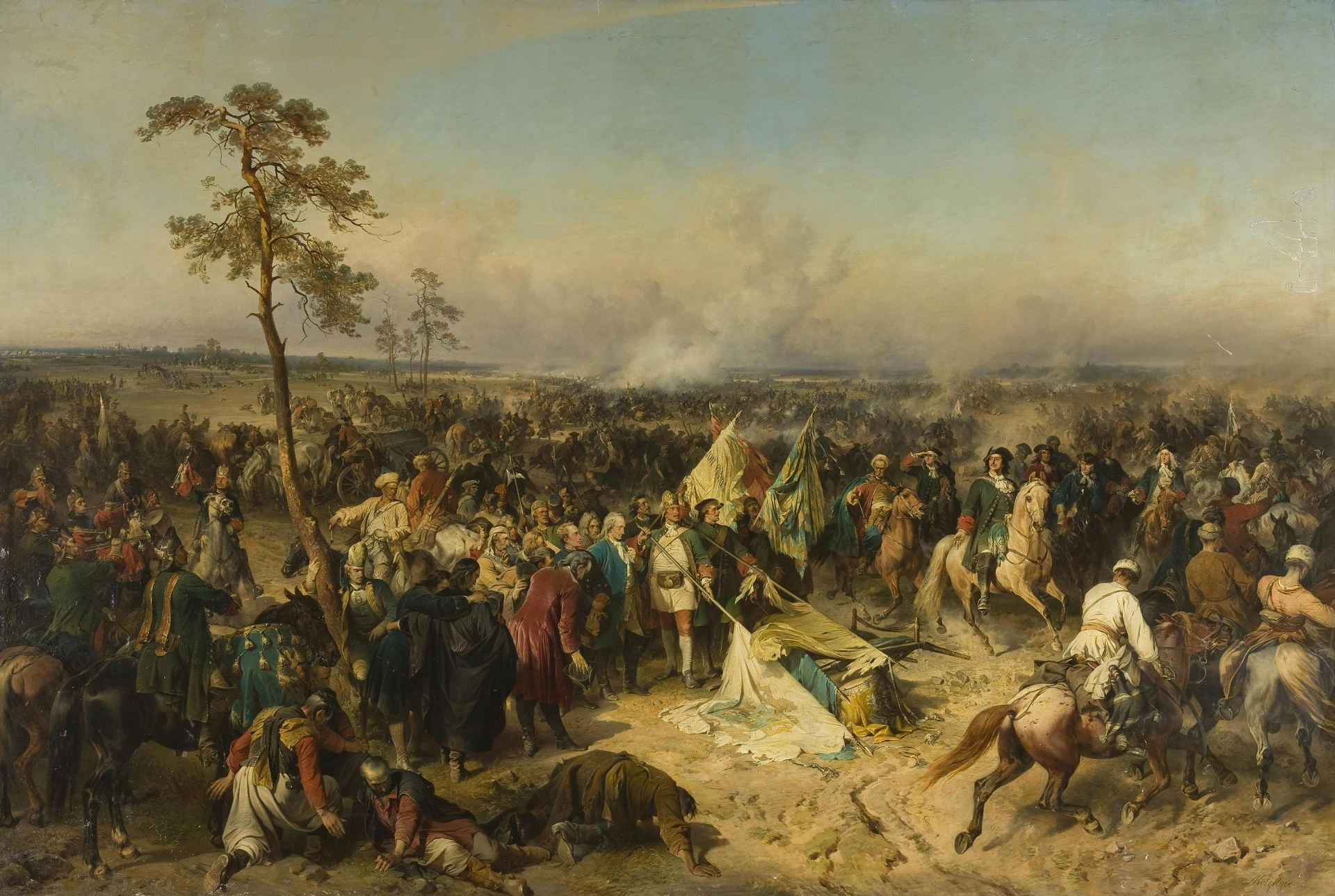
The Victory at Poltava, painted by Alexander von Kotzebue in 1862

The foundations of the Russian Empire were laid during Peter I's reforms, which altered Russia's political and social structure, and as a result of the Great Northern War which strengthened Russia's world standing. Peter I (r. 1682–1725) played a major role in introducing the European state system into Russia. While Russia's vast lands had a population of 14 million, grain yields trailed behind those in the West. Nearly the entire population was devoted to agriculture, with only a small percentage living in towns. The class of kholops, whose status was close to that of slaves, remained a major institution in Russia until 1723, when Peter converted household kholops into house serfs, thus counting them for poll taxation. Agricultural kholops had been converted into serfs in 1679. They were largely tied to the land, in a feudal sense, until the late 19th century.

Peter's first military efforts were directed against the Ottoman Empire. His attention then turned north; Russia lacked a secure northern seaport, except at Arkhangelsk on the White Sea, where the harbor was frozen for nine months a year. Access to the Baltic Sea was blocked by Sweden, whose territory enclosed it on three sides. Peter's ambitions for a "window to the sea" led him, in 1699, to make a secret alliance with Saxony, the Polish–Lithuanian Commonwealth, and Denmark-Norway against Sweden; they conducted the Great Northern War, which ended in 1721 when an exhausted Sweden asked for peace with Russia. On 2 November [O.S. 22 October] 1721, the day of the announcement of the Treaty of Nystad, the Governing Senate and Synod invested the tsar with the titles of Peter the Great, Pater Patriae (father of the fatherland), (Note: Russian: Отец отечества, romanized: Otets otechestva, IPA: [ɐˈtʲet͡s ɐˈtʲet͡ɕɪstvə]) and Imperator of all Russia. (Note: Russian: Император и Самодержец Всероссийский, romanized: Imperator i Samoderzhets Vserossiyskiy) The adoption of the title of imperator by Peter I is seen as the beginning of "imperial" Russia. (Note: Originally there was no distinction between the titles tsar and imperator. However, tsar was also used to refer to other monarchs below the rank of "emperor" (according to the Western European view), and thus Westerners began to translate tsar as rex ("king"). By adopting the title imperator, Peter claimed equality to the Holy Roman Emperor.)

As a result of the war with Sweden, Peter acquired four provinces situated south and east of the Gulf of Finland, securing access to the Baltic Sea. In 1703, he founded the new capital, Saint Petersburg, on the Neva river delta to replace Moscow as the administrative and maritime center. The city was developed on a strict European grid pattern under architects such as Domenico Trezzini, utilizing Petrine Baroque and Italianate architecture to symbolize Russia's integration into Europe.

Peter reorganized his government based on the latest political models, molding Russia into an absolutist state. The Military Regulations recognized the autocratic nature of the regime. Peter replaced the old Boyar Duma (council of nobles) with a nine-member Senate, in effect a supreme council of state. The vestiges of the independence of the boyars were lost. The countryside was divided into new provinces and districts. Peter informed the Senate that its mission was to collect taxes, and tax revenues tripled over his reign. Peter continued and intensified his predecessors' requirement of state service from all nobles, in the Table of Ranks and equated the votchina with an estate. Russia's modern fleet was built by Peter, along with an army reformed in a European style and educational institutions (the Saint Petersburg Academy of Sciences). Civil lettering was adopted during Peter I's reign, and the first Russian newspaper, Vedomosti, was published. Peter I promoted science, particularly geography and geology, trade, and industry, including shipbuilding, as well as the growth of the educational system. Peter laid the groundwork for state-sponsored primary and technical schooling, such as cipher and navigation schools, though formal education remained largely confined to the nobility and state servitors.

As part of Peter's reorganization, he enacted a church reform. The Russian Orthodox Church was partially incorporated into the country's administrative structure, in effect making it a tool of the state. Peter abolished the patriarchate and replaced it with a collective body, the Most Holy Synod, which was led by a government official.

The concept of the triune of the Russian people, composed of the Great Russians, the Little Russians, and the White Russians, was introduced under Peter I, and it was associated with the name of Archimandrite Zacharias Kopystensky (1621), the Archimandrite of the Kiev Pechersk Lavra and expanded upon in the writings of an associate of Peter I, Archbishop Professor Theophan Prokopovich. Several of Peter I's associates included Alexander Menshikov, Jacob Bruce, Mikhail Golitsyn and Anikita Repnin. During Peter's reign serf labor played a significant role in the growth of industry, reinforcing traditional socioeconomic structures. International trade increased as a result of Peter I's industrial reforms. However, imports of goods overtook exports, strengthening the role of foreigners in Russian trade, particularly the British.

In 1722, Peter turned his aspirations toward increasing Russian influence in the Caucasus and the Caspian Sea at the expense of the weakened Safavid Persians. He made Astrakhan the base of military efforts against Persia, and waged the first full-scale war against them in 1722–23. Peter the Great temporarily annexed areas of Iran to Russia, which after his death were returned in the 1732 Treaty of Resht and 1735 Treaty of Ganja as a deal to oppose the Ottomans.

Peter died in 1725, leaving an unsettled succession. After the short reigns of his widow, Catherine I, and his grandson Peter II (who temporarily moved the court back to Moscow), the crown passed to Empress Anna in 1730. She slowed reforms and led a successful war against the Ottoman Empire. This resulted in a significant weakening of the Crimean Khanate, an Ottoman vassal and long-term Russian adversary. The next emperor, the infant Ivan VI, was deposed in 1741 and imprisoned for the rest of his life until being killed in 1764. The discontent over the dominant positions of Baltic Germans in Russian politics resulted in Peter I's daughter Elizabeth being put on the Russian throne in 1741. Elizabeth supported the arts, architecture, and the sciences (for example, the founding of Moscow University). But she did not carry out significant structural reforms. Her reign, which lasted nearly 20 years, is also known for Russia's involvement in the Seven Years' War, where it was successful militarily, but gained little politically.

=== Catherine the Great (1762–1796) ===
Empress Catherine the Great, who reigned from 1762 to 1796, continued the empire's expansion and modernization. Considering herself an enlightened absolutist, she played a key role in the Russian Enlightenment (painted in the 1780s).

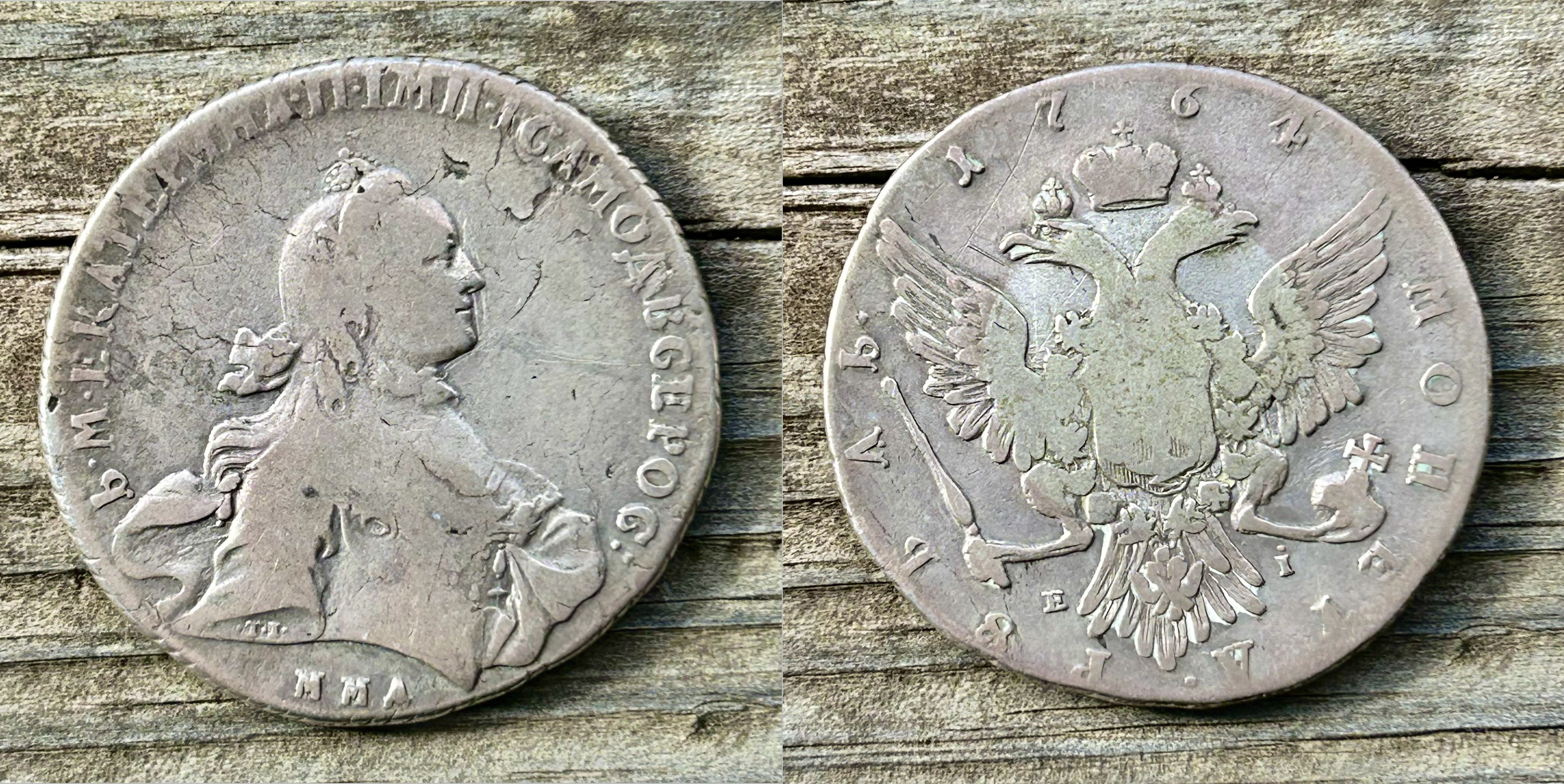
1764, Ruble Catherine II ММД, Krasny Mint

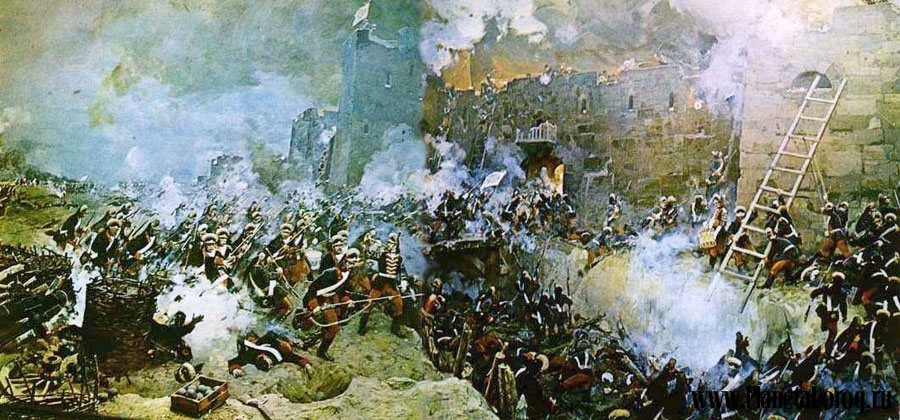
The Storming of Izmail on 22 December 1790, by Russian troops under the command of Alexander Suvorov. Suvorov's victory was immortalized with the empire's newfound national anthem: "Let the Thunder of Victory Rumble!".

Catherine the Great was a German princess who married Peter III, the German heir to the Russian crown. After the death of Empress Elizabeth, Catherine came to power after she effected a coup d'état against her very unpopular husband. She contributed to the resurgence of the Russian nobility that began after the death of Peter the Great, confirming the abolition of compulsory state service (first decreed by Peter III in 1762) and granting nobles control of most state functions in the provinces. She also removed the Beard tax instituted by Peter the Great.

Catherine extended Russian political control over the lands of the Polish–Lithuanian Commonwealth, supporting the Targowica Confederation. However, the cost of these campaigns further burdened the already oppressive social system, under which serfs were required to spend almost all of their time laboring on their owners' land. A major Cossack and peasant uprising erupted in 1773, triggered by growing oppression of serfs and the erosion of Cossack autonomy. Led by the Cossack Yemelyan Pugachev, who claimed to be the deposed Emperor Peter III, the rebels captured substantial territory along the Volga and threatened Moscow before they were suppressed. Instead of imposing the traditional punishment of drawing and quartering, Catherine issued secret instructions that the executioners should execute death sentences quickly and with minimal suffering, as part of her effort to introduce compassion into the law.

She furthered these efforts by ordering the public trial of Darya Nikolayevna Saltykova, a high-ranking noblewoman, on charges of torturing and murdering serfs. Although Catherine sought to project an enlightened image abroad, the outbreak of the French Revolution in 1789 prompted her to suppress political dissent at home. Her son and successor, Paul I, further intensified censorship, banning foreign publications and French cultural influences.

In order to ensure the continued support of the nobility, which was essential to her reign, Catherine was obliged to strengthen their authority and power at the expense of the serfs and other lower classes. Nevertheless, Catherine realized that serfdom must eventually be ended, going so far in her Nakaz ("Instruction") to say that serfs were "just as good as we are" – a comment received with disgust by the nobility. Catherine advanced Russia's southern and western frontiers, successfully waging war against the Ottoman Empire for territory near the Black Sea, and incorporating territories of the Polish–Lithuanian Commonwealth during the Partitions of Poland, alongside Austria and Prussia. As part of the Treaty of Georgievsk, signed with the Georgian Kingdom of Kartli-Kakheti, Catherine launched the Persian expedition of 1796 after Iranian forces invaded eastern Georgia. Although Russian troops achieved swift victories, Catherine died later that year, and her successor Paul I promptly terminated the campaign and withdrew the forces.

Catherine's expansionist policy caused Russia to develop into a major European power, as did the Enlightenment era and the Golden age in Russia. But after Catherine died in 1796, she was succeeded by her son, Paul. He brought Russia into a major coalition war against the revolutionary French Republic in 1798. Russian commander Field Marshal Suvorov led the Italian and Swiss expedition, inflicting a series of defeats on the French, in particular at the Battle of the Trebbia in 1799.

==== State budget ====
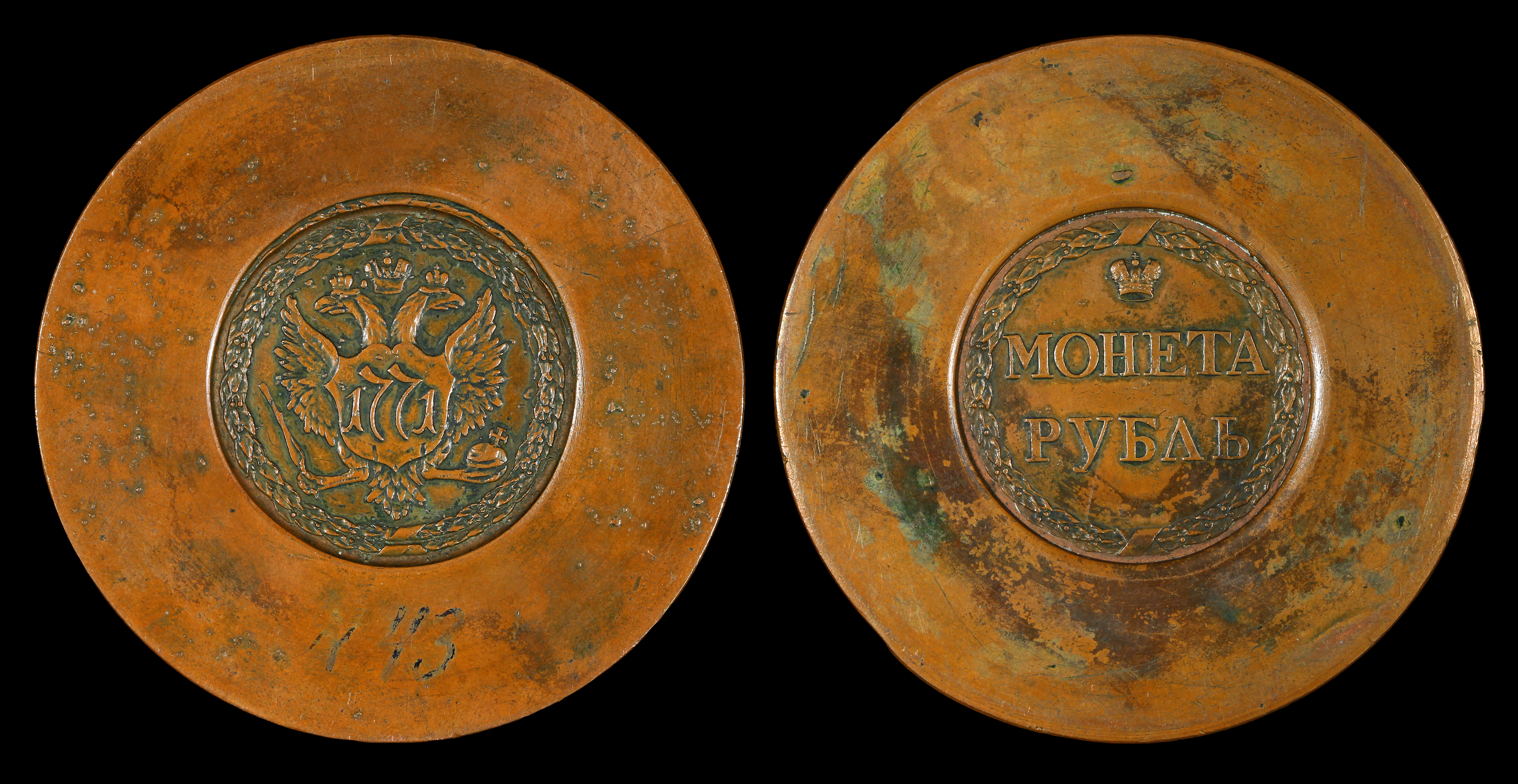
Catherine II Sestroretsk Ruble (1771) is made of solid copper measuring 77 mm (3 1/32 in) (diameter), 26 mm (1 1/32 in) (thickness), and weighs 1,041 g (2 lb 4 3/4 oz).

Russia was in a continuous state of financial crisis. While revenue rose from 9 million rubles in 1724 to 40 million in 1794, expenses grew more rapidly, reaching 49 million in 1794. The budget allocated 46 percent to the military, 20 percent to government economic activities, 12 percent to administration, and nine percent for the Imperial Court in St. Petersburg. The deficit required borrowing, primarily from bankers in Amsterdam; five percent of the budget was allocated to debt payments. Paper money was issued to pay for expensive wars, thus causing inflation. As a result of its spending, Russia developed a large and well-equipped army, a very large and complex bureaucracy, and a court that rivaled those of Versailles and London. But the government was living far beyond its means, and 18th-century Russia became "poor and backward" after the middle of the century and remained "an overwhelmingly agricultural and illiterate country".

=== Population ===
Much of Russia's expansion occurred in the 17th century, culminating in the first Russian colonization of the Pacific, the Russo-Polish War (1654–1667) which led to the incorporation of left-bank Ukraine, and the Russian conquest of Siberia. Poland was partitioned by its rivals in 1772–1815, most of its land and population taken under Russian rule. Most of the empire's growth in the 19th century came from gaining territory in central and eastern Asia south of Siberia. By 1795, after the Partitions of Poland, Russia became the most populous state in Europe, ahead of France.

Year	Population of Russia (millions)	Notes
1720	16	includes new Baltic and Polish territories
1795	38	includes part of Poland
1812	43	includes Grand Duchy of Finland
1858	74	10th revision census; includes Congress Poland, Bessarabia, and the Caucasus
1897	126	Russian Empire census, (Note: First and only census carried out in the Russian Empire.) excludes Grand Duchy of Finland
1914	164	includes new Asian territories

=== First half of the 19th century ===
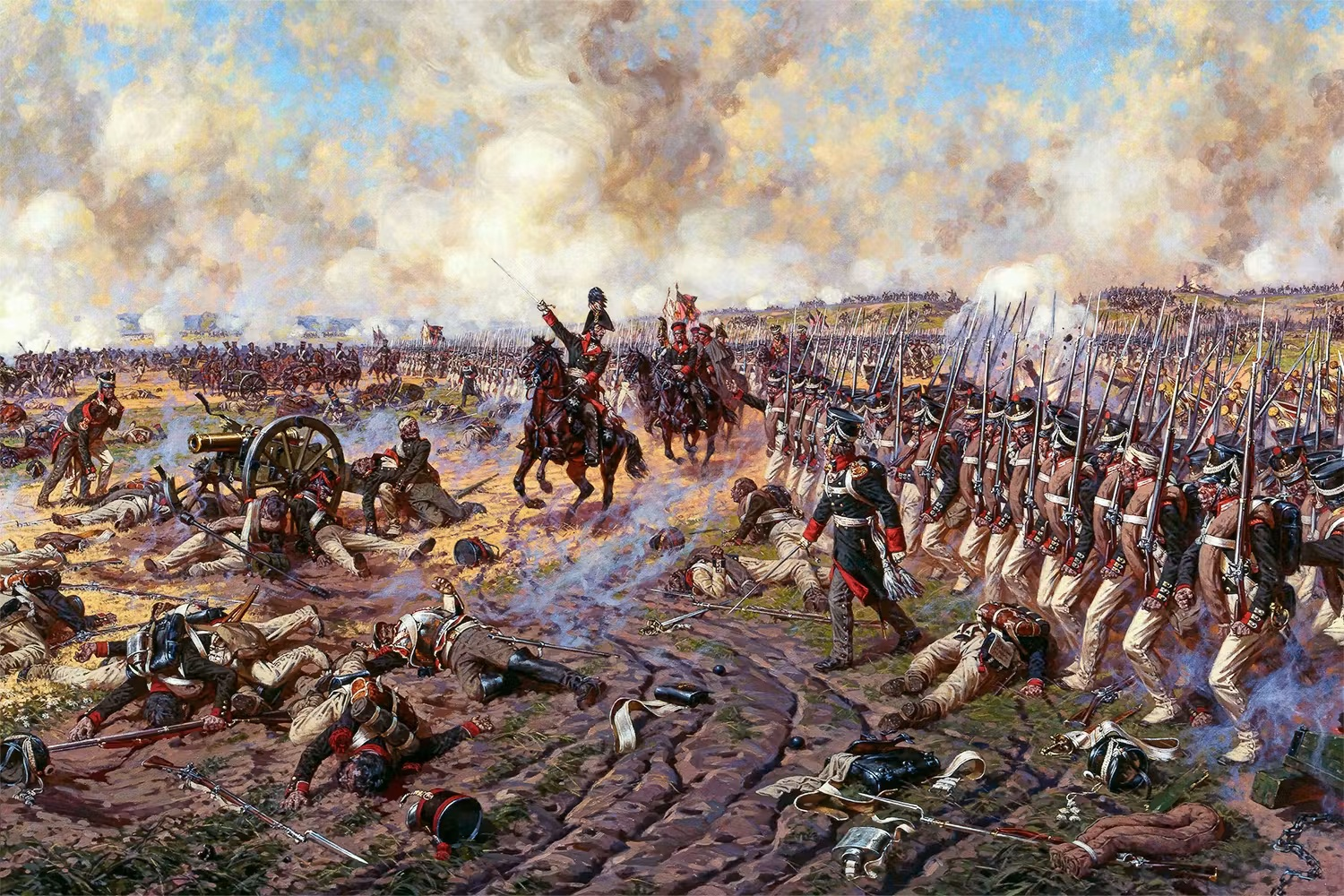
Pyotr Bagration at the Battle of Borodino

In 1801, over four years after Paul became the emperor of Russia, he was killed in Saint Michael's Castle in a coup. Paul was succeeded by his 23-year-old son, Alexander. Russia was in a state of war with the French Republic under the leadership of the Corsica-born First Consul Napoleon Bonaparte. After he became the emperor, Napoleon defeated Russia at Austerlitz in 1805, Eylau and Friedland in 1807. After Alexander was defeated in Friedland, he agreed to negotiate and sued for peace with France; the Treaties of Tilsit established a Franco-Russian alliance against the Coalition, and Russia joined the Continental System. By 1812, Russia had occupied many territories in Eastern Europe, holding some of Eastern Galicia from Austria and Bessarabia from the Ottoman Empire; from Northern Europe, it had gained Finland from the war against a weakened Sweden; it also gained some territory in the Caucasus.

Following a dispute with Emperor Alexander I, in 1812, Napoleon launched an invasion of Russia. It was catastrophic for France, whose army was decimated during the Russian winter. Although Napoleon's Grande Armée reached Moscow, the Russians' scorched earth strategy prevented the invaders from living off the country. In the harsh and bitter winter, thousands of French troops were ambushed and killed by peasant guerrilla fighters. Russian troops then pursued Napoleon's forces across Europe to Paris, cementing Russia's status as a premier arbiter of the post-war European order at the Congress of Vienna (1815), which confirmed Alexander as constitutional monarch of Congress Poland. The "Holy Alliance" was proclaimed, linking the monarchist great powers of Austria, Prussia, and Russia.

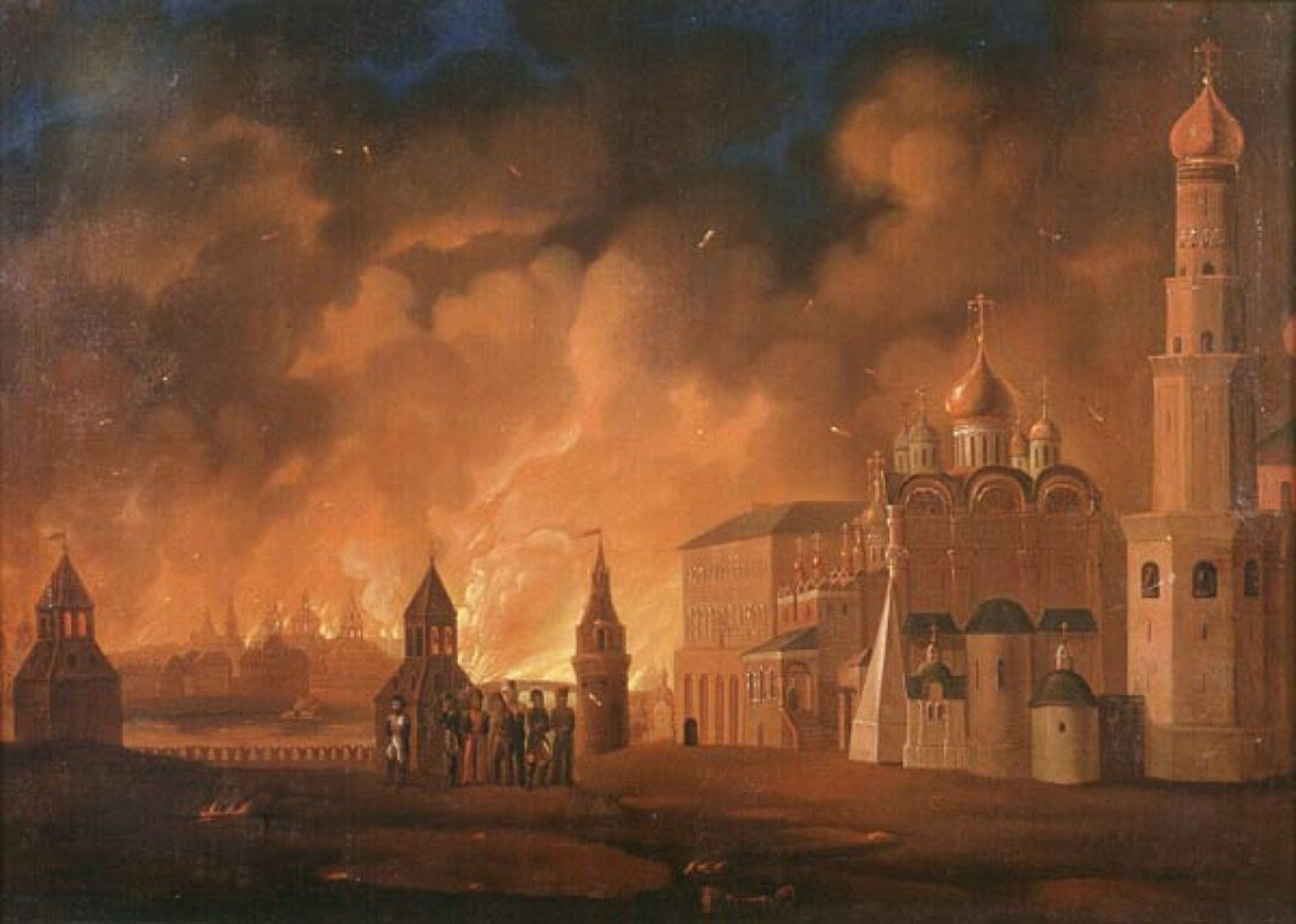
An 1813 painting depicting the Fire of Moscow, Russia had burned the city just before Napoleon could reach and occupy it.

Although the Russian Empire played a leading political role in the next century, thanks to its role in defeating Napoleonic France, its retention of serfdom precluded economic progress to any significant degree. As Western European economic growth accelerated during the Industrial Revolution, Russia began to lag ever farther behind, creating new weaknesses for the empire seeking to play a role as a great power. Russia's status as a great power concealed the inefficiency of its government, the isolation of its people, and its economic and social backwardness. Following the defeat of Napoleon, Alexander I had been ready to discuss constitutional reforms, but though a few were introduced, no major changes were attempted.

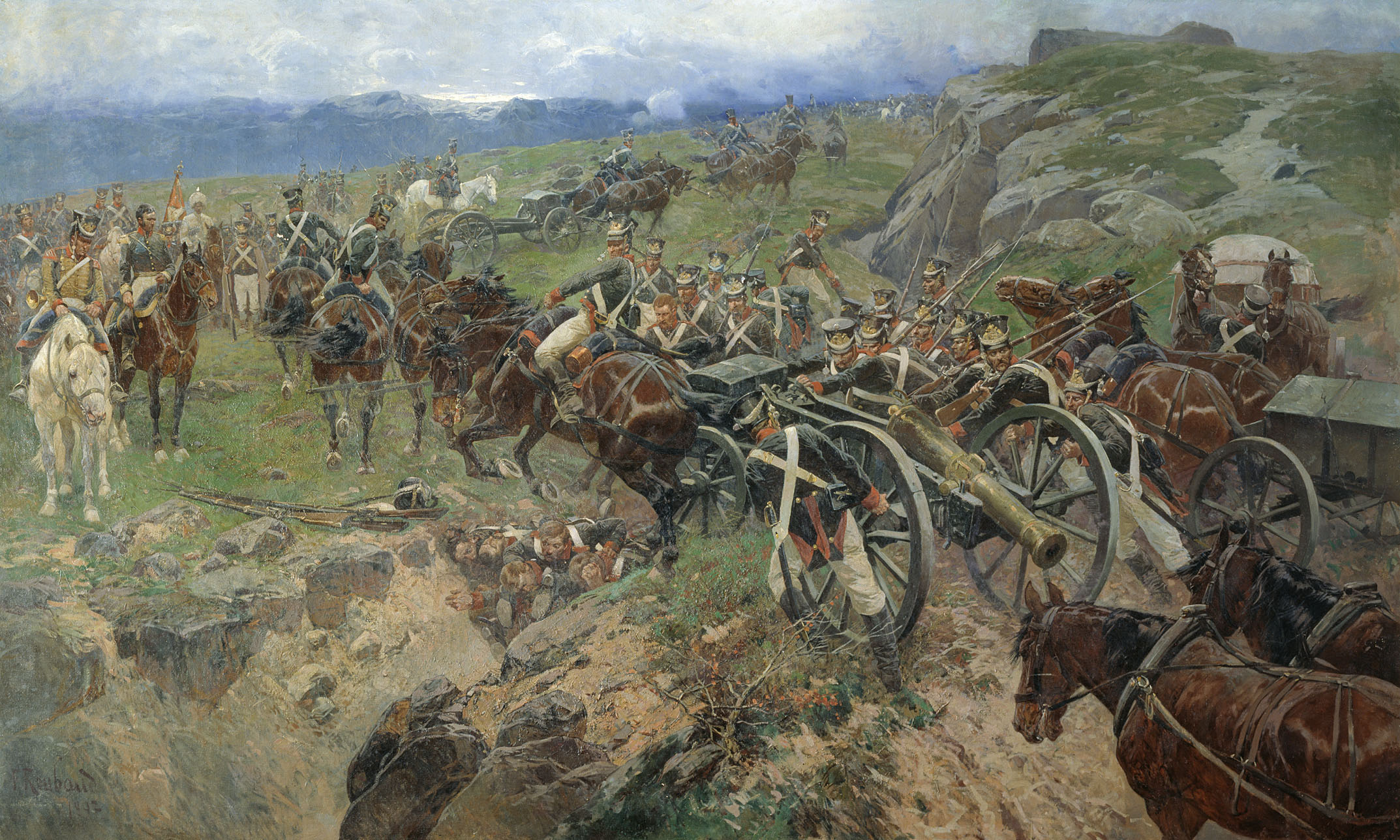
This 1892 painting imagines a scene of Russian troops forming a bridge with their bodies, moving equipment to prepare for invading Persian forces during the Russo-Persian War (1804–1813), which occurred contemporaneously with the French invasion of Russia.

The liberal Alexander I was replaced by his younger brother Nicholas I (1825–1855), who at the beginning of his reign was confronted with an uprising. The background of this revolt lay in the Napoleonic Wars, when a number of well-educated Russian officers travelled in Europe in the course of military campaigns, where their exposure to the liberalism of Western Europe encouraged them to seek change on their return to autocratic Russia. The result was the Decembrist revolt (December 1825), which was the work of a small circle of liberal nobles and army officers who wanted to install Nicholas' brother Constantine as a constitutional monarch. The revolt was easily crushed, but it caused Nicholas to turn away from the modernization program begun by Peter the Great and champion the doctrine of Orthodoxy, Autocracy, and Nationality.

In order to repress further revolts, censorship was intensified, including the constant surveillance of schools and universities. Textbooks were strictly regulated by the government. Police spies were planted everywhere. Under Nicholas I, political subversives were exiled to Siberia, while hundreds of thousands of common criminals and state convicts were processed through the exile and katorga system over the course of the century. The retaliation for the revolt made "December Fourteenth" a day long remembered by later revolutionary movements.

The question of Russia's direction had been gaining attention ever since Peter the Great's program of modernization. Some favored imitating Western Europe while others were against this and called for a return to the traditions of the past. The latter path was advocated by Slavophiles, who held the "decadent" West in contempt. The Slavophiles were opponents of bureaucracy, who preferred the collectivism of the medieval Russian obshchina or mir over the individualism of the West. More extreme social doctrines were elaborated by Russian radicals on the left, such as Alexander Herzen, Mikhail Bakunin, and Peter Kropotkin.

==== Foreign policy (1800–1864) ====
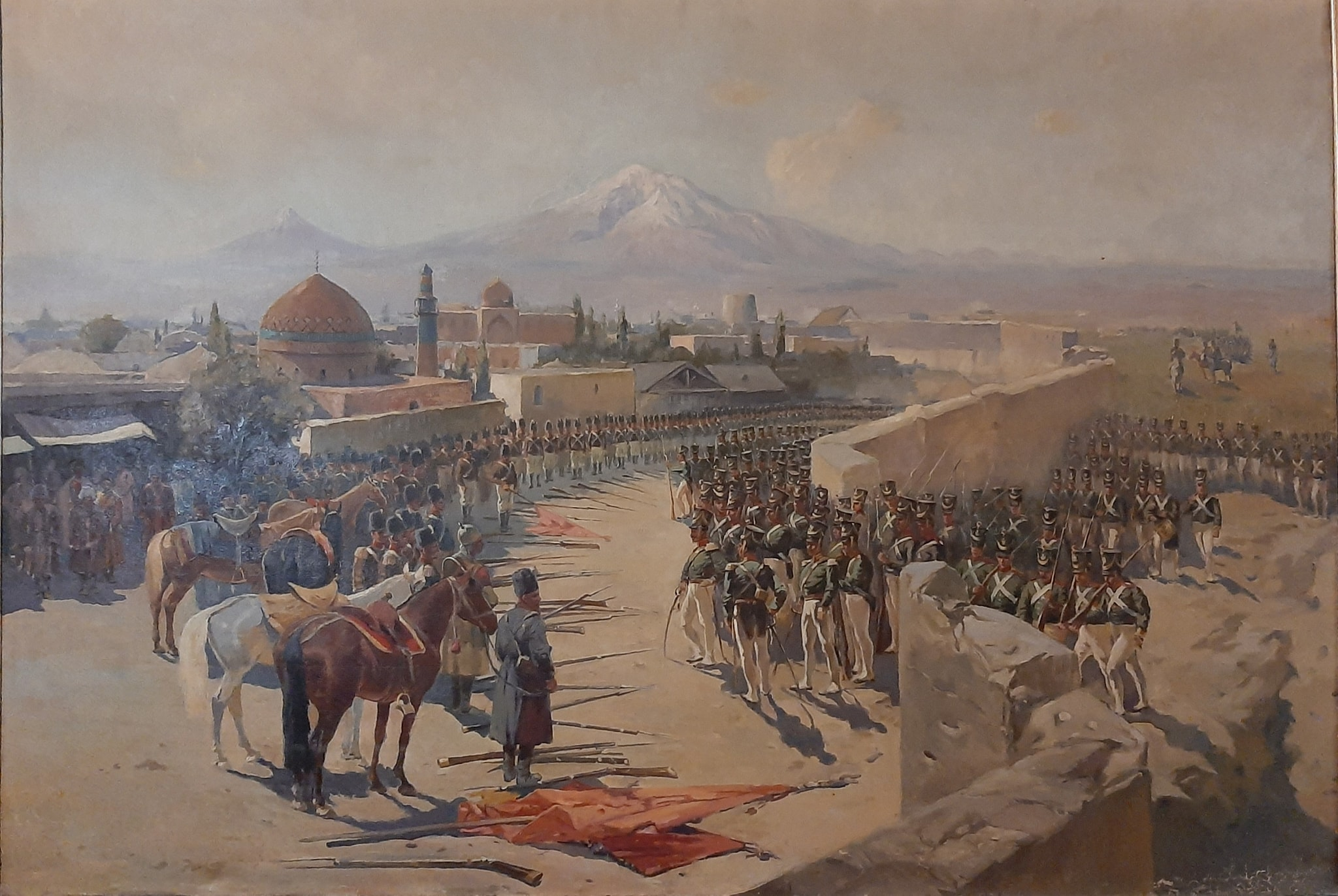
Franz Roubaud's 1893 painting of the Erivan Fortress siege in 1827 by the Russian forces under leadership of Ivan Paskevich during the Russo-Persian War (1826–1828)

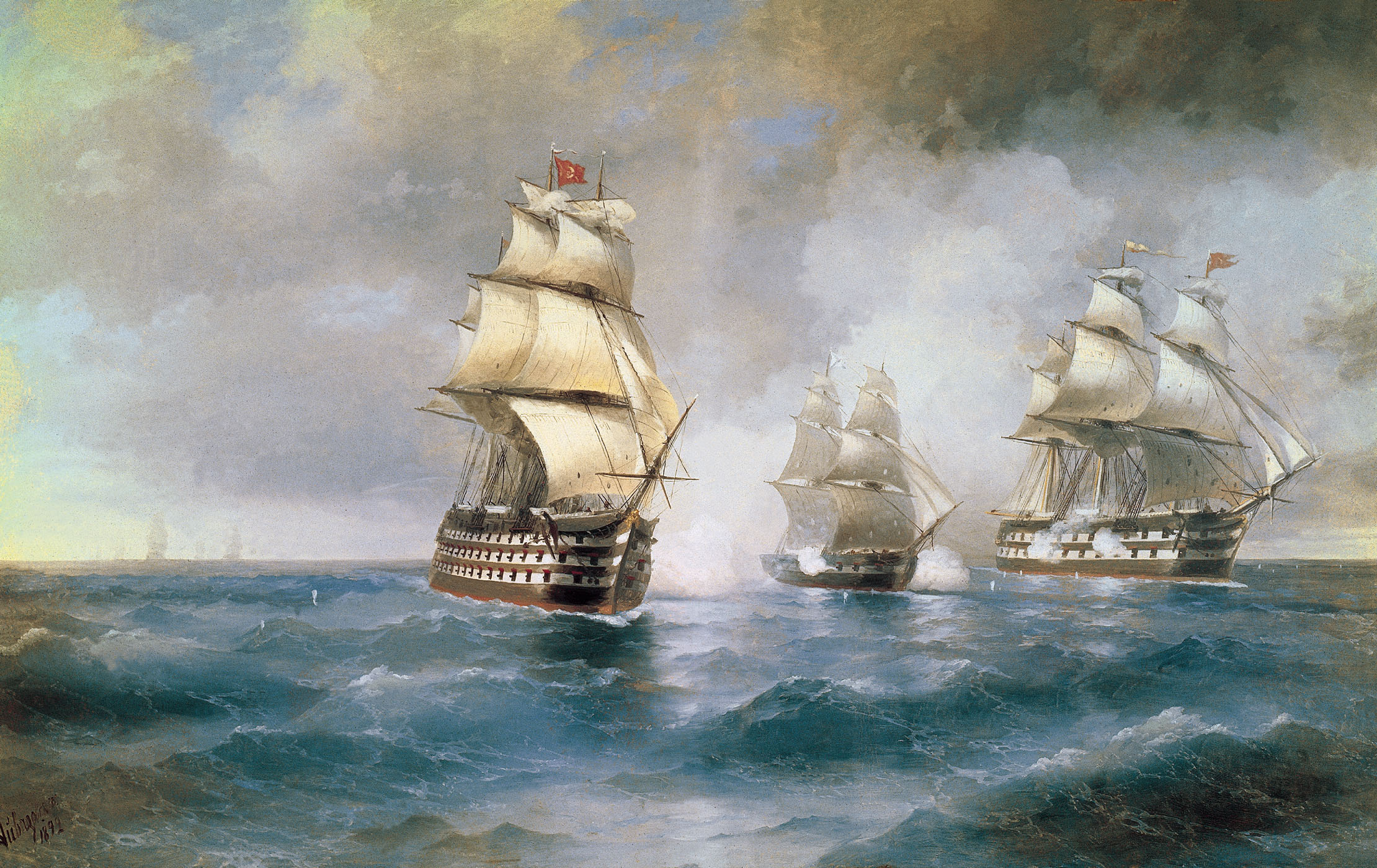
1892 painting depicting Imperial Russian Navy Brig "Mercury" Attacked by Two Turkish Ships in a scene from the Russo-Turkish War (1828–1829), by Ivan Aivazovsky

Following the incorporation of the Eastern Georgian Kingdom into the empire in 1801, Russian forces clashed with Persia over control of the Caucasus during the Russo-Persian War (1804–1813), and also became involved in the Caucasian War against the Caucasian Imamate. At the conclusion of the war, Persia irrevocably ceded what is now Dagestan, eastern Georgia, and most of Azerbaijan to Russia, under the Treaty of Gulistan. Russia attempted to expand to the southwest, at the expense of the Ottoman Empire, using recently acquired Georgia at its base for its Caucasus and Anatolian front. The late 1820s were successful years militarily. Despite losing almost all recently consolidated territories in the first year of the Russo-Persian War of 1826–1828, Russia managed to favorably bring an end to the war with the Treaty of Turkmenchay, including the formal acquisition of what are now Armenia, Azerbaijan, and Iğdır Province. In the 1828–1829 Russo-Turkish War, Russia invaded northeastern Anatolia and occupied the strategic Ottoman towns of Erzurum and Gümüşhane (Argiroupoli) and, posing as protector of the Greek Orthodox population, received extensive support from the region's Pontic Greeks. Following a brief occupation, the Russian imperial army withdrew back into Georgia.

Russian emperors quelled two uprisings in their newly acquired Polish territories: the November Uprising in 1830 and the January Uprising in 1863. In 1863, the Russian autocracy had given the Polish artisans and gentry reason to rebel, by assailing national core values of language, religion, and culture. France, Britain, and Austria tried to intervene in the crisis but were unable to do so. The Russian press and state propaganda used the Polish uprising to justify the need for unity in the empire. The semi-autonomous polity of Congress Poland subsequently lost its distinctive political and judicial rights, with Russification being imposed on its schools and courts. However, Russification policies in Poland, Finland and among the Germans in the Baltics largely failed and only strengthened political opposition.

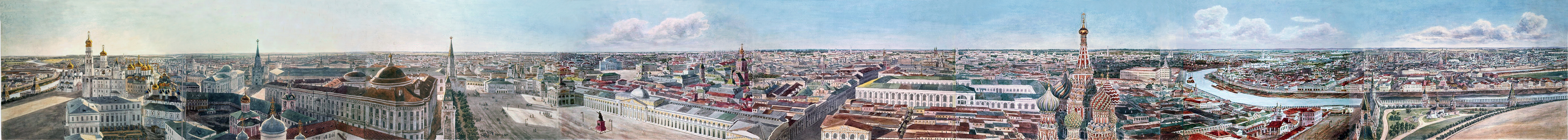
A panoramic view of Moscow from the Spasskaya Tower in 1819 (hand-drawn lithograph)

=== Second half of the 19th century ===
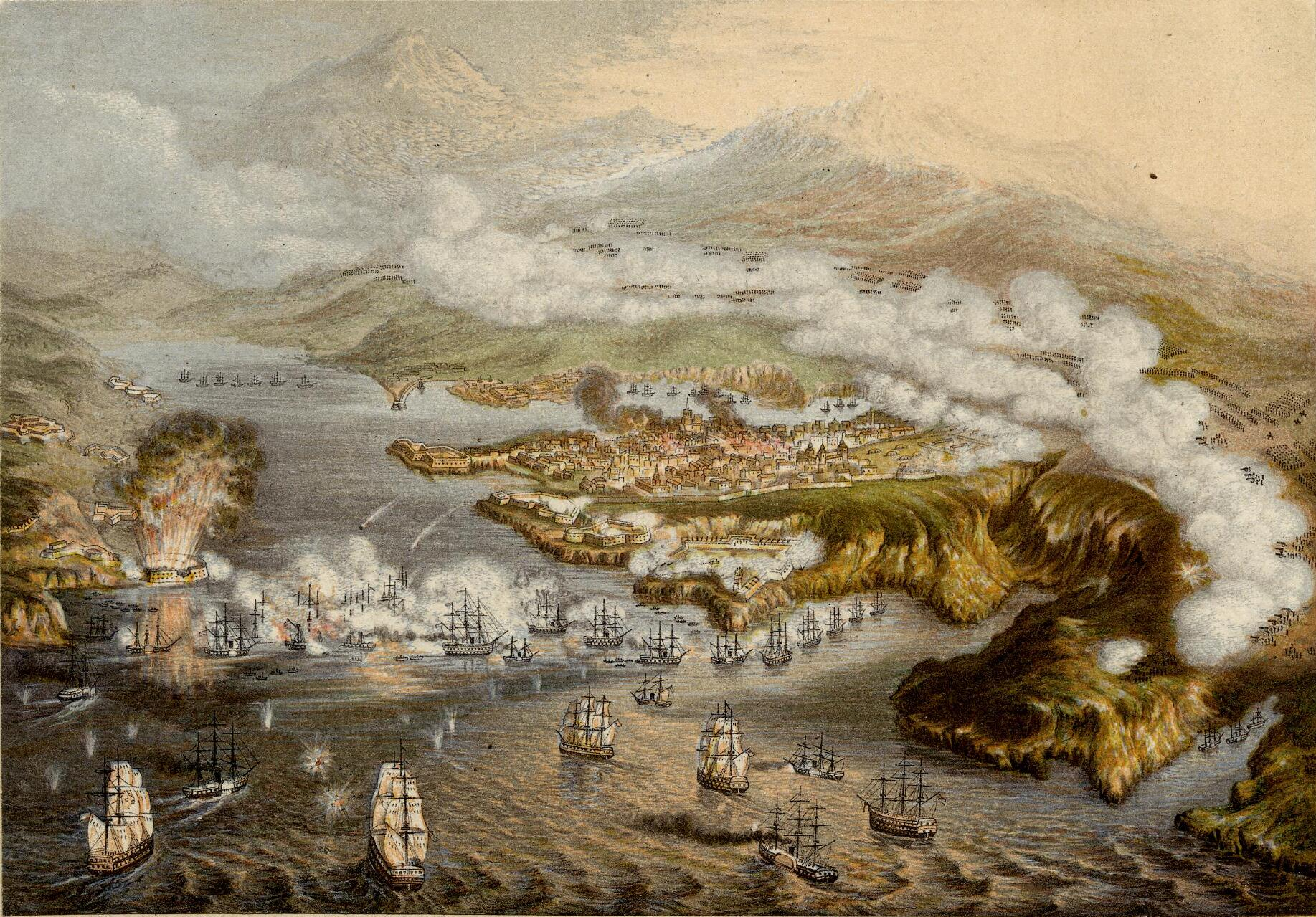
The eleven-month siege of the Russian naval base at Sevastopol during the Crimean War

In 1853–1856, Russia fought a coalition of Britain, France, Sardinia, and the Ottoman Empire in the Crimean War. The defeat, formalized by the 1856 Treaty of Paris, forced Russia to demilitarize the Black Sea and surrender parts of Bessarabia. The conflict shattered the perception of Russian military invincibility, exposing critical technological lags in steam-powered naval craft, rifled small arms, and railway infrastructure compared to Western industrial powers.

Imperial standard of the emperor from 1858 to 1917. Previous variations of the black eagle on gold background were used as far back as Peter the Great's time. The emblems on the wings represent the tsardoms of Kazan, Astrakhan, Poland, Siberia, Taurida, and Georgia, the grand principalities of Kiev, Vladimir, and Novgorod, and the grand duchy of Finland.

When Emperor Alexander II ascended the throne in 1855, the desire for reform was widespread. Critics increasingly condemned serfdom as morally reprehensible and economically inefficient. In 1859, there were more than 23 million serfs in usually poor living conditions. Alexander II decided to abolish serfdom from above, with ample provision for the landowners, instead of waiting for it to be abolished from below by revolution.

The Emancipation Reform of 1861, which freed the serfs, was the single most important event in 19th-century Russian history, and the beginning of the end of the landed aristocracy's monopoly on power. The 1860s saw further socioeconomic reforms to clarify the position of the Russian government with regard to property rights. Emancipation brought a supply of free labor to the cities, stimulating industry, while the middle class grew in number and influence. However, instead of receiving their lands as a gift, the freed peasants had to pay a special lifetime tax to the government, which in turn paid the landlords a generous price for the land that they had lost. In numerous cases the peasants ended up with relatively small amounts of the least productive land. All the property turned over to the peasants was owned collectively by the mir, the village community, which divided the land among the peasants and supervised the various holdings. Although serfdom was abolished, its abolition was achieved on terms unfavorable to peasants; thus, revolutionary tensions remained. Revolutionaries believed that the newly freed serfs were merely being sold into wage slavery in the onset of the industrial revolution, and that the urban bourgeoisie had effectively replaced the landowners.

The black-yellow-white flag, established by Alexander II in 1858 as the first officially codified state flag of the Russian Empire (used until 1896).

Seeking more territories, Russia obtained Priamurye (Outer Manchuria) from the weakened Manchu-led Qing China, which had been occupied fighting against the Taiping Rebellion. In 1858, the Treaty of Aigun ceded much of the Manchu homeland to the Russian Empire, and in 1860, the Treaty of Peking also ceded the modern Primorsky Krai, which provided the land for the establishment of the outpost of the future Vladivostok. Meanwhile, Russia under Alexander II decided to sell what it saw as the indefensible Russian America to the United States for 11 million rubles (7.2 million dollars) in 1867 to Andrew Johnson's government in the Alaska Purchase. Initially, many Americans considered this newly gained territory to be a wasteland and useless, and saw the government wasting money, whereupon the transaction was sometimes called "Seward's Folly" through the eponymous Secretary of State William H. Seward who brokered the deal, but later, much gold and petroleum were discovered.

In the late 1870s, Russia and the Ottoman Empire again clashed in the Balkans. From 1875 to 1877, the Balkan crisis intensified, with rebellions against Ottoman rule by various Slavic nationalities, which the Ottoman Turks had dominated since the 15th century. This was seen as a political risk in Russia, which similarly suppressed its Muslims in Central Asia and Caucasia. Russian nationalist opinion became a major domestic factor with its support for liberating Balkan Christians from Ottoman rule and making Bulgaria and Serbia independent. In early 1877, Russia intervened on behalf of Serbian and Russian volunteer forces, leading to the Russo-Turkish War (1877–78). Within one year, Russian troops were nearing Constantinople and the Ottomans surrendered. Russia's nationalist diplomats and generals persuaded Alexander II to force the Ottomans to sign the Treaty of San Stefano in March 1878, creating an enlarged, independent Bulgaria that stretched into the southwestern Balkans. When Britain threatened to declare war over the terms of the treaty, an exhausted Russia backed down. At the Congress of Berlin in July 1878, Russia agreed to the creation of a smaller Bulgaria and Eastern Rumelia, as a vassal state and an autonomous principality inside the Ottoman Empire, respectively. As a result, Pan-Slavists were left with a legacy of bitterness against Austria-Hungary and Germany for failing to back Russia. Disappointment at the results of the war stimulated revolutionary tensions, and helped Serbia, Romania, and Montenegro gain independence from, and strengthen themselves against, the Ottomans.

Another significant result of the war was the acquisition from the Ottomans of the provinces of Batumi, Ardahan, and Kars in Transcaucasia, which were transformed into the militarily administered regions of Batum Oblast and Kars Oblast. To replace Muslim refugees who had fled across the new frontier into Ottoman territory, the Russian authorities settled large numbers of Christians from ethnically diverse communities in Kars Oblast, particularly Georgians, Caucasus Greeks, and Armenians, each of whom hoped to achieve protection and advance their own regional ambitions.

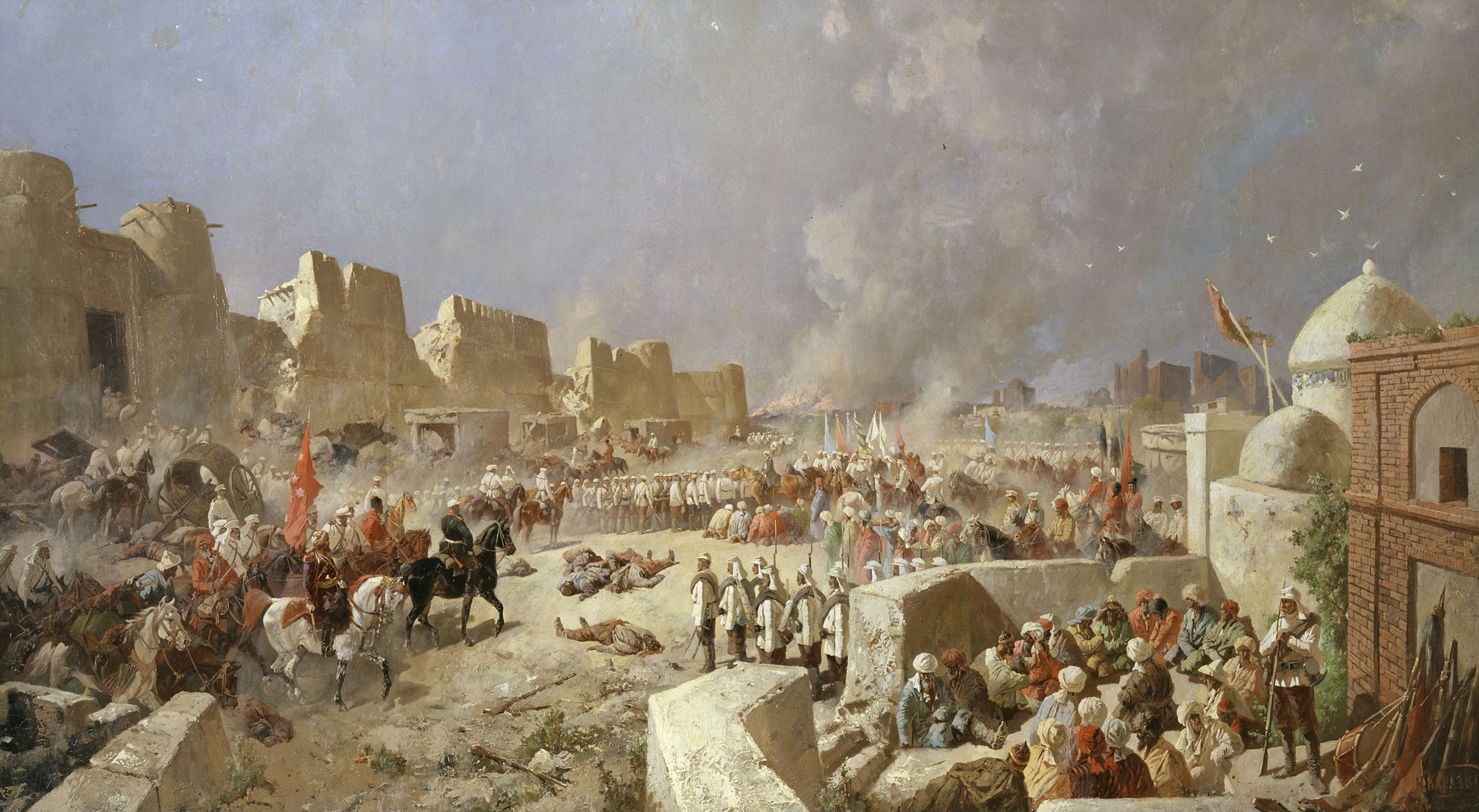
Russian troops taking Samarkand (1868)

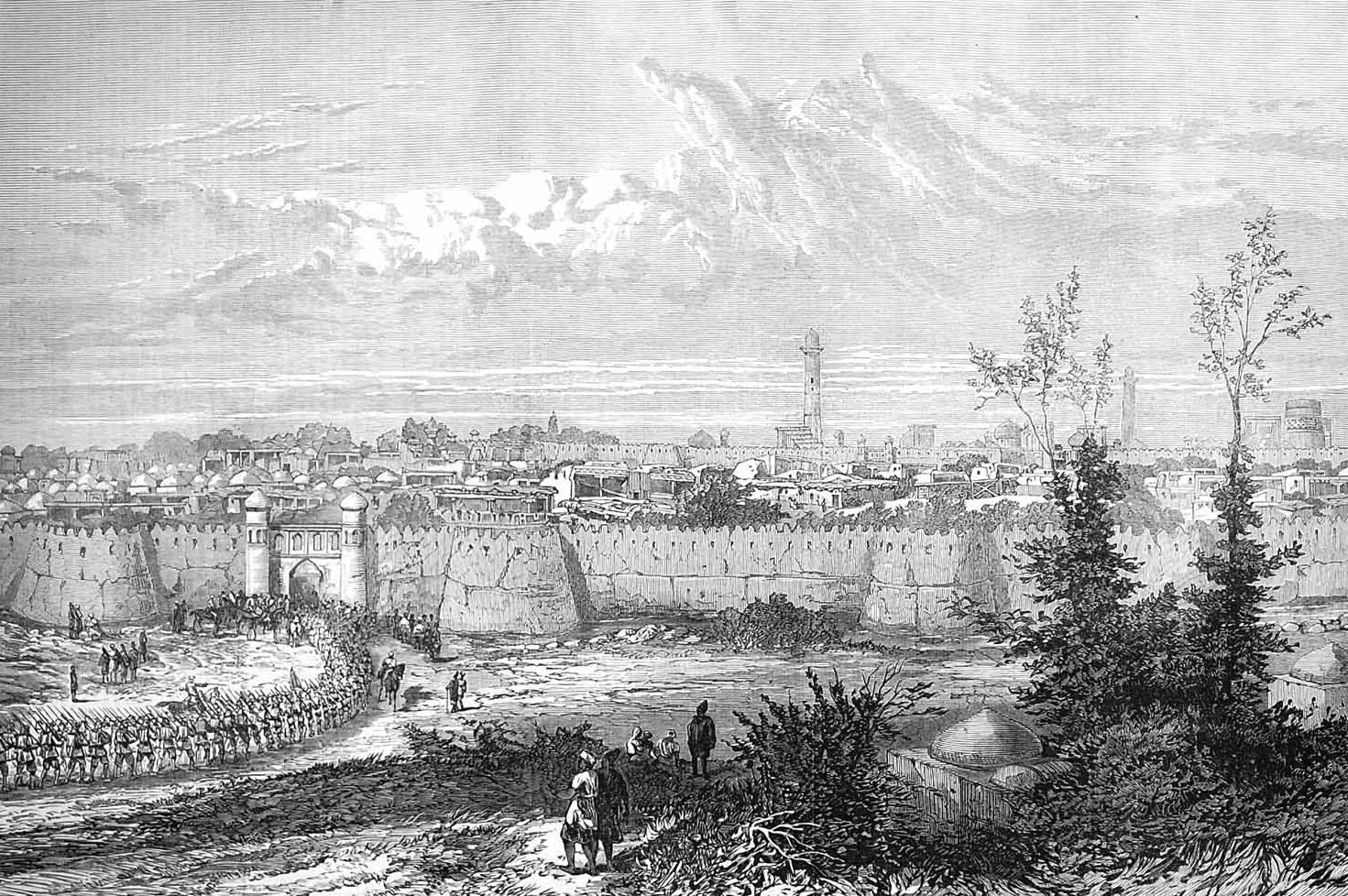
Russian troops entering Khiva in 1873

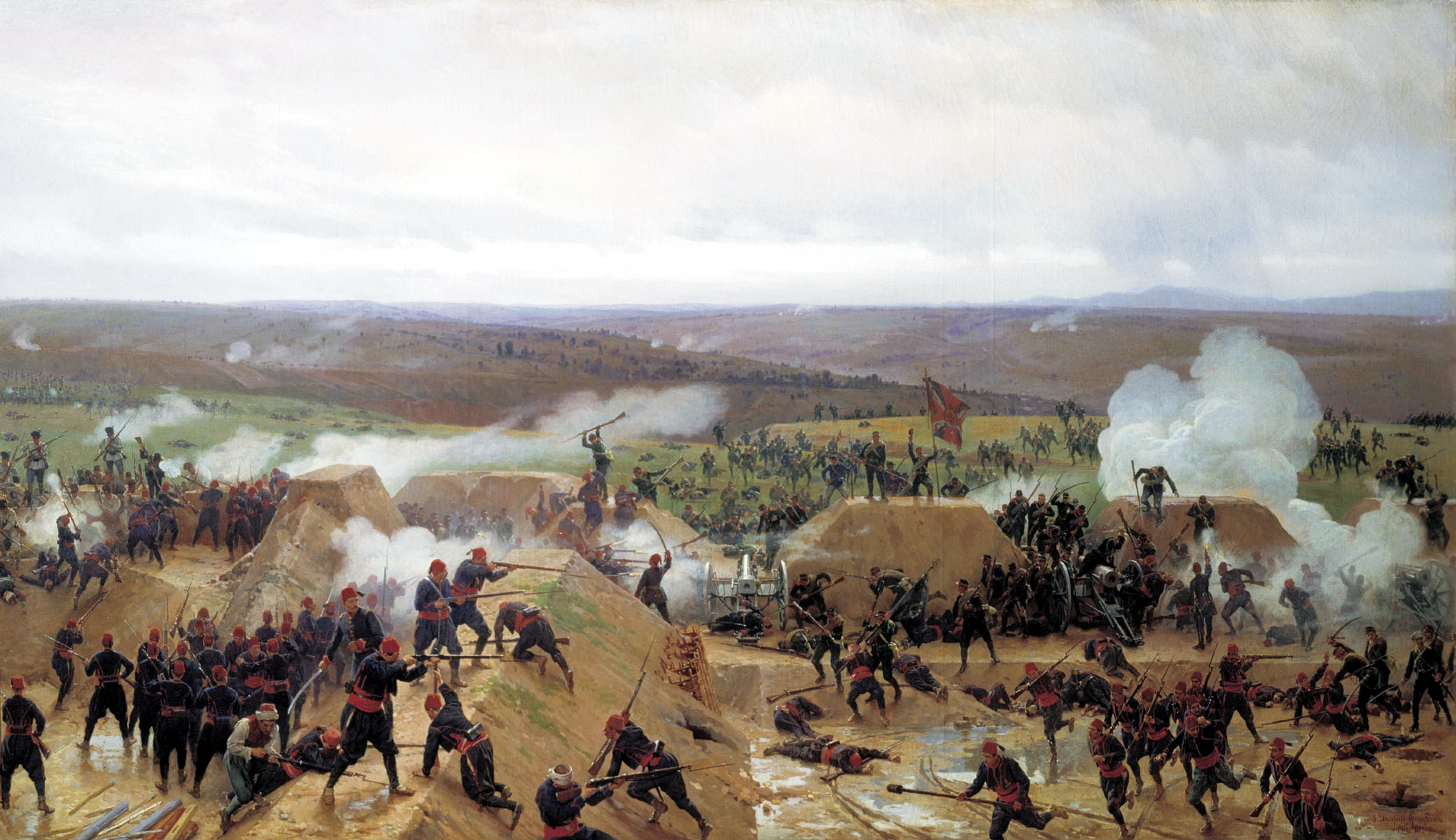
Capturing of the redoubt at Plevna (1877)

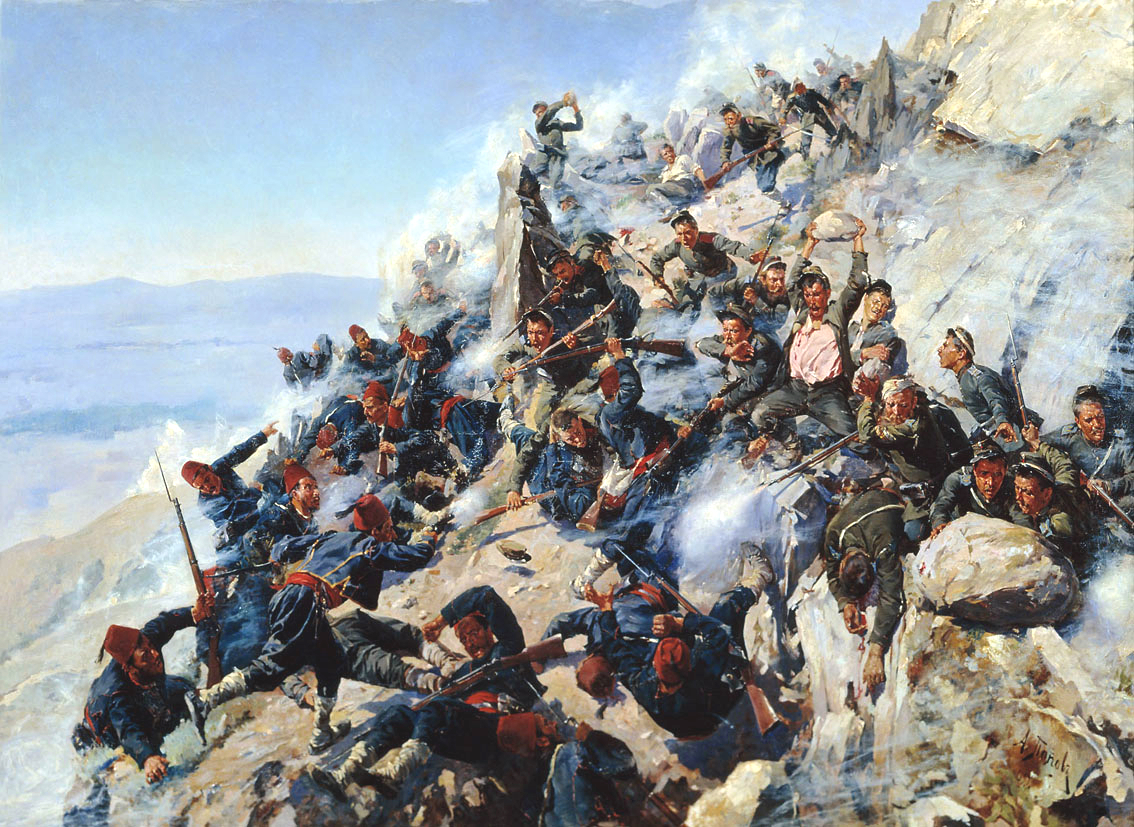
Battle of Shipka Pass (1877)

==== Alexander III ====
The Greater coat of arms of the Russian Empire, adopted under Alexander III in 1882 to reflect the sovereign's full imperial title and realms.

In 1881, Alexander II was assassinated by the Narodnaya Volya, a nihilist terrorist organization. The throne passed to Alexander III (1881–1894), a reactionary who revived the maxim of Orthodoxy, Autocracy, and Nationality of Nicholas I. A committed Slavophile, Alexander III believed that Russia could be saved from turmoil only by shutting itself off from the subversive influences of Western Europe. During his reign, Russia formed the Franco-Russian Alliance, to contain the growing power of Germany; completed the conquest of Central Asia; and demanded important territorial and commercial concessions from China. The emperor's most influential adviser was Konstantin Pobedonostsev, tutor to Alexander III and his son Nicholas, and procurator of the Holy Synod from 1880 to 1895. Pobedonostsev taught his imperial pupils to fear freedom of speech and the press, as well as dislike democracy, constitutions, and the parliamentary system. Under Pobedonostsev's ideological influence and the 1881 Exceptional Measures, the imperial security police (Okhrana) and gendarmerie were systematically expanded to suppress radical political organizations, subjecting suspects to administrative exile in Siberia while imperial authorities enforced aggressive Russification policies across non-Russian borderlands.

==== Foreign policy (1864–1907) ====
Russian forces steadily subjugated Central Asia, capturing Tashkent (1865), Samarkand (1868), and Khiva (1873), and establishing the governorate-general of Russian Turkestan. This advance alarmed the British Empire over the security of the India frontier, initiating decades of regional rivalry and diplomatic maneuvering known as the Great Game. That rivalry between the two empires has been considered to have included far-flung territories such as Outer Mongolia and Tibet. The maneuvering largely ended with the Anglo-Russian Convention of 1907.

Expansion into the vast stretches of Siberia was slow and expensive, but finally became possible with the building of the Trans-Siberian Railway, 1890 to 1904. This opened up East Asia; and Russian interests focused on Mongolia, Manchuria, and Korea. China was too weak to resist, and was pulled increasingly into the Russian sphere. Russia obtained treaty ports such as Dalian/Port Arthur. In 1900, the Russian Empire invaded Manchuria as part of the Eight-Nation Alliance's intervention against the Boxer Rebellion. Japan strongly opposed Russian expansion, and defeated Russia in the Russo-Japanese War of 1904–1905. Japan took over Korea, and Manchuria remained a contested area.

Meanwhile, France, looking for allies against Germany after 1871, formed a military alliance in 1894, with large-scale loans to Russia, sales of arms, and warships, as well as diplomatic support. Following the Anglo-Russian Convention in 1907, which partitioned Persia into spheres of influence and recognized British dominance over Afghanistan, Britain, France, and Russia stood together in opposition to Germany and Austria-Hungary. The three would later comprise the Triple Entente alliance in the First World War.

=== Early 20th century ===
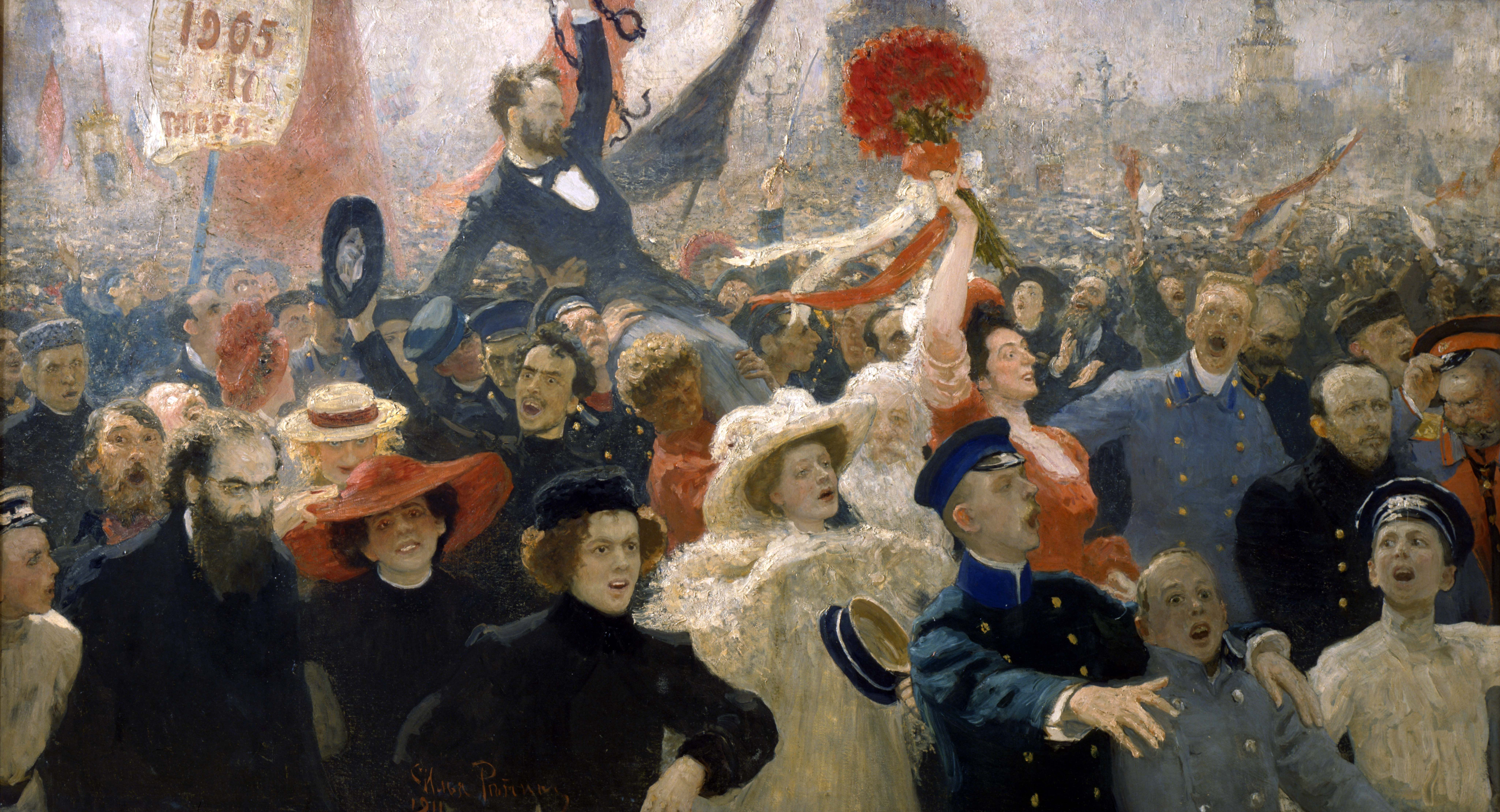
A scene from the First Russian Revolution, by Ilya Repin

View of Moscow River from the Kremlin, 1908

In 1894, Alexander III was succeeded by his son, Nicholas II, who was committed to retaining the autocracy that his father had left him. Nicholas II proved to be an ineffective ruler, and in the end his dynasty was overthrown by the Russian Revolution. The Industrial Revolution began to show significant influence in Russia, but the country remained rural and poor.

Economic conditions steadily improved after 1890, thanks to new crops such as sugar beets, and new access to railway transportation. Total grain production increased, as well as exports, even with rising domestic demand from population growth. As a result, there was a slow improvement in the living standards of Russian peasants in the empire's last two decades before 1914. Recent research into the physical stature of Army recruits shows they were bigger and stronger. There were regional variations, with more poverty in the heavily populated central black earth region; and there were temporary downturns in 1891–93 and 1905–1908.

On the political right, the reactionary elements of the aristocracy strongly favored the large landholders, who, however, were slowly selling their land to the peasants through the Peasants' Land Bank. The Octobrist party was a conservative force, with a base of landowners and businessmen. They accepted land reform but insisted that property owners be fully paid. They favored far-reaching reforms, and hoped the landlord class would fade away, while agreeing they should be paid for their land. Liberal elements among industrial capitalists and nobility, who believed in peaceful social reform and a constitutional monarchy, formed the Constitutional Democratic Party or Kadets.

On the left, the Socialist Revolutionaries (SRs) and the Marxist Social Democrats (RSDLP) wanted to expropriate lands but were undecided on the question of individual or collective ownership. The Socialist Revolutionaries also differed from the Social Democrats in that the SRs believed a revolution must rely on the peasantry, not the urban workers.

The RSDLP's formative years were marked by ideological and strategic disputes culminating at its Second Congress in 1903, where the party split into two main factions: the Bolsheviks, led by Vladimir Lenin, who advocated a tightly organized vanguard of professional revolutionaries; and the Mensheviks, led by Julius Martov and others, who favored a more moderate, broad-based model. Despite repeated attempts at reunification, the rift between Bolsheviks and Mensheviks widened, resulting in a formal split in 1912. The February Revolution of 1917 saw some Mensheviks support cooperation with the Provisional Government, which the Bolsheviks opposed in favor of "all power to the soviets". After the Bolsheviks seized power in the October Revolution later that year, the RSDLP was effectively dissolved.

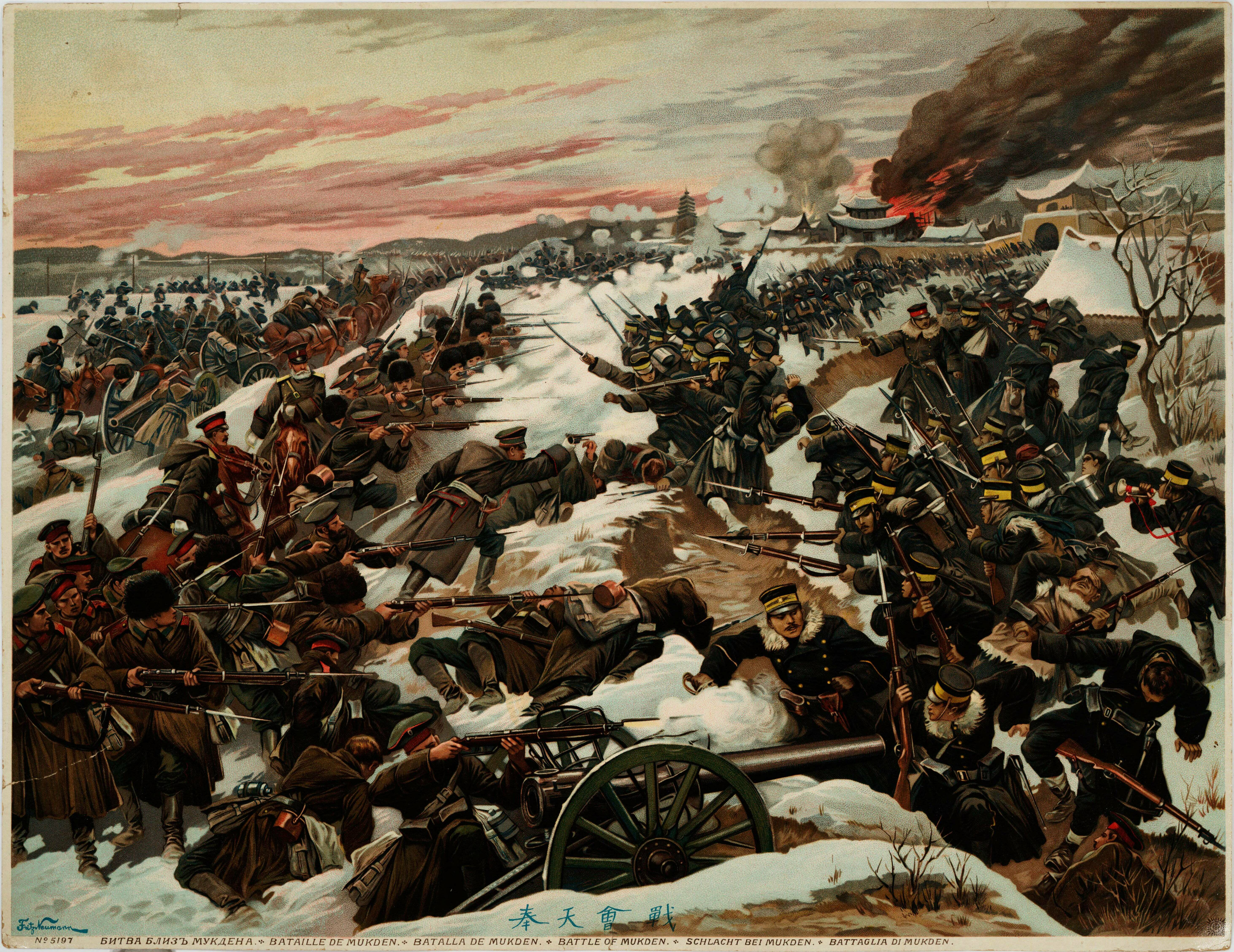
Russian soldiers in combat against Japanese at Mukden (inside China), during the Russo-Japanese War (1904–1905)

Defeat in the Russo-Japanese War (1904–1905) was a major blow to the tsarist regime and further increased the potential for unrest. In January 1905, an incident known as "Bloody Sunday" occurred when Father Georgy Gapon led an enormous crowd to the Winter Palace in Saint Petersburg to present a petition to the emperor. When the procession reached the palace, soldiers opened fire on the crowd, killing hundreds. The Russian masses were so furious over the massacre that a general strike was declared, which demanded a democratic republic. This marked the beginning of the Revolution of 1905. Soviets (councils of workers) appeared in most cities to direct revolutionary activity. Russia was paralyzed, and the government was desperate.

In October 1905, advised by Count Sergei Witte, Nicholas II reluctantly issued the October Manifesto, conceding basic civil liberties and creating an elected national parliament, the State Duma, without whose approval no law could take effect. While moderate liberals formed the Octobrist party in support of the manifesto, radical socialists rejected it and attempted further armed uprisings in Moscow. With the suppression of urban rebellions by late 1905, the crown reaffirmed supreme autocratic prerogatives in the Russian Constitution of 1906, retaining exclusive control over foreign policy, military affairs, and emergency decrees under Article 87.

=== War, revolution, and collapse ===
==== Origins and causes ====
Prior to World War I, Russia was part of the Triple Entente alongside Britain and the French Republic, formed to counterbalance the Triple Alliance of Germany, Austria-Hungary, and Italy. Anglo-Russian tensions over the Great Game in Central Asia subsided after the 1907 Anglo-Russian Convention, allowing both empires to align against German expansion. Russia had already formed a defensive partnership through the Franco-Russian Alliance in 1894.

Meanwhile, 19th-century alignments like the League of the Three Emperors dissolved. Relations with Berlin cooled, while rivalry with Austria-Hungary over Balkan influence peaked during the Bosnian Crisis of 1908 and the Balkan Wars of 1912–1913.

The June 1914 assassination of Archduke Franz Ferdinand triggered the July Crisis. Following Serbia's response to the Austro-Hungarian ultimatum, Vienna declared war on Serbia on 28 July 1914. As Serbia's ally and fellow Slavic power, Russia ordered general mobilization on 30 July to deter Austro-Hungarian aggression.

==== Declaration of War ====
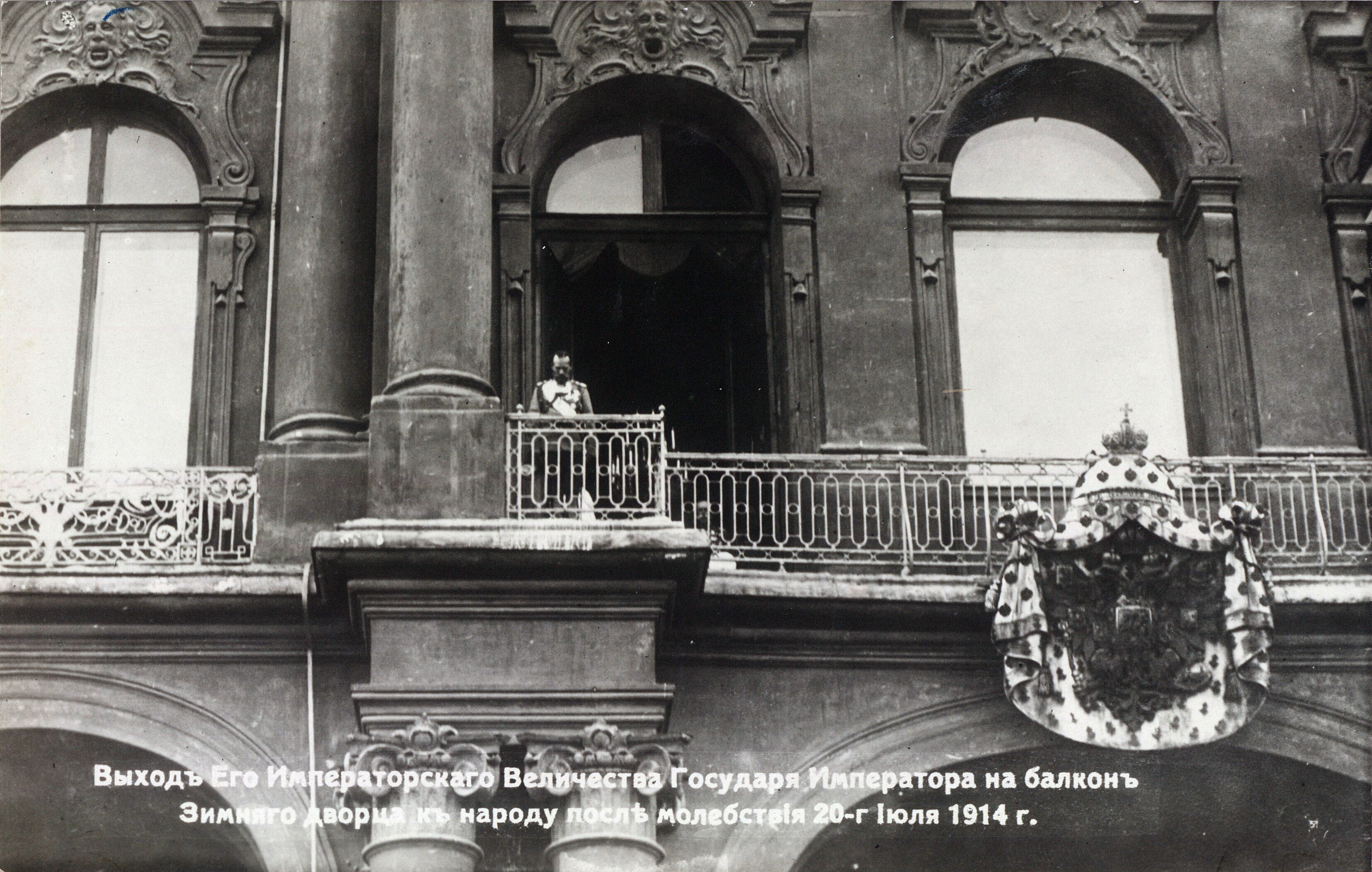
The Russian Emperor Nicholas II declared war on Germany, on the balcony of the Winter Palace, on 2 August 1914.

As a result of Austria-Hungary's declaration of war on Serbia, Nicholas II ordered the mobilization of 4.9 million soldiers. Germany, Austria-Hungary's ally, saw the call to arms as a threat, and declared war on 1 August 1914, and the Austro-Hungarian Empire followed suit by declaring war on Russia on 6 August. The outbreak of war fueled widespread anti-German sentiment, and the capital, Saint Petersburg, was renamed Petrograd.

The Russian entry into the First World War was followed by France. The German General Staff had devised the Schlieffen Plan, which first eliminated France via nonaligned Belgium before moving east to attack Russia, whose massive army was much slower to mobilize.

==== Theaters of operations ====
===== German front =====
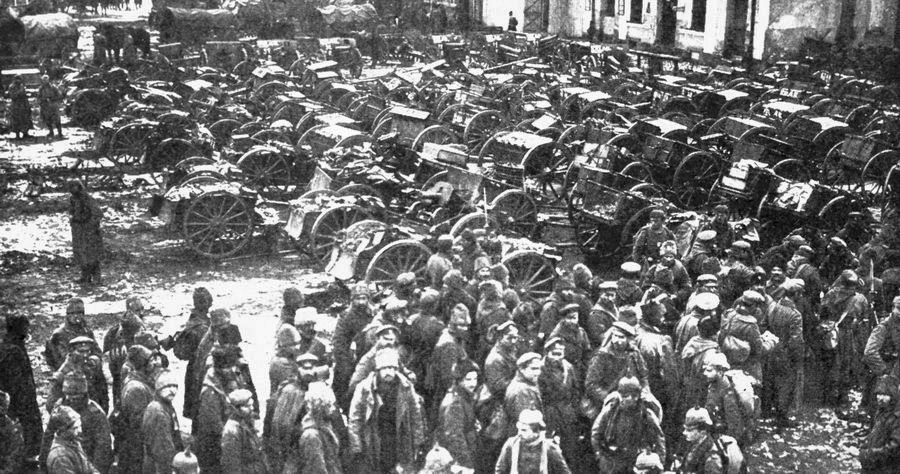
Russian POWs and equipment, which were captured by Germany after the Battle of Tannenberg, a major disaster for Russia

By August 1914, Russia had invaded with unexpected speed the German province of East Prussia, ending with a humiliating defeat at the Battle of Tannenberg, largely due to unencrypted radio transmissions, causing the destruction of the entire second army. Russia suffered a massive defeat at the Masurian Lakes twice, the first ending with a hundred thousand casualties; and the second suffering 200,000. By October, the German Ninth Army was near Warsaw, and the newly-formed Tenth Army had retreated from the frontier in East Prussia. Grand Duke Nicholas, the Russian commander-in-chief, now had the order to invade Silesia with his Fifth, Fourth, and Ninth armies. The Ninth Army, led by Mackensen, retreated from the frontline in Galicia and concentrated between the cities of Posen and Thorn. The advance took place on 11 November against the main army's right flank and rear; the First and Second armies were severely mauled, and the Second army was nearly surrounded in Łódź on 17 November.

Exhausted Russian troops began to withdraw from Russian-held Poland, allowing the Germans to capture many cities, including the kingdom's capital Warsaw on 5 August 1915. In the same month, the emperor dismissed Grand Duke Nicholas and took personal command; this was a turning point for the Russian army and the beginning of the worst disaster. Russia lost the entire territory of Poland and Lithuania, part of the Baltic region, Grodno, and parts of Volhynia and Podolia; thereafter the front with Germany remained relatively stable until 1917.

===== Austrian front =====
Austria-Hungary went to war with Russia on 6 August. The Russians started to invade Galicia, held by Austrian Cisleithania on 20 August, and annihilated the Austro-Hungarian Army at Lemberg, leading to the occupation of Galicia. While Przemyśl Fortress was besieged, the first attempt to capture the fortress failed, but the second attempt succeeded in March 1915. On 2 May, Russian lines were broken through by joint Austro-German forces, retreating from the Gorlice to Tarnów line and losing Przemyśl.

On 4 June 1916, General Aleksei Brusilov carried out an offensive by targeting Kovel. His offensive was a great success, taking 76,000 prisoners from the main attack and 1,500 from the Austrian bridgehead. But the offensive was halted by inadequate ammunition and a lack of supplies. The offensive was the most successful Allied operation of World War I, practically destroying the Austro-Hungarian army as an independent force, but suffering heavy casualties (approximately one million men) prevented Russian forces from launching further major attacks.

===== Turkish front =====
On 29 October 1914, a prelude to the Russo-Turkish front, the Turkish fleet, with German support, began to raid Russian coastal cities, including Odessa, Sevastopol, Novorossiysk, Feodosia, Kerch, and Yalta. This led Russia to declare war on the Ottoman Empire on 2 November. In December 1914, Russia obtained success at Sarikamish, where the Russian General Nikolai Yudenich routed Enver Pasha. Yudenich captured Köprüköy in January 1916 and captured Erzurum about one month later in February.

The Russian Navy's Black Sea Fleet was on the defensive in 1914, but this changed in the spring of 1915, when the high command ordered the fleet to attack the Turkish coast to assist the Western Entente landings in Gallipoli. The Russian naval raids failed to make any difference for the Gallipoli campaign, but they were very successful in disrupting coal shipments to Constantinople from other parts of Anatolia. The coal shortage caused by Russian submarine and destroyer attacks threatened the Ottoman Empire's continued participation in the war.

==== Problems in the empire ====
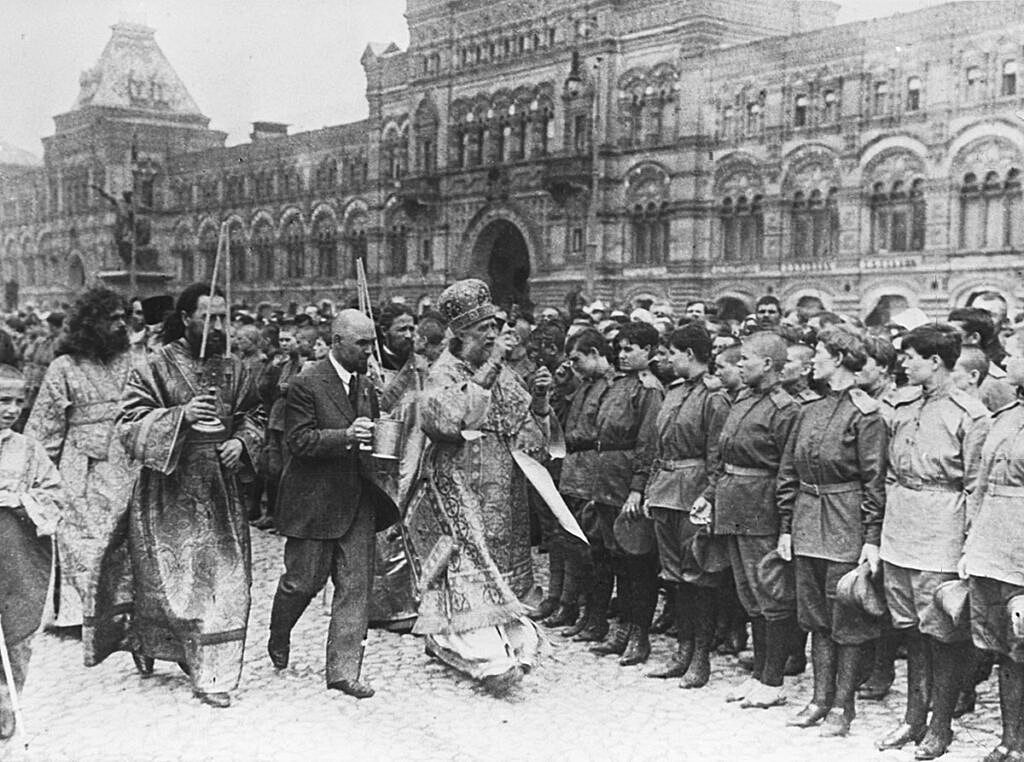
Patriarch Tikhon of Moscow in 1917

By mid-1915, the prolonged war produced profound domestic dislocation: refugee crises following the Great Retreat, acute rail transport bottlenecks, mounting inflation, and severe shortages of food and fuel in major urban centers. Industrial strikes escalated while peasant grain deliveries dropped. Nicholas II's decision in August 1915 to assume direct supreme military command tied the prestige of the monarchy directly to battlefield reverses, while leaving political governance in Petrograd under Empress Alexandra and the controversial influence of Grigori Rasputin. Rasputin's murder in December 1916 by conservative aristocrats failed to halt the erosion of the regime's authority.

==== End of imperial rule ====
On 8 March 1917, International Women's Day, a strike was organized at a factory in the capital, after which thousands of people took to the streets in Petrograd to protest food shortages. A day later, protesters rose to two hundred thousand, demanding that Russia withdraw from the war and the emperor be deposed. Eighty thousand Russian troops, half of the deployed army sent to restore order, had gone on strike and refused the senior officers' orders. Any imperial symbols were destroyed and burned. The capital was out of control and gripped by protest and strife.

In the city of Pskov, 262 km (163 mi) southwest from the capital, many generals and politicians advised the Emperor to abdicate in favor of the Tsarevich; Nicholas accepted, but he bequeathed the throne to Grand Duke Michael as his legitimate successor. Michael stated that he would only accept the throne if it would be offered by a constituent assembly. The form of political organization that emerged has been described as "dual power", with the Russian Provisional Government co-existing with the soviets. The constitutional framework of Russia remained in limbo until Alexander Kerensky finally confirmed Russia's status as a republic on 14 September [O.S. 1 September]. In July 1918, following the October Revolution, the Romanov family was murdered by the Bolsheviks in Yekaterinburg, marking the end of the imperial dynasty, as well as more than a millennium of Russian monarchy.

== Territory ==
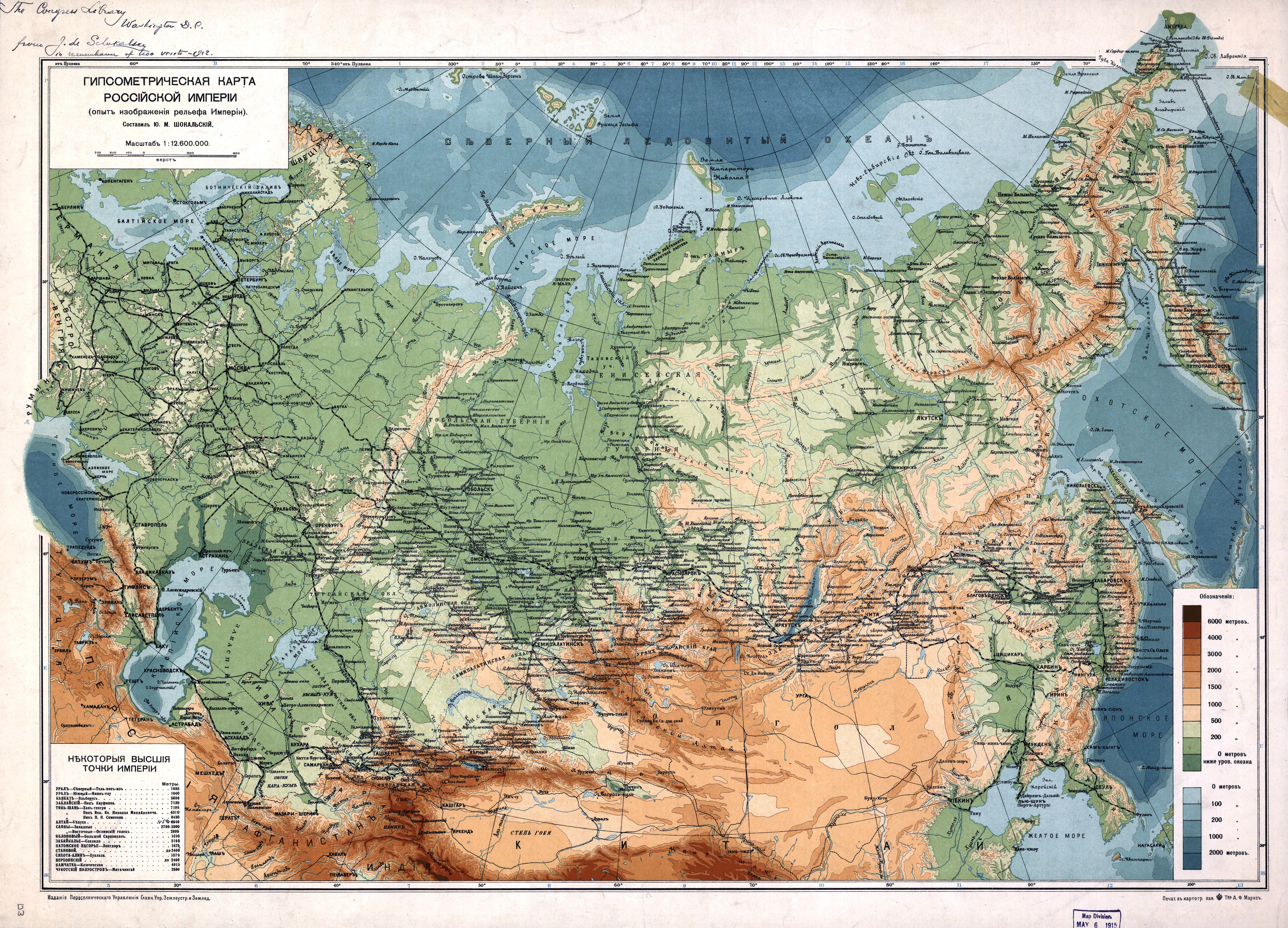
Topographic map of the Russian Empire in 1912

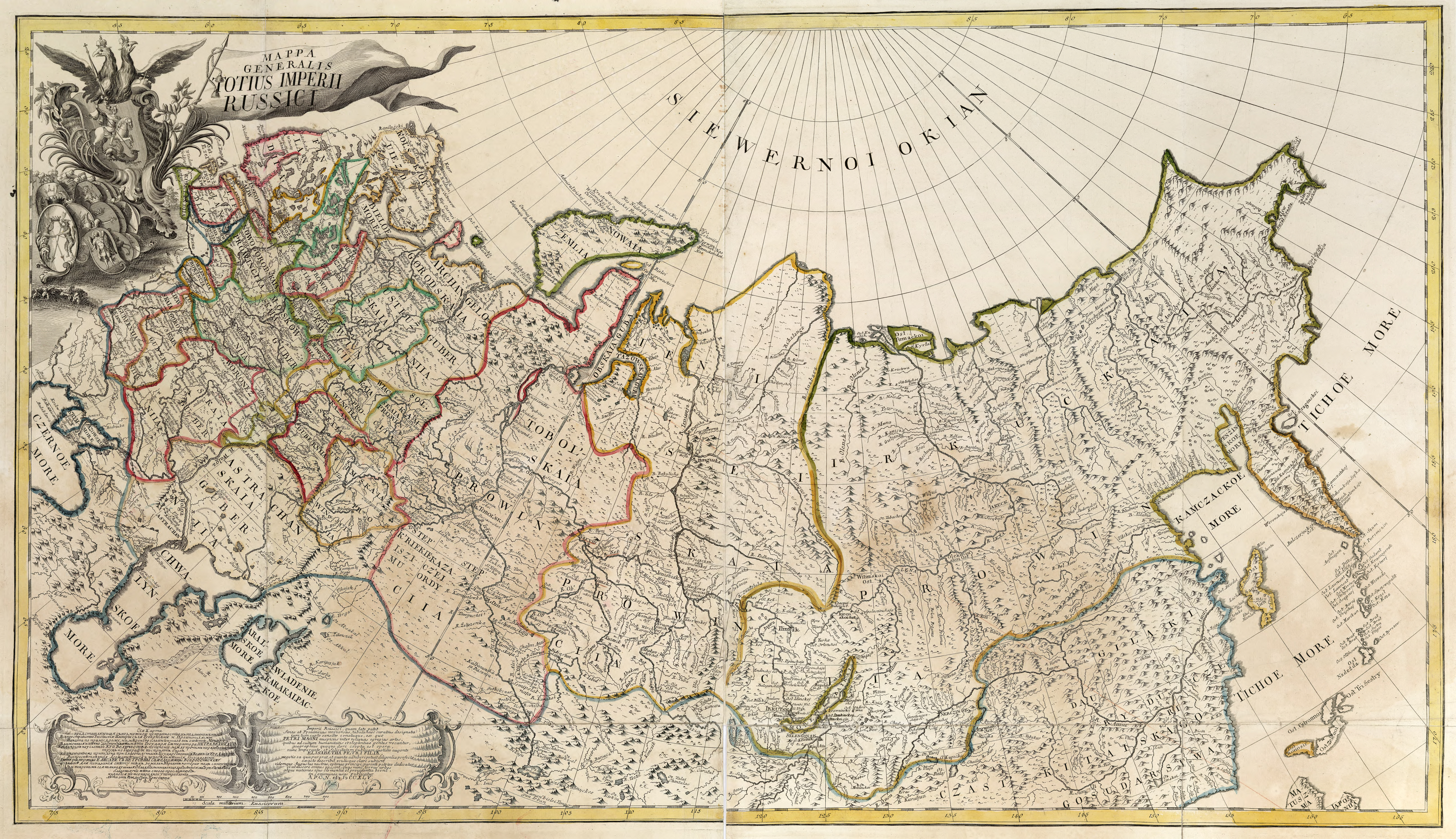
Map of the Russian Empire in 1745

By the end of the 19th century the area of the empire reached roughly 22,800,000 square kilometers (8,800,000 sq mi) (with land area often estimated at 22,400,000 km^{2} (8,600,000 sq mi)), or almost one-sixth of the Earth's landmass; its only rival in size at the time was the British Empire. The majority of the population lived in European Russia. More than 100 different ethnic groups lived in the Russian Empire, with ethnic Russians composing about 45% of the population.

=== Geography ===
The administrative boundaries of European Russia, excluding Finland and Congress Poland, coincided approximately with the East European Plain. To the north lay the Arctic Ocean, including Novaya Zemlya, Kolguyev, and Vaygach Island. To the east, European Russia was separated from Siberia and the Central Asian steppes by the Ural Mountains, the Ural River, and the Caspian Sea. To the south, European Russia was bounded by the Black Sea and the Caucasus Mountains, separated from the northern plains by the Kuma–Manych Depression. The western border ran from the Varangerfjord through the Baltic coast to the mouth of the Danube, bordering Prussia, Austrian Galicia, and Romania.

An important feature of the empire was its few free outlets to the open sea outside the icebound shores of the Arctic Ocean. The Gulfs of Bothnia and Finland were surrounded largely by Finnish territory, and it was at the head of the Gulf of Finland that the capital was established at the mouth of the Neva river. The Gulf of Riga and the Baltic coast were inhabited predominantly by Baltic and Finnic peoples, as well as Germans. To the south, the Black Sea was an inland sea whose only outlet, the Bosphorus, was held by the Ottoman Empire, while the landlocked Caspian Sea served mainly as a link between Russia and its Asian territories instead of a route for foreign trade.

=== Territorial development ===
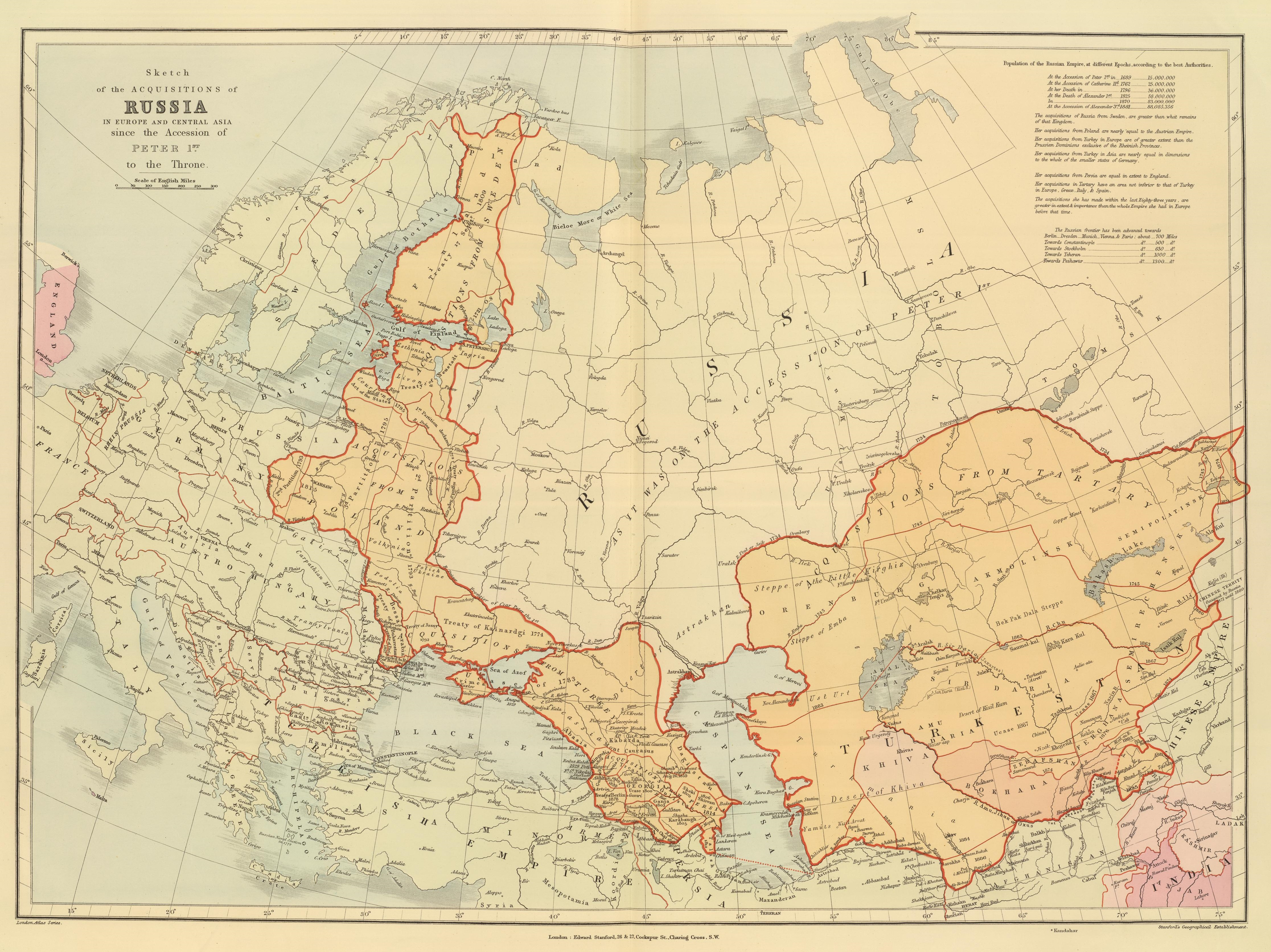
Acquisitions of Russia in Europe and Central Asia from 1700 to 1900

From 1860 to 1905, the Russian Empire occupied all territories of the present-day Russian Federation, with the exception of the present-day Kaliningrad Oblast, Kuril Islands and Tuva. In 1905 Russia lost southern Sakhalin to Japan, but gained Tuva as a protectorate in 1914. Prior to 1917 the Russian Empire included most of Dnieper Ukraine, Belarus (part of former Grand Duchy of Lithuania), Bessarabia, the Grand Duchy of Finland, Armenia, Azerbaijan, Georgia, the Central Asian states of Russian Turkestan, most of the Baltic Governorates, a significant part of Poland, and the former Ottoman territories of Ardahan, Artvin, Kars, and the northeastern part of Erzurum Province.

In his 1864 circular, Foreign Minister Alexander Gorchakov justified Russian expansion into Central Asia by comparing it to the westward expansion of the United States and European conquests in Asia and North Africa, arguing that imperial powers were inevitably compelled to secure volatile frontier regions against nomadic raids.

Between 1799 and 1867, the Russian-American Company administered Alaska as a colony. The company also established settlements in Hawaii, including Fort Elizabeth (1817), and as far south in North America as Fort Ross Colony (established in 1812) in Sonoma County, California just north of San Francisco. Both Fort Ross and the Russian River in California got their names from Russian settlers, who had staked claims in a region claimed until 1821 by the Spanish as part of New Spain.

Following the Swedish defeat in the Finnish War of 1808–1809 and the signing of the Treaty of Fredrikshamn on 17 September 1809, the eastern half of Sweden, the area that then became Finland, was incorporated into the Russian Empire as an autonomous grand duchy. The emperor eventually ended up ruling Finland as a semi-constitutional monarch through the Governor-General of Finland and a native Senate appointed by him. The emperor never explicitly recognized Finland as a constitutional state in its own right, although his Finnish subjects came to consider the grand duchy as such.

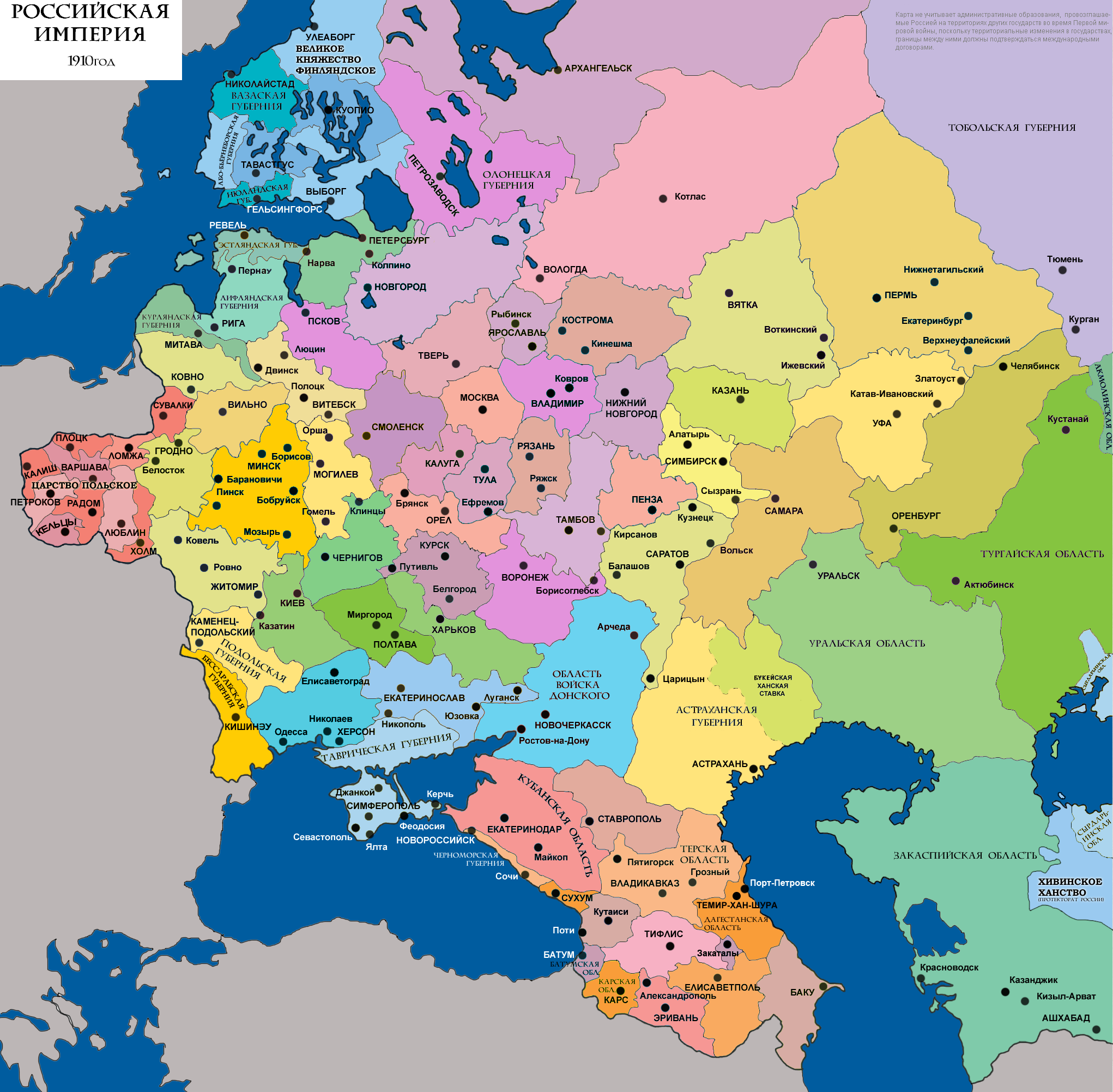
Map of governorates of the western Russian Empire in 1910

In the aftermath of the Russo-Turkish War (1806–1812), and the ensuing Treaty of Bucharest (1812), the eastern parts of the Principality of Moldavia, an Ottoman vassal state, along with some areas formerly under direct Ottoman rule, came under the rule of the empire. This area (Bessarabia) was among the Russian Empire's last territorial acquisitions in Europe. At the Congress of Vienna (1815), Russia gained sovereignty over Congress Poland, which on paper was an autonomous kingdom in personal union with Russia. However, this autonomy was eroded after the November Uprising in 1831, and was finally abolished in 1867.

Saint Petersburg gradually extended and consolidated its control over the Caucasus in the course of the 19th century, at the expense of Persia through the Russo-Persian War (1804–13) and Russo-Persian War (1826–28) and the respectively ensuing treaties of Gulistan and Turkmenchay, as well as through the Caucasian War (1817–1864).

The Russian Empire expanded its influence and possessions in Central Asia, especially in the later 19th century, conquering much of Russian Turkestan in 1865 and continuing to add territory as late as 1885.

Newly discovered Arctic islands became part of the Russian Empire: the New Siberian Islands from the early 18th century; Severnaya Zemlya ("Emperor Nicholas II Land") first mapped and claimed as late as 1913.

During World War I, Russia briefly occupied a small part of East Prussia, then a part of Germany; a significant portion of Austrian Galicia; and significant portions of Ottoman Armenia. While the modern Russian Federation currently controls the Kaliningrad Oblast, which comprised the northern part of East Prussia, this differs from the area captured by the empire in 1914, though there was some overlap: Gusev (Gumbinnen in German) was the site of the initial Russian victory.

=== Imperial territories ===
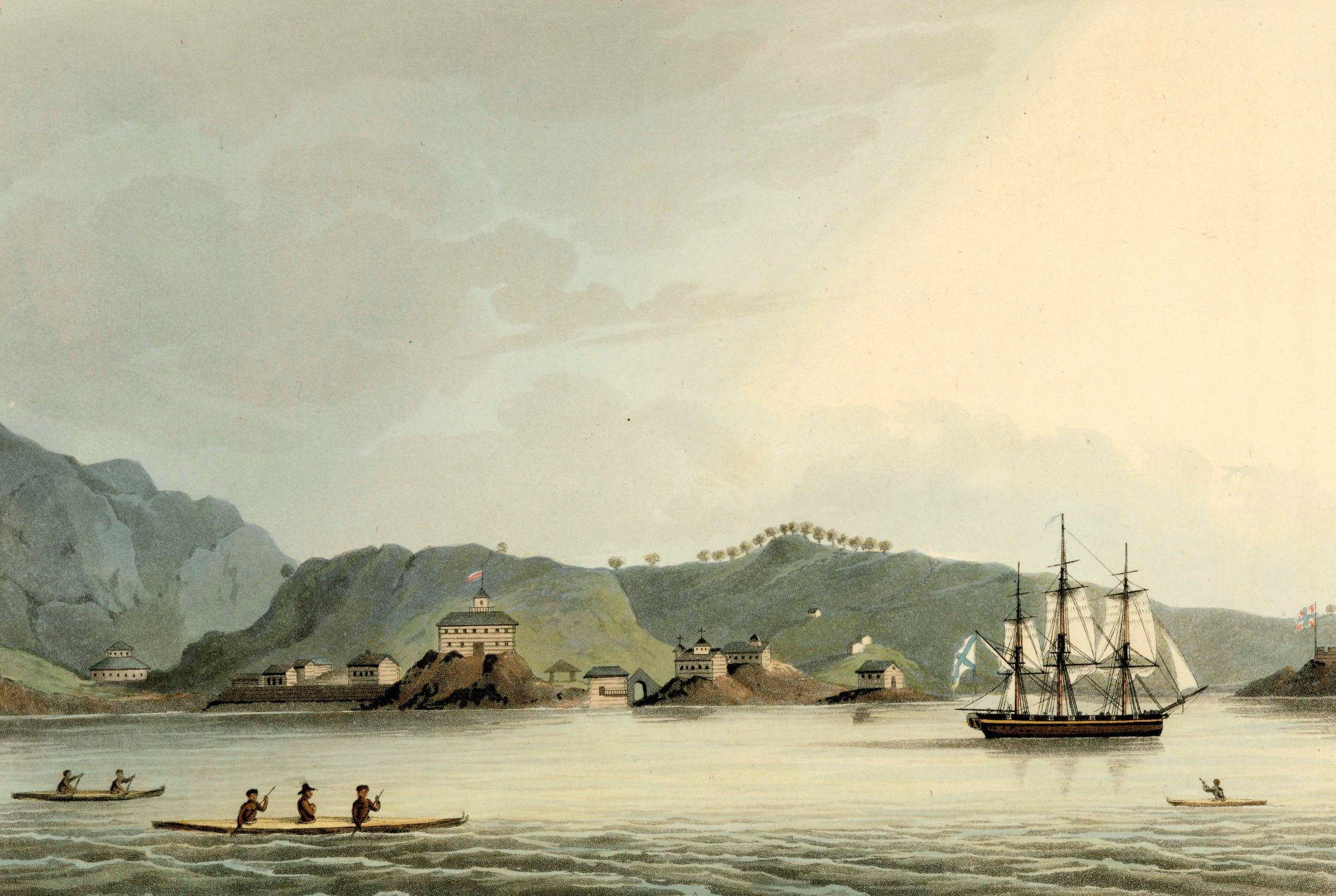
1814 artwork depicting the Russian warship Neva and the Russian settlement of St. Paul's Harbor (present-day Kodiak town), Kodiak Island

According to the 1st article of the Organic Law, the Russian Empire was one indivisible state. In addition, the 26th article stated that "With the Imperial Russian throne are indivisible the Kingdom of Poland and Grand Principality of Finland". Relations with the Grand Principality of Finland were also regulated by the 2nd article, "The Grand Principality of Finland, constituted an indivisible part of the Russian state, in its internal affairs governed by special regulations at the base of special laws", and by the law of 10 June 1910.

Between 1799 and 1867, the empire formally controlled Russian America. With the exception of this territory – modern-day Alaska – the Russian Empire was a contiguous mass of land spanning Europe and Asia. In this it differed from contemporary colonial-style empires. The result of this was that, while the British and French empires declined in the 20th century, a large portion of the Russian Empire's territory remained together, first within the Soviet Union, and after 1991 in the smaller Russian Federation.

Furthermore, the empire held leaseholds and concessions in Qing China, notably the Kwantung Leased Territory (including the naval base at Port Arthur) and the Chinese Eastern Railway zone across Manchuria, as well as the Russian concession of Tianjin.

In 1815, Georg Anton Schäffer, an agent of the Russian-American Company, reached Kauai and negotiated a protectorate agreement with local ruler Kaumualii, but Emperor Alexander I declined ratification to avoid diplomatic conflict with Great Britain and the United States.

In 1889, adventurer Nikolay Ivanovitch Achinov led an unauthorized expedition to establish an outpost named New Moscow at Sagallo on the Gulf of Tadjoura (modern Djibouti). Because the territory was claimed by the French Somaliland protectorate, French naval gunboats bombarded the settlement after Achinov refused to surrender; the survivors were arrested and deported to Russia, where the tsarist government disavowed the venture.

== Government and administration ==
From its initial proclamation in 1721 until the Russian Revolution of 1905, the Russian Empire was led by an emperor (also referred to as tsar), who ruled as an absolute monarch. The adoption of the Russian Constitution of 1906 marked an important step toward constitutionalism in Russia: while the emperor retained the legal title and status of autocrat, his legislative monopoly was ended as laws now required the approval of the elected parliament. Nevertheless, the form of government is best described as a semi-constitutional monarchy. The emperor retained ultimate authority, including an absolute veto over legislation, the right to promulgate exceptional decrees, control of foreign affairs, and special prerogatives in defense legislation. The Almanach de Gotha, which had previously described Russia as "a hereditary monarchy", thereafter referred to it as "a constitutional monarchy under an autocratic tsar".

Most Russian leaders adhered to a kind of conservatism or traditionalism, albeit accommodating occasional reform. This conservatism was premised on the anti-rationalism of intellectuals, religiosity of the Russian Orthodox Church, traditionalism rooted in the landed estates worked by serfs, and militarism of the army officer corps. Official imperial ideology generally rejected Western European rationalism in favor of romantic nationalism and religious orthodoxy, framing the autocratic monarchy as the only natural political order for Russian society. A conservative notion of modernization based on the incorporation of modern technology to serve the established system replaced the liberal notion of "progress". The promise of modernization in the service of autocracy frightened socialist intellectual Alexander Herzen, who warned of a Russia governed by "Genghis Khan with a telegraph".

=== Emperor ===
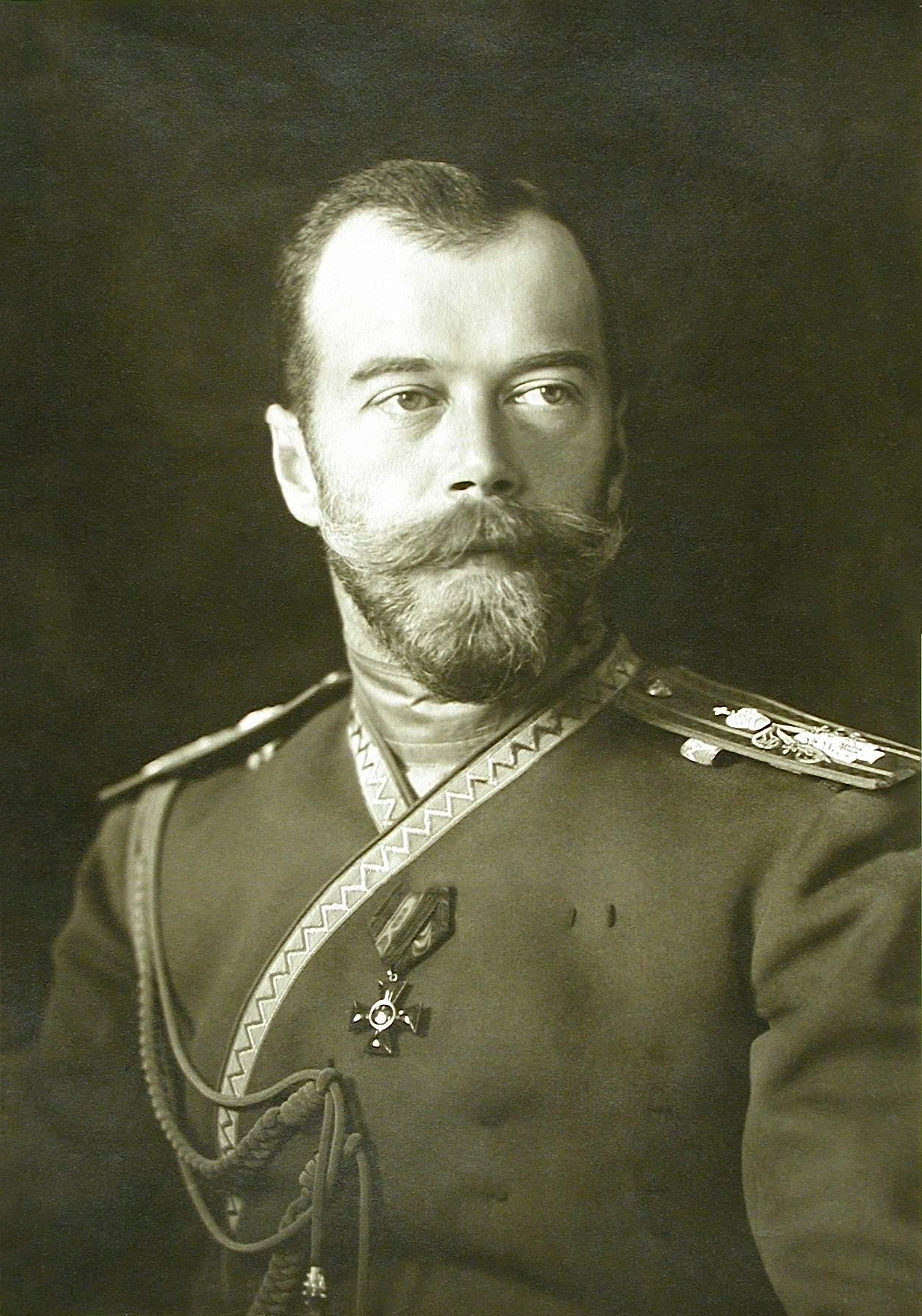
Nicholas II was the last emperor of Russia, reigning from 1894 to 1917.

Peter the Great changed his title from tsar to emperor in order to secure Russia's position in the European states system. While later rulers did not discard the new title, the Russian monarch was commonly known as the tsar or tsaritsa until the imperial system was abolished following the February Revolution of 1917. Prior to the issuance of the October Manifesto, the emperor ruled as an absolute monarch, subject to only two limitations on his authority, both of which were intended to protect the existing system: the emperor and his consort must both belong to the Russian Orthodox Church, and he must obey the Pauline Laws of succession established by Paul I. Beyond this, the power of the Russian autocrat was virtually limitless.

On 17 October 1905, the situation changed: the ruler voluntarily limited his legislative power by decreeing that no measure was to become law without the consent of the Imperial Duma, a freely elected national assembly established by the Organic Law issued on 28 April 1906. However, he retained the right to disband the newly established Duma, and he exercised this right more than once. He also retained an absolute veto over all legislation, and only he could initiate any changes to the Organic Law itself. His ministers were responsible solely to him, and not to the Duma or any other authority, which could question but not remove them. Thus, while the emperor's personal powers were limited in scope after 28 April 1906, they remained formidable.

=== State Council ===
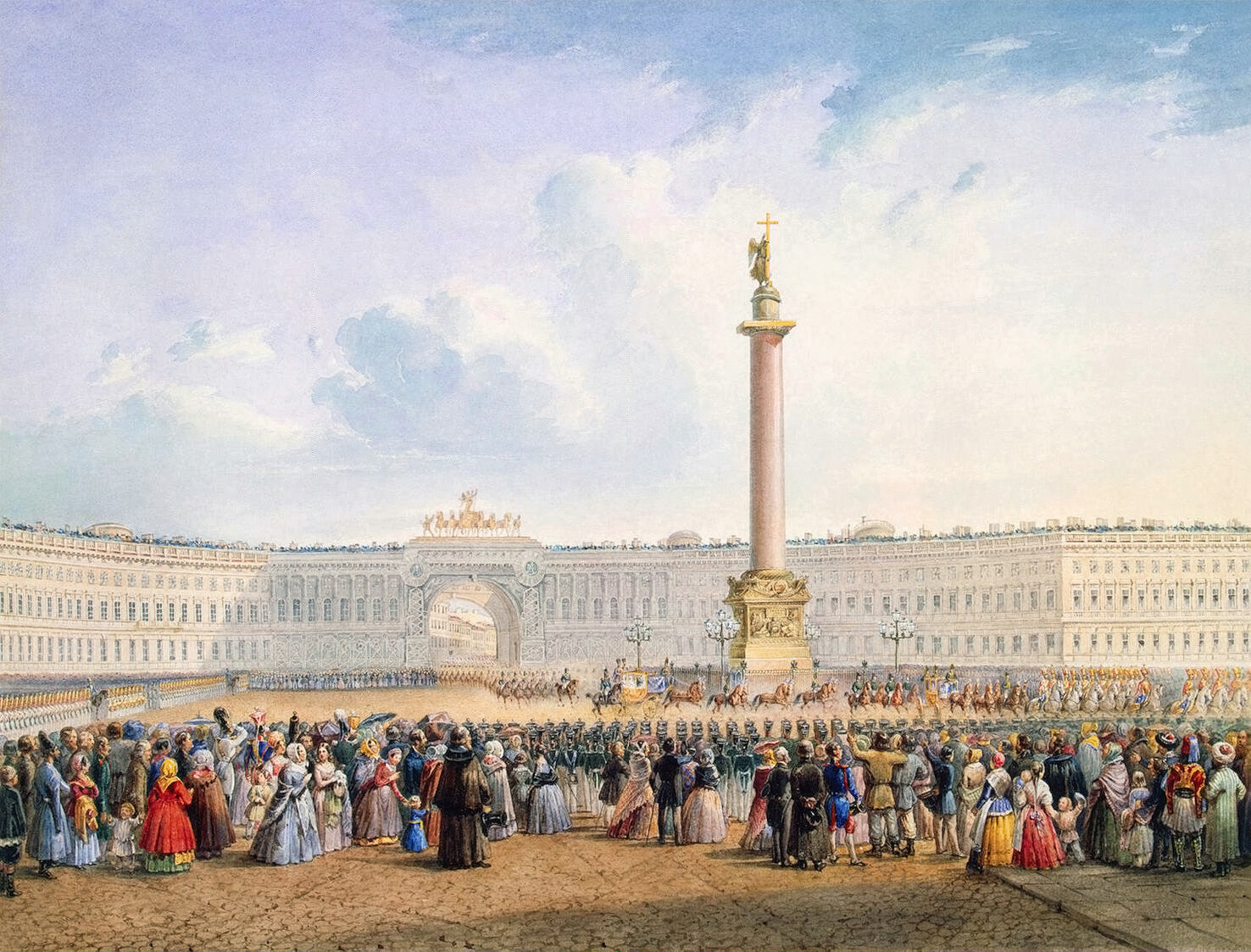
This painting from c. 1847 depicts the General Staff Building opposite the Winter Palace, which was the headquarters of the Army General Staff. Today, it houses the headquarters of the Western Military District/Joint Strategic Command West.

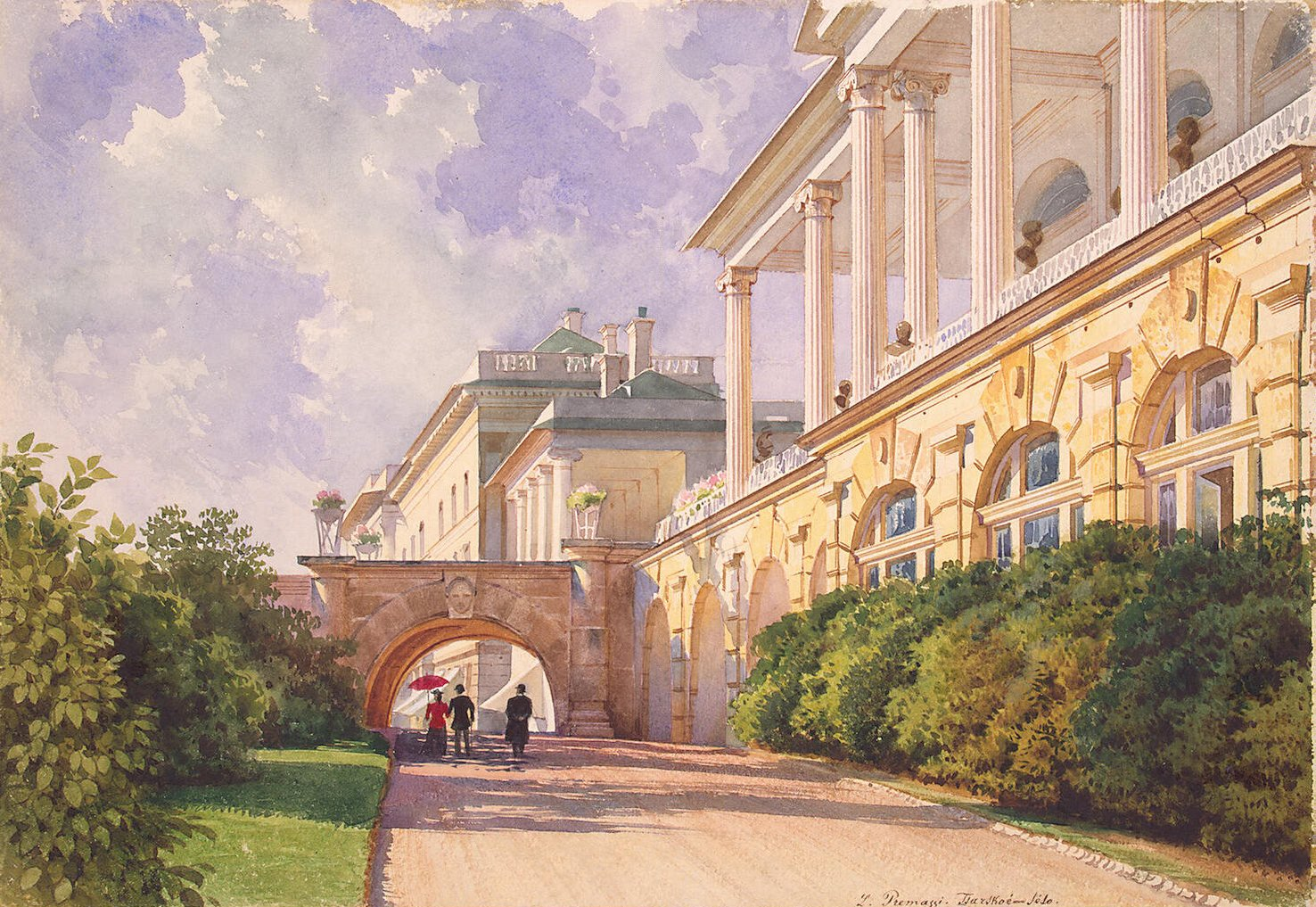
The Catherine Palace, located at Tsarskoe Selo, was the summer residence of the imperial family. It is named after Empress Catherine I, who reigned from 1725 to 1727 (watercolor painting from the 19th century).

Under Russia's revised Fundamental Law of 20 February 1906, the State Council was associated with the Duma as a legislative upper house; from this time the legislative power was exercised normally by the emperor only in concert with the two chambers. The Council of the Empire, or Imperial Council, as reconstituted for this purpose, consisted of 196 members, of whom 98 were nominated by the emperor, while 98 were elective. The ministers, also nominated, were ex officio members. Of the elected members, 3 were returned by the "black" clergy (the monks), 3 by the "white" clergy (secular), 18 by the corporations of nobles, 6 by the academy of sciences and the universities, 6 by the chambers of commerce, 6 by the industrial councils, 34 by local governmental zemstvos, 16 by local governments having no zemstvos, and 6 by Poland. As a legislative body the powers of the council were coordinate with those of the Duma; in practice, however, it seldom if ever initiated legislation.

=== State Duma ===
The Imperial Duma or State Duma (Gosudarstvennaya Duma), which formed the lower house of the Russian parliament, consisted (since the electoral law of 16 June [O.S. 3 June] 1907) of 442 members, elected by an exceedingly complicated franchise. The membership was manipulated to secure an overwhelming majority of wealthy landholders and ethnic Russian representatives at the expense of subject nationalities. Each province of the empire, except Central Asia, returned a set number of deputies, alongside representatives from several major cities. Members were chosen through electoral colleges, which were elected by three broad curiae: landed proprietors, urban property owners, and peasants.

Voting in the electoral colleges was conducted by secret ballot, with a simple majority deciding each seat. Because conservative elements dominated the colleges, progressive and socialist parties had limited representation. The few radical delegates largely owed their seats to direct representation granted to the empire's seven largest cities—Saint Petersburg, Moscow, Kiev, Odessa, Riga, Warsaw, and Łódź—though even there the electorate was stratified by property qualifications.

=== Council of Ministers ===
In 1905, the Council of Ministers (Sovet Ministrov) was created, under a minister president, the first appearance of a prime minister in Russia. This council consisted of all the ministers and of the heads of other principal departments. The ministries were as follows:

- Ministry of the Imperial Court
- Ministry of Foreign Affairs;
- Ministry of War;
- Ministry of the Navy;
- Ministry of Finance;
- Ministry of Commerce and Industry (created in 1905);
- Ministry of Internal Affairs (including police, health, censorship and press, posts and telegraphs, foreign religions, statistics);
- Ministry of Agriculture and State Assets;
- Ministry of Ways of Communications;
- Ministry of Justice;
- Ministry of National Education.

=== Most Holy Synod ===
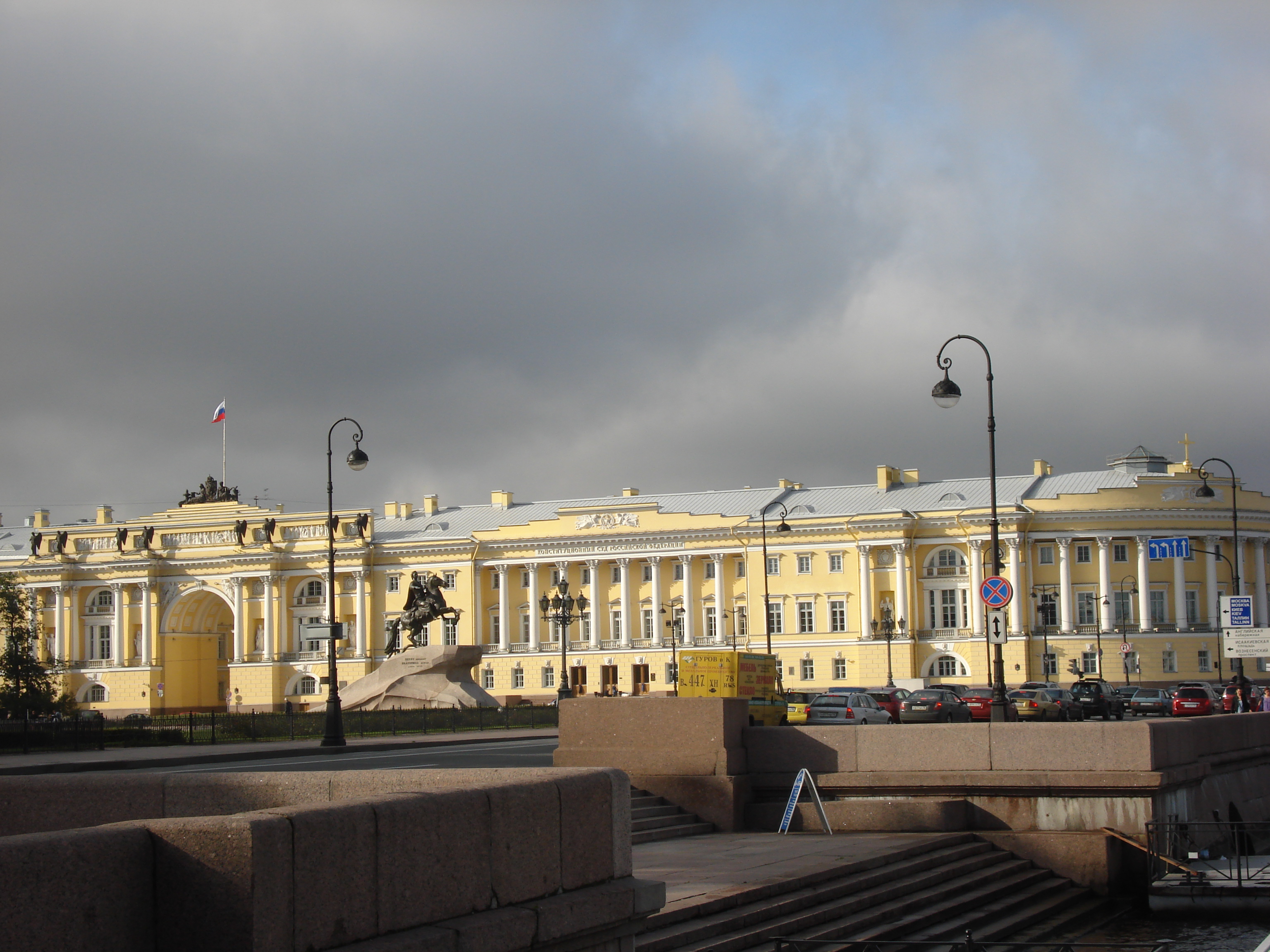
The Senate and Synod headquarters – today the Constitutional Court of the Russian Federation on Senate Square in Saint Petersburg

The Most Holy Synod, established in 1721, was the supreme organ of government of the Russian Orthodox Church. It was presided over by a lay procurator, representing the emperor, and consisted of the three metropolitans of Moscow, Saint Petersburg, and Kiev, the Archbishop of Georgia, and a number of bishops sitting in rotation.

=== Senate ===
The Governing Senate (Pravitelstvuyushchi Senat), originally established during the government reform of Peter the Great, consisted of members nominated by the emperor. Its wide variety of functions were carried out by the different departments into which it was divided. It was the supreme court of cassation; an audit office; a high court of justice for all political offences; and one of its departments fulfilled the functions of a heralds' college. It also had supreme jurisdiction in all disputes arising out of the administration of the empire, notably in differences between representatives of the central power and the elected organs of local self-government. Lastly, it promulgated new laws, a function which theoretically gave it a power akin to that of the Supreme Court of the United States, of rejecting measures not in accordance with fundamental laws.

=== Administrative divisions ===
Map showing subdivisions of the Russian Empire in 1914

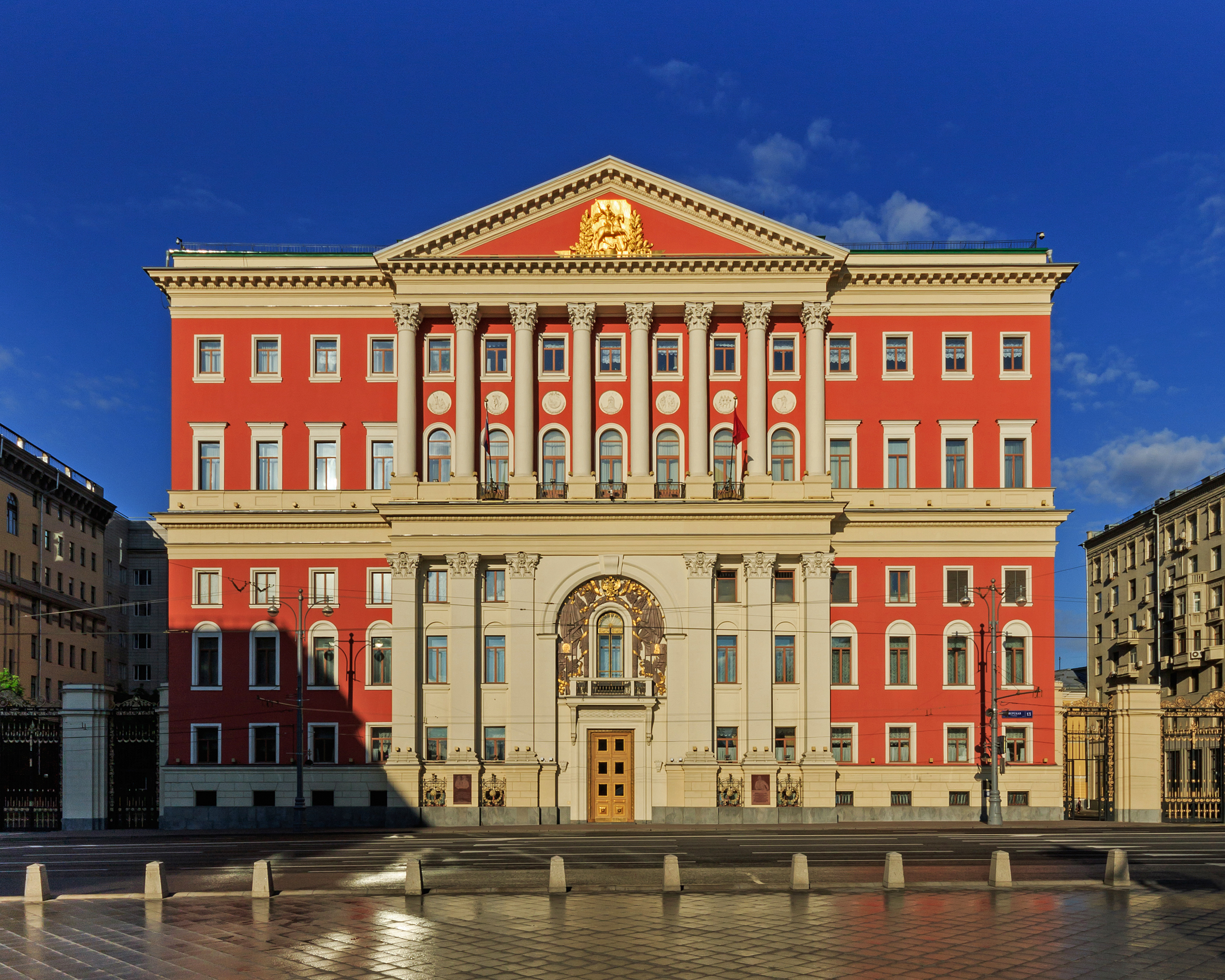
Residence of the governor of Moscow (1778–82) as seen in 2015

Russia was a unitary state. As of 1914, the empire was divided into 78 governorates (gubernii), 21 oblasts, and 2 okrugs. Vassals and protectorates included the Emirate of Bukhara, the Khanate of Khiva, and, after 1914, Tuva (Uriankhai). The Don Host Oblast was under the direct jurisdiction of the ministry of war; the rest each had a governor and deputy-governor, the latter presiding over the administrative council. In addition, there were governors-general, generally placed over several governorates and armed with more extensive powers, usually including the command of the troops within the limits of their jurisdiction. In 1906, there were governors-general in Finland, Warsaw, Vilna, Kiev, Moscow, and Riga. The larger cities (Saint Petersburg, Moscow, Odessa, Sevastopol, Kerch, Nikolayev, and Rostov) had administrative systems of their own, independent of the governorates; in these the chief of police acted as governor.

== Judicial system ==
The judicial system of the Russian Empire was established by the statute of 20 November 1864 of Alexander II. This system – based partly on English and French law – was predicated on the separation of judicial and administrative functions, the independence of the judges and courts, public trials and oral procedure, and the equality of all classes before the law. Moreover, a democratic element was introduced by the adoption of the jury system and the election of judges. This system was disliked by the bureaucracy, due to its putting the administration of justice outside of the executive sphere. During the late reign of Alexander II and under Alexander III, judicial independence was progressively curtailed, though several of these restrictions were rolled back by the Third Duma following the 1905 Revolution. (Note: A ukaz of 1879 gave the governors the right to report secretly on the qualifications of candidates for the office of justice of the peace. In 1889, Alexander III abolished the election of justices of the peace, except in certain large towns and some outlying parts of the Empire, and greatly restricted the right of trial by jury. The combining of judicial and administrative functions was introduced again by the appointment of officials as judges. In 1909, the third Duma restored the election of justices of the peace.)

The system established by the law of 1864 had two wholly separate tribunals, each having their own courts of appeal and coming in contact with each other only in the Senate, which acted as the supreme court of cassation. The first tribunal, based on the English model, were the courts of the elected justices of the peace, with jurisdiction over petty causes, whether civil or criminal; the second, based on the French model, were the ordinary tribunals of nominated judges, sitting with or without a jury to hear important cases.

== Local administration ==
Alongside the local organs of the central government in Russia, there were three classes of local elected bodies charged with administrative functions:

- the peasant assemblies in the mirs and the volosts;
- the zemstvos in the 34 governorates of Russia;
- the municipal dumas.

=== Municipal dumas ===
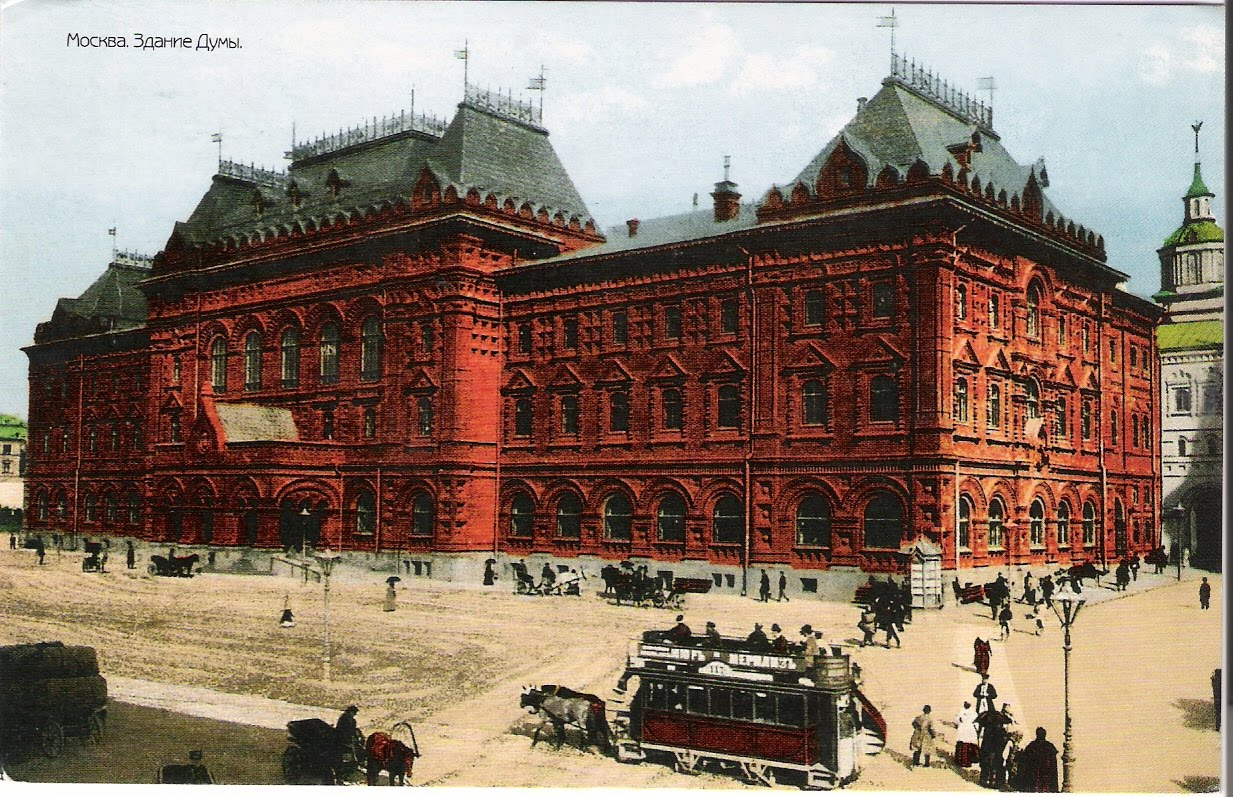
The Moscow City Duma c. 1900 (colorized photograph)

Since 1870, the municipalities in European Russia had institutions like those of the zemstvos. All owners of houses, tax-paying merchants, artisans, and workmen were enrolled on lists, in descending order according to their assessed wealth. The total valuation was then divided into three equal parts, representing three groups of electors very unequal in number, each of which would elect an equal number of delegates to the municipal duma. The executive was in the hands of an elected mayor and an uprava, which consisted of several members elected by the municipal duma. However, under Alexander III, through bylaws promulgated in 1892 and 1894, the municipal dumas were subordinated to the governors in the same way as the zemstvos. In 1894, municipal institutions, with still more restricted powers, were granted to several towns in Siberia, and in 1895 to some in the Caucasus.

=== Baltic provinces ===
The formerly Swedish-controlled Baltic provinces of Livonia and Estonia, along with the Duchy of Courland, were incorporated into the empire following the Great Northern War and the Third Partition of Poland. Under the 1721 Treaty of Nystad, the Baltic German nobility retained wide autonomy, religious freedom for Lutheranism, and German as the administrative language.

In the late 1880s, the imperial government enacted policies transferring judicial and police administration from local Baltic German manorial courts to central crown officials. This was accompanied by state-directed Russification, mandating the Russian language in provincial administration, secondary schools, and the Imperial University of Dorpat, which was renamed Yuryev in 1893.

== Economy ==
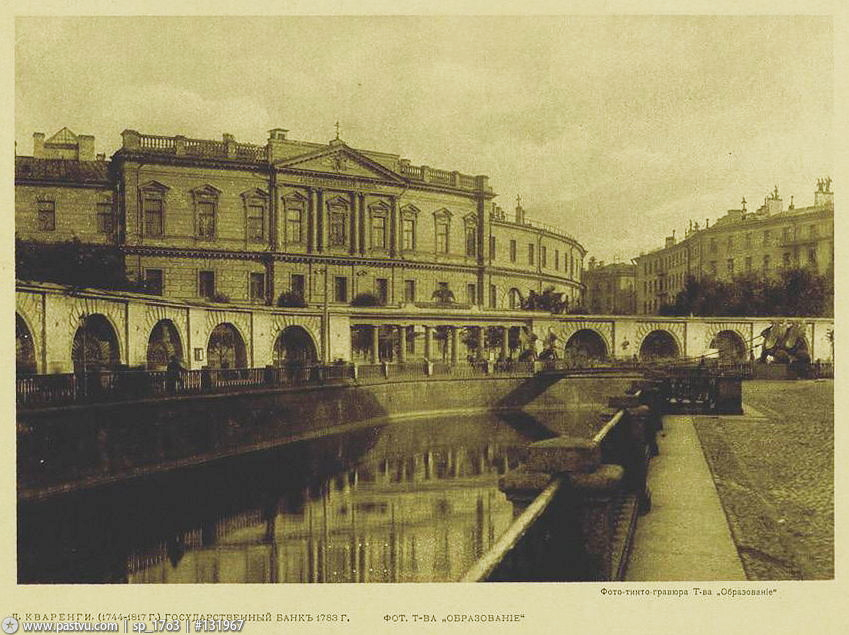
The State Bank of the Russian Empire was founded in 1860 as a central bank structure (headquarters in Saint Petersburg, photographed in 1905).

Before the abolition of serfdom in 1861, Russia's economy mainly depended on agriculture. By c. 1800, roughly 95% of the Russian population lived in the countryside. Nicholas I had attempted to modernize the country and reduce its economic dependence on agriculture. During the reign of Alexander III, many reforms occurred. The Peasants' Land Bank was founded in 1883 to provide loans for Russian peasants, both as individuals and in communes. The Nobles' Land Bank, in 1885, made loans at nominal interest rates to the landed nobility. The poll tax was abolished in 1886.

When Ivan Vyshnegradsky was appointed as the new minister of finance in 1886, he increased the pressure on peasants by increasing taxes on land and prescribing how they harvested grain. These policies led to the severe Russian famine of 1891–1892, with four hundred thousand perishing from starvation. Vyshnegradsky was succeeded by Count Sergei Witte in 1892. Witte began by raising revenues through a state monopoly on alcohol, which brought in 300 million rubles in 1894. In 1900, a wealthy peasant class (kulaks) had emerged, representing less than 20% of the population. An income tax was introduced in 1916. Historical national accounts indicate that between 1885 and 1913, real national income grew at an average rate of roughly 3.3% annually, keeping pace with contemporaneous Western industrial growth, though rapid demographic growth kept per capita output at roughly one-third to one-half of Western European levels.

=== Agriculture ===
The agrarian economy rested on large estates worked by serfs under two primary obligations: barshchina (compulsory labor dues) and obrok (quitrent in cash or kind, which allowed peasants to take outside work). The legal foundations of serfdom had been formalized in the Sobornoye Ulozheniye of 1649 under Tsar Alexis.

The 1891–1892 famine caused severe agricultural disruption, particularly across the Volga region, which experienced a sharp decline in grain production.

=== Mining and heavy industry ===
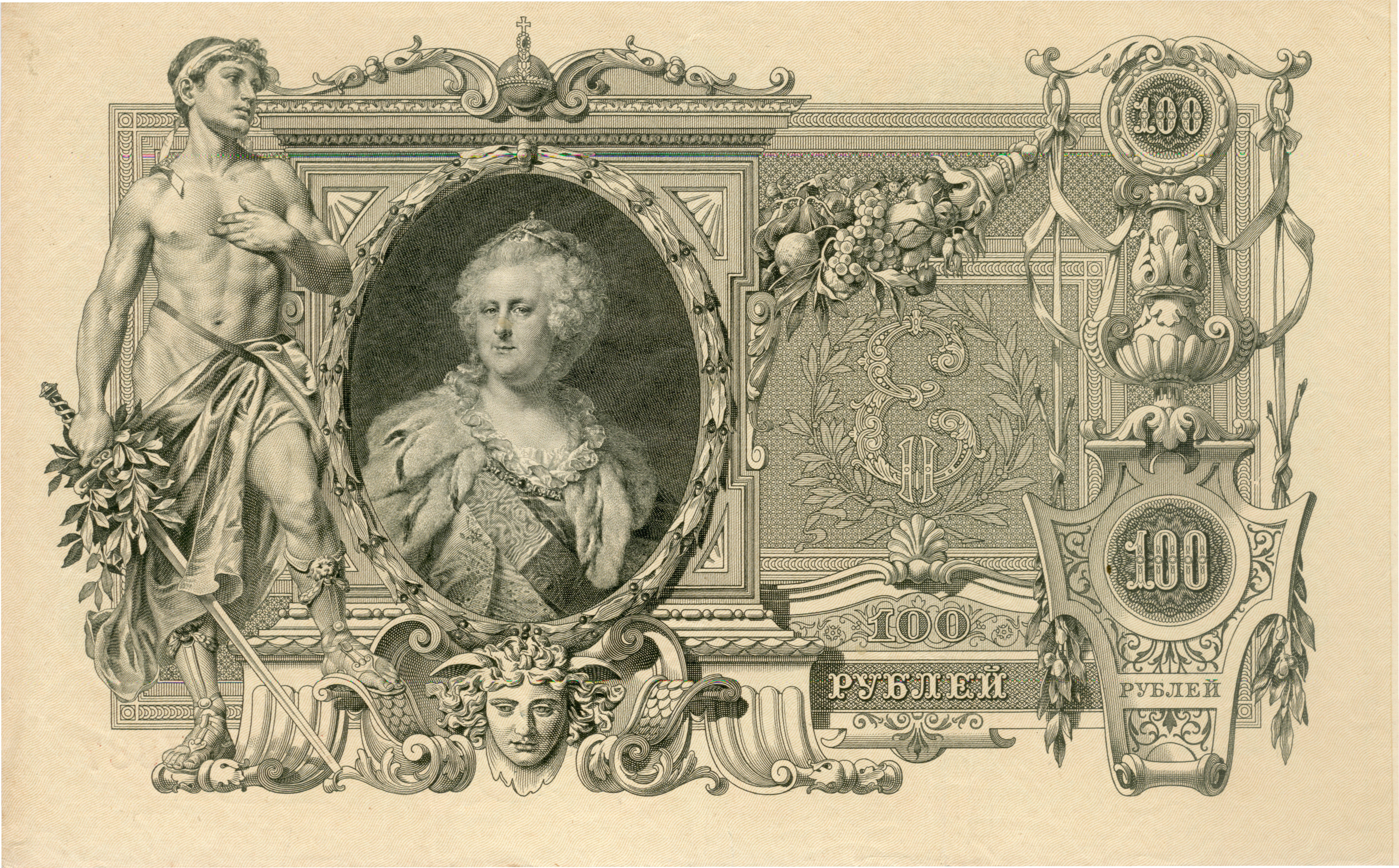
100 ruble banknote (1910)

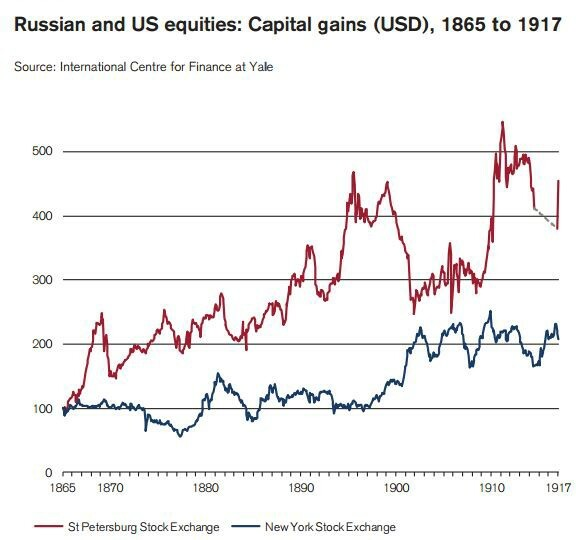
Russian and US equities, 1865 to 1917

Output in 1912 of mining and heavy industries of the Russian Empire, as a percentage of national output, by region.
	Ural Region	Southern Region	Caucasus	Siberia	Kingdom of Poland
Gold	11.8%	–	–	88.2%	–
Platinum	100%	–	–	–	–
Silver	36%	–	24.3%	29.3%	–
Lead	5.8%	–	92%	–	0.9%
Zinc	–	–	25.2%	–	74.8%
Copper	54.9%	–	30.2%	14.9%	–
Pig Iron	19.4%	67.7%	–	–	9.3%
Iron and Steel	17.3%	36.2%	–	–	10.8%
Manganese	0.3%	29.2%	70.3%	–	–
Coal	3.4%	67.3%	–	5.8%	22.3%
Petroleum	–	–	96%	–	–

== Infrastructure ==
=== Rail ===
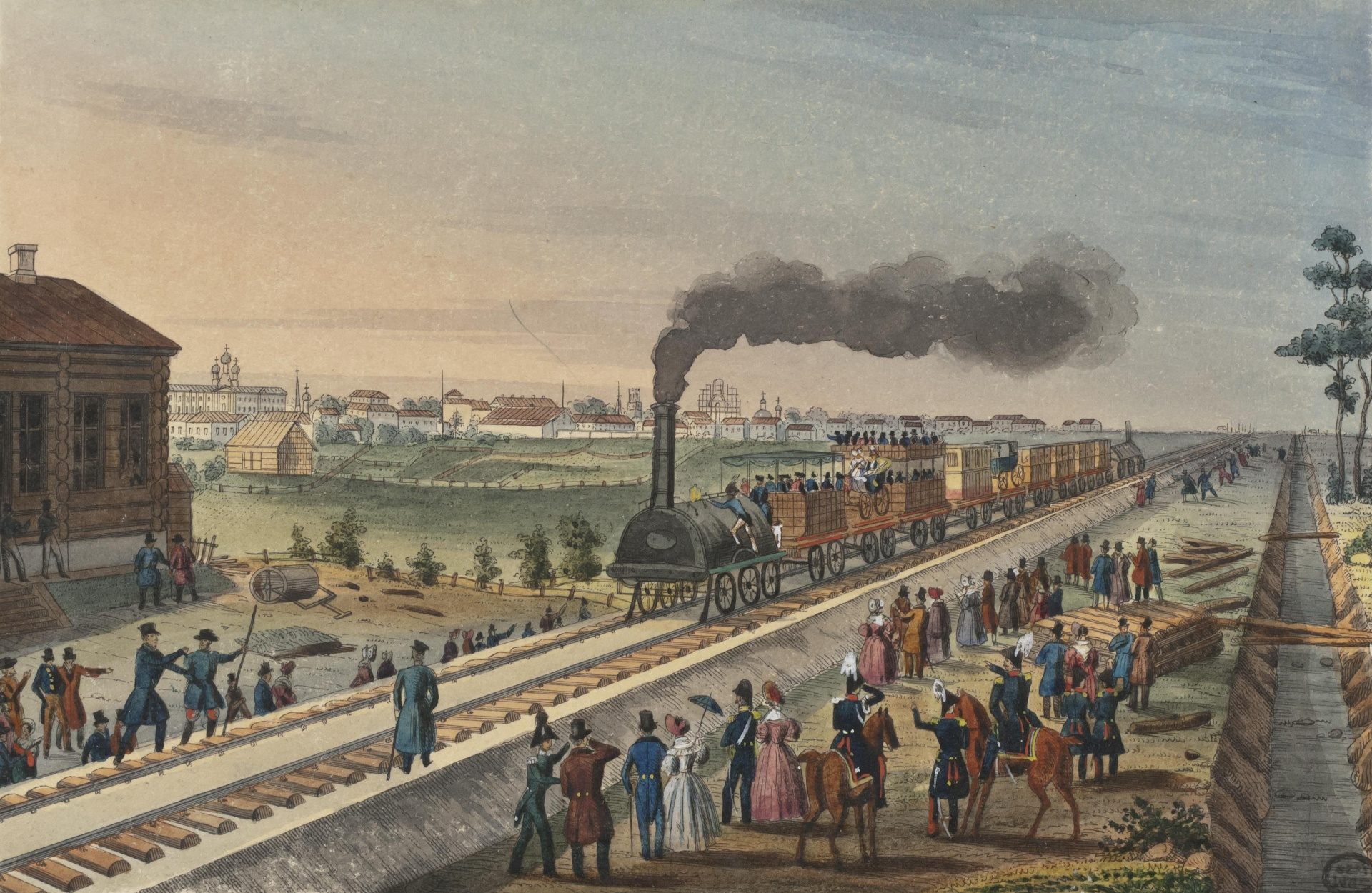
Watercolor-tinted lithograph, from the 1840s, depicting the arrival of the first Tsarskoye Selo Railway train at Tsarskoye Selo from St. Petersburg on 30 October 1837

After 1860, the expansion of Russian rail had far-reaching effects on the economy, culture, and ordinary life of Russia. The central authorities and the imperial elite made most of the key decisions, but local elites made demands for rail linkages. Local nobles, merchants, and entrepreneurs imagined a future of promoting their regional interests, from "locality" to "empire". Often, they had to compete with other cities. By envisioning their own role in a rail network they came to understand how important they were to the empire's economy.

During the 1880s, the Russian army built two major rail lines in Central Asia. The Transcaucasus Railway connected the city of Batum on the Black Sea and the oil center of Baku on the Caspian Sea. The Trans-Caspian Railway began at Krasnovodsk on the Caspian Sea and reached Bukhara, Samarkand, and Tashkent. Both lines served the commercial and strategic needs of the empire and facilitated migration.

== Religion ==
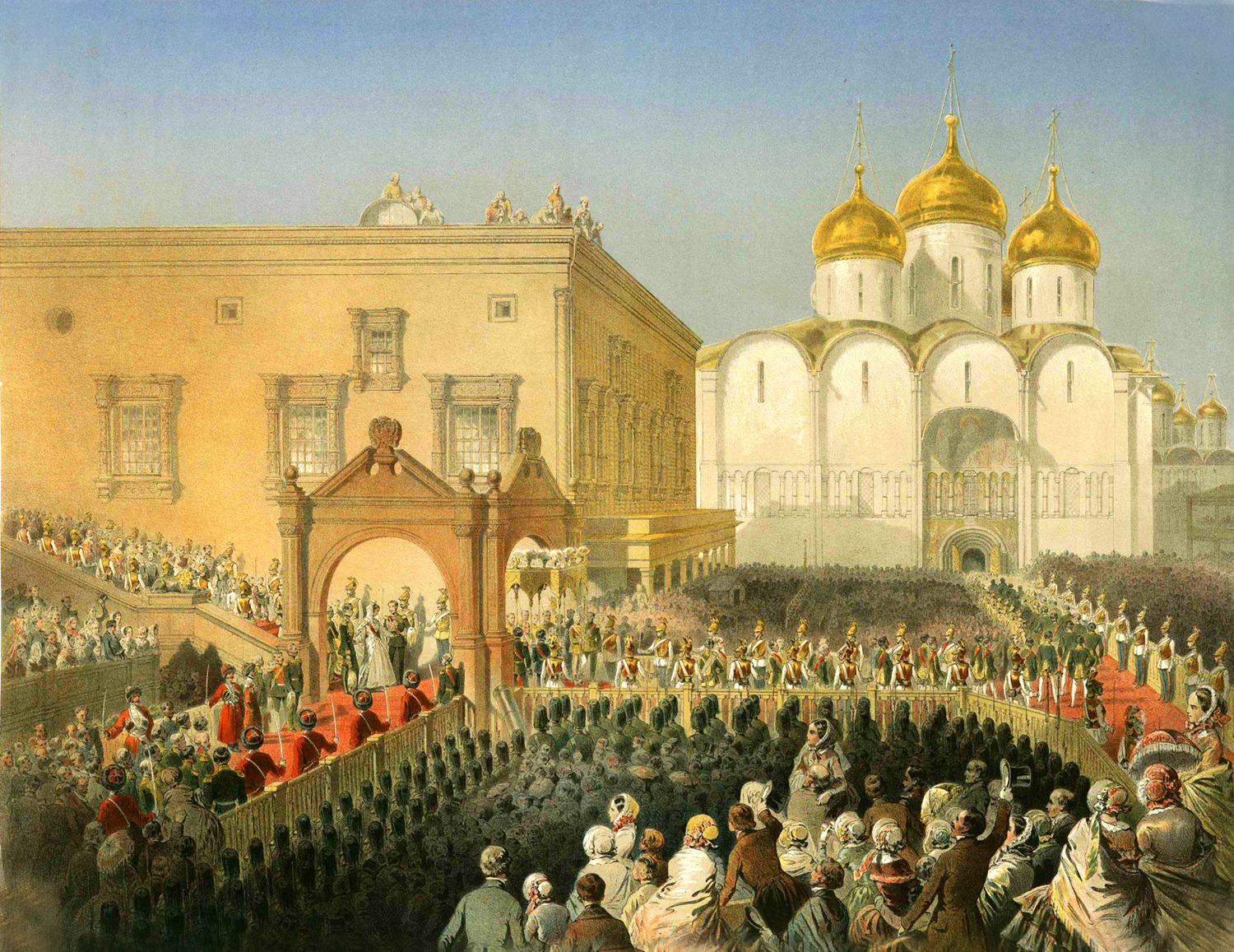
Contemporary painting of the procession of Emperor Alexander II into Dormition Cathedral in Moscow during his coronation in 1856

Map of subdivisions of the Russian Empire by largest ethnolinguistic group (1897)

The Russian Empire's state religion was Orthodox Christianity. The emperor was not allowed to "profess any faith other than the Orthodox" (Article 62 of the 1906 Fundamental Laws) and was deemed "the Supreme Defender and Guardian of the dogmas of the predominant Faith and is the Keeper of the purity of the Faith and all good order within the Holy Church" (Article 64 ex supra). Although he made and annulled all senior ecclesiastical appointments, he did not settle questions of dogma or church teaching. The principal ecclesiastical authority of the Russian Church—which extended its jurisdiction over the entire territory of the empire, including the ex-Kingdom of Kartli-Kakheti—was the Most Holy Synod, the civilian Over Procurator of the Holy Synod being one of the council of ministers with wide de facto powers in ecclesiastical matters.

The ecclesiastical heads of the national Russian Orthodox Church consisted of three metropolitans (Saint Petersburg, Moscow, Kiev), fourteen archbishops and fifty bishops, all drawn from the ranks of the monastic (celibate) clergy.

=== Religious policy ===
All non-Orthodox religions were formally forbidden from proselytizing within the empire. In a policy influenced by Catherine II but solidified in the 19th century, the Russian Empire exhibited increasing "confessionalization", pursuing top-down reorganization of the empire's faiths, also referred to as the "confessional state". The tsarist administration sought to arrange "orthodoxies" within Islam, Buddhism, and the Protestant faiths, which was performed by creating spiritual assemblies (in the case of Islam, Judaism, and Lutheranism), banning and declaring bishoprics (in the case of Roman Catholicism), and arbitrating doctrinal disputes. When the state lacked resources to provide a secular bureaucracy across its entire territory, guided 'reformation' of faiths provided elements of social control.

==== Antisemitism ====
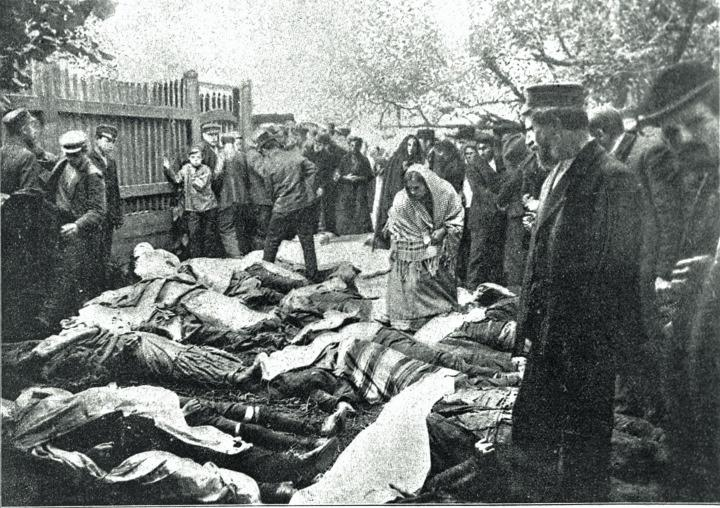
Corpses of Jewish victims collected for burial in the aftermath of the Białystok pogrom (1906)

After Catherine II annexed eastern Poland in the Polish Partitions, there were restrictions placed against Jews known as the Pale of Settlement, an area of the Russian Empire inside which Jews were authorized to settle, and outside of which were deprived of various rights such as freedom of movement or commerce. Particularly repressive was Emperor Nicholas I, who sought the forced assimilation of Jews, from 1827 conscripted Jewish children as Cantonists in military institutions in the east aiming to compel them to convert to Christianity, attempted to stratify Jews into "useful" and "not useful" based on wealth and further restricted religious and commercial rights within the Pale of Settlement. Emperor Alexander II ceased this harsh treatment and pursued a more bureaucratic type of assimilation, such as compensating the Cantonists for their previous military service, including those who remained Jewish, although certain military ranks were still limited to Christians. In contrast, Emperor Alexander III resumed an atmosphere of oppression, including the May Laws, which further restricted Jewish settlements and rights to own property, as well as limiting the types of professions available, and the expulsion of Jews from Kiev in 1886 and Moscow in 1891. The overall anti-Jewish policy of the Russian Empire led to significant sustained emigration.

==== Persecution of Muslims ====
Islam had a "sheltered but precarious" place in the Russian Empire. Initially, sporadic forced conversions and mosque demolitions were carried out against Muslims in the Volga-Ural region, particularly under the Office of Newly Baptized during the 1740s. In the 18th century, Catherine II issued an edict of toleration that gave legal status to Islam and allowed Muslims to fulfill religious obligations. Catherine also established the Orenburg Muslim Spiritual Assembly, which had a degree of imperial jurisdiction over the organization of Islamic practice in the country. As the Russian Empire expanded, tsarist administrators found it expedient to draw on existing Islamic religious institutions that were already in place.

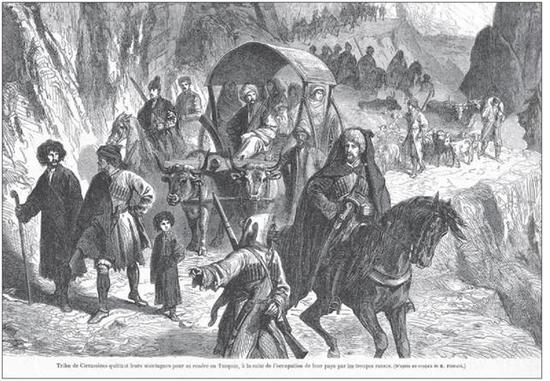
Depiction of Circassian refugees fleeing after the Russian conquest of Circassia during the 1860s. Summing up the imperial policy of Circassian genocide, Russian military historian Rostislav Fadeyev wrote: "The state needed the Circassians' land, but had absolutely no need of them."

In the 19th century, the restrictive policies became much more oppressive during the Russo-Turkish Wars, and the Russian Empire perpetrated persecutions such as the Circassian genocide during the 1860s. Following its conquest of Circassia, around 1 to 1.5 million Circassians – almost half of the total population – were killed or forcibly deported. Many of those who fled persecution also died en route to other countries. Today, the vast majority of Circassians live in diaspora communities. Throughout the late 19th century, the term "Circassian" became a common adage for "highwayman" across the Balkan and Anatolian regions, due to the prevalence of homeless Circassian refugees.

Many groups of Muslims such as Crimean Tatars were forced to emigrate to the Ottoman Empire following the Russian defeat in the Crimean War. During the latter portion of the 19th century, the status of Islam in the Russian Empire became associated with the tsarist regime's ideological principles of Official Nationality requiring Russian Orthodoxy. Nonetheless, in certain areas Islamic institutions were allowed to operate, such as the Orenburg Assembly, but were designated with a lower status.

==== Policy towards non-Eastern Orthodox Christian sects ====
Despite the predominance of Orthodoxy, several Christian denominations were professed. Lutherans were particularly tolerated with the invited settlement of Volga Germans and the presence of Baltic German nobility. During the reign of Catherine II, the Jesuit suppression was not promulgated, so Jesuits survived in the Russian Empire, and this "Russian Society" played a role in re-establishing the Jesuits in the west. Overall, Roman Catholicism was strictly controlled during Catherine II's reign, which was considered an epoch of relative tolerance for Catholicism. Catholics were distrusted by the Russian Empire as elements of Polish nationalism, a perception which especially increased following the January Uprising. After this Russification policies intensified and Orthodox churches such as Alexander Nevsky Cathedral, Warsaw were built across Congress Poland, but no forced conversion was attempted.

Tsarist religious policy was focused on punishing Orthodox dissenters, such as uniates and sectarians. Old Believers were seen as dangerous elements and persecuted heavily. Various minor sects such as Spiritual Christians and Molokan were banished in internal exile to Transcaucasia and Central Asia, with some further emigrating to the Americas. Doukhobors came to settle primarily in Canada.

In 1905, Emperor Nicholas II issued a religious toleration edict that gave legal status to non-Orthodox religions. This created a "Golden Age of Old Faith" for the previously persecuted Old Believers until the emergence of the Soviet Union. In the early 20th century, some of the restrictions of the Pale of Settlement were reversed, though were not formally abolished until the February Revolution. However, some historians evaluate Tsar Nicholas II as having given tacit approval to the antisemitic pogroms that resulted from reactionary riots. Edward Radzinsky suggested that many pogroms were incited by authorities and supported by the Tsarist Russian secret police, the Okhrana, even if some happened spontaneously. According to Radzinsky, Sergei Witte (appointed Prime Minister in 1905) remarked in his Memoirs that he found that some proclamations inciting pogroms were printed and distributed by imperial Police.

== Demography ==
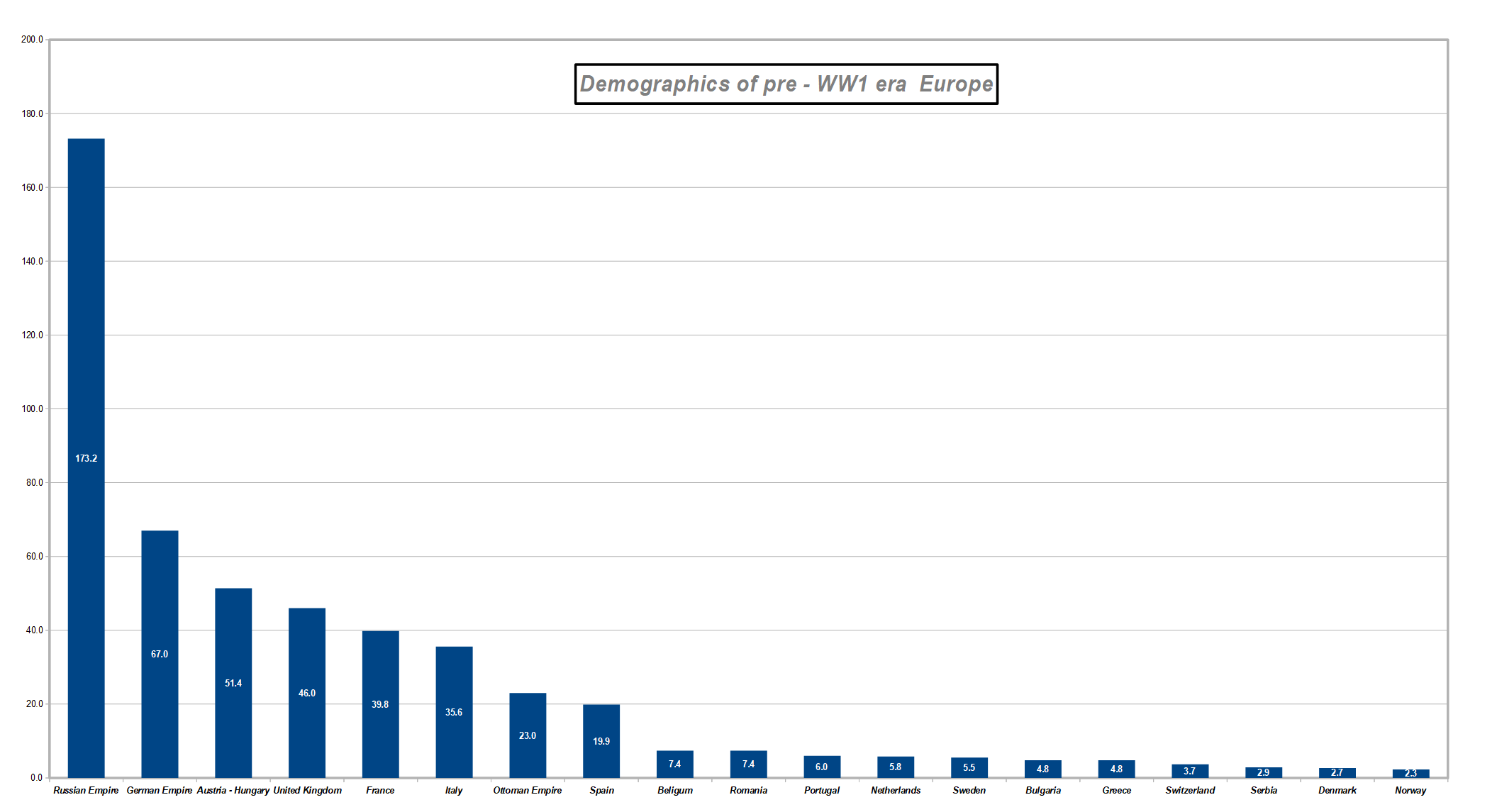
Demographics of pre-WW1 European countries

Ethnographic Map of the Russian Empire by Heinrich Berghaus 1852

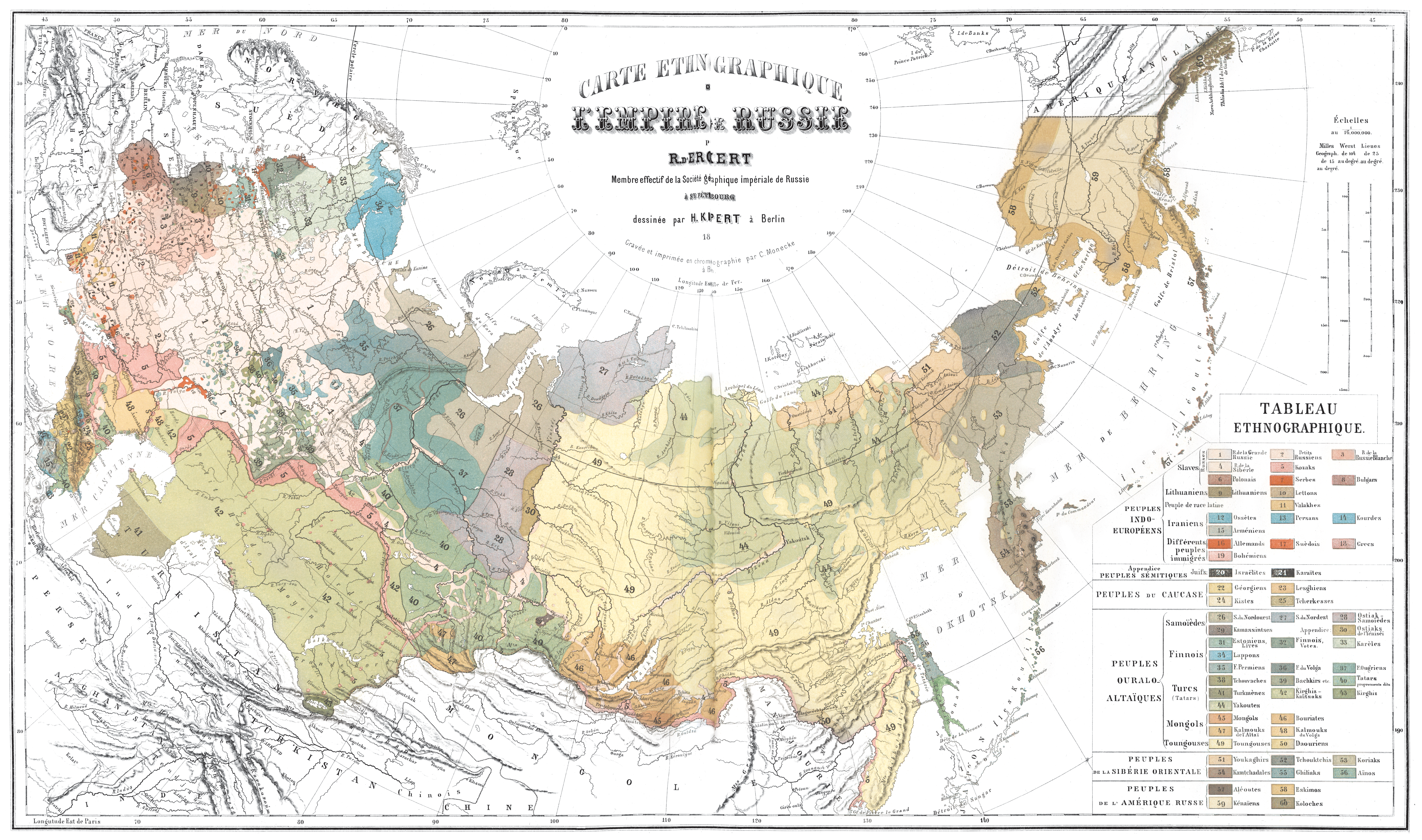
Ethnographic Map of the Russian Empire by Pauli Gustav-Fedor Khristianovich 1862

=== Imperial census of 1897 ===
According to returns published in 1905, based on the Russian Empire census of 1897, adherents of the different religious communities in the empire numbered approximately as follows.

Religion	Count of believers	%
Russian Orthodox	87,123,604	69.3%
Muslims	13,906,972	11.1%
Roman Catholics	11,467,994	9.1%
Rabbinic Jews	5,215,805	4.2%
Lutherans (Note: The Lutheran Church was the dominant faith of the Baltic Provinces, Ingria, and the Grand Duchy of Finland)	3,572,653	2.8%
Old Believers	2,204,596	1.8%
Armenian Apostolics	1,179,241	0.9%
Buddhists (Minor) and Lamaists (Minor)	433,863	0.4%
Other non-Christian religions	285,321	0.2%
Reformed	85,400	0.1%
Mennonites	66,564	0.1%
Armenian Catholics	38,840	0.0%
Baptists	38,139	0.0%
Karaite Jews	12,894	0.0%
Anglicans	4,183	0.0%
Other Christian denominations	3,952	0.0%

=== Russian Central Asia ===
Russian Central Asia was also called Turkestan. As of the 1897 census, Russian Central Asia's five oblasts contained 5,260,300 inhabitants, 13.9 percent of them urban. The largest towns were Tashkent (156,400), Kokand (82,100), Namangan (61,900), and Samarkand (54,900). By 1911, 17 percent of Semireche's population and half of its urban residents were Russians, four-fifths of them agricultural colonists. In the other four oblasts in the same year, Russians constituted only 4 percent of the population, and the overwhelming majority lived in European-style settlements alongside the native quarters in the major towns.

== Military ==
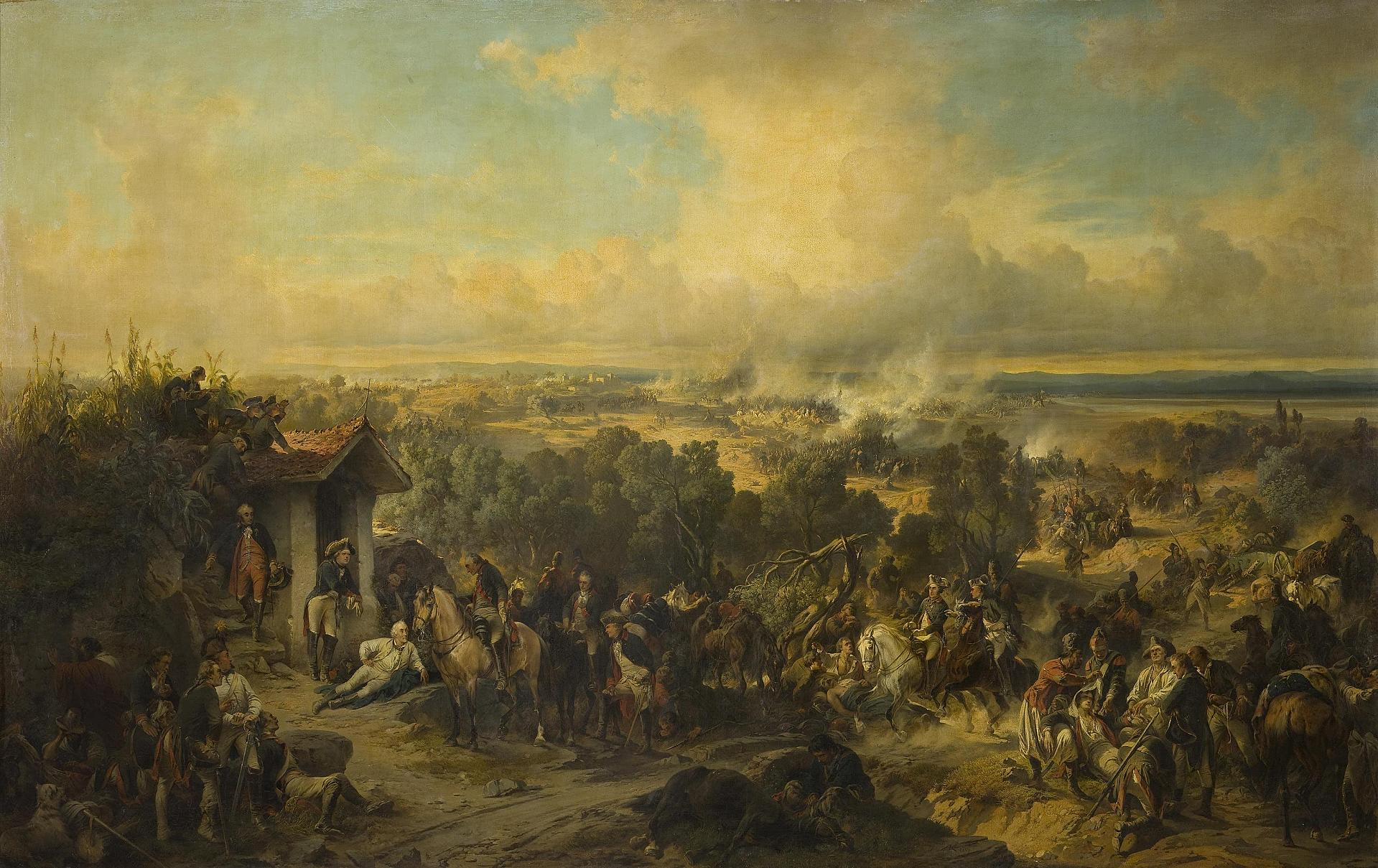
Battle of the Trebbia (1799) by Alexander von Kotzebue

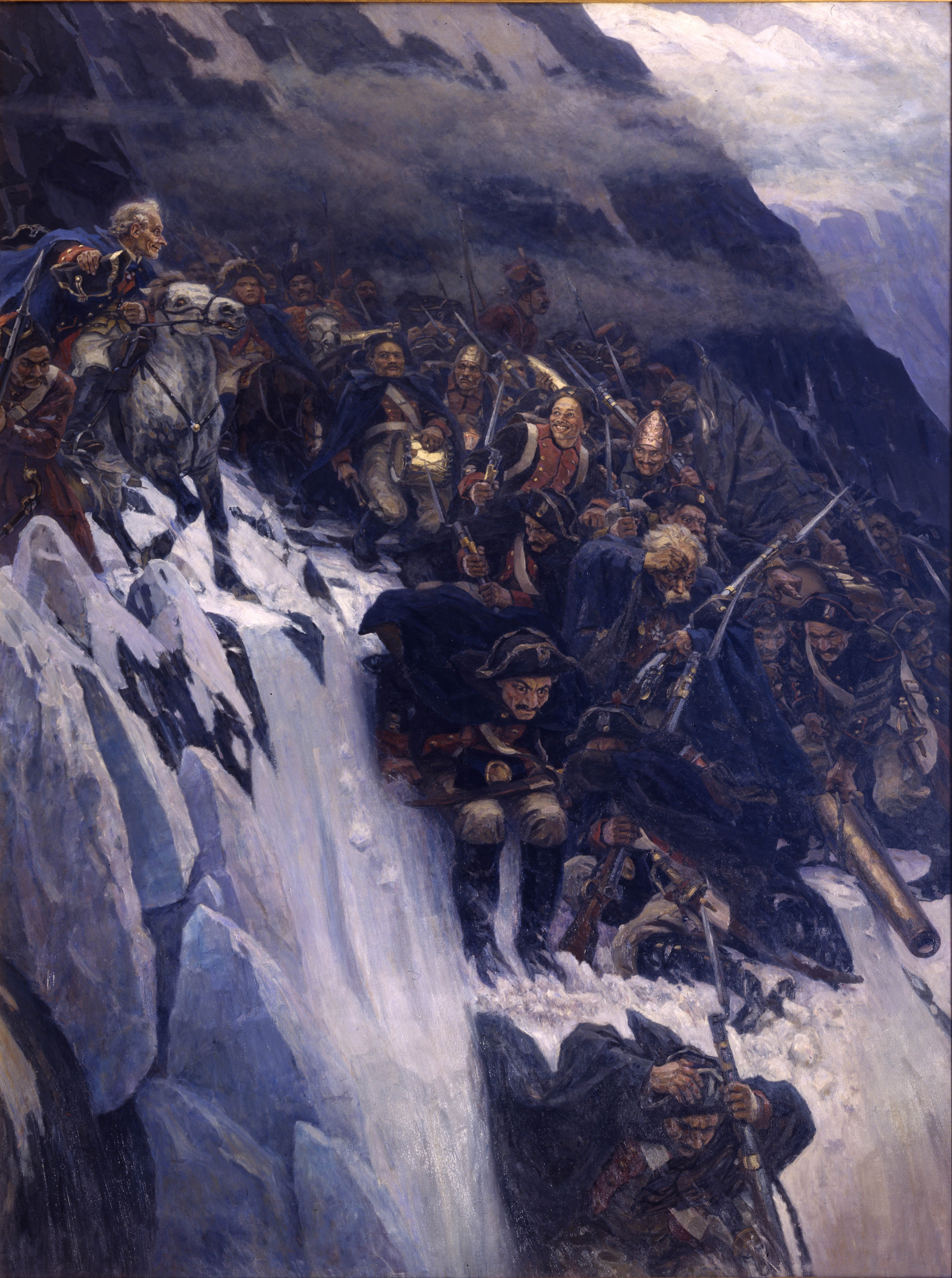
Suvorov crossing the Alps. By Vasily Surikov.

The armed forces of the Russian Empire consisted of the Imperial Russian Army and the Imperial Russian Navy. The Emperor of Russia was the commander-in-chief of the armed forces and implemented his military policies through the Ministry of War and the Ministry of the Navy, which were tasked with administering their respective branches. There was no joint staff, but joint commissions were formed to work on specific tasks that involved both services. The Main Staff of the War Ministry administered the Army's organization, training, and mobilization, as well as coordinating the different branches of the Army, while the General Staff was tasked with operational planning. This structure developed in the 1860s after the Crimean War. The Navy Ministry had a similar structure, including a Main Staff tasked with administration and a Naval Technological Committee, and after the Russo-Japanese War a Naval General Staff was added for operational planning and war preparation.

Peter the Great transformed Russia's mix of irregular, feudal, and modernized forces into a standing army and navy to meet the demands posed by the Great Northern War against Sweden and the conflicts with the Ottoman Empire. His reign also accelerated changes that had already started earlier. Peter issued a decree in 1699 that formed the basis for army recruitment, founded an artillery school in 1701 and an engineer school in 1709, put together military regulations for the organization of the army in 1716, created administrative organs to oversee the land and naval forces in 1718 (the College of War and the Admiralty), and oversaw the building of a new navy from scratch. These reforms were done with the help of foreign experts, though before the end of Peter's reign these experts were being increasingly replaced by Russian officers.

Most of the enlisted soldiers and sailors were peasant conscripts, though by the late 19th century the Imperial Navy preferred to draft members of the urban working class to fill its more technical roles. Both the army and navy had a shortage of non-commissioned officers, who were promoted from the enlisted ranks and tended to leave the military at the end of their mandatory service. Except for a few special units, almost no one voluntarily joined the military without the intention of becoming an officer. After the post-Crimean War reforms, there were three main commissioning sources of army officers: the Page Corps, the cadet corps, and the junker or military schools. The cadet corps, among which the Page Corps was considered the most elite, provided a military boarding school education to the sons of the high nobility as teenagers. The junker schools provided the largest number of officers, and had a two-year education program for older enlisted soldiers that served for at least one year, and these were most often either lesser nobility or commoners. The majority of army officers were nobles, though this changed by the end of the 19th century, with non-nobles being almost half of the officer corps in the 1890s. The source of naval officers was the Naval Cadet Corps. The majority of naval officers were also from the nobility, and many of them were descended from Baltic German or Swedish families with a history of naval service.

The Russian military budget declined in the late 19th century as the government prioritized spending for civilian purposes, paying interest on foreign loans, and building railways. Russia maintained a large peacetime standing army of over one million troops in the decades after the Napoleonic Wars, and at the outbreak of World War I it was the largest in Europe. During the war the Russian Army was unable to match the German Army in tactical and operational proficiency, but its performance against the Austro-Hungarian Army and the Ottoman Army was credible. The Russo-Japanese War took Russia from having the third largest navy in the world to the sixth largest. A reconstruction program was approved by the State Duma in 1912, but it was not completed before World War I. Russia's Baltic Fleet stayed on the defensive against the German High Seas Fleet, but its Black Sea Fleet had success in raiding Ottoman merchant shipping and threatened the ability of the Ottoman Empire to continue the war.

== Society ==
The Russian Empire was predominantly a rural society spread over vast spaces. In 1913, 80% of the people were peasants. Soviet historiography proclaimed that the Russian Empire of the 19th century was characterized by systemic crisis, which impoverished the workers and peasants and culminated in the revolutions of the early 20th century. Recent research by Russian scholars disputes this interpretation. Boris Mironov assesses the effects of the reforms of latter 19th-century, especially in terms of the 1861 emancipation of the serfs, agricultural output trends, various standard of living indicators, and taxation of peasants. He argues that those reforms brought about measurable improvements in social welfare. More generally, he finds that the well-being of the Russian people declined during most of the 18th century but increased slowly from the end of the 18th century to 1914.

=== Estates ===
Subjects of the Russian Empire were divided into sosloviyes, or social estates, principally the nobility (dvoryanstvo), clergy, merchants, burghers, cossacks, and peasants. Imperial governance relied heavily on co-opting traditional non-Russian elites—including Baltic German barons, Polish szlachta, Georgian nobility, and Muslim aristocrats—integrating them into the imperial nobility in exchange for administrative loyalty. Meanwhile, certain nomadic and non-Slavic indigenous populations of Siberia, Central Asia, and parts of the Caucasus were governed under a separate legal framework as inorodtsy (lit. 'people of another origin').

A majority of the population, 81.6%, belonged to the peasant order. The other classes were the nobility, 0.6%; clergy, 0.1%; the burghers and merchants, 9.3%; and military, 6.1%. More than 88 million Russians were peasants, some of whom were former serfs (10,447,149 males in 1858) – the remainder being "state peasants" (9,194,891 males in 1858, exclusive of the Archangel governorate) and "domain peasants" (842,740 males the same year).

Other distinct social groups included the intelligentsia, the non-gentry intellectuals known as raznochintsy, and student associations (zemlyachestvo).

=== Serfdom ===
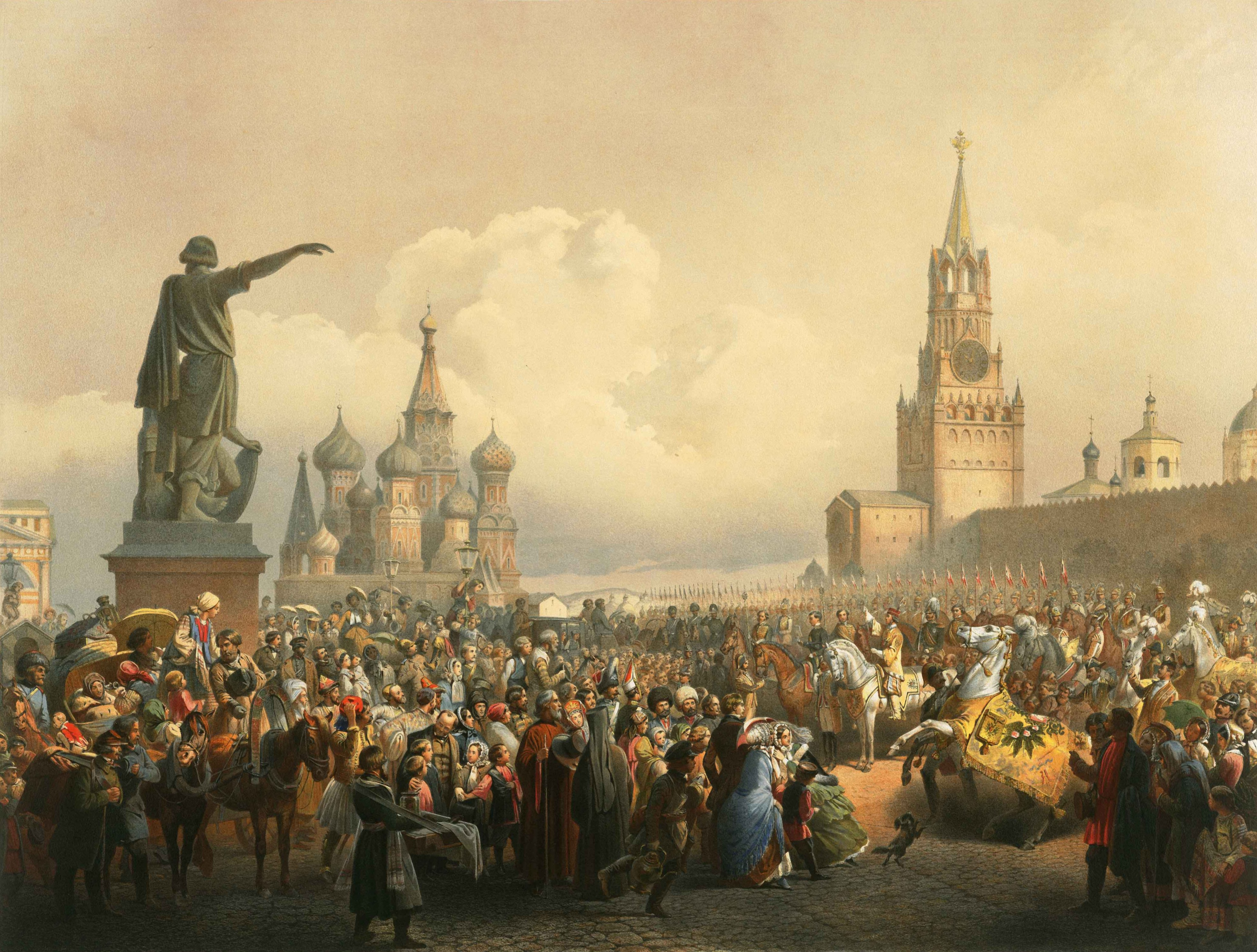
1856 painting imagining the announcement of the coronation of Alexander II that year

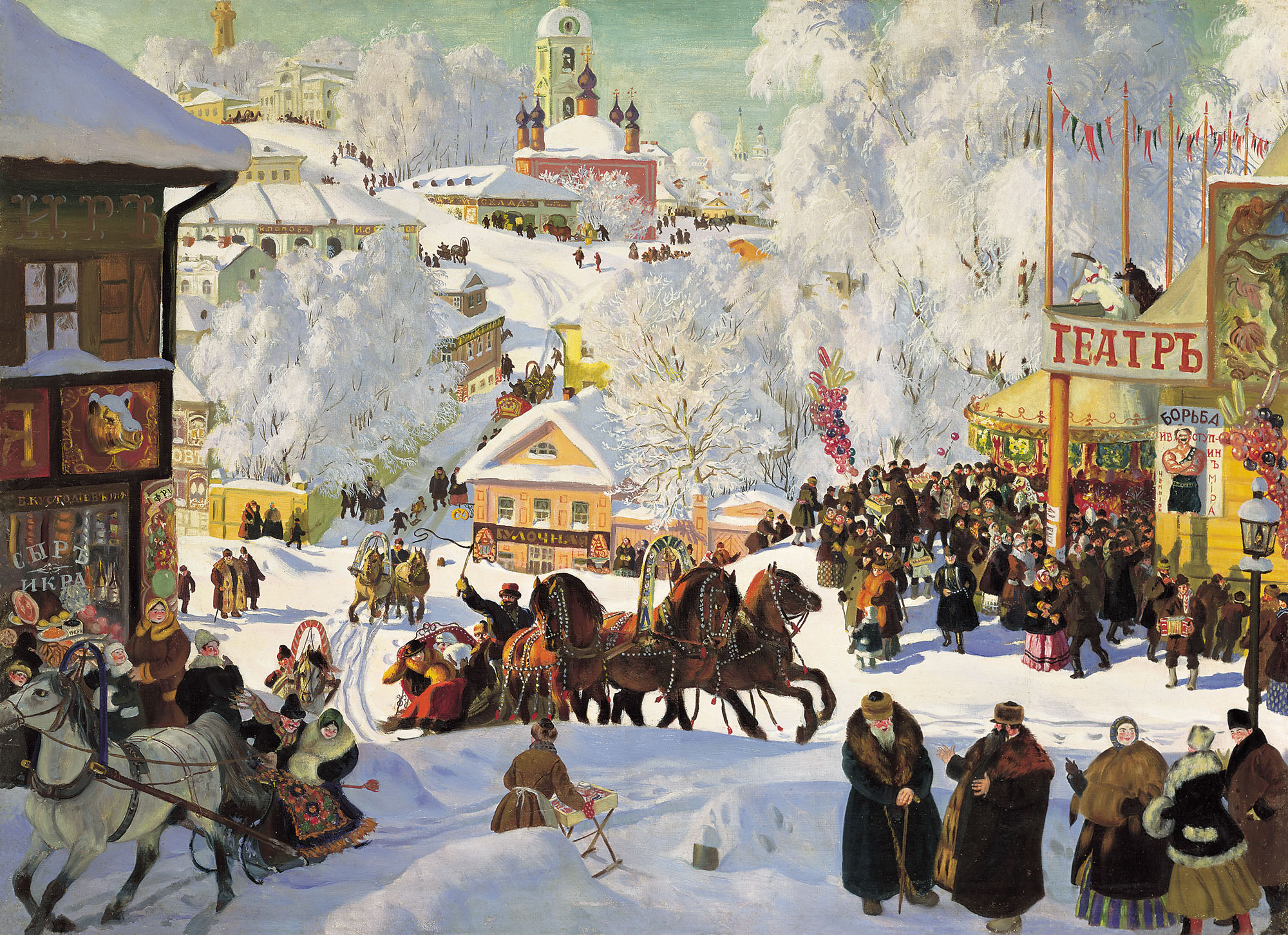
The 1916 painting Maslenitsa by Boris Kustodiev, depicting a Russian city in winter

The serfdom that had developed in Russia in the 16th century, and had become enshrined in law in 1649, was abolished in 1861.

Household servants or dependents attached to personal service were merely set free, while the landed peasants received their houses and orchards, and allotments of arable land. These allotments were given over to the rural commune, the mir, which was responsible for the payment of taxes for the allotments. For these allotments the peasants had to pay a fixed rent, which could be fulfilled by personal labor. The allotments could be redeemed by peasants with the help of the Crown, and then they were freed from all obligations to the landlord. The Crown paid the landlord and the peasants had to repay the Crown, for forty-nine years at 6% interest. The financial redemption to the landlord was not calculated on the value of the allotments but was considered as compensation for the loss of the compulsory serf labor. Many proprietors contrived to curtail the allotments that the peasants had occupied under serfdom, and frequently deprived them of precisely that land of which they were most in need: pasture lands around their houses. The result was to compel the peasants to rent land from their former masters.

Serfs lived in deplorable conditions, often working in the fields for up to six days a week and facing punishment such as being exiled to Siberia or conscripted into military service. Landowners had the right to sell serfs with or without their land. Children of serfs rarely received any formal education. These serfs were heavily taxed, making them the poorest of any Russians. In 1861, Emperor Alexander II saw serfs as a problem that held back Russia's development, so he liberated 23 million serfs to become free, but they remained indigent throughout the former enslaved population despite their rights. The zemstvo system, introduced in 1864, established elected rural assemblies charged with primary schooling, local healthcare, and road maintenance. Although the electoral system heavily favored the landed nobility, peasant representation allowed rural communities to direct a growing share of local revenue toward rural primary schools and agronomic assistance.

Exceptional peasant categories included free ploughman and state serfs.

=== Peasants ===
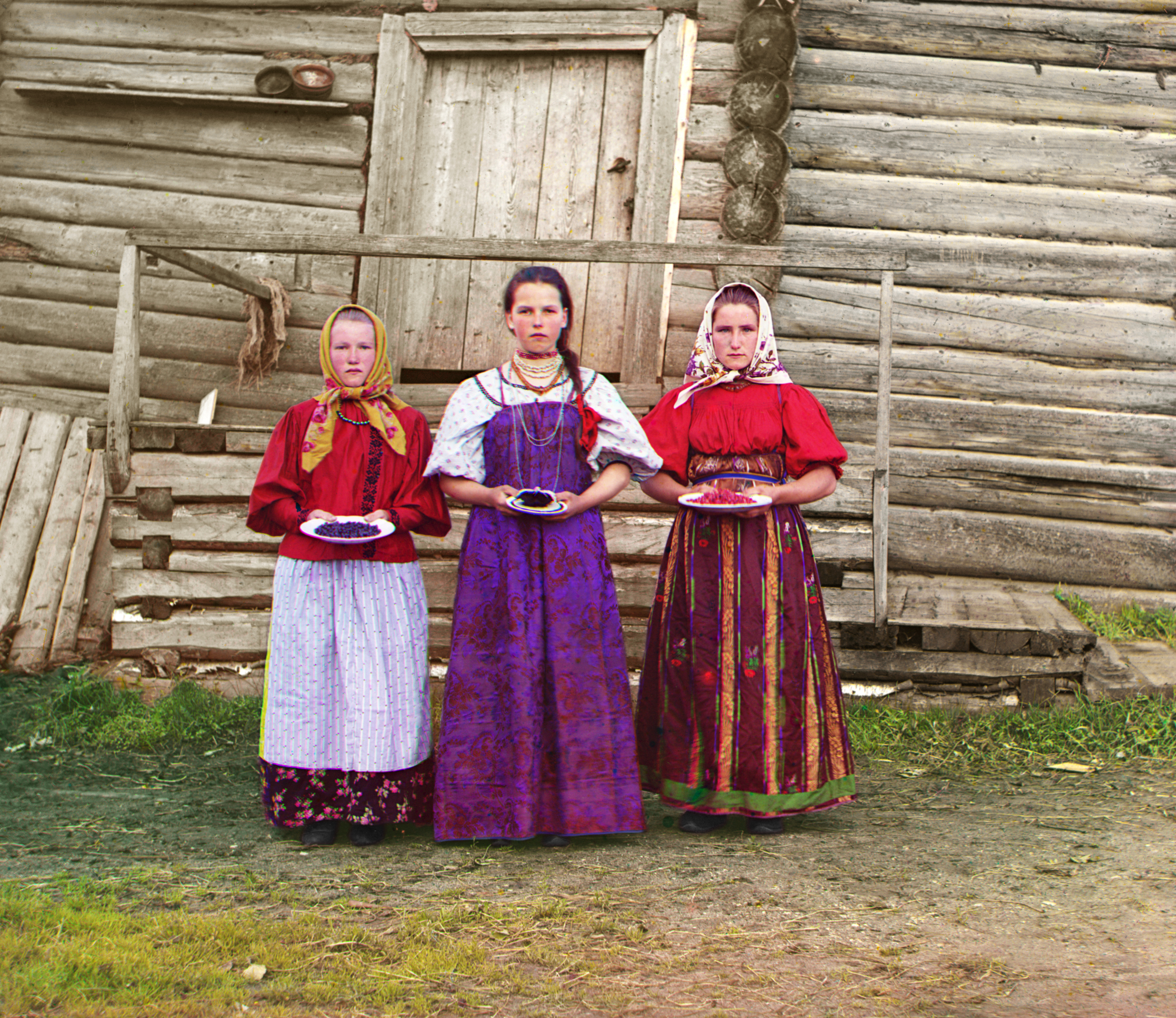
Young Russian peasant women in front of a traditional wooden house (c. 1909–1915), color photograph taken by Sergey Prokudin-Gorsky

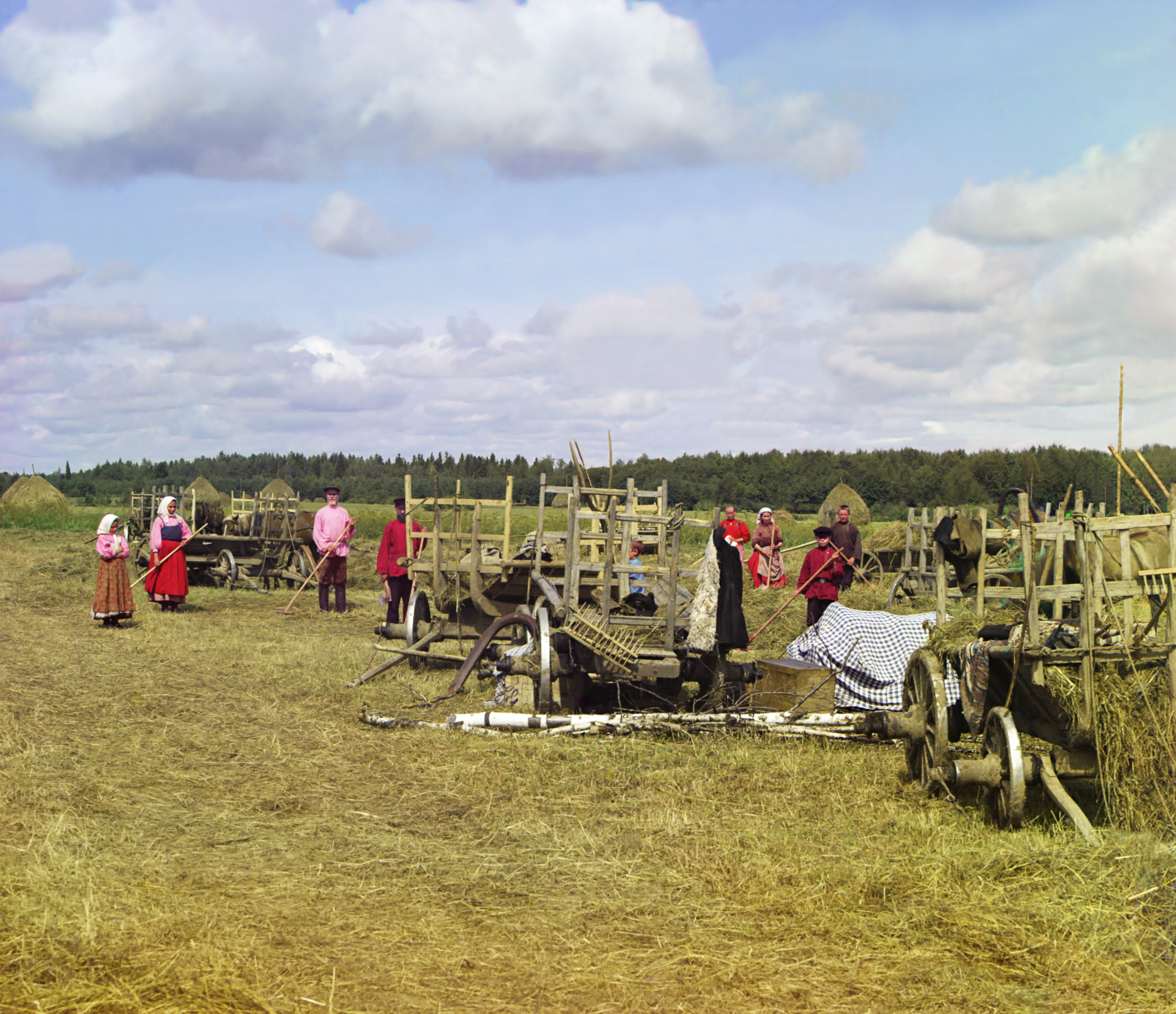
Peasants in Russia (color photograph taken by Prokudin-Gorsky in 1909)

The former serfs became peasants, joining the millions of farmers who already had peasant status. Most peasants lived in tens of thousands of small villages under a highly patriarchal system. Hundreds of thousands moved to cities to work in factories, but they typically retained their village connections.

After the emancipation reform, one-quarter of peasants received allotments of only 1.2 hectares (2.9 acres) per male, and one-half received less than 3.4 to 4.6 hectares (8.5 to 11.4 acres); the normal size of the allotment necessary for the subsistence of a family under the three-fields system is estimated at 11 to 17 hectares (28 to 42 acres). This land was of necessity rented from the landlords. The aggregate value of the redemption and land taxes often reached 185 to 275% of the normal rental value of the allotments, not to speak of taxes for recruiting purposes, the church, roads, local administration, and so on, chiefly levied on the peasants. This burden increased every year; consequently, one-fifth of the inhabitants left their houses and cattle disappeared. Every year more than half the adult males (in some districts three-quarters of the men and one-third of the women) quit their homes and wandered throughout Russia in search of work. In the governorates of the Black Earth Area the state of matters was hardly better. Many peasants took "gratuitous allotments", whose amount was about one-eighth of the normal allotments.

The average allotment in Kherson was only 0.36 hectares (0.90 acres), and for allotments from 1.2 to 2.3 hectares (2.9 to 5.8 acres) the peasants paid 5 to 10 rubles in redemption tax. The state peasants were better off; but they, too, were emigrating in masses. It was only in the steppe that the situation was more hopeful. In Ukraine, where the allotments were personal (the mir existing only among state peasants), the state of affairs was not better, on account of high redemption taxes. In the western provinces, where the land was more cheaply valued and the allotments somewhat increased after the Polish insurrection, the situation was better. Finally, in the Baltic provinces nearly all the land belonged to the German landlords, who either farmed the land themselves, with hired laborers, or let it in small farms. Only one-quarter of the peasants were farmers; the remainder were mere laborers.

=== Landowners ===
Accustomed to the use of compulsory labor, the former serf-proprietors failed to adapt to the new conditions. The millions of rubles of redemption money received from the crown was spent without any real or lasting agricultural improvements having been effected. The forests were sold, and the only prosperous landlords were those who exacted rack-rents for the land allotted to peasants. There was an increase of wealth among the few, but along with this a general impoverishment of the mass of the people. Added to this, the peculiar institution of the mir—framed on the principle of community ownership and occupation of the land—the overall effect was not encouraging of individual effort.

During the years 1861 to 1892 the land owned by the nobles decreased 30%, or ranging from 850,000 to 610,000 km^{2} (210,000,000 to 150,000,000 acres); during the following four years an additional 8,577 km^{2} (2,119,500 acres) were sold; and since then the sales went on at an accelerated rate, until in 1903 alone close to 8,000 km^{2} (2,000,000 acres) passed out of their hands. On the other hand, since 1861, and more especially since 1882, when the Peasant Land Bank was founded for making advances to peasants who were desirous of purchasing land, the former serfs, or rather their descendants, had between 1883 and 1904 bought about 78,900 km^{2} (19,500,000 acres) from their former masters.

In November 1906, however, Emperor Nicholas II promulgated a provisional order permitting the peasants to become freeholders of allotments made at the time of emancipation, all redemption dues being remitted. This measure, which was endorsed by the third Duma in an act passed on 21 December 1908, was calculated to have far-reaching and profound effects on the rural economy of Russia. Thirteen years previously the government had endeavored to secure greater fixity and permanence of tenure by providing that at least twelve years must elapse between every two redistributions of the land belonging to a mir amongst those entitled to share in it. The order of November 1906 provided that the various strips of land held by each peasant should be merged into a single holding; the Duma, however, on the advice of the government, left its implementation to the future, regarding it as an ideal that could only gradually be realized.

=== Media ===
Censorship was heavy-handed until the reign of Alexander II, but it never went away. Newspapers were strictly limited in what they could publish, and intellectuals favored literary magazines for their publishing outlets. Fyodor Dostoyevsky, for example, ridiculed the St. Petersburg newspapers, such as Golos and Peterburgskii Listok, accusing them of publishing trifles and distracting readers from the pressing social concerns of contemporary Russia through their obsession with spectacle and European popular culture.

=== Education ===
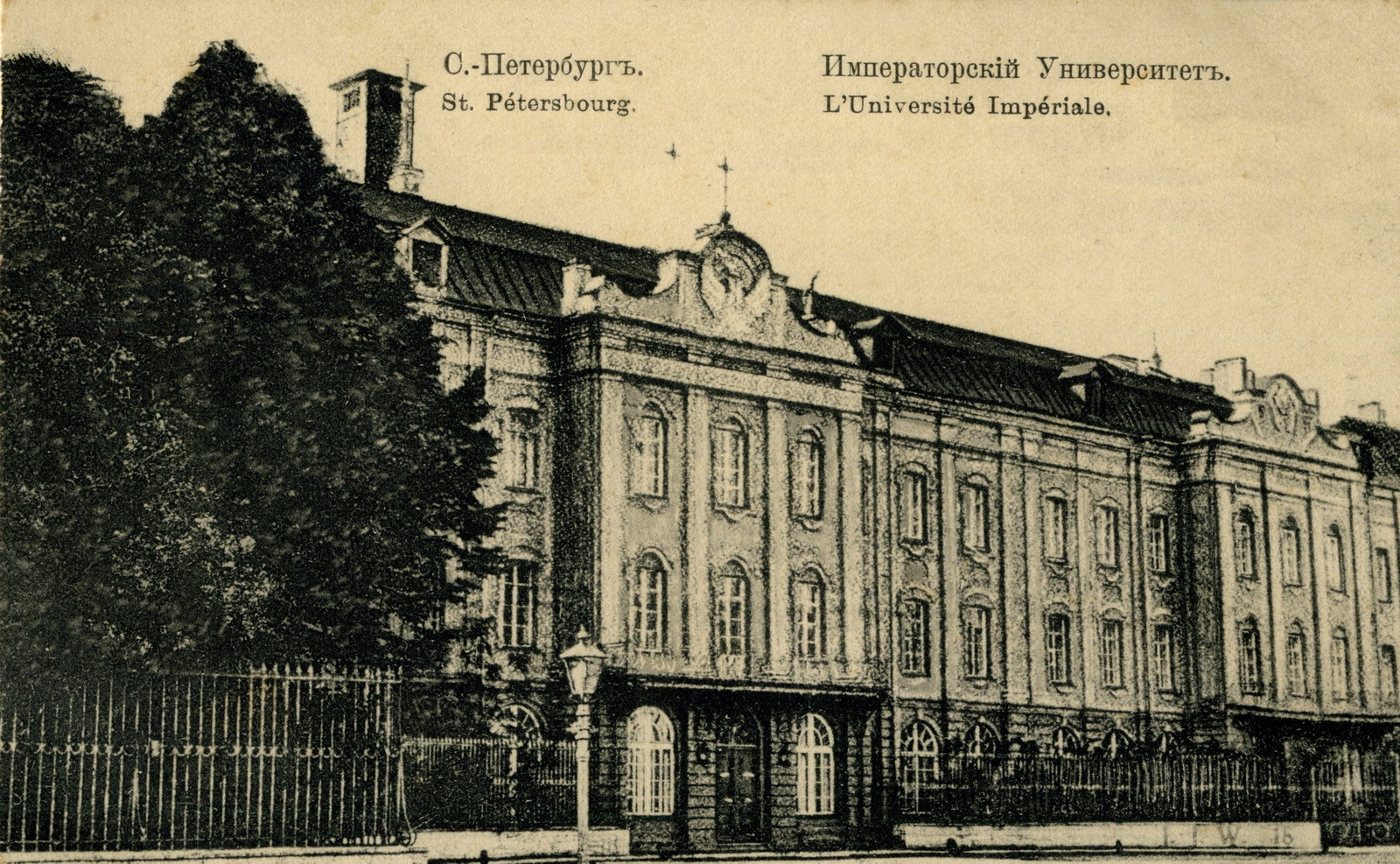
Saint Petersburg Imperial University

Educational standards were very low in the Russian Empire, though they slowly increased in its last century of existence. By 1800, the level of literacy among male peasants ranged from 1 to 12 percent and from 20 to 25 percent for urban men. Literacy among women was very low. Literacy rates were highest for the nobility (84 to 87 percent), followed by merchants (over 75 percent), and then the workers and peasants. Serfs were the least literate. In every group, women were far less literate than men. By contrast, in Western Europe, urban men had about a 50 percent literacy rate. The Orthodox hierarchy was suspicious of education, seeing no religious need for literacy whatsoever. Peasants did not need to be literate, and those who did — such as artisans, businessmen, and professionals — were few in number. As late as 1851, only 8% of Russians lived in cities.

The accession in 1801 of Alexander I (1801–1825) was widely welcomed as an opening to fresh liberal ideas from the European Enlightenment. Many reforms were promised, but few were implemented before 1820, when the emperor shifted his focus to foreign affairs and personal religious matters, neglecting issues of reform. In sharp contrast to Western Europe, the entire empire had a very small bureaucracy – about 17,000 public officials, most of whom lived in two of the largest cities, Moscow and Saint Petersburg. Modernization of government required much larger numbers; but that, in turn, required an educational system that could provide suitable training. Russia lacked that, and for university education, young men went to Western Europe. The army and the church had their own training programs, narrowly focused on their particular needs. The most important successful reform under Alexander I was the creation of a national system of education.

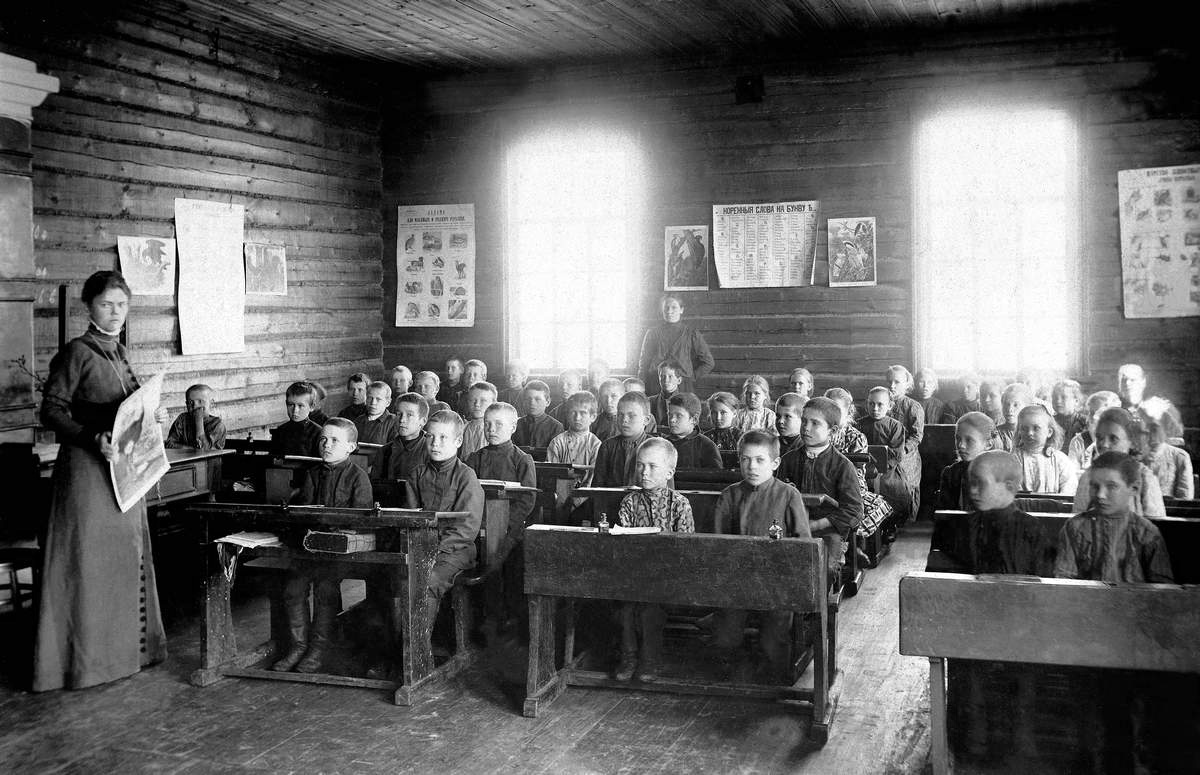
Russian primary school in the 1900s

The Ministry of Education was established in 1802, and the country was divided into six educational regions. The long-term plan was for a university in every region, a secondary school in every major city, upgraded primary schools, and – serving the largest number of students – a parish school for every two parishes. By 1825, the national government operated six universities, forty-eight secondary state schools, and 337 improved primary schools. Highly qualified teachers arrived from France, fleeing the revolution there. Exiled Jesuits set up elite boarding schools until their order was expelled in 1815. At the highest level, universities were based on the German model—in Kazan, Kharkov, St. Petersburg, Vilna (refounded as the Imperial University in 1803) and Dorpat—while the relatively young Imperial Moscow University was expanded. The higher forms of education were reserved for a very small elite, with only a few hundred students at the universities by 1825 and 5,500 in the secondary schools. There were no schools open to girls. Most rich families still depended on private tutors.

Emperor Nicholas I was a reactionary who wanted to neutralize foreign ideas, especially those he ridiculed as "pseudo-knowledge". Nevertheless, his Minister of Education, Sergey Uvarov, promoted greater academic freedom at the university level for faculty members, who were under suspicion by reactionary church officials. Uvarov raised academic standards, improved facilities, and opened the admission doors a bit wider. Nicholas tolerated Uvarov's achievements until 1848, after which he reversed these innovations. For the rest of the century, the national government continued to focus on universities, and generally ignored elementary and secondary educational needs. By 1900 there were 17,000 university students, and over 30,000 were enrolled in specialized technical institutes. The students were conspicuous in Moscow and Saint Petersburg as a political force typically at the forefront of demonstrations and disturbances. The majority of tertiary institutions in the empire used Russian, while some used other languages but later underwent Russification. Other educational institutions in the empire included the Nersisian School in Tiflis.

== See also ==
- Expansion of Russia (1500–1800)
- Russian imperialism

== Works cited ==
- Anderson, M. S. (1995) [1978]. Peter the Great. New York: Routledge. ISBN 978-0-582-43746-3.
- Ascher, Abraham (2004). The Revolution of 1905: A Short History. Stanford University Press. ISBN 978-0-8047-5028-8.
- Catchpole, Brian (1974). A Map History of Russia. Heinemann Educational Publishers.
- Chapman, Tim (2001). Imperial Russia, 1801–1905. Routledge. ISBN 978-0-415-23110-7.
- Coleman, Heather J. (3 September 2014). Orthodox Christianity in Imperial Russia: A Source Book on Lived Religion. Indiana University Press. ISBN 978-0-253-01318-7.
- Dowling, Timothy C. (2014). Russia at War: From the Mongol Conquest to Afghanistan, Chechnya, and Beyond [2 volumes]. ABC-CLIO. ISBN 978-1-5988-4948-6. Archived from the original on 12 January 2023.
- Dukes, Paul (1998). A History of Russia: Medieval, Modern, Contemporary, C. 882–1996. Duke University Press. ISBN 978-0-8223-2096-8.
- Feldbrugge, Ferdinand J. M. (2 October 2017). A History of Russian Law: From Ancient Times to the Council Code (Ulozhenie) of Tsar Aleksei Mikhailovich of 1649. BRILL. p. 306. ISBN 978-90-04-35214-8.
- Freeze, Gregory L. (2002). Russia: A History (2nd ed.). Oxford: Oxford University Press. p. 556. ISBN 978-0-1986-0511-9. Archived from the original on 26 March 2023.
- General Staff, War Office (1914). Handbook of the Russian Army. London: Imperial War Museum.
- Hosking, Geoffrey (2011). Russia and the Russians: A History (2nd ed.). Harvard University Press. ISBN 978-0-6740-6195-8. Archived from the original on 20 January 2023.
- Moss, Walter G. (2003). A History of Russia Volume 1: To 1917. Anthem Press. ISBN 978-0-8572-8752-6.
- Halpern, Paul G. (1994). A Naval History of World War I. Annapolis: Naval Institute Press. ISBN 978-1-61251-172-6.
- Hughes, Lindsey (1998). Russia in the Age of Peter the Great. New Haven, CT: Yale University Press. p. 640. ISBN 978-0-3000-8266-1. OL 358704M.
- Lieven, Dominic C. B., ed. (2006). The Cambridge History of Russia. Vol. II, Imperial Russia, 1689–1917. Cambridge University Press.
- Lieven, Dominic C. B. (2015). The End of Tsarist Russia: The March to World War I and Revolution. Penguin. ISBN 978-0-1431-0955-6. Archived from the original on 27 February 2024.
- Lieven, Dominic (2021). "The Russian Empire (1453–1917)". In Bang, Peter Fibiger; Bayly, Christopher Alan; Scheidel, Walter (eds.). The Oxford World History of Empire. Oxford University Press. pp. 964–988. ISBN 978-0-19-753276-8.
- Mayzel, Matitiahu (1975). "The Formation of the Russian General Staff, 1880–1917: A Social Study". Cahiers du Monde Russe et Soviétique. 16 (3/4): 297–321. doi:10.3406/cmr.1975.1241. JSTOR 20169731.
- McMeekin, Sean (2011). The Russian Origins of the First World War. Harvard University Press. ISBN 978-0-6740-6210-8. Archived from the original on 7 January 2023.
- Middleton, John (1 June 2015). "Russian dynasties". World Monarchies and Dynasties. Routledge. pp. 805–810. ISBN 978-1-317-45157-0.
- Papastratigakis, Nicholas (2011). Russian Imperialism and Naval Power: Military Strategy and the Build-Up to the Russo-Japanese War. London: Bloomsbury Publishing. ISBN 978-1-8488-5691-2.
- Pipes, Richard (1974). Russia under the Old Regime. New York: Scribner. ISBN 978-0-6841-4041-4.
- Pipes, Richard (2011). A Concise History of the Russian Revolution. Knopf Doubleday Publishing Group. ISBN 978-0-3077-8858-0. Archived from the original on 12 January 2023.
- Raeff, Marc (1984). Understanding Imperial Russia: State and Society in the Old Regime. Columbia University Press. ISBN 978-0-231-05843-8.
- Reese, Roger R. (2019). The Imperial Russian Army in Peace, War, and Revolution, 1856–1917. Lawrence: University Press of Kansas. ISBN 978-0-7006-2860-5.
- Sanborn, Joshua A. (2014). Imperial Apocalypse: The Great War and the Destruction of the Russian Empire. Oxford University Press. ISBN 978-0-1996-4205-2. Archived from the original on 10 January 2023.
- Seton-Watson, Hugh (1967). The Russian Empire 1801–1917. The Oxford History of Modern Europe. Clarendon Press. ISBN 0-1982-2103-7. OL 18540198M.
- Stavrou, Theofanis G. (1969). Russia Under the Last Tsar. University of Minnesota Press. ISBN 978-0-8166-0514-9.
- Stein, Howard F. (December 1976). "Russian Nationalism and the Divided Soul of the Westernizers and Slavophiles". Ethos. 4 (4): 403–438. doi:10.1525/eth.1976.4.4.02a00010.
- Thompson, John M. (2004). "Duma". In Millar, James R. (ed.). Encyclopedia of Russian History. Macmillan Reference USA. pp. 415–416. ISBN 978-0-02-865694-6.
- Tucker, Spencer C., ed. (2014). World War I: The Definitive Encyclopedia and Document Collection [5 volumes]: The Definitive Encyclopedia and Document Collection. ABC-CLIO. ISBN 978-1-8510-9965-8. Archived from the original on 26 December 2022.
- Tucker, Spencer C., ed. (2019). World War I: A Country-by-Country Guide. ABC-CLIO. ISBN 978-1-4408-6369-1. Archived from the original on 26 December 2022.
- Stone, David R. (2021). The Russian Army in the Great War: The Eastern Front, 1914–1917. Lawrence: University Press of Kansas. p. 33. ISBN 978-0-7006-3308-1.
- Vinogradov, Sergei E. (1998). "Battleship Development in Russia from 1905 to 1917". Warship International. 35 (3): 267–90. JSTOR 44892563.
- Waldron, Peter (1997). The End of Imperial Russia, 1855–1917. European History in Perspective. Palgrave Macmillan. doi:10.1007/978-1-349-25483-5. ISBN 978-0-333-60168-6.
- Westwood, J. N. (1994). Russian Naval Construction, 1905–45. London: Palgrave Macmillan. ISBN 978-1-349-12458-9.
- Williams, Beryl (December 1994). "The concept of the first Duma: Russia 1905–1906". Parliaments, Estates and Representation. 14 (2): 149–158. doi:10.1080/02606755.1994.9525857.
