= Bessonovsky =

Bessonovsky (masculine), Bessonovskaya (feminine), or Bessonovskoye (neuter) may refer to:

- Bessonovsky District, a district of Penza Oblast, Russia
- Bessonovsky (rural locality) (Bessonovskoye, Bessonovskaya), name of several rural localities in Russia
