= Council of Defence =

Soviet military advisory body

Council of Defence of the Soviet Union
- Совет обороны СССР
- All ministry seals of the Soviet Union used the USSR coat of arms

Agency overview
- Preceding agencies: State Defense Committee; Council of People's Commissars of the Soviet Union
- Jurisdiction: USSR
- Headquarters: Moscow, Russia
- Agency executive: CPSU General Secretary

The Defence Council or the Council of Defense of the USSR (Russian: Совет обороны) was a high military advisory body which aided and assisted the Government of the Soviet Union and the Central Committee of the Communist Party of the Soviet Union in the implementation of military policy by the Soviet Armed Forces. It operated between 1955 and 1991. At the end of its existence, it was known as the Defense Council under the President of the Soviet Union.

== History ==
Following the October Revolution and the establishment of the Soviet Union, a consecutive number of organizations were created with the purpose of coordinating topics related to national economy, military and arms industry. The first organization was the Council of Workers' and Peasants' Defense, later replaced by the Council of Labor and Defense. At the end of April 1937, its functions were transferred to a State Committee, the Defense Committee of the Soviet Union which was formed on the basis of the Defense Commission of the Council of People's Commissars of the Soviet Union. On June 30, 1941, following the outbreak Great Patriotic War, the issues of defense of the Soviet state were transferred to the newly created State Defense Committee, which was a more powerful body and included the Operational Bureau, which was responsible for monitoring the current work of the people's commissariats of the defense industries, both in industry and in those supporting their activities. In parallel, the Bureau of the Council of People's Commissars of the Soviet Union operated in the government, which had operational control over all other sectors of the national economy.

After the end of World War II, the state apparatus of the USSR began to switch to work in peacetime conditions. By the decision of the Presidium of the Supreme Soviet of the USSR of September 4, 1945, the State Defense Committee of the USSR was abolished, and all its functions were transferred to the Council of People's Commissars of the USSR. On September 6, instead of the Bureau of the Council of People's Commissars of the USSR and the Operational Bureau of the State Defense Committee, two Operational Bureaus of the Council of People's Commissars of the USSR were created. One of them dealt with issues related to the work of the People's Commissariats of Defense and the Navy, agriculture, trade and finance, as well as committees and departments under the Council of People's Commissars of the USSR, the other - concerning the work of industrial people's commissariats and railway transport. They were responsible for preparing and submitting for consideration by the Chairman of the Council of People's Commissars of the USSR draft decisions on the national economic plan, as well as on individual important issues requiring a government decision

In May 1948, a report was received by Joseph Stalin from Maksim Saburov, Deputy Chairman of the Council of Ministers of the USSR, and Dmitry Ustinov, Minister of Armaments which said the following:

Before the Great Patriotic War, in the system of Government bodies of the USSR, there was a Defense Committee under the Council of People's Commissars of the USSR, which coordinated and resolved issues related to the defense of the country and the work of the military industry. During the Great Patriotic War, these issues were resolved by the State Defense Committee. Currently, there is no such special body. The sectoral Bureaus created under the Council of Ministers of the USSR do not consider these issues. Meanwhile, there is an urgent need to create a body capable of examining mobilization plans and their provision, current issues of the military industry, the creation of new types of weapons, coordination and coordination in the work of individual branches of the military industry, etc. In the practice of current work, we acutely feel the need to create such a body

— D. Sakhnov, The USSR Defense Council and its role in the creation of the Strategic Missile Forces

On 20 December 1954, a secret resolution P106/III of the Presidium of the Central Committee of the CPSU "On the Creation of the Supreme Council of Defense of the USSR" was issued. On 7 February 1955, a secret resolution of the Presidium of the Central Committee of the CPSU approved the resolution of the Central Committee and the Council of Ministers.

The first composition included the following:

- Nikita Khrushchev
- Nikolai Bulganin
- Klement Voroshilov
- Lazar Kaganovich
- Vyacheslav Molotov
- Georgy Zhukov
- Aleksandr Vasilevsky

The Military Council was created as a deliberative body under the Defense Council. The position of the Defense Council in the system of public authorities was enshrined in Article 121 of the 1977 Constitution of the USSR, according to which the Supreme Soviet approved its composition. Obligatory participation of the members of the Presidium of the CPSU Central Committee was a given, with the heads of government bodies and state organizations also being invited to its meetings. As a rule, it held its meetings at regular intervals as well as during emergency situations such as during the Cuban Missile Crisis in 1962.

After the establishment in 1990 of the office of President of the Soviet Union, the council became an exclusive advisory body to the head of state. This was abolished by decree of President Gorbachev on 25 December 1991. Only to be succeeded by the republican security councils in the former Soviet republics as well as the Security Council of the RSFSR over the next 2 years.

== Leadership ==
On 7 February 1955, by decree of the Presidium of the CPSU Central Committee "On the Creation of the Defense Council of the USSR" approved the draft resolution of the CPSU Central Committee, the Presidium of the Supreme Soviet of the USSR, and the Council of Ministers of the USSR on the creation of the Defense Council.

=== Chairmen ===
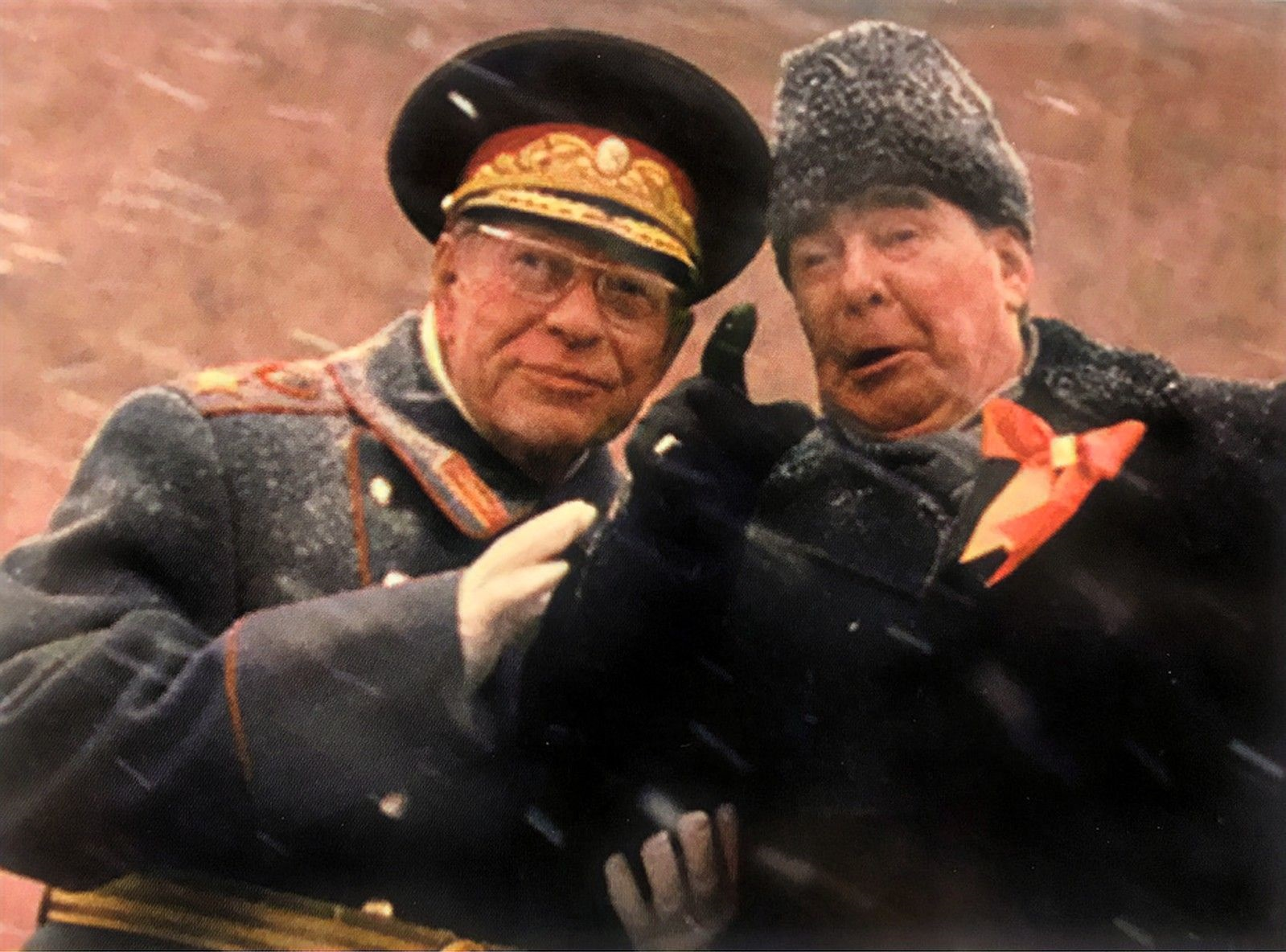
CPSU General Secretary Leonid Brezhnev and Marshal Dmitry Ustinov at the 1979 October Revolution Day Parade on Red Square. In his position as head of state, he was also the head of the Defence Council.

The office of chairman was concurrently held by the General Secretary of the Communist Party of the Soviet Union:

- Nikita Khrushchev (7 February 1955 – 14 October 1964)
- Leonid Brezhnev (14 October 1964 – 10 November 1982)
- Yuri Andropov (12 November 1982 – 9 February 1984)
- Konstantin Chernenko (13 February 1984 – 10 March 1985)
- Mikhail Gorbachev (11 March 1985 – 25 December 1991)

In 1955–1990, the Chairman of the Defense Council exercised his authority as the de facto "Supreme Commander–in–Chief of the Soviet Armed Forces".

=== Secretaries ===
The Secretaries of the Defense Council were concurrently Deputy Chiefs of the General Staff of the Armed Forces:

- Colonel General Nikolai Pavlovsky (1955–1959)
- Army General Semyon Ivanov (1959–1962)
- Colonel General Mikhail Povaly (1962–1969)
- Army General Mikhail Kozlov (1969–1974)
- Marshal of the Soviet Union Sergey Akhromeyev (1974–1986)
- Colonel General Sergei Dikov (1986–1989)
- Lieutenant General Anatoly Chuvakin (1989–1991)

== See also ==
- Security Council of Russia
- Security Council of the Soviet Union
- Minister of Defence (Soviet Union)
- Council of Labor and Defense
- State Defense Committee
- Military Council of the Russian Empire
- National Security Commission of the Chinese Communist Party
- National Defense Council of East Germany
- Revolutionary Military Council
