= Bessonovka =

Bessonovka (Russian: Бессоновка) is the name of several rural localities in Russia:

- Bessonovka, Belgorod Oblast, a selo in Belgorodsky District of Belgorod Oblast
- Bessonovka, Bessonovsky District, Penza Oblast, a selo in Bessonovsky Selsoviet of Bessonovsky District of Penza Oblast
- Bessonovka, Kamensky District, Penza Oblast, a village in Vladykinsky Selsoviet of Kamensky District of Penza Oblast
- Bessonovka, Ryazan Oblast, a village in Kutukovsky Rural Okrug of Spassky District of Ryazan Oblast
- Bessonovka, Novoburassky District, Saratov Oblast, a village in Novoburassky District, Saratov Oblast
- Bessonovka, Novouzensky District, Saratov Oblast, a selo in Novouzensky District, Saratov Oblast
- Bessonovka, Tambov Oblast, a village in Gavrilovsky 1-y Selsoviet of Gavrilovsky District of Tambov Oblast
