= BaltGaz Group =

Russian heating gas equipment company

BaltGaz Group BaltGaz Групп
- Type: Private (OОO)
- Founded: 1995
- Headquarters: St. Petersburg, Russia
- Key people: Mulkadar Valiev (Chairman)
- Services: Heating gas equipment
- Number of employees: 1200
- Website: www.baltgaz.com

BaltGaz Group (known before 2013 as Baltic Gas Company) is one of the biggest manufacturers and suppliers of heating gas equipment in Russia. The head office is situated in Saint Petersburg. BaltGazGroup branch offices are spread all over Russia, namely in such big cities as Moscow, Krasnodar, Yekaterinburg, Kazan, Samara, Lipetsk, Nizhny Novgorod, Volgograd.

== History ==
The BaltGaz Group’s history begins in 1945, when The USSR State Defence Committee made a decision to create a plant producing household gas appliances in Saint-Petersburg, The Leningrad Experimental Plant of Gas Equipment. In 1993 The Leningrad Experimental Plant of Gas Equipment changed its name for “Gazapparat” Jsc. In 1995 “Baltic Gas Company” was founded and together with “Gazapparat” Jsc it starts developing the water heaters production. One of the most well-known products of the company in those days was the instantaneous gas water heater of the trade mark “NEVA”.

== Structure ==
In 2013, besides the head office in Saint-Petersburg and eight branch offices in the biggest cities of Russia which have the common name "Gazkomplektservis", the company has 3 own safe custody warehouses and a network of authorized service centers (more than 380). The retail stores network «Lengazapparat» has been selling the full range of HVAC goods and related items in Saint-Petersburg since 1993. Also the Group has an Engineering and Technical Center where research and development of modern gas equipment is effectuated, in accordance with the international standards in the field of energy saving and ecological compatibility.

Industrial facilities of BaltGaz Group consist of two modern plants: Gazapparat in Saint-Petersburg and Armavirsky Gas Equipment Plant in Southern Russia. In July 2013 a branch office in Ukraine is opening.

Also there is a modern gas engineering laboratory for testing gas appliances on the territory of Gazapparat plant that was upgraded in 2012.

BaltGaz Group also took part in several international exhibitions, for example in the world-famous international Exhibition in China - Canton Fair, where BaltGaz was the only Russian manufacturer. BaltGaz Group exhibited wall-hung gas water heaters and gas boilers of its own brand BaltGaz NEVA. This year BaltGaz Group is entering international markets.

== Activities ==
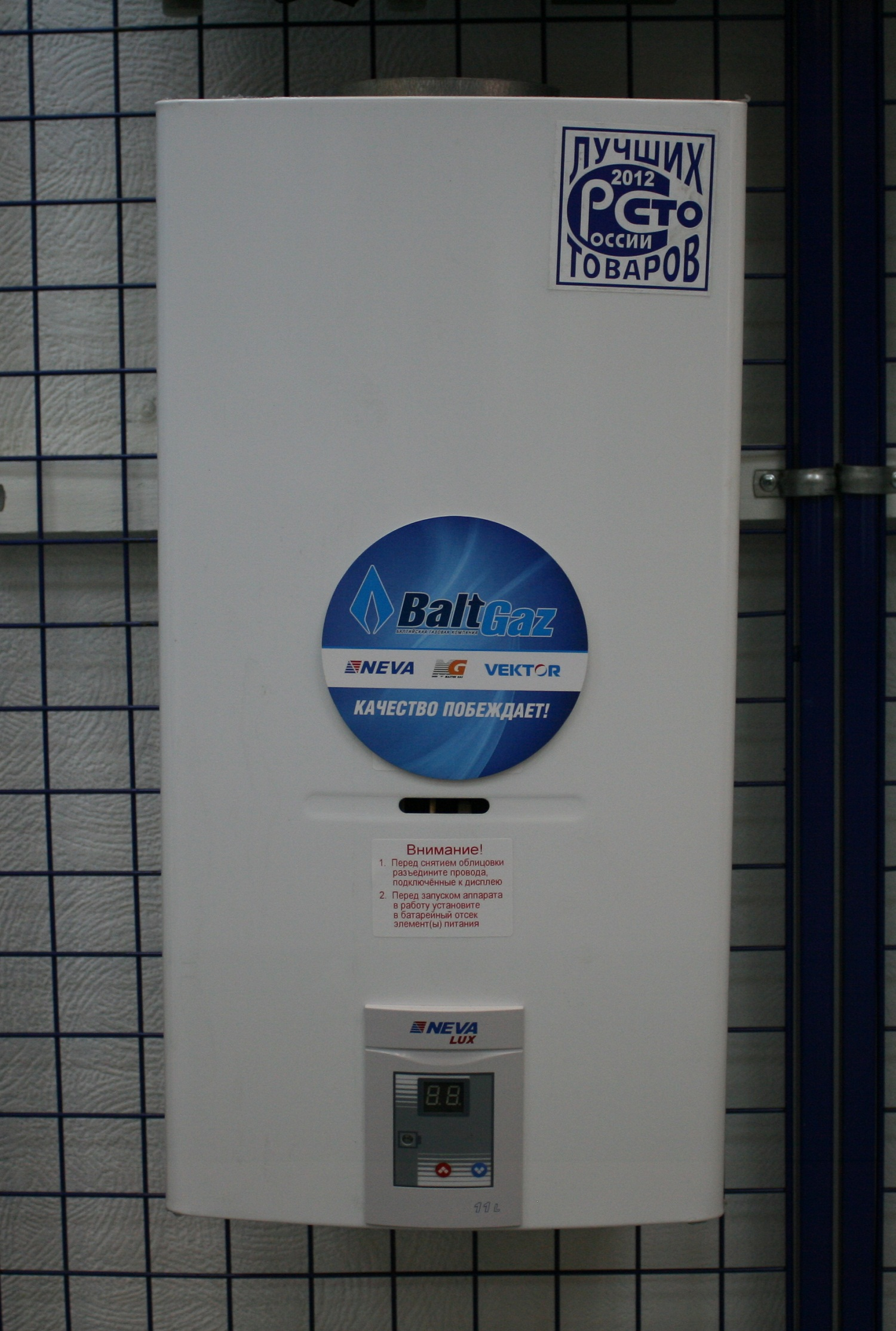
Gas water heater NEVALUX-6011

Main directions of activity:

- Production of wall-hung instantaneous gas water heaters, wall-hung gas boilers
- Wholesale and retail sales of household gas and electric appliances.
- Gasification of industrial facilities and dwelling houses
- Engineering systems installation
- Repair and maintenance service of household gas and electric appliances
- Effectuation of the whole set of works connected with heating and hot water supply
- Gas appliances replacement programs

== List of subsidiaries ==
At the moment the following companies are included into the BaltGaz Group:

- Gazapparat Ltd
- Armavirsky Plant of Gas Equipment Ltd
- Lengazapparat Ltd
- Health care and beauty clinic "BaltGaz"
- Restaurant "Runo.Ru"
- Recreation centre "Zhemchuzhina"
- Non-commercial organization of social and cultural programs "Kulturnaja Stolitsa"

== Key people ==
The Chairman of the BaltGaz Group since its founding in 1995 is Valiev M. R. In addition, Mr. Valiev is the Head of the District Executive Committee of the Party “United Russia” of the Resort district of Saint-Petersburg. Mr. Valiev also serves on the board of the National Cultural Autonomy of the Azerbaijanis in Saint-Petersburg, in connection with what often appears in the media Saint-Petersburg statements on behalf of the Azerbaijani Diaspora.

== Charity ==
Since 2004 BaltGaz Group actively takes part in the government program “Honours”.

In 2005 within the framework of the program more than 1000 wall-hung gas water heaters were given to the veterans of the World War II. Also BaltGaz Group participates in several governmental programs, held by the Administration of Saint-Petersburg, which aimed to the replacement and installation of gas equipment for disadvantaged people1.

== Interesting facts ==
The oldest water heater produced by “Lengazapparat” keeps on operating for 42 years.

The average working lifespan of the water heaters produced in Saint-Petersburg is about 30 years.

Since 1945 more than 16 million gas water heaters under the trade mark NEVA have been produced.
