= Ministry of Railways =

Index of articles associated with the same name

A Ministry of Railways is a Cabinet department that exists or has existed in many Commonwealth states as well as others. It generally occurs in countries where railroad transportation is a particularly important part of the national infrastructure. In countries that have railways, but no cabinet department specializing in overseeing them, this task will typically fall to a Ministry of Transport. The head of a Ministry of Railways is usually denoted Minister of Railways or Railway Minister.

Examples of Ministries of Railways include:

- Ministry of Railways (Bangladesh)
- Ministry of Railways (China)
- Ministry of Railways (India) (headed by the Minister of Railways (India))
- Ministry of Railways (Japan)
- Ministry of Railways (North Korea), which operates the Korean State Railway
- Ministry of Rail Transportation (Myanmar)
- Ministry of Railways (Pakistan)
- Ministry of Communication Routes of the Russian Empire
- People's Commissariat of Communication Routes of the Russian Socialist Federative Soviet Republic
- People's Commissariat of Communication Routes of the Soviet Union
- Ministry of Railways (Russia)
- Ministry of Railways (Soviet Union)
- Ministry of Railways (Turkmenistan)
- Minister of Railways (Victoria)
- Minister of Railways and Canals (Canada)
- Minister of Railways (New Zealand)
