= Yenisei electoral district =

Constituency of the Russian Republic

Yenisei
- Former Civilian constituency for the All-Russian Constituent Assembly
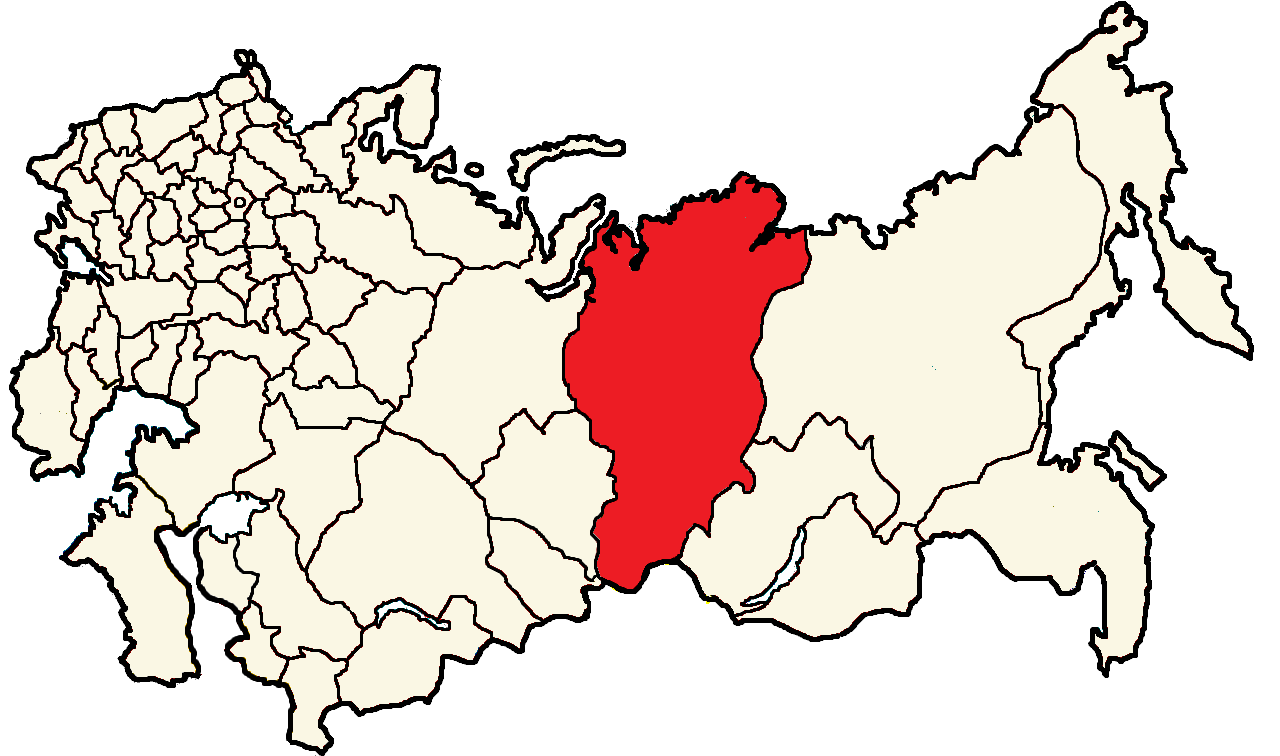

Former constituency
- Created: 1917
- Abolished: 1918
- Number of members: 6
- Number of Uyezd Electoral Commissions: 7
- Number of Urban Electoral Commissions: 1
- Number of Parishes: 103

The Yenisei electoral district (Russian: Енисейский избирательный округ) was a constituency created for the 1917 Russian Constituent Assembly election. The electoral district covered the Yenisei Governorate. Moreover, the Russian citizens living in the Uryankhay Kray formed part of the constituency.

One submitted peasants' candidate list was rejected by the electoral authorities. The SRs and Menshevik lists formed an electoral bloc, whilst the Bolsheviks and the leftist dissident SR list formed a second electoral bloc.

The election took place in state of chaos in the Yenisei district, as soldiers were demobilized and garrisons disbanded. The Bolsheviks claimed the area as the centre of their organization in Siberia, with the party dominating soviets in Krasnoyarsk, Achinsk and Kansk, but lacked influence outside these towns.

== Results ==
According to U.S. historian Oliver Henry Radkey, whose account is used in the table below, the results from Krasnoyarsk city and 5 out of 6 uezds appeared complete, with thinly populated Turukhansk uezd missing.

Yenisei
Party	Vote	%	Seats
List 3 - Socialist-Revolutionaries	229,723	64.48	4
List 2 - Bolsheviks	95,307	26.75	2
List 1 - Kadets	12,017	3.37	
List 6 - Popular Socialists	8,703	2.44	
List 4 - Mensheviks	4,531	1.27	
List 5 - Internationalists (leftist SRs)	3,668	1.03	
List 7 - Siberian Autonomist	2,299	0.65	
Total:	356,248		6

Deputies Elected
Okulov	Bolshevik
Rogov	Bolshevik
Eideman	SR
Fomin	SR
Gurov	SR
Kolosov	SR

In Krasnoyarsk town the Bolsheviks won the election, obtaining 12,170 votes (58.2%), followed by the SRs with 4,935 votes (23.6%), Kadets 2,649 votes (12.7%), Mensheviks 491 votes (2.3%), Popular Socialists 256 votes (1.2%), leftist SRs 217 votes (1%) and autonomists 214 votes (1%). In the Krasnoyarsk garrison the Bolshevik victory was even more pronounced, with 4,164 votes (77.5%), followed by the SRs with 817 votes (15.2%), Kadets 166 votes (3.1%), left SRs 111 votes (2.1%), Mensheviks 71 votes (1.3%), Popular Socialists 38 votes (0.7%) and 7 votes for the autonomists (0.1%).

In Achinsk uyezd the Bolshevik list obtained 50.6% of the votes, in Yenisei uyezd 38.6%, in Krasnoyarsk uyezd 28.8%, in Kansk uyezd 18.8% and in Minusinsk uyezd 11.4%.
