= People's Commissariat of Communication Routes of the Russian Socialist Federative Soviet Republic =

Russian SFSR Ministry of Railways in 1917–1923

- Народный комиссариат путей сообщения Российской Социалистической Федеративной Советской Республики

Agency overview
- Formed: 1917
- Preceding agency: Ministry of Communication Routes of the Russian Empire
- Dissolved: 1923
- Superseding agency: People's Commissariat of Communication Routes of the Soviet Union
- Jurisdiction: Russian Socialist Federative Soviet Republic
- Parent agency: Council of People's Commissars of the Russian Socialist Federative Soviet Republic

The People's Commissariat of Communication Routes of the Russian Socialist Federative Soviet Republic was a state body of the Russian Socialist Federative Soviet Republic, which controlled the activities of railway and other types of transport in Soviet Russia in 1917–1923.

== History ==
Initially, the People's Commissariat of Communication Routes was established by a decree of the Second All–Russian Congress of Soviets on November 8, 1917 as the People's Commissariat for Railway Affairs; was one of the first people's commissariats, formed in accordance with the decree "On the Establishment of the Council of People's Commissars".

In connection with the transfer to its jurisdiction of the Office of Inland Water Transport, it was renamed into the People's Commissariat of Communication Routes. However, by the decree of the Council of People's Commissars of February 27, 1918, the management of the waterways was transferred to the Supreme Council of the People's Economy, and the management of railways and the organization of railway transportation remained under the jurisdiction of the People's Commissariat of Communication Routes.

Since 1921, the management of automobile, horse–drawn and tram transport, loading and unloading and freight forwarding business in all modes of transport has been transferred to the jurisdiction of the People's Commissariat of Communication Routes.

On December 9, 1921, on the initiative of Felix Dzerzhinsky, the Decree of the All–Russian Central Executive Committee and the Council of Labor and Defense of the Republic "On the Protection of Warehouses, Goods Sheds and Storerooms, as Well as Structures on Railway and Waterways of Communication" was adopted, in accordance with which an armed Guard of Communications was created in the structure of the People's Commissariat of Communication Routes of the Russian Socialist Federal Soviet Republic, which stopped massive attacks on railway facilities, freight and passenger trains.

In 1923, after the formation of the Soviet Union, the People's Commissariat of Communication Routes of the Russian Socialist Federative Soviet Republic was transformed into the All–Union People's Commissariat of Communication Routes of the Soviet Union.

== People's Commissars of Communication Routes of the Russian Socialist Federative Soviet Republic ==
Mark Elizarov became the first People's Commissar. Also People's Commissars of Communication Routes were Leon Trotsky, Felix Dzerzhinsky. During the First World War and the Civil War, more than 60% of the network, 90% of the locomotive and 80% of the car fleet were destroyed.

People's Commissars	Term
Mark Elizarov	November 21, 1917 – January 20, 1918
Veniamin Sverdlov	January 20, 1918 – February 24, 1918
Aleksey Rogov	February 24, 1918 – May 9, 1918
Peter Kobozev	May 9, 1918 – June 1918
Vladimir Nevsky	June 25, 1918 – March 15, 1919
Leonid Krasin	March 30, 1919 – March 20, 1920
Leon Trotsky	March 30, 1920 – December 10, 1920
Alexander Emshanov	December 10, 1920 – April 14, 1921
Felix Dzerzhinsky	April 14, 1921 – July 6, 1923

== See also ==
- People's Commissariat of Communication Routes of the Soviet Union
- Ministry of Communication Routes
- List of ministers of communication routes of Russia
