= Council of Workers' and Peasants' Defense =

Council that coordinated mobilization of the economy and defense industry

- Совет Рабочей и Крестьянской Обороны
- All ministry seals of the Soviet Union used the USSR coat of arms

Agency overview
- Formed: 30 November 1918
- Dissolved: April 1920
- Superseding agency: Council of Labor and Defense
- Jurisdiction: USSR
- Headquarters: Moscow, Russia
- Agency executive: Chairman
- Parent agency: Council of People's Commissars of the RSFSR

The Council of Workers' and Peasants' Defense (Russian: Совет Рабочей и Крестьянской Обороны known also in its acronym SRKO) was the supreme emergency body of Soviet Russia, operating during the Russian Civil War and military intervention in 1918-1920, the main military-economic center of the RSFSR, which had full authority in mobilizing forces and resources for military needs to defend the Soviet Republic.

In April 1920, it was reorganized into the Council of Labor and Defense of the RSFSR (later the USSR).

== History ==
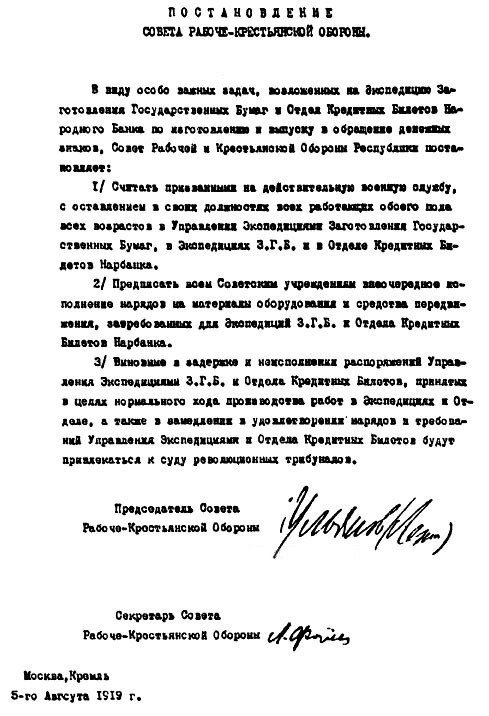
One of the resolution issued by the council

During the years of the Russian Civil War, in parallel with the constitutional (All-Russian Congress of Soviets, the All-Russian Central Executive Committee, the Council of People's Commissars of the RSFSR, local Soviets and their executive committees) extraordinary supreme and local authorities were created. The Council of Workers' and Peasants' Defense was created by the Resolution of the All-Russian Central Executive Committee of November 30, 1918, in pursuance of the Resolution of the All-Russian Central Executive Committee of September 2, 1918 "The Soviet Republic is a military camp".

In the absence of a viable market economy, the Soviet state needed a mechanism for the coordination of production and distribution to serve the direct needs of the military. On November 30, 1918, the All-Russian Central Executive Committee (executive authority of the Congress of Soviets) created a bureaucratic entity designed for this purpose, initially called the Council of Workers' and Peasants' Defense. This bureau was presented with the task of gathering and disbursing resources needed for the war effort.

The Council of Workers' and Peasants' Defense was originally conceived as an emergency body dedicated solely to the mobilization of Russia's resources for the fighting of the civil war. Lenin himself was named as chairman, Leon Trotsky sat as the People's Commissar of War, Leonid Krassin as head of the extraordinary commission of supply, and Joseph Stalin as the representative of the All-Russian Executive Committee.

The organization quickly emerged as what historian Alec Nove has called the "effective economic cabinet" of the nation, with the power to issue legally binding decrees. For the duration of the civil war, running up to early 1921, the Council of Workers' and Peasants' Defense existed as an ad hoc basis, issuing its decrees on the basis that a national emergency existed and largely unconcerned with long-term planning processes. The council instead concentrated upon day-to-day exigencies related to the life or death military campaign.

The Council of Workers' and Peasants' Defense was the main emergency military-economic and planning center of the RSFSR during the war. The activities of the Revolutionary Military Council and other military bodies were placed under the control of the Council.

Vladimir Lenin, as the Chairman of the Council of People's Commissars of the RSFSR, was appointed Chairman of the Defense Council. In addition to him, the Council included: Chairman of the Revolutionary Military Council of the Republic Leon Trotsky, People's Commissar of Railways Vladimir Nevsky, Deputy People's Commissar of Food Nikolai Bryukhanov, Chairman of the Extraordinary Commission for the Production of Supplies (later the Extraordinary Commission for the Supply of the Red Army) L. B. Krasin and representative of the All-Russian Central Executive Committee Joseph Stalin. Secretary of the Council of People's Commissars Lydia Fotiyeva was appointed Secretary of the Council.

The main feature of the emergency body of the Civil War was that it did not replace the party, government and military bodies, but performed, first of all, coordinating functions. In particular, the relationship between the Defense Council and the Council of People's Commissars was determined by the inclusion of all members of the former in the composition of the latter and their common chairmanship. Thanks to this, the Council became, in fact, a permanent military-economic committee of the workers' and peasants' government.

The Council's activities mainly concerned war-related issues, such as combating desertion, organizing mobilization, universal military training, etc. The Council was tasked with increasing labor productivity everywhere to supply the army, providing food for the army, navy, Moscow, Petrograd and other industrial centers, ensuring uninterrupted operation of food and transport agencies, establishing military discipline in the army, navy, food and transport sectors. One of the most important areas was legislative support for the effective functioning of the state apparatus, the complete and timely implementation of directives from senior management by local authorities. In order to solve the tasks set, relevant committees and commissions were created and operated under the council. Thus, at the end of December 1918, the Central Temporary Commission was established to directly implement measures to combat desertion, consisting of representatives of the All-Russian General Staff, the All-Russian Bureau of Military Commissars and the People's Commissariat of Internal Affairs. In the resolutions adopted by the Council "On Desertion", "On Measures to Combat Desertion" and "On Measures to Eradicate Desertion", it was equated with treason and classified as one of the most serious and shameful crimes.

In wartime, the key issue was maintaining and replenishing the number of troops. Attempts to found a multi-million Red Army on a voluntary basis under the slogan "The Socialist Fatherland is in Danger!" were unsuccessful, it was necessary to carry out a rapid transition to mobilization. Based on this need, on May 29, 1918, on the basis of the Resolution of the All-Russian Central Executive Committee "On Compulsory Recruitment into the Workers' and Peasants' Army", conscription into the Red Army began. Having received the appropriate authority, on May 12, 1919, the Defense Council adopted the Resolution "On the conscription of soldiers of the disbanded old army who have returned or are returning from captivity". The same goals were served by the Resolutions of the Council of Workers' and Peasants' Defense "On the conscription of citizens born in 1901", "On the conscription of citizens born in 1888, 1887 and 1886", "On the appearance for conscription of persons hiding their former officer rank" and others. All those who evaded conscription and those who hid them were subject to severe liability on the basis of the laws of the military-revolutionary time. As a result, if in mid-1918 there were 378 thousand people under arms in the Red Army, by the end of the year - 1700 thousand, then by the end of 1919 there were 4400 thousand people in it, and in 1920 - already 5300 thousand.

As was the case with the parallel government planning organization Council of Labor and Defense and its glavki, the Council of Workers' and Peasants' Defense had a set of specialized subcommittees dedicated to specific aspects of the military industries. In many cases the two organizations attempted to extend their own influence and agendas within the same industries. Productive industry remained in crisis as authorities threw manpower and resources from one critical bottleneck to the next, creating new shortages in the process of attempting to solve standing problems.

From 1919 the authority of Vesenkha began to wane, with the People's Commissariat of Agriculture (Narkomzem) in charge of grain requisitions and the Council of Workers' and Peasants' Defense gaining power in the industrial sphere. The mobilization of unskilled labor, including labor service by peasants demanded by local government authorities for the transport of fuel, food, and military supplies, was made the province of the People's Commissariat of Labor (Narkomtrud). Vesenkha was reduced to one of several central economic authorities, and by no means the superior.

One beneficiary of the institutional atrophy experience by Vesenkha was the Council of Workers' and Peasants' Defense. The authority of the organization was bolstered n the summer of 1919 by the appointment of top-ranking Bolshevik Alexei Rykov as the "extraordinary representative," further accentuating the place of the organization as first among equals in the planning firmament. For the duration of the civil war a large percentage of the output of Soviet industry would be dedicated to the needs of the Red Army, the supply of which was characterized as "the cornerstone of our economic policy" by one leading economic official. The Council of Workers' and Peasants' Defense was given charge of all supplies to the Red Army except for agricultural products and was the primary controller and user of the nation's industrial output, limited though it may have been. In April 1920 it was reformed into the Council of Labor and Defense.

== Bibliography ==
- Самсонов, А. М. (1983). Краткая история СССР. Москва: Наука. p. 80.
- Джузеппе, Боффа (1990). "История Советского Союза". Международные отношения. 1. Мoscow. ISBN 5-7133-0543-0.
