= Vasily Nemchinov =

Soviet economist and mathematician

- Василий Немчинов
- Born: Vasily Sergeyevich Nemchinov; 14 January 1894; Grabovo, Penzensky Uyezd, Penza Governorate, Russian Empire
- Died: 5 November 1964 (aged 70); Moscow, Soviet Union
- Scientific career
- Fields: Economics, mathematics
- Workplaces: Central Economic Mathematical Institute

Vasily Sergeyevich Nemchinov (Russian: Василий Cергеевич Немчинов; 14 January 1894 – 5 November 1964) was a Soviet and Russian economist and mathematician. Nemchinov is credited with introducing mathematical methods into Soviet economics, thus creating a scientific basis for central planning.

== Biography ==
Nemchinov was born in Grabovo. He attended secondary school in Chelyabinsk until 1913. He then studied at the economics department of the Moscow Institute of Commerce (Russian: Московский коммерческий институт). After graduation in 1917 he began to work as an economist and statistician for the local government in the Chelyabinsk Oblast.

== Works ==
- "On the Statistical Study of Rural Class Stratification", 1926, Bulleting of Urals Regional Statistical Admin.
- "Experience from the Classification of Peasant Households", Vestnik statistiki.
- The Use of Mathematics in Economics, 3 volumes, 1959-65.
- Methods and Models of Mathematical Economics, 1967-9.
- Selected Works, 1967-9.

== Honors ==
- Three Orders of Lenin (1939, 1946, 1964)
- Two Orders of the Red Banner of Labour (1940, 1944)
- Order of the Red Star (1945)
- Stalin Prize (1946)
- Honorary member of the Royal Statistical Society (1961)
- Lenin Prize (1965, posthumously)
