= Ministry of Communication Routes of the Russian Empire =

Government agency

- Министерство путей сообщения Российской империи
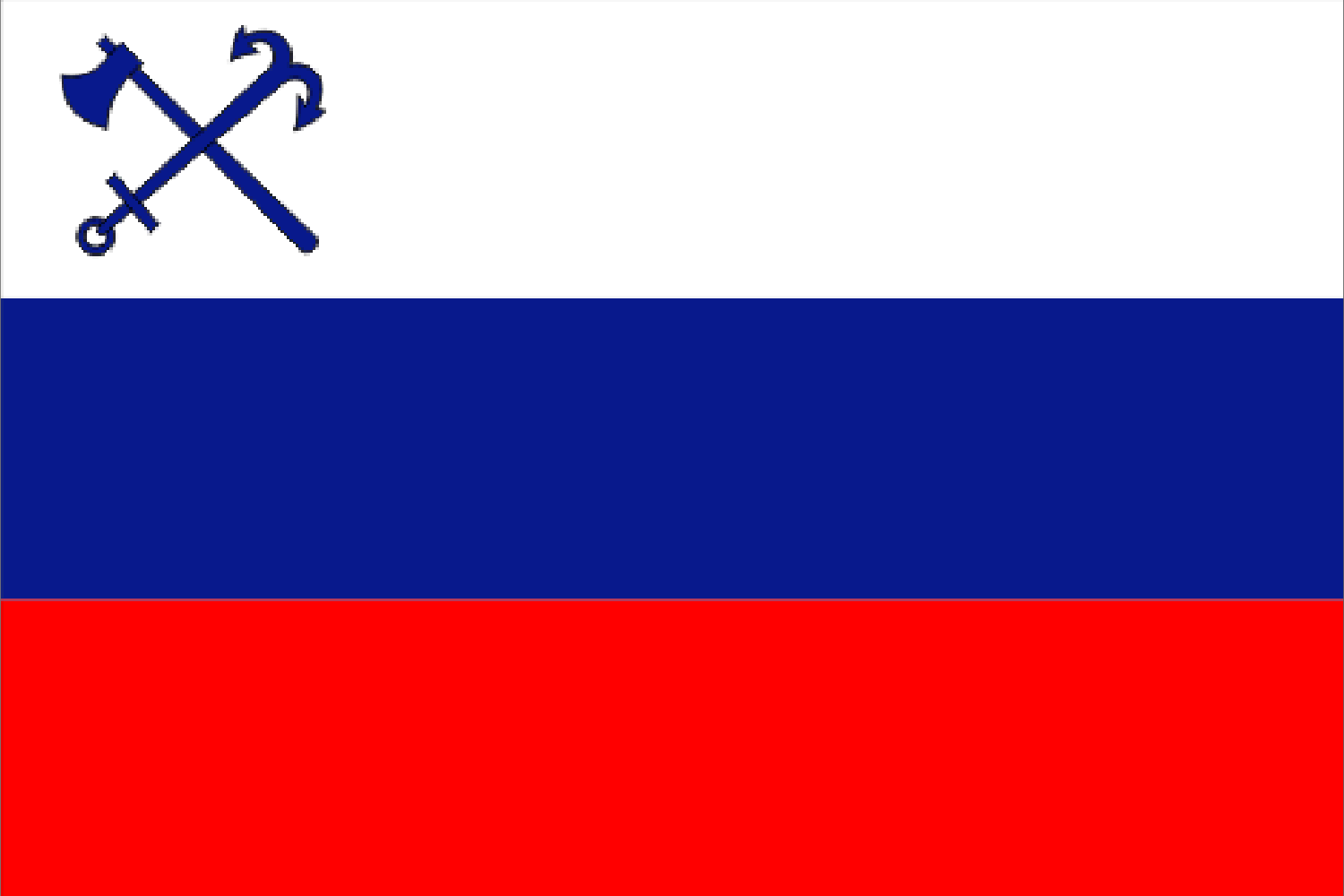
- Flag of the ministry used from 1870

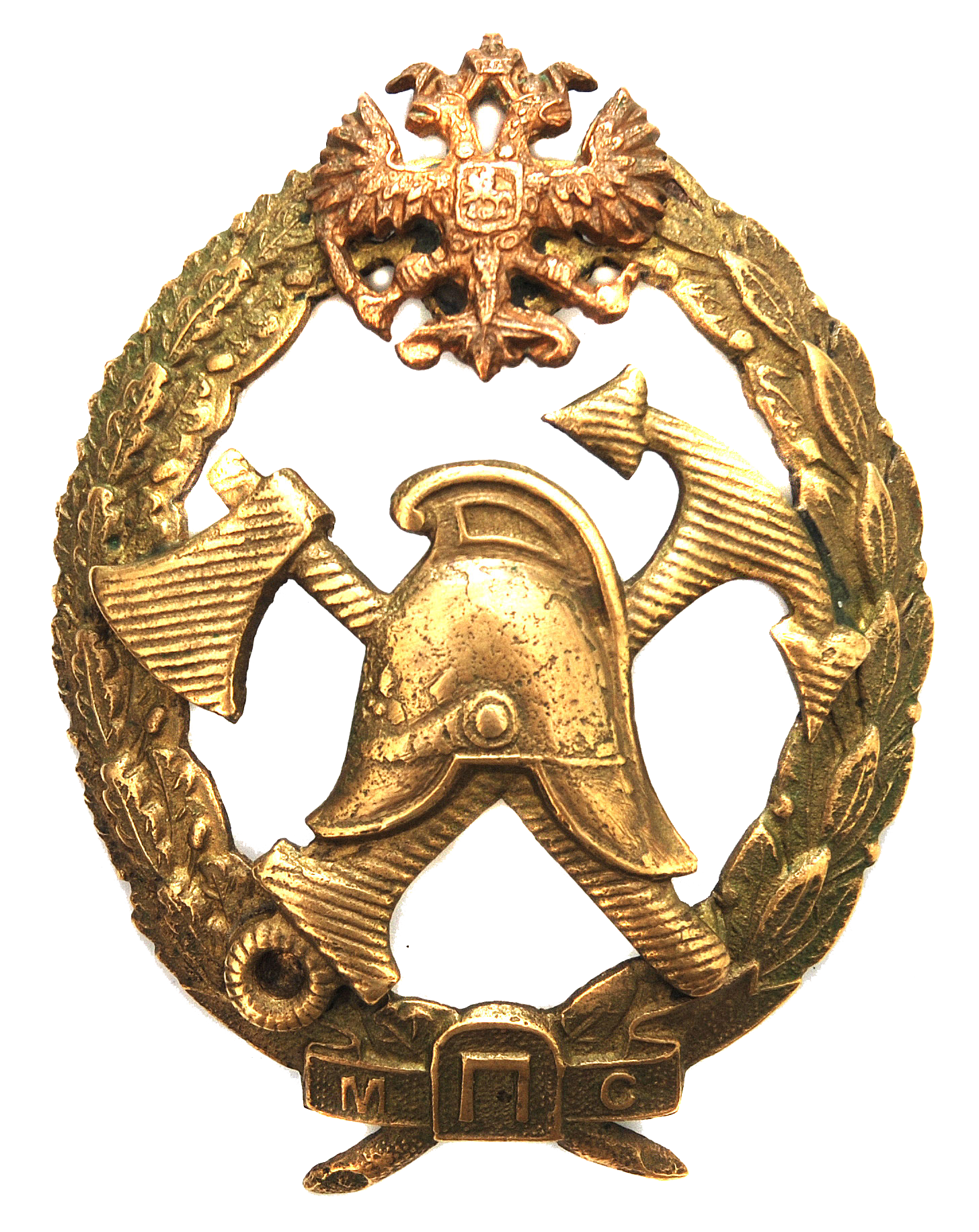
- Badge of fire brigades under the jurisdiction of the Ministry of Communication Routes

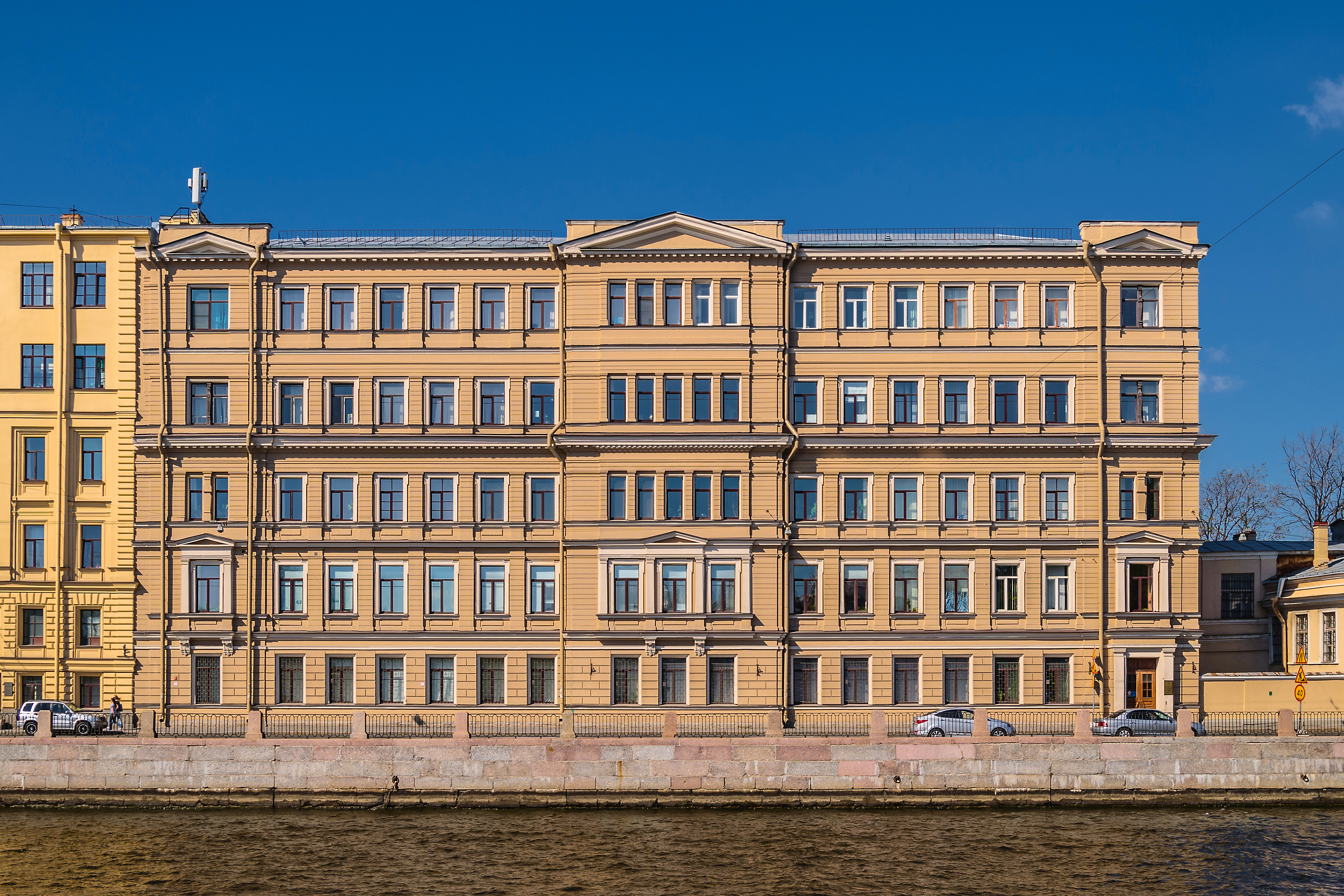
- Ministry headquarters in Saint Petersburg

Agency overview
- Formed: 16 June 1865
- Dissolved: 1917
- Superseding agency: People's Commissariat of Communication Routes of the RSFSR
- Headquarters: Saint Petersburg
- Parent agency: Council of Ministers

Ministry of Communication Routes of the Russian Empire (Russian: Министерство путей сообщения Российской империи) was the central government agency in the Russian Empire that ensured the implementation of a unified policy in the sphere of water, land and rail transport, and also carried out general management in the field of transport communications. It was located in Saint Petersburg, on the Fontanka Embankment, 117 and was part of the Council of Ministers of the Russian Empire.

== History ==
The date of the formation of the ministry is considered to be 16 June 1865, but the systematic activity of the government in the field of communications began back in 1649, when Tsar Alexei Mikhailovich issued the "Code on the Protection of Shipping".

Under Peter I, the capital of the state was moved to Saint Petersburg. The Collegium of Commerce was established, which supervised land roads. The transfer of the capital led to the need to build new communication routes for the new capital: first of all, the Vyshny Volochyok Waterway began operating in 1709, and secondly, in 1712, construction of the Moscow–Saint Petersburg highway began, for which the Chancellery of the Prospective Road was established, which in 1742 took over the functions of monitoring land roads from the Commerce Collegium, and after it was completed in 1746, in 1748 it was named the Commission on Roads in the State, which in 1755 formed the Chancellery of the Construction of State Roads. In 1798, Emperor Paul I approved the project for the formation of the Department of Water Communications, which was headed by Nikolay Rumyantsev. Under Rumyantsev, the department "for the educational part" was expanded in the department. Nikolai Petrovich realized the acute shortage of civil engineers required for the accelerated construction of communication routes. He issued recommendations for training a group of specialists in England and France, on the other hand, he invited scientists and engineers to Russia to design and build highways, bridges, bypass canals, stone abutments and other technical structures. He created the first transport library in Russia in the department, as well as a model room with copies of engineering structures and mechanisms. The department operated successfully under Rumyantsev and in 1809 expanded its powers and was renamed the Directorate of Water and Land Communications. On the basis built by Rumyantsev, in the same 1809, the Corps of Communication Engineers was created and within it the military Institute of the Communication Corps.

From 1820 to 1832, the department was called the "Main Directorate of Communications", and from 1833 to 1842 – the "Main Directorate of Communications and Public Buildings".

On 31 October 1839, the position of assistant to the Chief Directorate of Communications was established, to which Lieutenant General Engineer Aleksandr Devyatnin was appointed. Since 1840, due to the increased volume of paperwork, two Departments of the Chief Directorate of Communications and Public Buildings were formed – the 1st Department (for the construction of highways and waterways) was headed by Major General Engineer Aleksey Rokasovsky; the 2nd Department (shipping and public buildings) – State Councilor Vladimirov. In 1842, by decree of 17 August, the Department of Railways was created in the Directorate, with Konstantin Fisher appointed director.

The Department headed the construction of the Saint Petersburg–Moscow railway (1842–1851). In 1862, the Saint Petersburg–Warsaw railway and the Moscow-Nizhny Novgorod Railway were completed. By the 1860s, the rapid development of industry required the formation of a reliable transport system. On 15 June 1865, Emperor Alexander II issued a decree establishing the Ministry of Railways of the Russian Empire. Management of public buildings was transferred to the Ministry of Internal Affairs, and the telegraph to the Main Postal Department. The Department of Railways was retained within the ministry, and the Office of the Chief Inspector of Private Railways was created. Pavel Petrovich Melnikov was appointed the first Minister of Railways. Following the October Revolution, the ministry was dissolved and was succeeded by the People's Commissariat of Communication Routes of the RSFSR on 26 October (8 November) 1917.

== Ministers ==
Name	Term start	Term end
Pavel Melnikov (1804—1880)	23 June 1865	20 April 1869
Vladimir Bobrinsky (1824—1898)	20 April 1869	2 September 1871
Alexey Bobrinsky (1826—1894)	2 September 1871	10 July 1874
Konstantin Posyet (1819—1899)	10 July 1874	7 November 1888
German Pauker (1822—1889)	7 November 1888	29 March 1889
Adolf Gyubbenet (1830—1901)	30 March 1889	17 January 1892
Sergei Witte (1849—1915)	15 February 1892	30 August 1892
Apollon Krivoshein (1833—1902)	30 August 1892	16 December 1894
Mikhail Khilkov (1834—1909)	4 January 1895	25 October 1905
Klavdy Nemeshayev (1849—1927)	28 October 1905	24 April 1906
Nikolai Shaufus (1846—1911)	25 April 1906	29 January 1909
Sergey Rukhlov (1852—1918)	29 January 1909	27 October 1915
Alexander Trepov (1862—1928)	30 October 1915	27 December 1916
Eduard Kriger-Voinovsky (1864—1933)	28 December 1916	28 February 1917
