= Aleksey Rogov =

Aleksey Rogov may refer to:

- Aleksey Rogov (footballer)
- Aleksey Rogov (politician)
