= Defence Board =

Defence Board or Defense Board may refer to:

- Defence Board of the United Kingdom
- Antigua and Barbuda Defence Board
- Defense Business Board
- Defense Policy Board Advisory Committee

== See also ==
- Defence Council
- National security council
