= Pyotr Kleinmichel =

Russian soldier and bureaucrat (1789–1869)

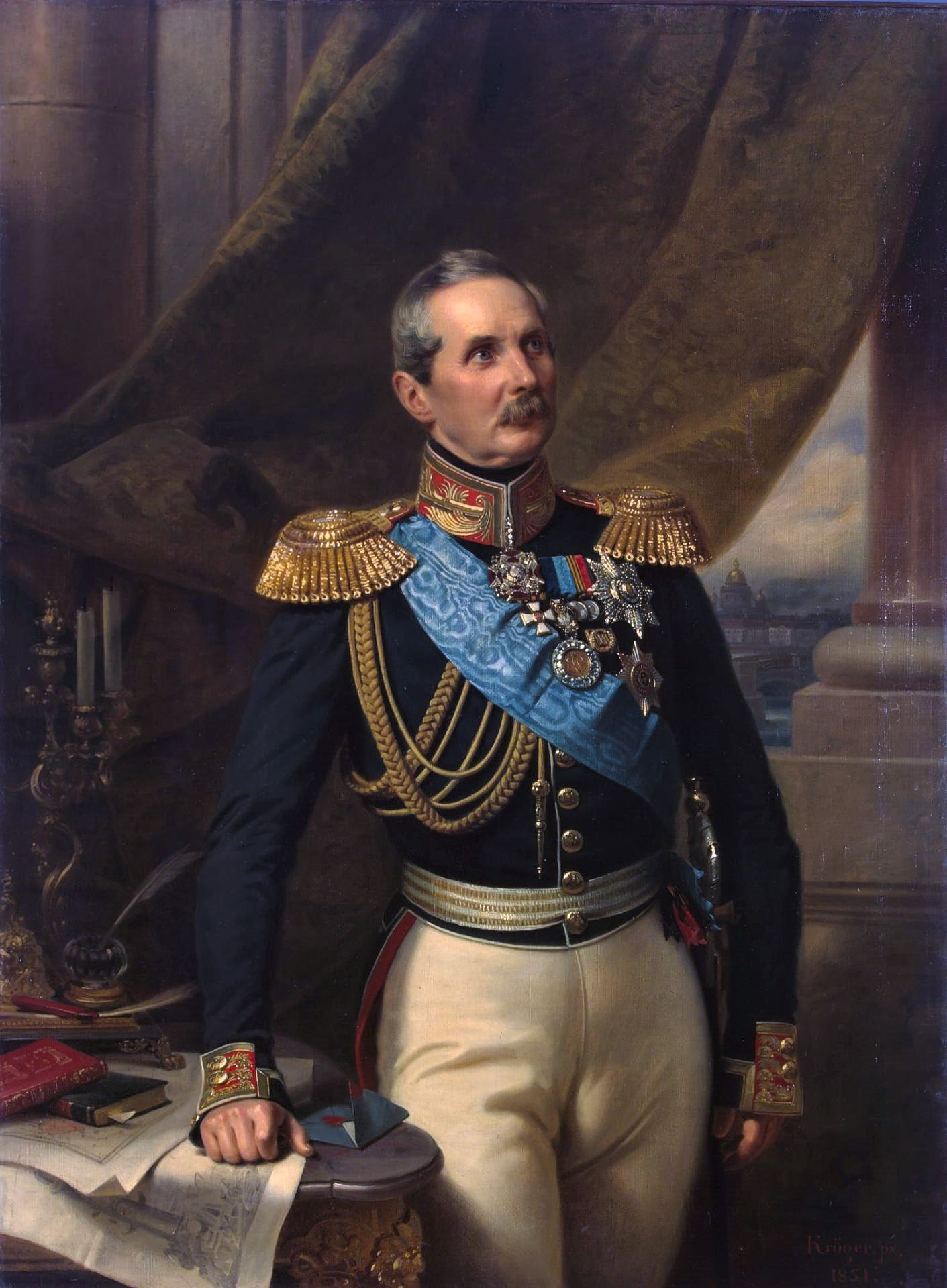
Pyotr Kleinmichel, painted by Franz Krüger

Count Pyotr Andreevich Kleinmichel (Russian: Пётр Андре́евич Клейнми́хель, romanized: Pyotr Andreyevich Kleynmikhel), also known by his German name Peter von Kleinmichel (30 November 1789 – 3 February 1869), was a Russian politician who served as the minister of transport from 1842 to 1855.

He fought at the Battle of Leipzig and the Battle of Borodino. In March 1814, Alexander I was concerned for the safety of his brothers Nicholas and Constantine, who were involved in the occupation of Paris. He dispatched Kleinmichel to warn them and advise them to return to Basel. After succeeding in this, Kleinmichel was made Aide-de-Camp to the Tsar. The event also brought him to the attention of the future Tsar Nicholas I

He was responsible for building the Saint Petersburg–Moscow Railway and for restoring the Winter Palace after the 1837 fire. It was rumored that Nicholas I promoted his career because Kleinmichel adopted the Emperor's illegitimate children as his own. His first wife divorced him, citing his sexual dysfunction.

== Family ==
Kleinmichel was married twice, first in 1816 to Varvara Kokoshkina (died 1842), the granddaughter of the business magnate Alexei Turchaninov. They divorced, according to rumours, because of his impotence.

In 1832 Kleinmichel married Kleopatra Petrovna Ilyinskaya (October 17, 1811 – January 17, 1865), a relative of Nicholas I's mistress Varvara Nelidova. She died of tuberculosis in Paris, and was buried in St. Petersburg. She was known in society for adopting Nicholas's illegitimate children. They had eight children.

- Yelizaveta (1833–1896), married the lieutenant general Pilar von Pilchau.
- Aleksandra (1835–1912), lady-in-waiting.
- Nikolai (1836–1878), major general, married Countess Maria von Keller (1846–1931), granddaughter of Countess Amalie zu Sayn-Wittgenstein-Berleburg-Ludwigsburg, sister of Prince Peter zu Sayn-Wittgenstein, who, as Marie Kleinmichel, was the author of Memories of a Shipwrecked World. They had one surviving daughter, Olga.
- Alexander (1837–1856)
- Vladimir (1839–1882), major general
- Konstantin (1840–1912)
- Olga (1845–1920)
- Mikhail (1848–1872), died in Paris.

Political offices
Preceded by Karl Wilhelm von Toll	Minister of Transport of Russia; 1842–1855	Succeeded by Konstantin Chevkin

== Sources ==
- "Клейнмихель, Петр Андреевич" . Brockhaus and Efron Encyclopedic Dictionary (in Russian). 1906.
