= Varvara Nelidova =

Russian imperial mistress (1814–1897)

Varvara Arkadyevna Nelidova (Варвара Аркадьевна Нелидова, 1814–1897) was a mistress of Nicholas I of Russia from 1832 until his death in 1855. Her aunt Yekaterina Nelidova was a mistress of Nicholas' father Paul, and her maternal grandfather was Count Friedrich Wilhelm von Buxhoeveden.

Nicholas discontinued visits to his wife's bedroom and set his sights on Nelidova after the court doctors had declared that sex might be detrimental to the frail health of the Empress and that another childbirth might prove fatal for her.

Nelidova's liaison with the Tsar was kept more or less secret, giving rise to never ending speculations about its length and the number of children she had with him. According to Nikolay Dobrolyubov, their several children were adopted by her relative, Peter von Kleinmichel, Russia's Minister of Communications.

Nelidova is also claimed to have been the mother of Baron Paskhin, an 8-year-old boy who was made a Baron of the Austrian Empire in 1839. His surname is derived from the feast of Pascha, for he was born on Easter Sunday. No documentation as to his parentage survives, however.

Nelidova's secretive relationship with the Tsar is the subject of Yuri Tynyanov's novella Young Vitushishnikov (1933) and is briefly mentioned by Leo Tolstoy in Hadji Murat.
