= Pavel Petrovich Melnikov =

Russian engineer and administrator

Pavel Melnikov
- Павел Мельников
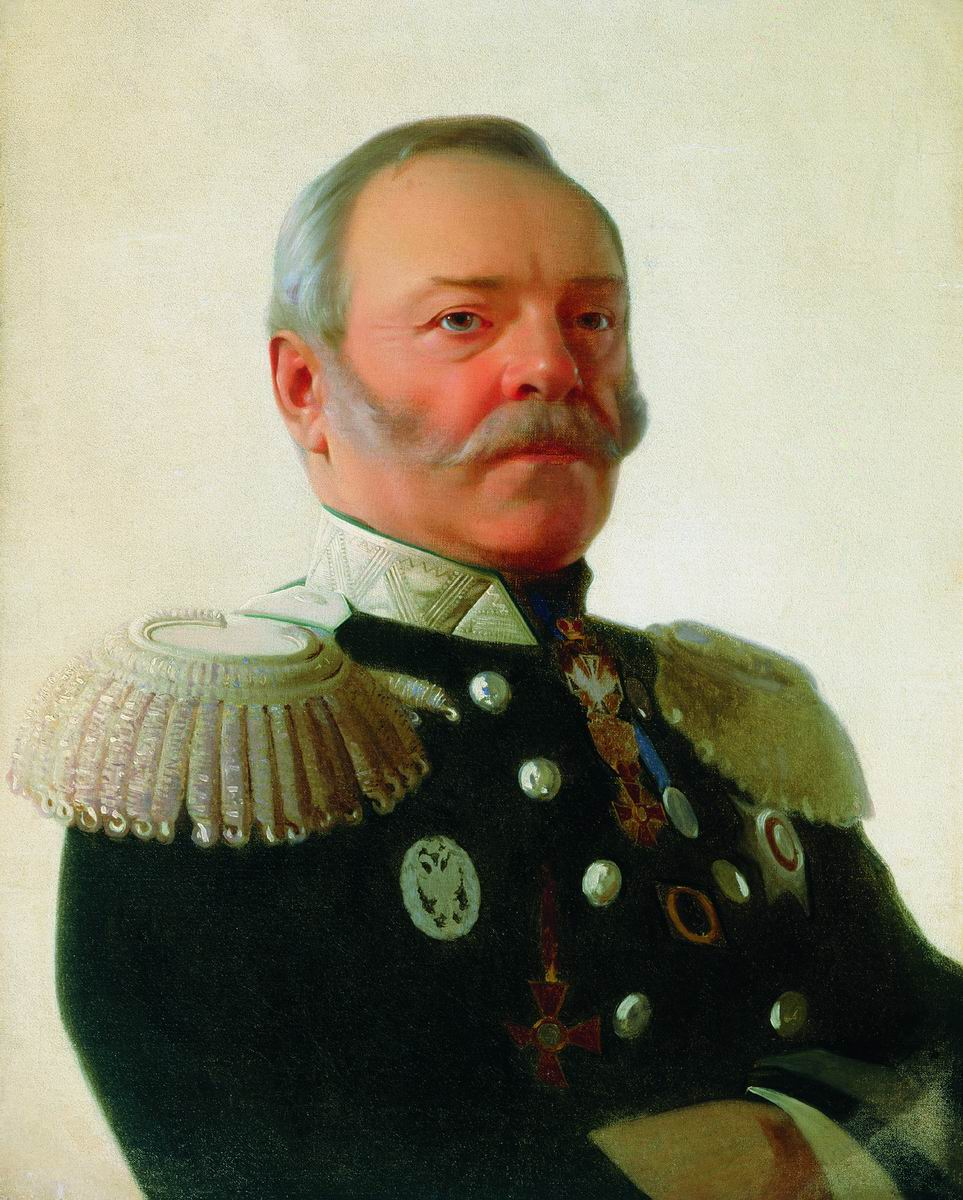
- Portrait of the Minister of Railways Pavel P. Melnikov (by Sergey Zaryanko, 1869)

Ministry of Communication Routes of the Russian Empire
- In office 1865–1869
- Monarch: Alexander II
- Preceded by: position established; he himself, as Chief Manager of Communications and Public Buildings
- Succeeded by: Vladimir Bobrinsky [ru]

Chief Manager of Communications and Public Buildings
- In office 1862–1865
- Monarch: Alexander II
- Preceded by: Konstantin Chevkin
- Succeeded by: position abolished; he himself, as Minister of Communication Routes

Personal details
- Born: 3 August 1804 Moscow
- Died: 3 August 1880 (aged 76) Lyuban
- Resting place: Lyuban
- Education: St. Petersburg State Transport University
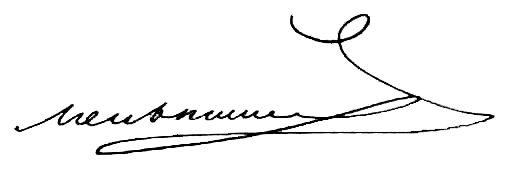
- Signature
- Military career
- Branch: Imperial Russian Army
- Service years: 1822–1880
- Rank: Engineer General [ru]

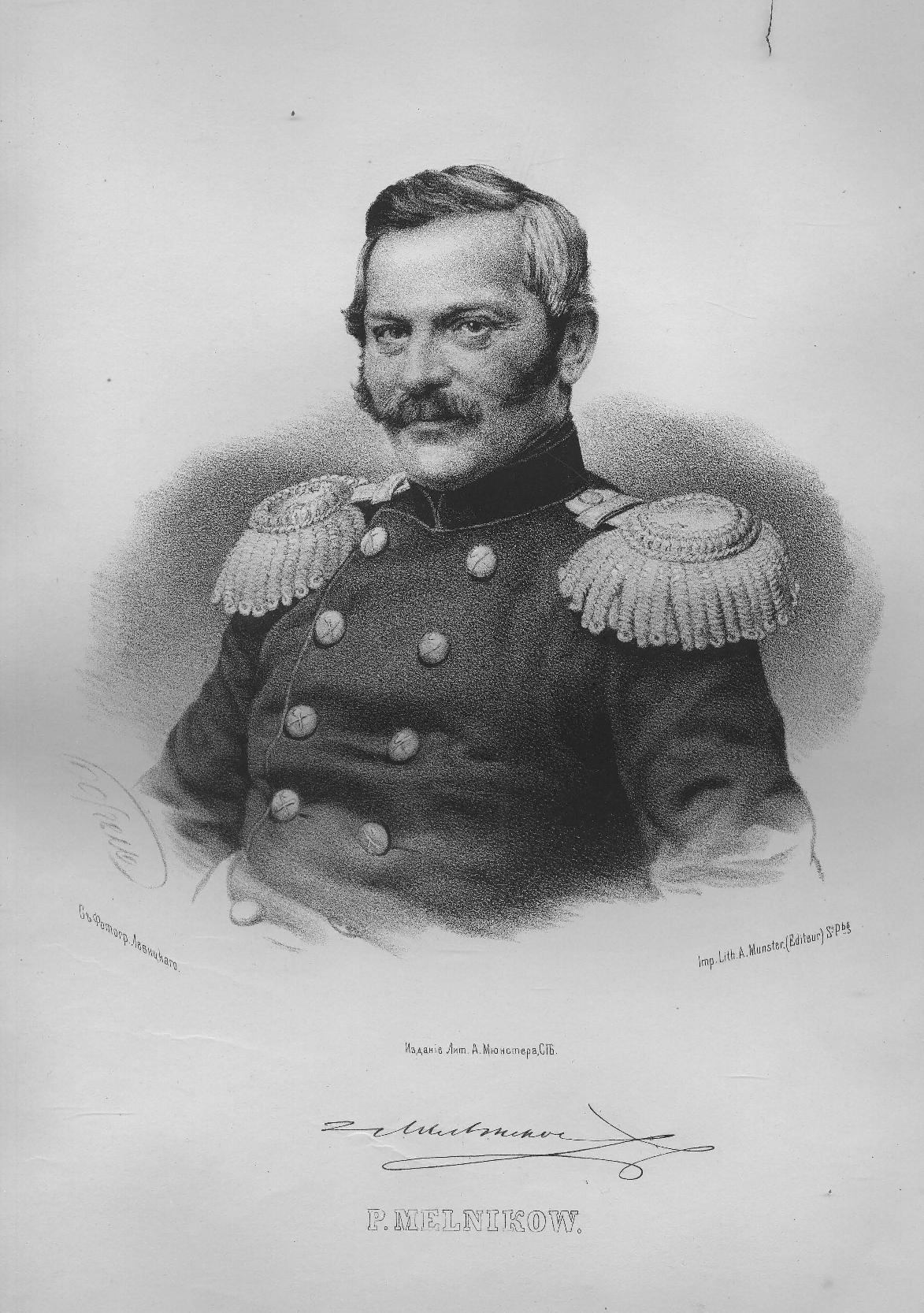
Pavel Petrovich Melnikov, 1865

Statue of Melnikov on Komsomolskaya Square, Moscow

Pavel Petrovich Melnikov (Russian: Павел Петрович Мельников, 3 August [O.S. 22 July] 1804 – 3 August [O.S. 22 July] 1880 in Lyuban) was a Russian engineer and administrator who, in his capacity as Transport Minister, was in a large measure responsible for the introduction of railroad construction in Imperial Russia.

== Life ==
In 1825 Melnikov graduated at the head of his class from the Institute of Transport Engineers (predecessor of the St. Petersburg State Transport University) in the School for Communication Routes with the rank of Lieutenant in the Corps of Transport Engineers. He remained as a teacher at the Institute, becoming professor of applied mechanics in 1833. He also took part in several construction projects to improve the Russian network of rivers and canals. In 1833 he joined the St. Petersburg Artillery School. he was also responsible for repairing the wooden cupola of the Trinity Cathedral in St Petersburg. In the Summer of 1839 Melnikov and another colonel, Nikolai Osipovich Kraft (1798-1857), were sent to the United States to inspect its railroad system and recommend technology to be used in Russia. The travellers returned in the autumn of 1840.

The report regarding U.S. railroads which Melnikov compiled upon his and Kraft's return to their homeland, for submission to the imperial Russian authorities, is a massive contribution to American industrial and transportation history. Written in longhand in 1841 and now found in manuscript form in the library of St. Petersburg State Transportation University, this 3-part, 664-page work is entitled Technical Description of the railways of the North American States (Opisanie v tekhnicheskom otnoshenii zheleznykh dorog Severoamerikanskikh Shtatov). In 1842, the journal Zhurnal Putei Soobshcheniya (Transport Journal) provided readers with extensive access to Melnikov's findings by publishing them in serial form in volume (Tom) II, book (Kniga) 1, pages 19–85; and in book 2, pages 95 to 197. A further separate article, entitled "Foundations of Railways," is in book 3 for 1842, pages 209-265. Still another article, "Regarding operations to outfit (ustroistvo) railways in the North American States," is in volume II, book 4, pages 285-374 (extensively covering earthmoving tasks, principally), and volume III, book 1, pages 1–70. Taken together, these writings are qualitatively on a par with those of Franz Anton von Gerstner, who visited the United States for the same purpose at the same time and also produced a multivolume compilation on U.S. transportation of that time, available in English under the title EARLY AMERICAN RAILROADS.

Melnikov was sufficiently observant about America to note on page 65 of the Journal Article, volume I, book I, that the United States was a nation that was "little inclined to be subjected to the influence of routine," i.e. had a palpable dynamism.

Based on his experience Melnikov suggested the adoption of a 5-foot wide gauge for the planned Moscow–St. Petersburg Railway. (Previously, only a short line connecting St. Petersburg to Tsarskoe Selo had been built in 1836–37 under Franz Anton von Gerstner.) The gauge was approved as the new standard on 12 September 1842.

When construction of the Moscow–St. Petersburg Railway began in 1842 Melnikov was appointed to manage the construction of its northern part. From 1862 he was the chief manager of the railway, served as the Transport Minister from 1866 to 1869 and as a member of the Railroads Committee from 1870 to 1875.

Melnikov also contributed to water transportation systems and other engineering projects. He is the author of the first books about railroad construction ever written in Russian.

Political offices
Preceded by Konstantin Chevkin	Minister of Transport (Russia); 1862–1869	Succeeded by Vladimir Bobrinsky
