= List of transport ministers of Russia =

This is the list of transport ministers of Russia.

== Imperial Russia ==
- Prince Peter Friedrich Georg of Holstein and Oldenburg (1809–1812)
- Franz Devolant (1812–1818)
- Agustín de Betancourt (1819–1822)
- Duke Alexander of Württemberg (1822–1833)
- Karl Wilhelm von Toll (1833–1842)
- Pyotr Kleinmichel (1842–1855)
- Konstantin Chevkin (1855–1862)
- Pavel Melnikov (1862–1869)
- Vladimir Bobrinsky (1869–1871)
- Alexei Bobrinsky (1871–1874)
- Konstantin Posyet (1874–1888)
- Hermann von Paucker (1888–1889)
- Adolf von Hübbenent (1889–1892)
- Sergei Witte (February–August, 1892)
- Apollon Krivoshein (1892–1894)
- Prince Mikhail Khilkoff (1895–1905)
- Klavdiy Nemeshayev (1905–1906)
- Nikolai Shafgauzen-Shenberg-Ek-Shaufus (1906–1909)
- Sergei Rukhlov (1909–1915)
- Alexander Trepov (1915–1916)
- Eduard Kriger-Voinovsky (1916–1917)
- Nikolai Nekrasov (March 2, 1917 – July 4, 1917)
- Georgi Takhtamyshev (July 11–24, 1917)
- Pyotr Yurenev (July 25 – August 31, 1917)
- Alexander Liverovsky (August 31 - October 25, 1917)

== Russian SFSR and Soviet Union ==
- Mark Yelizarov (October 28, 1917 – February 1918)
- Aleksey Rogov (February – May, 1918)
- Pyotr Kobozev (May – July, 1918)
- Vladimir Nevsky (July 1918 – March 1919)
- Leonid Krasin (1919-1920)
- Leon Trotsky (March 25 - December 10, 1920)
- Alexander Yemshanov (December 10, 1920 - 1921)
- Felix Dzerzhinsky (1921-1924)
- Yan Rudzutak (1924-1930)
- Moisey Rukhimovich (June 11 – October 2, 1931)
- Andrei Andreyev (1931–1935)
- Lazar Kaganovich (1935–1937, 1938–1942, 1943–1947)
- Alexei Bakulin (1937–1938)
- Andrey Khrulyov (1942–1943)
- Ivan Kovalyov (1944–1948)
- Boris Beschev (1948–1956)
- Gleb Kolesnikov ( 1956 - 1982)
- Nikolai Konaryov (1982–1991)
- Leonid Matyukhin (May 8 – November 26, 1991)

== Russian Federation ==
=== Ministers of railways ===
- Gennady Fadeyev (November 26, 1991 – August 22 1996, January 4, 2002 – September 22, 2003)
- Anatoly Zaytsev (August 22, 1996 – April 14, 1997)
- Nikolai Aksyonenko (April 14, 1997 – May 21, 1999, September 16, 1999 – January 3, 2002)
- Vladimir Starostenko (May 29 – September 16, 1999)
- Vadim Morozov (October 7, 2003 – March 9, 2004)

=== Ministers of transport ===
No.	Portrait	Minister of Transport	Took office	Left office	Time in office	Party	Cabinet
1	Vitaly Yefimov	Vitaly Yefimov (born 1940)	8 September 1990	10 January 1996	5 years, 124 days	Independent	Silayev I Silayev II; Yeltsin—Gaidar; Chernomyrdin I
2	Nikolai Tsakh [ru]	Nikolai Tsakh (born 1939)	12 January 1996	28 February 1998	2 years, 47 days	Independent	Chernomyrdin I – II
3	Sergey Frank	Sergey Frank (born 1960)	28 February 1998	9 March 2004	6 years, 10 days	Independent	Chernomyrdin II; Kiriyenko; Primakov; Stepashin; Putin I Kasyanov
4	Igor Levitin	Igor Levitin (born 1952)	9 March 2004	21 May 2012	8 years, 73 days	United Russia	Fradkov I – II; Zubkov; Putin II
5	Maksim Sokolov	Maksim Sokolov (born 1968)	21 May 2012	18 May 2018	5 years, 362 days	United Russia	Medvedev I
6	Yevgeny Dietrich	Yevgeny Dietrich (born 1973)	18 May 2018	9 November 2020	2 years, 175 days	United Russia	Medvedev II; Mishustin I
7	Vitaly Savelyev	Vitaly Savelyev (born 1954)	10 November 2020	14 May 2024	3 years, 186 days	United Russia	Mishustin I
8	Roman Starovoyt	Roman Starovoyt (1972–2025)	14 May 2024	7 July 2025	1 year, 54 days	United Russia	Mishustin II
8	Andrey Nikitin	Andrey Nikitin (born 1979)	7 July 2025	Incumbent	1 year, 13 days	United Russia	Mishustin II
