= Corps of Mining Engineers =

Militarized organization in Imperial Russia

The Corps of Mining Engineers was a militarized organization founded in Imperial Russia on 1 January 1834 to manage mining and oil extraction.

Yegor Kankrin, the Minister of Finance was the first head of the organization, with Major General Konstantin Chevkin acting as Chief of staff. Russian geologist Ernst Reinhold von Hofmann was involved with the corps.
