= Alexey Bakulin =

Soviet politician

Alexey Venediktovich Bakulin
- Алексей Венедиктович Бакулин
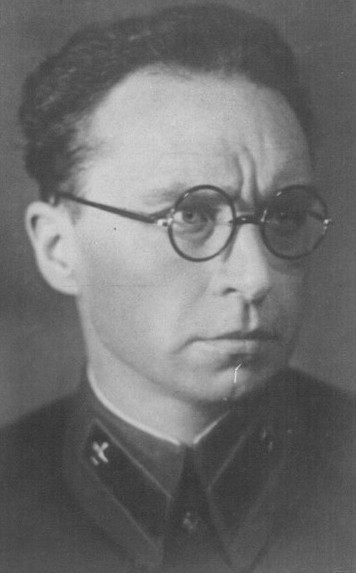

6th People's Commissar of Communication Routes of the Soviet Union
- In office August 22, 1937 – April 5, 1938
- Prime Minister: Vyacheslav Molotov
- Preceded by: Lazar Kaganovich
- Succeeded by: Lazar Kaganovich

Personal details
- Born: March 22, 1899 Saint Petersburg
- Died: March 7, 1939 (aged 39) Moscow
- Resting place: Donskoye Cemetery
- Party: Russian Communist Party (Bolsheviks) since 1918
- Education: Frunze Military Academy
- Awards: Order of Lenin

Alexey Venediktovich Bakulin (Russian: Алексе́й Венеди́ктович Баку́лин; March 22, 1899 – March 7, 1939) was a Soviet party and state leader, serving as People's Commissar of Communication Routes of the Soviet Union and as Deputy of the First Convocation of the Supreme Soviet of the Soviet Union.

== Biography ==
Alexey Venediktovich Bakulin was born on March 22, 1899, in Saint Petersburg, where his father did military service. He was of Russian ethnicity. After his father was fired, the family returned to their places of origin in Miass.

In 1916 he graduated from the Miass Higher Primary Urban School, after which he worked at a local factory as a draftsman-copymaker and assistant locksmith. From October 1916 he was an instructor of the All-Russian Zemsky Census in the Orenburg Governorate. In February 1918, he joined the Bolsheviks and in March of the same year became the editor of the newspaper Izvestia of the city of Miass Zavod.

In May 1918, Bakulin joined the Red Army and from June served as commissar and adjutant in various parts of the Urals, and beginning in September, as inspector for the grain monopoly of the 3rd Army. In the same year he was appointed to the post of military commissar of artillery of the 30th Rifle Division. In 1920 he joined the political department of the 2nd Irkutsk Division and was appointed to the post of military commissar-chief of the political department of the 1st Trans-Baikal Division. In 1921 he was appointed to the post of chief of Political Administration of the Amur and Far Eastern fronts. At the same time, he was elected a member of the Constituent Assembly of the Far Eastern Republic and took part in hostilities against the troops under the command of ataman Semyonov and Baron Ungern.

From 1922 he served as head of the agitation department and military commissar of the 10th Cavalry Division and head of the Central Omsk Club of the RKKA commanders, and beginning in 1923 as Deputy Head of the Political Department of the 35th Infantry Division, and then Head of the Political Department of the 6th Altai Cavalry Brigade.

In the fall of 1924, Bakulin was sent to study at the Higher Military-Political Academic Courses named after Nikolay Tolmachyov, after which in May 1925 he was at the disposal of the intelligence department of the Red Army headquarters, and then sent to China, where he served as military adviser, in the Central Group of Soviet Military advisers, and also taught in a special school, where he trained personnel for the Chinese army. From 1926 to 1927, he served as Vice-Consul of the Consulate General of the Soviet Union in Hankow.

From June 1929, he completed an internship in the army as an exploration assistant to the chief of the operational unit of the headquarters of the 35th Infantry Division, then was at the disposal of the Red Army Headquarters Intelligence Directorate and in January 1930 was sent to China as a consul.

In July 1931, he was appointed assistant to the 2nd Eastern Division of the People's Commissariat of Foreign Affairs of the Soviet Union, and then to the position of assistant manager of the organizational and distribution department of the Central Committee of the All-Union Communist Party (Bolsheviks). In September 1933, Bakulin was transferred to the office of the People's Commissariat of Communication Routes, where he was appointed deputy chief of the political department of the Transcaucasus Railway, then in 1934 reassigned to the post of assistant to the political department of the People's Commissariat of Communications on personnel, and in the same year made head of the transport department of the Central Committee of the All-Union Communist Party (Bolsheviks). In 1935 he became head of the political department of the Moscow–Kazan Railway, followed in 1936 by appointment as head of the Lenin Railway, and in July 1937 to the post of deputy People's Commissar of Communication Routes of the Soviet Union in political affairs.

On August 22, 1937, Bakulin was appointed to the post of People's Commissar of Communication Routes of the Soviet Union, but on April 5, 1938, he was removed from his post as unfit to do his job, and on July 23, 1938, he was arrested.

On March 7, 1939, Bakulin was convicted of espionage, participating in a counter-revolutionary organization, preparing a terrorist act, and sentenced to capital punishment by the Military Collegium of the Supreme Court of the Soviet Union. He was shot the same day. He was posthumously rehabilitated on August 25, 1956.

== Awards ==
- Order of Lenin (April 4, 1936)
