= Konstantin Chevkin =

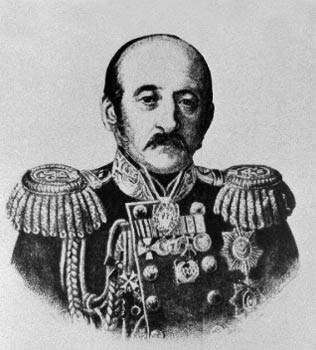
Konstantin Vladimirovitch Chevkin

Konstantin Vladimirovitch Chevkin (1802–1875) was Minister of Transport in Imperial Russia (1855–1862).

Chevkin served in the Imperial Russian Army fighting in the Russo-Persian War (1826–1828) and Russo-Turkish War (1828–1829). He also participated in the defeat of the Polish November Uprising. He then was sent on diplomatic missions to France and Germany.

Reaching the rank of Major General, Chevkin was appointed Chief of Staff of the Corps of Mining Engineers in 1834. We also had visited England and other parts of Western Europe to study the development of railways before joining Lieutenant-Colonel Pavel Petrovich Melnikov and Colonel N. O. Kraft in Alexander von Benckendorff's Commission looking into the viability of establishing the Moscow – Saint Petersburg Railway.

Chevkinite-(Ce) is a mineral which was named after Konstantin Chevkin.

Political offices
Preceded by Pyotr Kleinmichel	Minister of Transport (Russia); 1855–1862	Succeeded by Pavel Petrovich Melnikov
