= Defence Council =

Defence Council or Defense Council may refer to:

- Croatian Defence Council, the main military formation of the Croats during the Bosnian War charged with achieving military objectives
- Defence Council of the United Kingdom, the body legally entrusted with the defence of the United Kingdom and its overseas territories
- Provisional National Defence Council, the Ghanaian government after the People's National Party's elected government was overthrown in the previous election
- Defense Council of the Supreme Soviet of the Soviet Union, officially a state organ of the Soviet Union it functioned informally as a body subordinate to the CPSU Politburo

== See also ==
- Defence counsel, a legal advocate for the defence in civil and criminal proceedings
- National security council
