= People's Commissariat of Communication Routes of the Soviet Union =

Soviet Ministry of Railways in 1923–1946

- Народный комиссариат путей сообщения Советского Союза
- All ministry seals of the Soviet Union used the USSR coat of arms

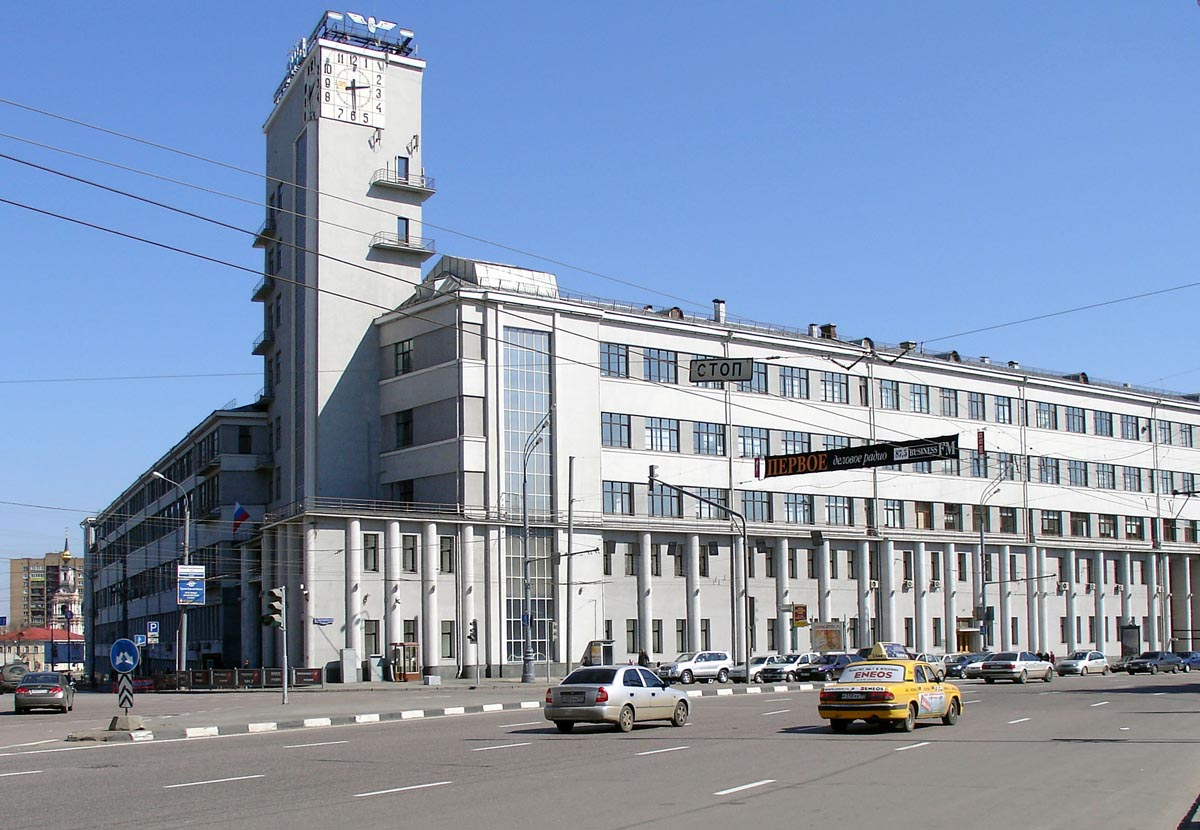
- Building of the People's Commissariat of Communication Routes, 1934, architect Ivan Fomin

Agency overview
- Formed: 1923
- Preceding agency: People's Commissariat of Communication Routes of the Russian Socialist Federative Soviet Republic
- Dissolved: 1946
- Superseding agency: Ministry of Railways of the Soviet Union
- Jurisdiction: Soviet Union
- Parent department: Council of People's Commissars of the Soviet Union

The People's Commissariat of Communication Routes of the Soviet Union was the state body of the Soviet Union, which controlled the activities of the railway and other types of transport of the Soviet Union in 1923–1946.

== History ==
In 1923, after the formation of the Soviet Union, the People's Commissariat of Communication Routes of the Russian Socialist Federative Soviet Republic was transformed into the All–Union People's Commissariat of Communication Routes of the Soviet Union. Felix Dzerzhinsky, Chairman of the All–Russian Emergency Commission, became its first head (People's Commissar).

Before leaving the People's Commissariat of Communication Routes to the post of Chairman of the Supreme Council of the National Economy, Felix Dzerzhinsky in January 1924 submitted to the Council of Labor and Defense of the Soviet Union a detailed "Report on the State Merchant Marine". It analyzed the work of the Soviet navy, outlined the draft shipbuilding program for 10 years drawn up by the Central Maritime Transport Administration and the State Merchant Marine fleet, and proposed a small number of ships to be purchased abroad as a temporary measure.

On 2 March 1929, the Institute of Shipbuilding and Ship Repair was established as part of the Research Department of the People's Commissariat of Communication Routes, headed by Professor (later Academician) Valentin Pozdunin.

On 13 February 1930, the Presidium of the Central Executive Committee of the Soviet Union approved the resolution of the Council of People's Commissars "On the reorganization of the management of sea and river transport".

In the fall of 1930, the Institute of Shipbuilding and Ship Repair was transformed into the Central Research Institute of Maritime Transport (the first director was Sergeev). A year after the merger with a similar river transport institute, the Central Scientific Research Institute of Water Transport was established with a seat in Leningrad (the first director was Tolstousov) and a branch in Moscow. The institute carried out research in the field of economics and fleet operation, ship repair, capital construction and use of waterways and ports.

On 30 January 1931, the Central Executive Committee and the Council of People's Commissars of the Soviet Union adopted a decree "On the formation of the People’s Commissariat for Water Transport of the Soviet Union", on the basis of which sea and river transport and all port facilities were separated from the People's Commissariat of Communication Routes.

In 1931 and 1932, the Council of People's Commissars of the Soviet Union adopted a number of decrees aimed at intensifying transportation and improving the work of rail and road transport.

In 1932, the decision of the Council of People's Commissars on the reconstruction of railways was made. This decision envisaged: strengthening the track by laying heavier rails, wide use of rubble ballast, creating powerful locomotives (Felix Dzerzhinsky, Joseph Stalin), heavy 4-axle cars, switching rolling stock to automatic brakes and automatic coupling, creating semi-automatic and automatic locking systems, introducing mechanical and electrical interlocking arrows and signals and more.

In 1940, the operational length of the network reached 106.1 thousand kilometers, the transportation of goods amounted to 592.6 million tons.

During World War II, the European part of the railway network was almost completely destroyed, 40% of cars and 50% of locomotives were lost. Despite this, the railway transport fully provided military transportation and cargo delivery to the front.

In 1946, the People's Commissariat of Communication Routes of the Soviet Union was transformed into the Ministry of Railways of the Soviet Union.

== People's Commissars of Communication Routes of the Soviet Union ==
People's Commissars	Term of office
Felix Dzerzhinsky	6 July 1923 – 2 February 1924
Jan Rudzutak	2 February 1924 – 11 June 1930
Moisey Rukhimovich	11 June 1930 – 2 October 1931
Andrey Andreyev	2 October 1931 – 28 February 1935
Lazar Kaganovich	28 February 1935 – 22 August 1937
Alexey Bakulin	22 August 1937 – 5 April 1938
Lazar Kaganovich	5 April 1938 – 25 March 1942
Andrey Khrulev	25 March 1942 – 26 February 1943
Lazar Kaganovich	26 February 1943 – 20 December 1944
Ivan Kovalev	20 December 1944 – 15 March 1946

== See also ==
- Ministry of Railways

== Activities of the People's Commissariat of Communication Routes of the Soviet Union ==
During the First World War and the Civil War, more than 60% of the network, 90% of the locomotive and 80% of the car fleet were destroyed. Only by 1928 was it possible to basically restore the destroyed railway transport and to bring traffic to the volume of 1913.

== Sources ==
- Under the General Editorship of Timofey Guzhenko (1984). Sea Transport of the Soviet Union (to the 60th Anniversary of the Industry). Moscow: Transport.
