= Hermann von Paucker =

Russian general (1822–1889)

- Герман Егорович Паукер
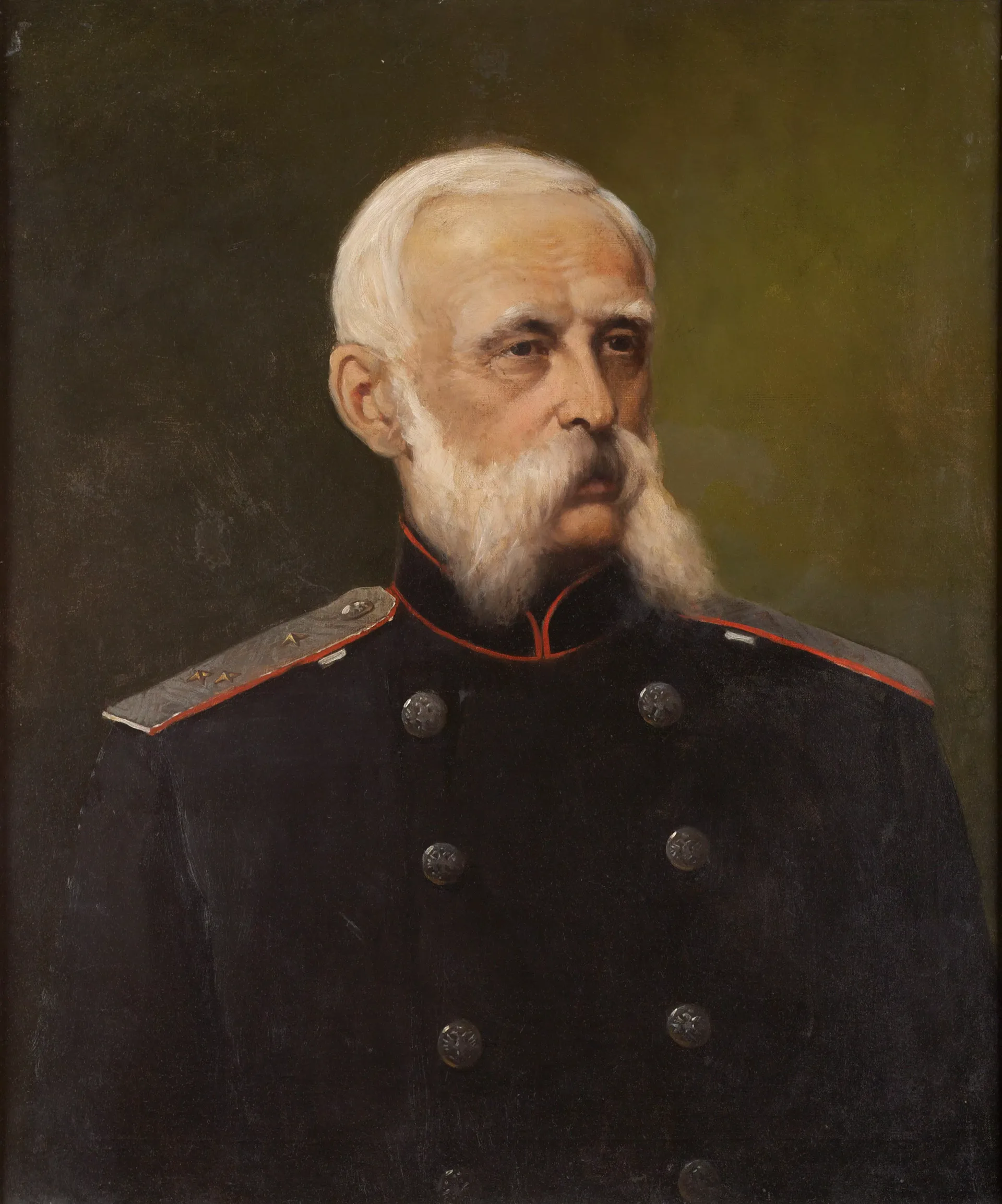
- Portrait, 1883

12th Minister of Railways
- In office 1888–1889
- Monarch: Alexander III of Russia
- Preceded by: Konstantin Posyet
- Succeeded by: Adolf von Huebbenet

Member of the State Council
- In office 1888–1889

Member of the Military Council
- In office 1882–1889

Personal details
- Born: 12 October 1822 Mitau, Russian Empire
- Died: 29 March 1889 (aged 66) Saint Petersburg, Russian Empire
- Resting place: Smolensky Lutheran Cemetery
- Parent: Magnus Georg Paucker

Military service
- Allegiance: Russian Empire
- Rank: Lieutenant-General

Hermann Julius Georg von Paucker, known in Russian as German Yegorovich Pauker (Russian: Герман Егорович Паукер; 12 October 1822 – 29 March 1889), was a Russian general, statesman and military engineer. He was a professor of the Nikolayev Engineering Academy in Saint Petersburg.

== Biography ==
=== Origin and children ===
Von Paucker came from an educated Baltic-German family that entered the Russian nobility through various posts. His father was Courland's principal teacher, astronomer and mathematician Magnus Georg Paucker (1787–1855) and his mother was Anna von Baggovout (died in 1835). He had two brothers: the classical philologist Karl von Paucker (1820–1883) and the first-rank captain Adolf von Paucker (1824–1875). He himself had no wife and no children.

=== Career ===
Von Paucker studied in Paris between 1847 and 1848. He later studied law at the Saint Petersburg Imperial University. In 1850, he participated in the fortification of Kiev and Bobruisk, and in 1856, he was seconded to General Eduard Totleben and carried out major work to strengthen Kronstadt. He was promoted lieutenant-colonel in 1856 and colonel in 1858. In 1859, Paucker became director general of the Committee for the Supervision of Baltic and Black Sea Fortress. As such, he built the then exemplary land battery on the Kerch Strait. He developed a metallic structure supporting the dome of Tsarkoye Selo. In 1866, he was promoted major general. In 1869, he became a real Councillor of State and in 1875 a private councillor. In 1876, just before the Russo-Turkish war, he was promoted lieutenant general. In 1882 he became a senator and in 1889 a member of the State Council. From 1889 until his death in 1892, he was Minister of Railways of the Empire. In 1889, he was made an honorary member of the French Academy of Sciences.

=== Death ===
On 29 March 1889, von Paucker died of pneumonia at his home less than five months after taking up his post in the ministry and being admitted to the State Council. He was buried in the Smolensky Lutheran Cemetery on April 3 of the same year. In 1891, Viktor Kirpichov published his book, "Mechanics of Structures." Course of the Nikolayev Academy of Engineering" posthumously.

== Honours ==
Russian orders and decorations

- Knight of St. Stanislaus, 1st class, 1868
- Knight of St. Anna, 1st class, 1869
- Knight of St. Vladimir, 2nd class, 1872
- Knight of the White Eagle
- Knight of St. Alexander Nevsky, in Diamonds, 1885

== Sources ==
- "Паукер, Герман Егорович" . Brockhaus and Efron Encyclopedic Dictionary (in Russian). 1906.
