= Bessonovka, Bessonovsky District, Penza Oblast =

Rural locality in Penza Oblast, Russia

Coordinates: 53°18′34″N 45°02′31″E

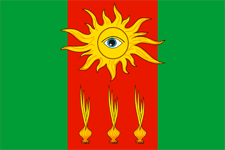
Flag of Bessonovka

Bessonovka (Russian: Бессо́новка) is a rural locality (a selo) and the administrative center of Bessonovsky District, Penza Oblast, Russia. Population: 11,408 (2010 census); 10,012 (2002 census); 9,862 (1989 Soviet census).
