= Aleksey Rogov (politician) =

Aleksey Gavrilovich Rogov
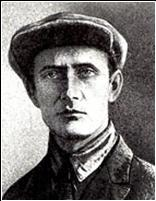

People's Commissar of Communication Routes of the Russian Socialist Federative Soviet Republic
- In office February 24, 1918 – May 9, 1918
- Prime Minister: Vladimir Lenin
- Preceded by: Veniamin Sverdlov
- Succeeded by: Pyotr Kobozev

Member of the All–Russian Central Executive Committee of the Fourth Convocation
- In office 1918–1918

Delegate of the All–Russian Constituent Assembly
- In office November 28, 1917 – January 5, 1918

Member of the Headquarters of the Red Guard of Krasnoyarsk
- In office 1917–1917

Member of the Central Siberian Regional Bureau of the Russian Social Democratic Labor Party (Bolsheviks)
- In office 1917–1917

Personal details
- Born: March 15, 1886 Durasovka, Penza Uezd, Penza Governorate, Russian Empire
- Died: 1950 (aged 63–64) Moskva, Union of Soviet Socialist Republics
- Resting place: Novodeviche Cemetery
- Party: Russian Social Democratic Labor Party (Bolsheviks); All–Union Communist Party (Bolsheviks) (1903–50)
- Education: Parish School
- Profession: Worker (mechanic) revolutionary politician

Aleksey Gavrilovich Rogov (pseudonym Trofim Ryabov; March 15, 1886 – 1950) was a Bolshevik revolutionary and Soviet politician, one of the leaders of the Krasnoyarsk Republic (1905), a delegate to the All–Russian Constituent Assembly and a member of the All–Russian Central Executive Committee, People's Commissar of Communication Routes of the Russian Socialist Federative Soviet Republic (1918).

== Biography ==
=== Early years. Bolshevik locksmith ===
Aleksey Rogov was born on March 15, 1886, in the village of Durasovo, Penza Uezd, province of the same name (or at the South Altay Mine in Tomsk Governorate) in the family of a "proletarian" (miner). At the end of the 1890s, the Rogov Family moved to Krasnoyarsk. Aleksey graduated from a parochial school, after which, together with his father, he went to work at the Main Railway Workshops in Krasnoyarsk.

In November 1902, Rogov was an active participant in the "ticket strike", and in August of the following year he led a three–day strike of student workers (together with Pyotr Roslyakov and V. Stroganov, who were later executed). In 1903–1904, Rogov joined the Russian Social Democratic Labour Party, where he joined the Bolsheviks.

In January 1904 Aleksey Rogov was dismissed from the railway workshops "for unreliability". In search of work he went to Sankt–Peterburg, but returned to Krasnoyarsk in 1905 and got a job as a mechanic in the depot of the local railway station. After this, he was elected a member of the Krasnoyarsk Underground Party Committee of the Russian Social Democratic Labor Party.

=== 1905. Krasnoyarsk Republic. Arrests and escapes ===
In 1905, during the December Armed Uprising of Workers of the Krasnoyarsk Railway Workshops and Depots, nineteen–year–old Rogov became one of the leaders of the uprising. He ended up in the leadership of the Krasnoyarsk Republic, working together with its "president" – warrant officer Andrey Kuzmin.

After the suppression of the Krasnoyarsk Uprising Rogov was imprisoned, but on May 14, 1906, he escaped (together with Aleksandr Melnikov, Innokentiy Vorontsov and some other "prominent figures of the republic") and soon appeared in Baku under the name of Trofim Ryabov. In 1906–1907 he worked in the local "Council of the Unemployed" and in the "Union of Oil Industry Workers". On instructions from the Baku Committee of the Russian Social Democratic Labor Party, he participated in the murder of the manager of the Eastern Society Plant; was arrested in the fall of 1909, but escaped from Baku Prison.

After escaping again, Rogov again found himself in the Far East, where he became a member of the Harbin Committee of the Russian Social Democratic Labour Party. In 1909, Rogov came to Krasnoyarsk illegally to conduct revolutionary work. Here he worked as a machinist at the Bekker Brick Factory and actively participated in the activities of the Krasnoyarsk Party Organization.

In June 1911, Aleksey Rogov organised a strike of workers at a brick factory and builders of a military town: this strike "ended in victory". But its organizer was arrested, identified, and on February 18, 1912, he was sentenced to eight years of hard labor (under Article 102 of the Criminal Code), which he served in the Aleksandrovskoe Central Prison, known for its cruelty, near Irkutsk.

=== 1917. Constituent Assembly and All–Russian Central Executive Committee ===
In 1917, after the February Revolution, Aleksey Gavrilovich, who was amnestied on March 6, came to Krasnoyarsk again: on March 19 he and former "president" Andrey Kuzmin arrived by morning train. Almost immediately, Rogov was elected one of the leaders of the Krasnoyarsk Bolshevik Organization and a member of the Central Siberian Regional Bureau of the Central Committee of the Russian Social Democratic Labor Party (Central Siberian Regional Bureau of the Russian Social Democratic Labor Party (Bolsheviks)). In addition, he became a member of the Krasnoyarsk Headquarters of the Red Guard.

During the October Revolution, Rogov was in Tomsk and "rushed from meeting to meeting, calling on the workers to seize power in the city".

At the end of 1917, Rogov was elected as a delegate to the All–Russian Constituent Assembly from the Enisey District on List No. 2 (Bolsheviks). Arriving in the capital, he became a participant in the dispersal meeting of the Assembly on January 5, 1918. In addition, Aleksey Gavrilovich became a member of the All–Russian Central Executive Committee of the Fourth Convocation.

=== People's Commissar and professional union leader ===
In February 1918, Rogov became People's Commissar of Communication Routes of the Russian Socialist Federative Soviet Republic. On March 6–8, he took part in the 7th (Emergency) Congress of the Russian Communist Party (Bolsheviks). In the same period Aleksey Rogov was a delegate of the Extraordinary Railway Congress and a member of the All–Russian Executive Committee of Railway Workers (head – D. I. Zhuk). He also joined the seven–member board of the All–Russian Executive Committee of Railway Workers, created to manage the Department of Communication Routes.

The signature of People's Commissar Rogov is on Decree of the Council of People's Commissars No. 395 "On the Centralization of Management, Protection of Roads and Increasing Their Carrying Capacity" dated March 26, 1918, within the framework of which "the entire complex network of organizations in charge of transport" was simplified, and "unnecessary organizations" were abolished. In addition, the decree envisaged "replacing one type of [locomotive] fuel with another, in view of the possibility of completely stopping the supply of coal from the Donets Basin". This resolution was not easy for Rogov: the decree did not suit the All–Russian Executive Committee of Railway Workers and had already been rejected earlier (March 18); representatives of the railway proletariat invited to the meeting of the Council of People's Commissars sharply criticized the decree, seeing in it "a diminishment of the role of the All–Russian Executive Committee of Railway Workers".

During the Civil War, Aleksey Rogov was on the Southern and Eastern Fronts. After the establishment of Soviet Power in most of the territory of the Russian Socialist Federative Soviet Republic, Rogov was one of the leaders of the Central committee of the Professional Unions of Railway Workers. He then worked for the People's Commissariat of Foreign Trade and the Supreme Council of People's Economy. He was a member of the Society of Political Convicts and Exiled Settlers (Ticket No. 1384).

In 1936, Aleksey Gavrilovich Rogov retired. He died in Moskva in 1950 and was buried at the Novodeviche Cemetery.

A street in the central district of Krasnoyarsk (former 14th Prodolnaya Street) is named after Aleksey Rogov.

Gallery

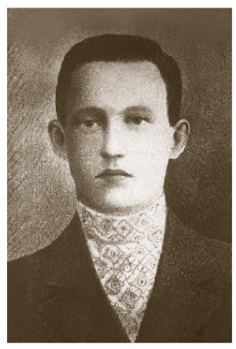
Aleksey Rogov in his youth

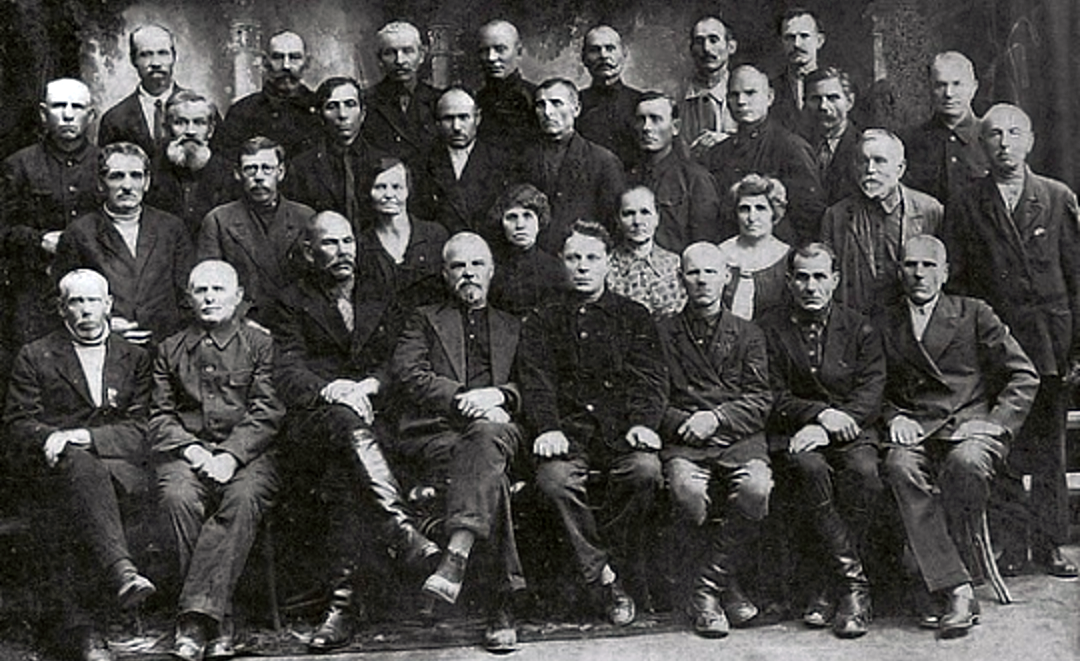
Participants in the December Armed Uprising in Krasnoyarsk (1905)

== Bibliography ==
- Aleksey Rogov (1925). "Memories". PR No. 1. pp. 117–131.
- Aleksey Rogov (1935). "From Memories of the Krasnoyarsk Labor Movement in 1902–1904". 1905 in Sibir. Under the General Editorship of Veniamin Vegman. Novo–Nikolaevsk: Siberian Regional Publishing House.

== Sources ==
- Great October Socialist Revolution: Encyclopedia. Moskva. 1987.
- Lev Protasov (2008). People of the Constituent Assembly: a Portrait in the Interior of the Era. Moskva: Russian Political Encyclopedia.
- State Archive of the Tambov Region. Fund 272. Inventory 1. Case 2231.
- Participants in the Russian Revolutionary Movement of the Era of the Struggle Against Tsarism. Biographical Index. Moskva. 1927.
- Solomon Kipnis (1995). Novodevichiy Memorial. Moskva.
