= Defense Committee (Soviet Union) =

Defense Committee under the Council of People's Commissars of the Soviet Union
- Комитет Обороны при СНК СССР
- All ministry seals of the Soviet Union used the USSR coat of arms

Agency overview
- Formed: April 1937
- Preceding agency: Council of Labor and Defense
- Dissolved: 30 June 1941
- Superseding agency: State Defense Committee
- Jurisdiction: USSR
- Headquarters: Moscow, Russia
- Agency executive: Chairman, Vyacheslav Molotov
- Parent agency: Council of Ministers of the Soviet Union

Defense Committee of the Council of People's Commissars of the Soviet Union (Russian: Комитет обороны при СНК СССР) was a committee subordinated to the Council of People's Commissars of the Soviet Union .

In accordance with a resolution of the Council of Labor and Defense dated 12 February 1927 and a resolution of the Politburo of the Central Committee of the Communist Party of the Soviet Union dated 24 February 1927, the Defense Commission was established and was subordinated to the Council of Labor and Defense. It was again reformed based on a decision of the Council of Labor and Defense issued on 24 December 1930. Its members included chairman (24.12.1930), Vyacheslav Molotov and Members (from 1931): Joseph Stalin, Kliment Voroshilov, Grigoriy Ordzhonikidze and Valerian Kuybyshev.

In April 1937 the Council of Labor and Defense was abolished and the Defense Commission was reformed into the Defense Committee, directly subordinated to the Council of People's Commissars of the USSR with Vyacheslav Molotov retaining the chairmanship. In accordance with the Resolution of the Council of People's Commissars No. 983-372s of June 7, 1940, the apparatus of the Defense Committee was reorganized. On May 30, 1941, it was transformed into the Commission on Military and Naval Affairs under the Bureau of the Council of People's Commissars (Russian: Комиссия по военным и военно-морским делам) (not to be confused with the People's Commissariat for Military and Naval Affairs). A month later, following the German invasion of the Soviet Union in June 1941, the committee was transformed into the State Defense Committee headed by Joseph Stalin.

Throughout its existence it was involved in the development of the military industrial complex.
