= Bessonovsky (rural locality) =

Bessonovsky (Russian: Бессоновский; masculine), Bessonovskaya (Бессоновская; feminine), or Bessonovskoye (Бессоновское; neuter) is the name of several rural localities in Russia:

- Bessonovsky, Oryol Oblast, a settlement in Suryaninsky Selsoviet of Bolkhovsky District of Oryol Oblast
- Bessonovsky, Perm Krai, a cordon in Permsky District of Perm Krai
