= Mikhail Khilkov =

Russian railroad executive (1834–1909)

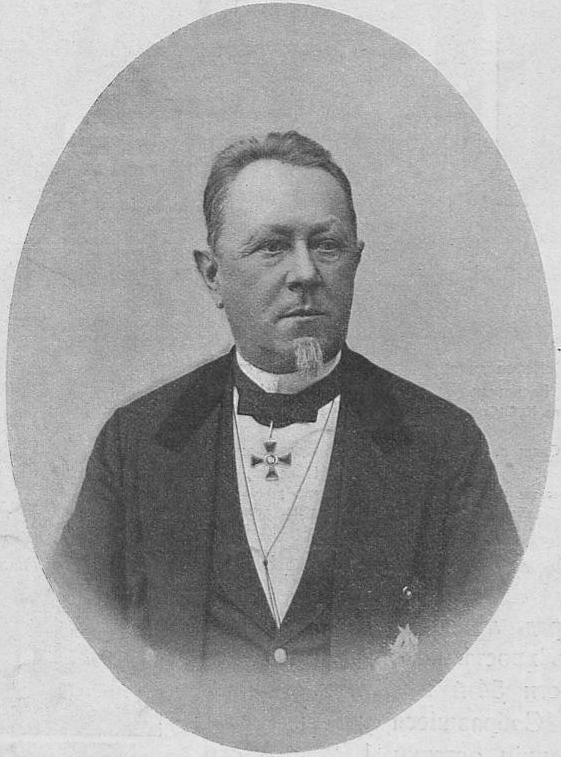
Mikhail Khilkov

Prince Mikhail Ivanovich Khilkov (also spelled Chilkoff, Chilkov, Khilkoff, Hilkof and other variants) (Russian: Михаил Иванович Хилков) (18 December [O.S. 6 December], 1834 - 8 March 1909) was a Russian railroad executive. He was born on the family estate in Sinevo-Dubrovo in Bezhetsky District, Tver Province, Russia. He died in St. Petersburg, and was buried in the village of Gorka in the Sonkovsky District, Tver Province. He served as the Minister of Social Works, Trade and Agriculture of Bulgaria in 1882–1885 and as the Minister of Communications of the Russian Empire in 1895–1905. Khilkov supervised operation of hospital trains during the Russo-Turkish War of 1877–1878, construction of the Trans-Caspian Railway and the Trans-Siberian Railway.

== Career ==
Khilkov hailed from an old princely family. His mother was a close associate of Empress Alexandra Feodorovna. On graduating from the Corps of Pages in 1853, he served in the Semenovsky Regiment until 1857. In 1860 he undertook a 2-year long voyage to Europe and America. According to Witte, after the emancipation reform of 1861 he voluntarily distributed his lands to peasants, which left him "virtually penniless". On his return to Russia he served as a judicial arbitrator, and 2 years later he again went to America, taking a job as a simple workman with the Anglo-American Transatlantic Railroad Company (in North America). In four years Khilkov rose to the position of manager of rolling stock and traction; he then worked for about a year as a metalworker at a locomotive factory in Liverpool; while working there he was offered the position of traction manager on the Kursk-Kiev railway, and from here he went to the Moscow-Ryazan railway. His service there made him a favorite of Empress Maria Feodorovna. According to Sergei Witte, the Empress noted Khilkov for his management of hospital trains during the Russo-Turkish War of 1877–1878 and later she "emphatically supported" Khilkov's appointment as the Minister of Railroads.

In 1880 General Annenkov appointed Khilkov head of the construction of the Kyzyl-Arvat branch railway, but in early 1882 at the invitation of the Bulgarian Government, he became their Minister of Social Works, Trade and Agriculture, and contributed significantly to the country's economic progress. In 1885 Khilkov returned to Russia and again worked on the Transcaspian railway, in 1892 he was appointed by the Government as Director of the Privislyanskaya railway in Russian Poland, and was later in charge of the Samara-Zlatoust (ru), Orenburg, Oryol-Gryazi and Livenskaya Railways; in 1894 he was Chief Railway Inspector.

Councillor of State Prince Mikhail Ivanovich Khilkov was appointed Director of the Ministry of Communications by imperial decree on 4 January 1895, and on 2 April of the same year was confirmed as Minister of Transport and Communications. He was in this Ministerial post during the decisive years of the "Great Siberian Way" construction and also during the Russian-Japanese War. Khilkov delegated relationships with labor to his deputies, who also lacked the will to reform the system. Basic labor and employment standards, discussed since 1902, were not implemented until 1907. Instead of raising wages, Khilkov and his bureaucracy settled for paying only periodic bonuses to a minority of employees.

=== Revolution of 1905 ===
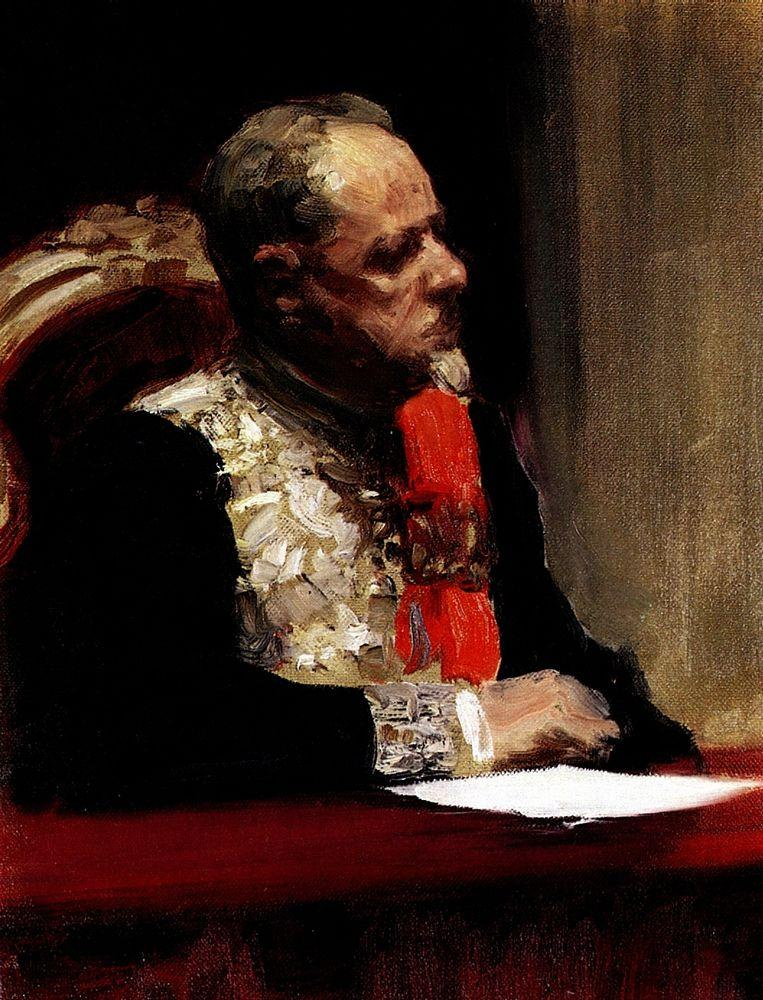
Prince Khilkoff by Ilya Repin

At the outbreak of the Revolution of 1905 the railroadmen appealed to Khilkov peacefully. Khilkov passed these concerns to the tsar and proposed introduction of a very limited workers' representation through elected shop elders. On 8 February 1905 Khilkov decreed nine-hour working day and offered other concessions, although only temporarily. Half-hearted response fell on deaf ears, and the railroad system was paralyzed by a creeping general strike. In March Khilkov held another conference and again offered nothing more than abstract "fair approach" to workers' grievances. On 6 June [O.S. 24 May] 1905 he proposed a creation of a national railroad workers' pension fund managed by elected representatives of regional railroads.

The strikes continued throughout the summer and in October 1905 erupted in a national general strike demanding a democratically elected government. Khilkov tried to mediate the crisis with labor representatives in Moscow, but only enraged them with anecdotes from the past. It turned out that he was unaware, or pretended to be unaware, of the martial law imposed by the Imperial Government upon the railroadmen. He had to return to Saint Petersburg by a horse carriage: his flagship railroad was paralyzed by a strike that he could neither subdue nor appease. Unable to stop the strike, Khilkov resigned on November 7 [O.S. October 25] 1905.

== Honours and awards ==
- Russian Empire: Order of St. Alexander Nevsky
- Russian Empire: Order of St. Vladimir, 2nd class
- Russian Empire: Order of St. Anna, 2nd class
- Russian Empire: Order of Saint Stanislaus, 1st class
- France: Order of the Legion of Honour
- Austria-Hungary: Grand Cross of the Order of the Iron Crown (Austria)
- Japan: Grand Cross of the Order of the Rising Sun
- Kingdom of Greece: Order of the Saviour
- Kingdom of Italy: Grand Cross of the Order of Saints Maurice and Lazarus - July 1902 - during a visit to Russia of King Victor Emmanuel III of Italy
- Honorary citizen of 15 cities

== Sources ==
- Reichman, Henry (1987). Railwaymen and revolution: Russia, 1905. University of California Press. ISBN 0-520-05716-3.
- Witte, Sergei, Sidney Harcave (transl.) (1990). The memoirs of Count Witte. M.E.Sharpe. ISBN 0-87332-571-0.
