= Penzensky Uyezd =

Subdivision of Penza governorate

Penzensky Uyezd (Пензенский уезд) was one of the subdivisions of the Penza Governorate of the Russian Empire. It was situated in the southern part of the governorate. Its administrative centre was Penza. In terms of present-day administrative borders, the territory of Penzensky Uyezd is divided between the Bessonovsky, Kamensky, Kolyshleysky, Mokshansky and Penzensky districts and the city of Penza of Penza Oblast.

== Demographics ==
At the time of the Russian Empire Census of 1897, Penzensky Uyezd had a population of 161,983. Of these, 98.3% spoke Russian, 0.4% Polish, 0.3% Tatar, 0.2% German, 0.2% Yiddish, 0.2% Mordvin, 0.1% Ukrainian and 0.1% Latvian as their native language.
