= Konstantin Posyet =

Russian admiral (1820–1899)

- Константин Посьет
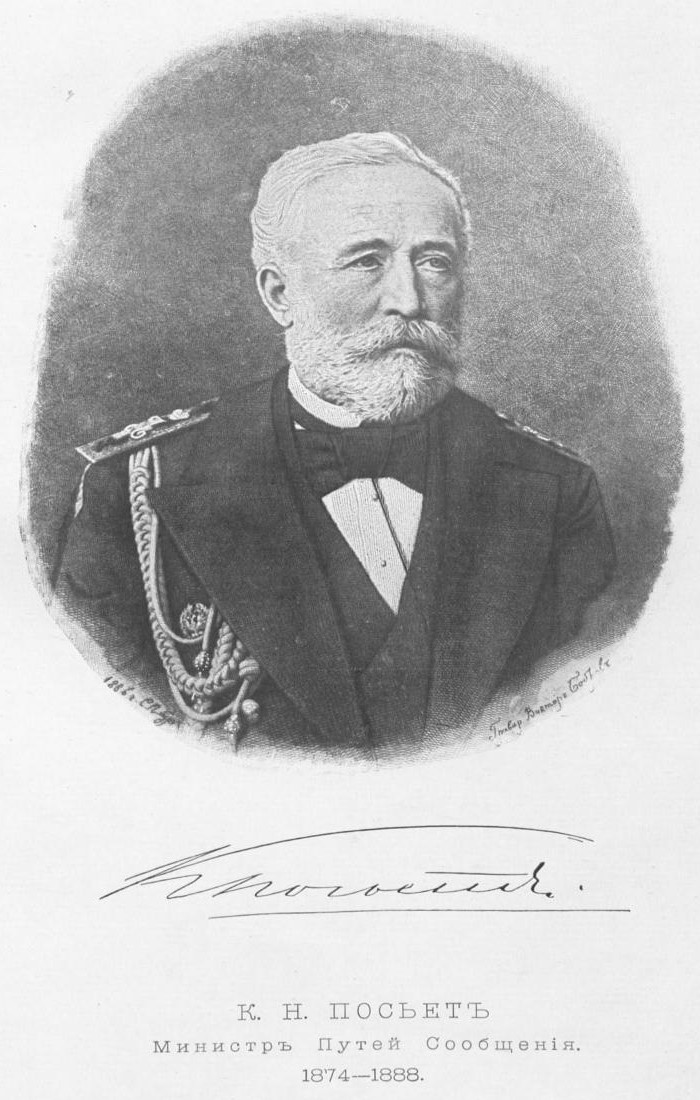

11th Minister of Railways
- In office 1874–1888
- Monarchs: Alexander II; Alexander III
- Preceded by: Alexei Bobrinsky
- Succeeded by: Hermann von Paucker

Personal details
- Born: January 2, 1820 Pernov, Governorate of Livonia, Russian Empire
- Died: May 8, 1899 (aged 79) Saint Petersburg, Russian Empire
- Resting place: Novodevichy Cemetery (Saint Petersburg)
- Relations: Yelena Menshikova; Rosalia-Annette Lang
- Children: none
- Education: Naval Cadet Corps

Military service
- Allegiance: Russia
- Branch/service: Imperial Russian Navy
- Rank: Admiral

Konstantin Nikolayevich Posyet (Russian: Константи́н Никола́евич Посье́т; French: Constantin Possiet; 2 January 1820 [O.S. 21 December 1819] – 8 May [O.S. 26 April] 1899) was a Russian statesman and admiral of French origin, who served as the minister of transport communications between 1874 and 1888.

== Biography ==
Posyet was a descendant of one Possiet de Rossier, a French noble who was commissioned by Peter the Great to lay out vineyards near Astrakhan and Anna Chappuzeau, a descendant of playwright Samuel Chappuzeau, who was also the widow of famous botanist Samuel Gmelin. Konstantin was born in Pärnu, Estonia, a town of which he later became an honorary freeman. After attending the Naval Cadet Corps in St. Petersburg, he pursued the career of a military author. Artillerie-Exercitium (1847), a comprehensive treatise about modern artillery, won him a Demidov Prize from the Russian Academy of Sciences.

In 1852–54, Posyet followed Admiral Yevfimy Putyatin on the frigate Pallas to Japan. Accompanied by novelist Ivan Goncharov and inventor Alexander Mozhaisky, Posyet explored and mapped the northern coastline of the Sea of Japan, including Possiet Bay, which now bears his name. In 1856 he carried to Japan the news of the ratification of the Treaty of Shimoda. Posyet's journeys and published observations made him something of an expert on Japan. Years later, he negotiated with Enomoto Takeaki the Treaty of Saint Petersburg, which brought entire Sakhalin Island into the Russian fold.

Back in the capital by 1858, Posyet was asked to supervise the education of Grand Duke Alexei Alexandrovich of Russia, who was destined for a naval career. In the 1860s, he accompanied Grand Duke on naval excursions to the Mediterranean and the Atlantic Ocean. In 1871-72 they visited the United States, the imperial party comprising, besides Posyet and Grand Duke Alexei, Councilor Machin, Consul Bodisco (who helped negotiate the sale of Alaska in 1867), Count Olsonviev, Dr. Kudrin, and Lieutenants Sterlegov and Sten Carl Tudeer (later governor of Vyborg and a member of the Finnish Senate). Posyet and his pupil inspected the condition of U.S. railroads and inner waterways and met President Ulysses S. Grant, Hamilton Fish and other leading politicians. In Nebraska they witnessed a buffalo hunt and made the acquaintance of Buffalo Bill Cody and leading military figures, including Philip H. Sheridan, George Armstrong Custer and Edward Ord.

Between 1874 and 1888, Posyet served as Minister of Ways and Communications. Inspired by his American experience, he set himself the task of extending Russia's network of state-owned railways and upgrading the obsolete Mariinsky Canal System. He also introduced a system of marine salvage operations. As early as 1875, Posyet came up with a detailed proposal concerning the construction of the Trans-Siberian Railway, but the project had to be abandoned due to the outbreak of the Turkish war.

Posyet's tenure of office was brought to an abrupt end by the Borki train disaster involving royal train of Alexander III. The aged minister was replaced, but remained active in the State Council of Imperial Russia until his death. He was a recipient of numerous Russian and foreign awards, including the Order of the Rising Sun, 1st Class. In 1896, he emerged as a leading advocate for the restoration of the familiar white-blue-red tricolor as the official flag of Russia. Posyet bequeathed his extensive library and collections to the Kunstkamera in St. Petersburg. His grave is in the Novodevichy Cemetery in St. Petersburg.
