= State Defense Committee =

Powerful body in the Soviet government during World War II

- Государственный комитет обороны
- All ministry seals of the Soviet Union used the USSR coat of arms

Agency overview
- Formed: 30 June 1941
- Preceding agency: Defense Committee
- Dissolved: 4 September 1945
- Jurisdiction: USSR
- Headquarters: Moscow, Russian SFSR
- Agency executives: Joseph Stalin, Chairman; Vyacheslav Molotov, Deputy Chairman
- Parent agency: All-Union Supreme Soviet

The State Defense Committee (Russian: Государственный комитет обороны (ГКО), romanized: Gosudarstvennyĭ komitet oborony (GKO)) was an extraordinary organ of state power in the Soviet Union during World War II with complete state power in the country.

== General scope ==
The Soviets set up the GKO on 30 June 1941, a week after Nazi Germany invaded the Soviet Union on 22 June 1941, by a joint decision of the Presidium of the Supreme Soviet of the Soviet Union, the Council of People's Commissars (Sovnarkom), and the Central Committee of the Communist Party of the Soviet Union. The war situation at the front lines required a more centralized form of government. The Supreme Soviet of the Soviet Union, however, continued unsuspended. On 18 June 1942, over a thousand members attended the 9th session of the Supreme Soviet in Moscow.

Geoffrey Roberts described the GKO as "a sort of war cabinet".

== Composition ==
Portrait	Name (Lifespan)	Term of office			Notes
Portrait	Name (Lifespan)	Took office	Left office	Duration	Notes
	Joseph Stalin (1878–1953)	30 June 1941	4 September 1945	4 years, 66 days	Chairman
	Vyacheslav Molotov (1890–1986)	30 June 1941	4 September 1945	4 years, 66 days	Deputy Chairman until 16 May 1944
	Lavrentiy Beria (1899–1953)	30 June 1941	4 September 1945	4 years, 66 days	Representing State Security; Deputy Chairman from 16 May 1944
	Georgy Malenkov (1901–1988)	30 June 1941	4 September 1945	4 years, 66 days	Representing Aviation Industry
	Kliment Voroshilov (1881–1969)	30 June 1941	22 November 1944	3 years, 145 days	Replaced by Bulganin
	Nikolai Voznesensky (1903–1950)	3 February 1942	4 September 1945	3 years, 213 days	
	Anastas Mikoyan (1895–1978)	3 February 1942	4 September 1945	3 years, 213 days	
	Lazar Kaganovich (1893–1991)	20 February 1942	4 September 1945	3 years, 196 days	
	Nikolai Bulganin (1895–1975)	22 November 1944	4 September 1945	286 days	Replaced Voroshilov

== See also ==
- Council of Labor and Defense

== Bibliography ==
- Barber, John, and Harrison, Mark. (1991). The Soviet Home Front 1941–1945: A Social and Economic History of the USSR in World War II. London: Longman. ISBN 0-582-00964-2, ISBN 0-582-00965-0.
- Werth, Alexander. (1964). Russia at War 1941–1945. New York: Carrol and Graf.
