= Bessonovsky District =

Bessonovsky District Бессоновский район (Russian)
- District
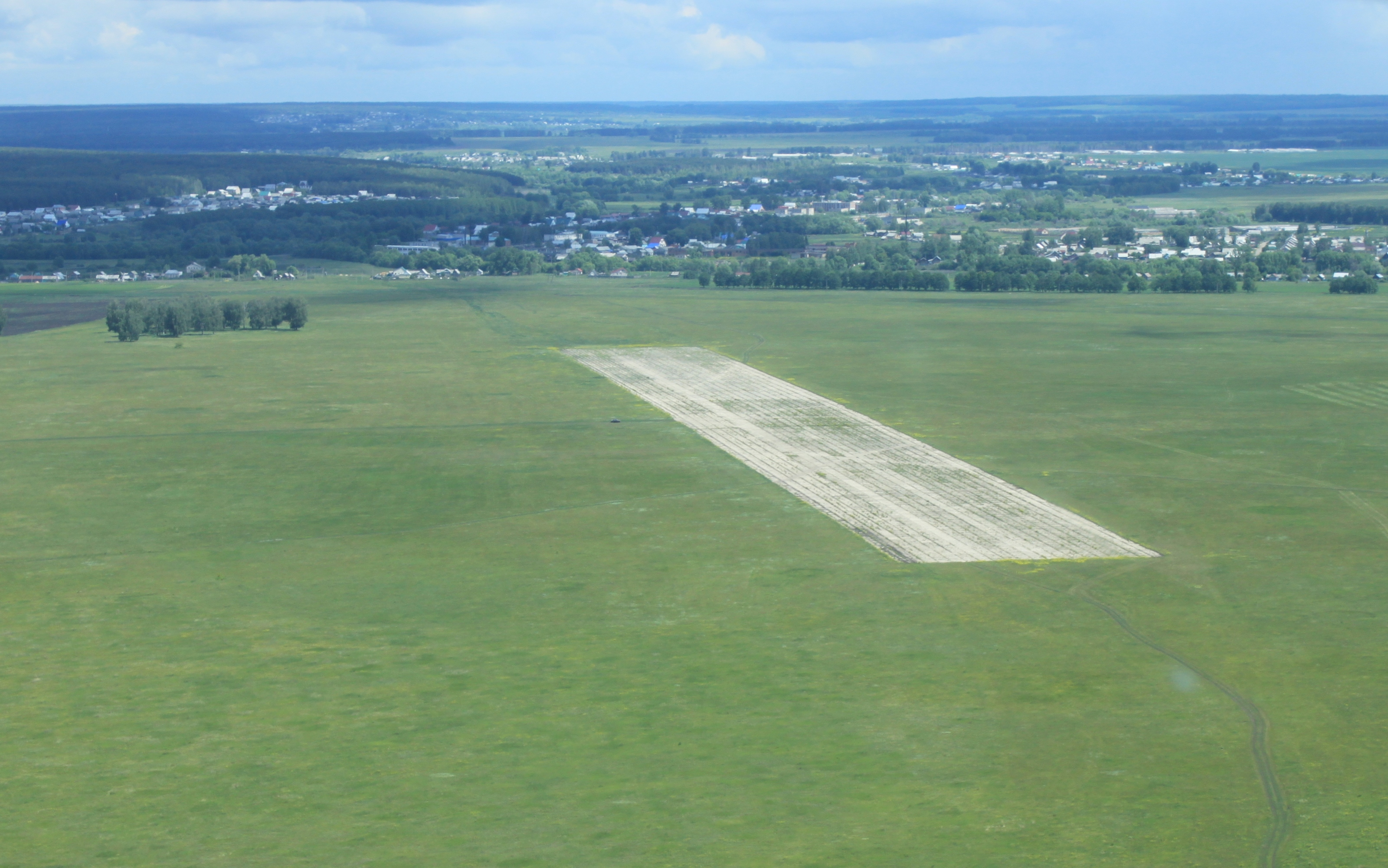
- Runway in Bessonovsky District

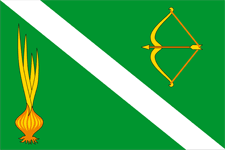
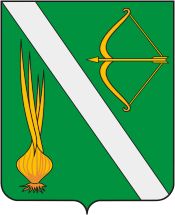
- Flag Coat of arms
- Location of Bessonovsky District in Penza Oblast
- Coordinates: 53°18′30″N 45°02′31″E
- Country: Russia
- Federal subject: Penza Oblast
- Established: 25 January 1935
- Administrative center: Bessonovka

Area
  - Total: 1,249 km^{2} (482 sq mi)

Population (2010 Census)
  - Total: 45,296
  - Density: 36.27/km^{2} (93.93/sq mi)
  - Urban: 0%
  - Rural: 100%

Administrative structure
  - Administrative divisions: 10 selsoviet
  - Inhabited localities: 38 rural localities

Municipal structure
  - Municipally incorporated as: Bessonovsky Municipal District
  - Municipal divisions: 0 urban settlements, 10 rural settlements
- Time zone: UTC+3 (MSK)
- OKTMO ID: 56613000
- Website: http://rbesson.pnzreg.ru/

Bessonovsky District (Russian: Бессо́новский райо́н) is an administrative and municipal district (raion), one of the twenty-seven in Penza Oblast, Russia. It is located in the center of the oblast. The area of the district is 1,249 square kilometers (482 sq mi). Its administrative center is the rural locality (a selo) of Bessonovka. Population: 45,296 (2010 Census); 41,647 (2002 census); 45,515 (1989 Soviet census). The population of Bessonovka accounts for 25.2% of the district's total population.

== Notable residents ==
- Vasily Sergeevich Nemchinov (1894–1964), Soviet economist and mathematician, born in the village of Grabovo
