= Council of Labor and Defense =

Council that coordinated mobilization of the economy and defense industry

- Совет труда и обороны
- All ministry seals of the Soviet Union used the USSR coat of arms

Agency overview
- Formed: April 1920
- Preceding agency: Council of Workers' and Peasants' Defense
- Dissolved: 28 April 1937
- Jurisdiction: USSR
- Headquarters: Moscow, Soviet Union
- Agency executive: Chairman, Chairman of the Council of People's Commissars
- Parent agency: Council of People's Commissars of the USSR
- Child agency: Defense Committee

The Council of Labor and Defense (Russian: Совет труда и обороны, romanized: Sovet truda i oborony) (STO), first established as the Council of Workers' and Peasants' Defense in November 1918, was an agency responsible for the central management of the economy and production of military materiel in the Russian Socialist Federative Soviet Republic and later in the Soviet Union. During the Russian Civil War of 1917–1922 the council served as an emergency "national economic cabinet", issuing emergency decrees in an effort to sustain industrial production for the Red Army amidst economic collapse. In 1920–23 it existed on the rights of the commission of the Russian Sovnarkom and after 1923 of the Soviet Council of People's Commissariats. The Central Executive Committee of the Soviet Union abolished the council on 28 April 1937. Its functions were split between the economic ministries and the Defense Committee under the Council of People's Commissars of the Soviet Union.

The chairperson of the Council ex officio was a chairperson of the Council of People's Commissars. The STO, a commission of the Council of People's Commissars, included among its executive body such top-ranking Bolshevik leaders as V. I. Lenin, Leon Trotsky, and Joseph Stalin, who oversaw a burgeoning professional apparatus. In March 1920 the Council of Workers' and Peasants' Defense became the Council of Labour and Defense. Following the formation of the USSR in 1922 the council was renamed in 1923 as the Council of Labour and Defense of the USSR (Russian: Совет труда и обороны СССР, romanized: Sovyet truda i oborony SSSR); its economic planning and regulatory roles expanded to encompass the entire country. As the first central economic-planning authority in Soviet Russia, the Council of Labor and Defense served as the institutional precursor to the better-known Soviet planning-authority of later years, Gosplan, launched in August 1923 as a subcommittee of STO.

== History ==
=== Economic background ===
The Russian Revolution of 1917 concluded in the fall with the October Revolution, organized and achieved through the direction of V. I. Lenin's radical Bolshevik faction of the Russian Social Democratic Labor Party. With the country already decimated and disorganized by three brutal years of the First World War, the fledgling socialist state struggled to hang on and survive civil war, a multinational foreign military intervention, and the collapse of the economy, including the broad depopulation of major cities and the onset of hyperinflation.

The revolutionary government faced the dual tasks of economic organization and the marshaling of material resources on behalf of its Red Army. A new body known as the Supreme Council of National Economy (Latin acronym of the Cyrillic: VSNKh, commonly sounded out as "Vesenkha") was established on December 15, 1917, as the first governmental entity for the coordination of state finance and economic production and distribution in the Russian Socialist Federative Soviet Republic (RSFSR). Vesenkha was attached to the de facto cabinet of the RSFSR, the Council of People's Commissars, and formally answered to that body.

As the Vesenkha bureaucracy developed, it began to generate specialized departments from itself, entities known as glavki, each responsible for the operation of a specific economic sector. These subordinate entities were known by descriptive syllabic abbreviations, such as for example, Tsentrotextil' for the central department in charge of textile production, and Glavneft and Glavles for the central departments in charge of oil and timber, respectively. These organizations frequently corresponded to economic syndicates established prior to the war and taken over by the pre-revolutionary Tsarist government as part of its coordination of the economy for its own war effort. The personnel employed in these glavki were often the same individuals who served in a similar capacity under the old regime.

Although there were fewer than 500 nationalized companies prior to June 1918, by the end of that month the intensification of the Civil War and worsening economic situation led to adoption of a decree nationalizing all factories of the nation. Goods of all kinds vanished from the marketplace and rationing was extended. Unable to receive fair value for their surplus grain from the state grain-purchasing monopoly, peasants withheld their production from the official market, causing a parallel black market to emerge. The state's prodrazverstka, involving the systemic use of force against the peasantry in order to requisition grain further deepened the crisis. This new centralized and coercive economy, brought about by economic collapse and the exigencies of civil war is remembered to economic historians as Military Communism.

=== Establishment ===
With the civil war drawing to a successful finish, in March 1920 the Council of Workers' and Peasants' Defense was reformed into the Sovet truda i oborony (STO), the Council of Labor and Defense. The organization was formally recognized as being of higher priority than its bureaucratic rival Vesenkha in obtaining allocations of scarce resources. Rather than limiting itself to the industrial production and allocation necessary for the Red Army in wartime, STO took a broader approach to planning than it had in its earlier iteration.

The new name and function of STO was ratified in December 1920 by the 8th All-Russian Congress of Soviets, the formal legislative authority of Soviet Russia. STO was recognized as a commission of the Council of People's Commissars (Sovnarkom), to be headed by the leading People's Commissars themselves, a representative of the Russian trade unions, and the chief of the Central Statistical Agency. STO was directed to establish a single economic plan for Soviet Russia, to direct the work of the individual People's Commissariats toward this plan's fulfillment, and to issue exceptions to the plan as necessary, among other functions. In this way "for the first time the RSFSR had a general planning organ with clearly defined functions," historian E. H. Carr has observed.

During the market-based New Economic Policy (NEP) which followed the wartime economy of Military Communism, STO emerged as an apparatus of administrative control, coordinating the formation of "special unions" of firms in a given branch of industry on the basis of self-financing (khozraschët) and greenlighting the separation of individual firms from centralized trusts on the same basis.

An effort was made in May 1922 to make STO the regulating agency for national trade when Sovnarkom created a new commission attached to STO with the power to issue economic decrees. This commission, which was given a free hand to interpret and modify existing trade regulations and to propose new laws for ratification by Sovnarkom, does not seem to have exerted itself in any substantial way, however, and market forces remained paramount under the NEP.

Despite the real limitations on central planning authority in a largely market-based economy, STO emerged as what historian Maurice Dobb has characterized as "the supreme executive body in the economic sphere, filling the role of an Economic General Staff which Vesenkha had aimed, but had failed, to fulfil in the earlier period."

=== Relationship to Gosplan ===
The State Committee for Planning (Gosudarstvennyi Komitet po Planirovaniiu, commonly called "Gosplan"), later all powerful in the Soviet economic firmament, was launched as a permanent advisory subcommittee of STO, assigned with the task of conducting detailed economic investigations and providing expert recommendations to the decision-making STO.

Throughout the NEP period the economic planning bureaucracy proliferated, with decision-makers of the economic trusts sometimes forced to deal with no fewer than four agencies — the Supreme Soviet of the National Economy (Vesenkha), the People's Commissariat of Finance (Narkomfin), Gosplan, and the Council of Labor and Defense. The system was inefficient and sometimes forced contradictory objectives upon firm managers, forcing the firms to produce reams of documents to satisfy bureaucratic overseers. In the event of fundamental disagreement between agencies, the decision of STO was decisive during the years of the late 1920s.

== Periodicals ==
The Council of Labor and Defense had a daily newspaper, Ekonomicheskaya Zhizn' (Economic Life). The paper was established in November 1918 as the organ of Vesenkha and was made the official voice of STO effective with the issue of August 2, 1921. Effective in January 1935 the paper was made into the official organ of the People's Commissariat of Finance and other institutions. Publication continued through 1937.

== Chairmen ==
- Vladimir Ilyich Lenin (April 1920 – January 1924)
- Lev Borisovich Kamenev (February 1924 – January 1926)
- Alexei Ivanovich Rykov (January 1926 – December 1930)
- Vyacheslav Mikhailovich Molotov (December 1930 – 28 April 1937)

== See also ==
- Gosplan
- State Defense Committee
