= Boris Beshchev =

- Борис Павлович
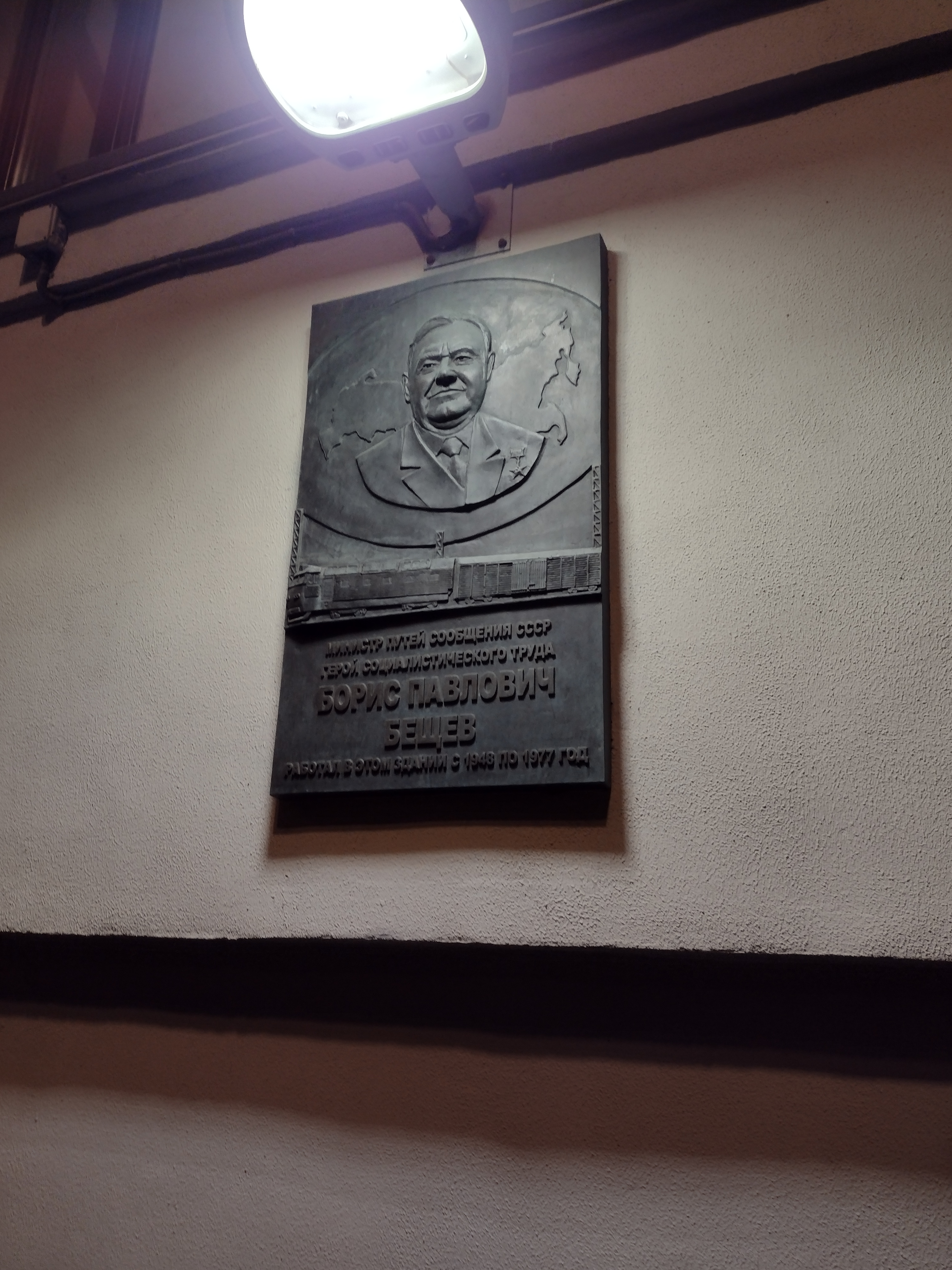

Minister of Communication Routes of the Soviet Union
- In office June 5, 1948 – January 14, 1977
- Preceded by: Ivan Kovalev
- Succeeded by: Ivan G. Pavlovsky

Personal details
- Born: July 16, 1903 Velikoye Yaroslavl, Russian Empire
- Died: May 27, 1981 (aged 77) Moscow, Russia
- Resting place: Novodevichy Cemetery, Moscow

Boris Pavlovich Beshchev was the Minister of Railways of the USSR from 1948-1977.

== See also ==
- Rail transport in the Soviet Union
