= Ministry of Railways (Soviet Union) =

Government ministry of the Soviet Union

Ministry of Railways of the USSR
- Министерство путей сообщения СССР
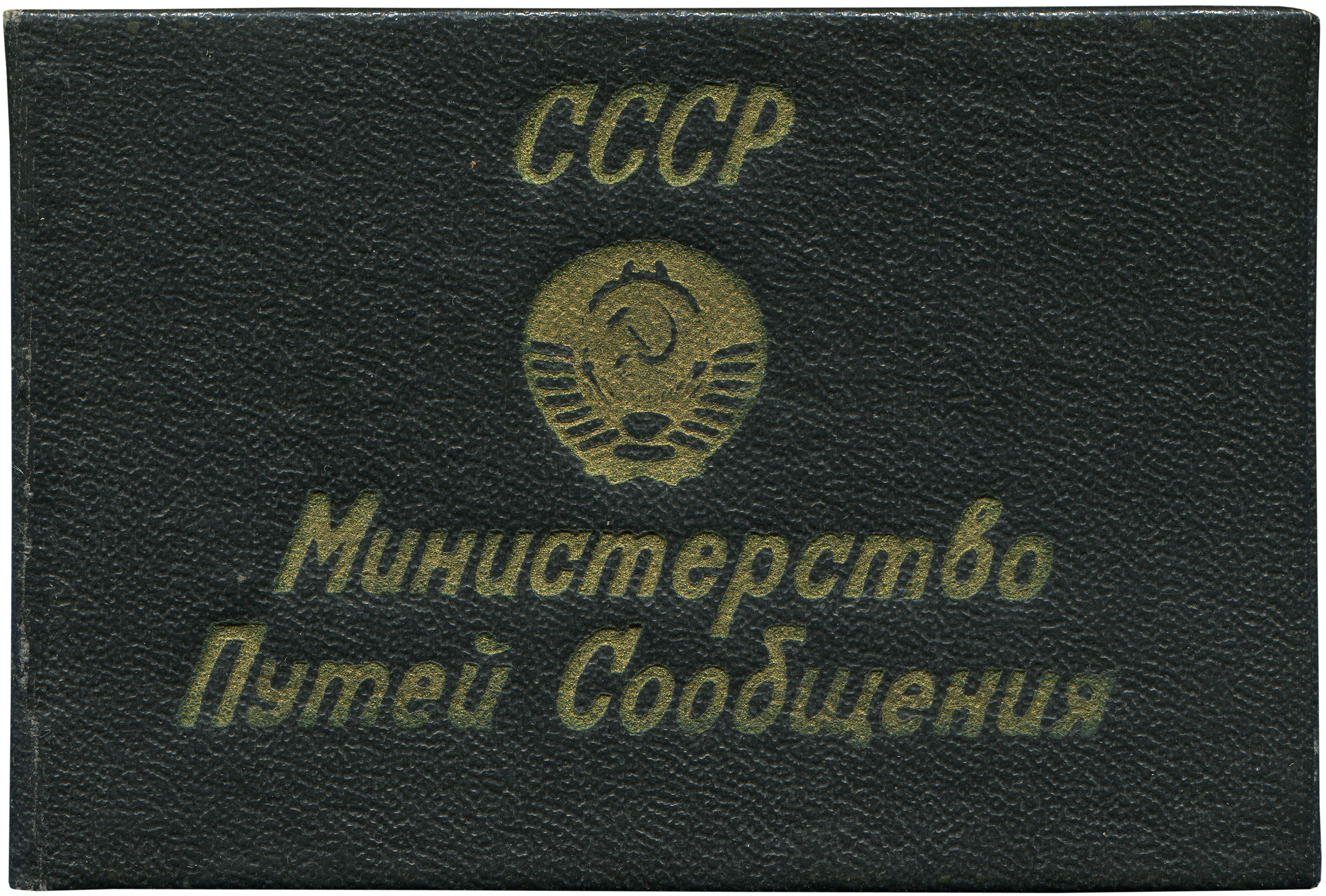

- All ministry seals of the Soviet Union used the Soviet emblem

Agency overview
- Formed: 6 July 1923
- Preceding agency: People's Commissariat of Communication Routes
- Dissolved: 20 January 1992
- Superseding agency: Ministry of Railways of the Russian Federation
- Jurisdiction: Government of the Soviet Union
- Headquarters: Moscow, Russian SFSR, Soviet Union

The Ministry of Railways (Russian: Министерство путей сообщения (МПС) Российской империи/СССР/РФ or Народный комиссариат путей сообщения (НКПС), more correctly translated as Ministry/People's Commisariat of Transportation) oversaw Soviet Railways, which operated the railways of the Soviet Union. It was divided into 32 agencies, which among them had millions of employees. The ministry was responsible for centralized departments (such as electrification), which applied to all subsidiaries.

Before 1946 the ministry was known as the People's Commissariat of Communication Routes, although the term "Ministry of Railways" had been used by the pre-Soviet ministry (founded in 1865).

== Commissars and Ministers ==
The following persons headed the Commissariat/Ministry as commissars (narkoms), ministers, and deputy ministers during the Soviet era:

- Ivan Kovalev (19/3/1946 - 5/6/1948)
- Boris Beshchev (5/6.1948 - 14/1/1977)
- Ivan Pavlovsky (14/1/1977 - 29/11/1982)
- Nikolai Konarev (1/12/1982 - 26/10/1990)
- Leonid Matyukhin (8/5/1991 - 24/8/1991)

== See also ==
- Ministry of Transport (Russia)
- Rail transport in the Soviet Union
