= Ivan Kovalev =

Ivan Kovalev may refer to:

- Ivan Kovalev (cyclist) (born 1986), Russian professional racing cyclist
- Ivan Kovalev (politician) (1901–1993), Soviet statesman and military
