= Rail transport in the Soviet Union =

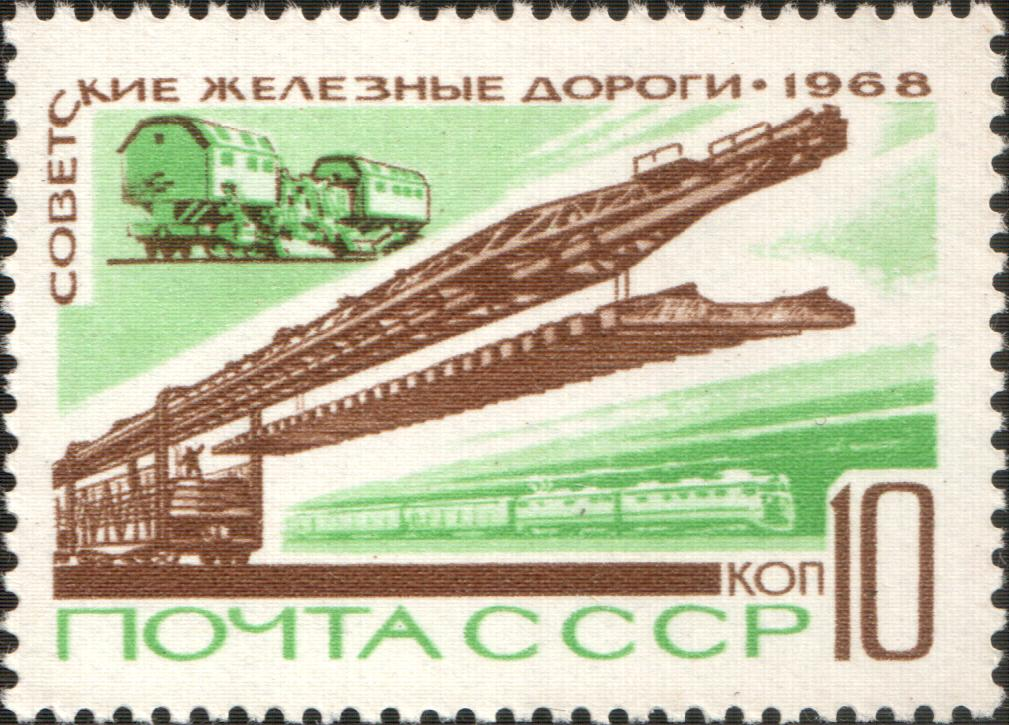
Post stamp "Soviet rail roads", 1968

The Soviet Union was heavily dependent on rail transport, not least during the Russian Civil War and World War II, but also for industrialization according to the five-year plans.

During the Soviet era, freight rail traffic increased 55 times (over that of the Russian Empire just before World War I), passenger traffic increased by almost 10 times and the length of the rail network almost doubled in size in this time as well. The Soviet Union had a railway network of 147,400 kilometres (91,600 mi) (excluding industrial railways), of which 53,900 kilometres (33,500 mi) were electrified.

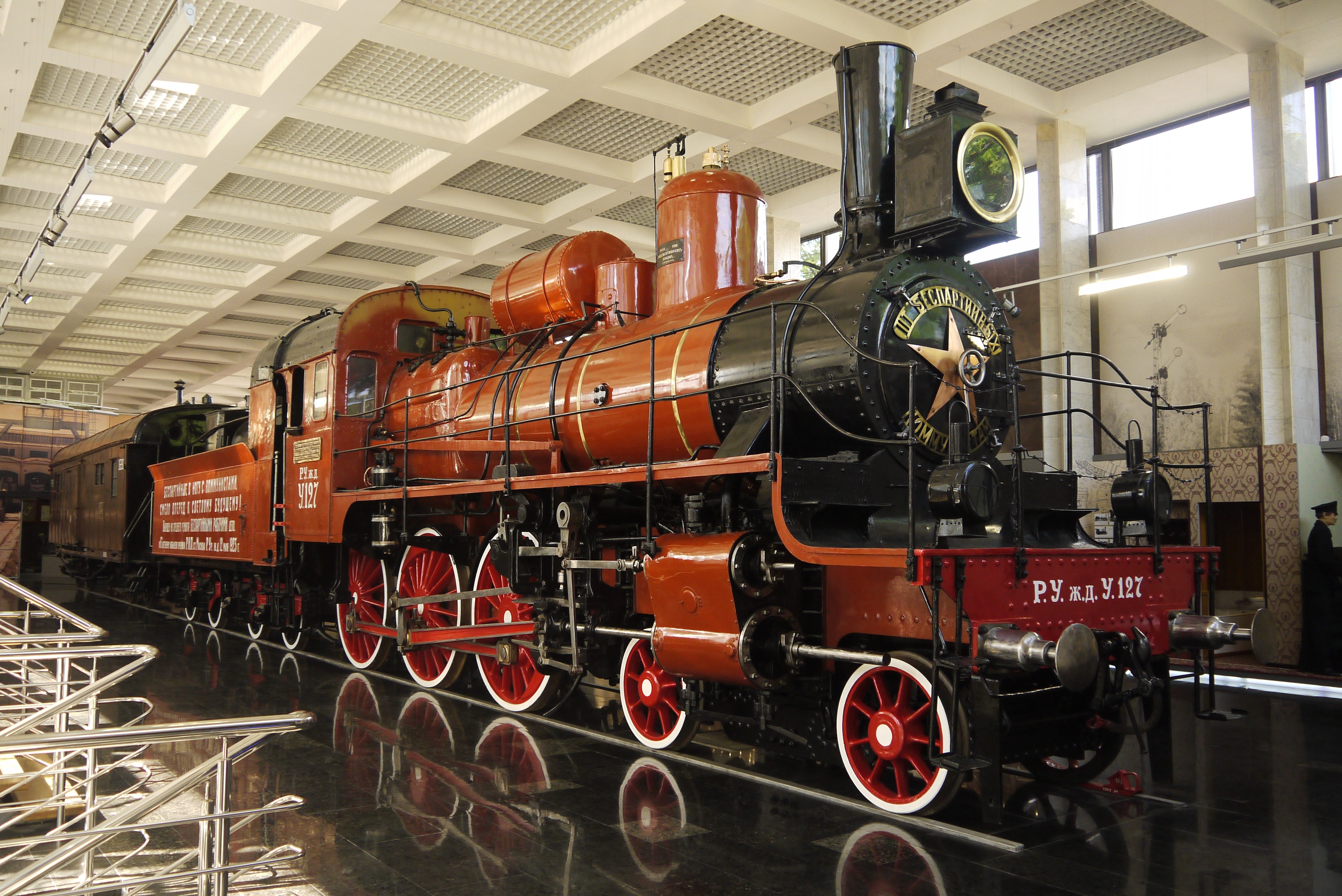
Russian locomotive class U – U-127 Lenin's 4-6-0 oil burning compound locomotive, currently preserved at the Museum of the Moscow Railway at Paveletsky Rail Terminal

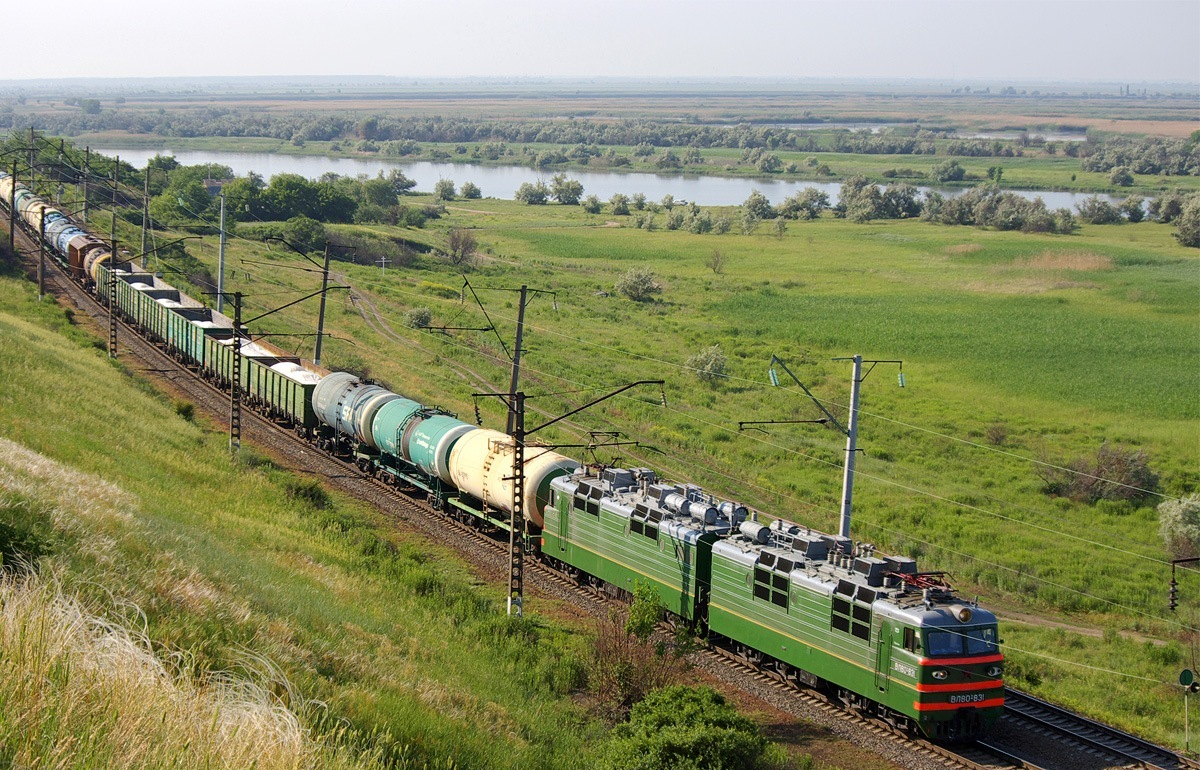
VL80^{T} Electric locomotive hauling freight train

== Pre-war industrialization period, 1928–1942 ==
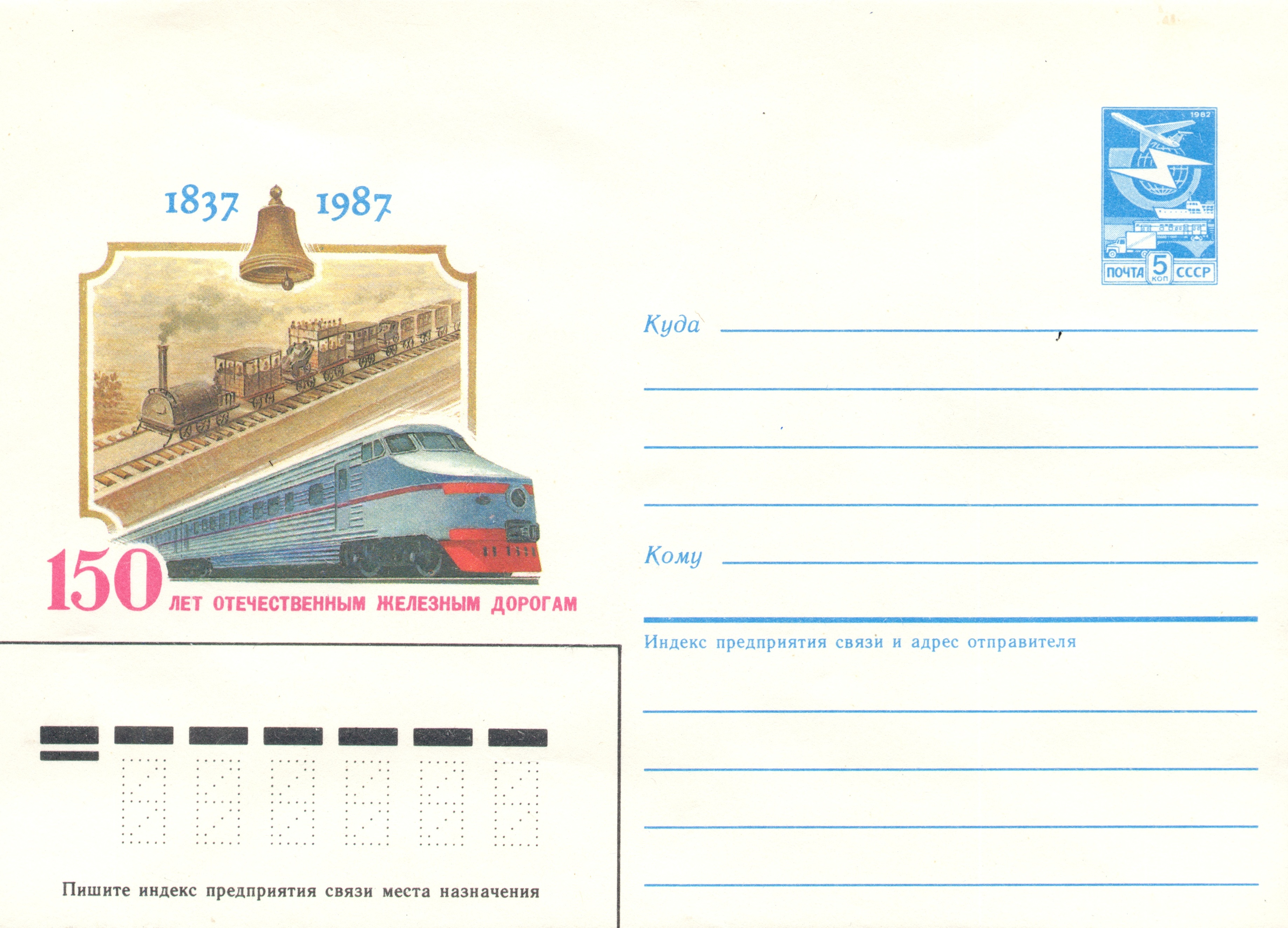
A Soviet postage stamp celebrating the 150th anniversary of the first railways

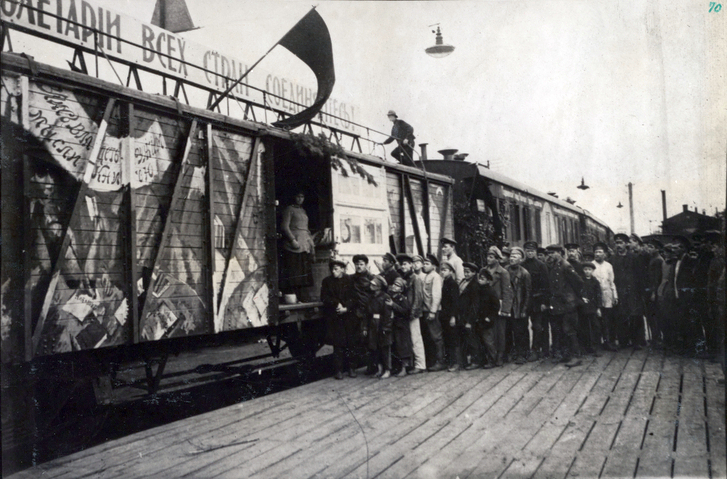
A propaganda train in 1923.

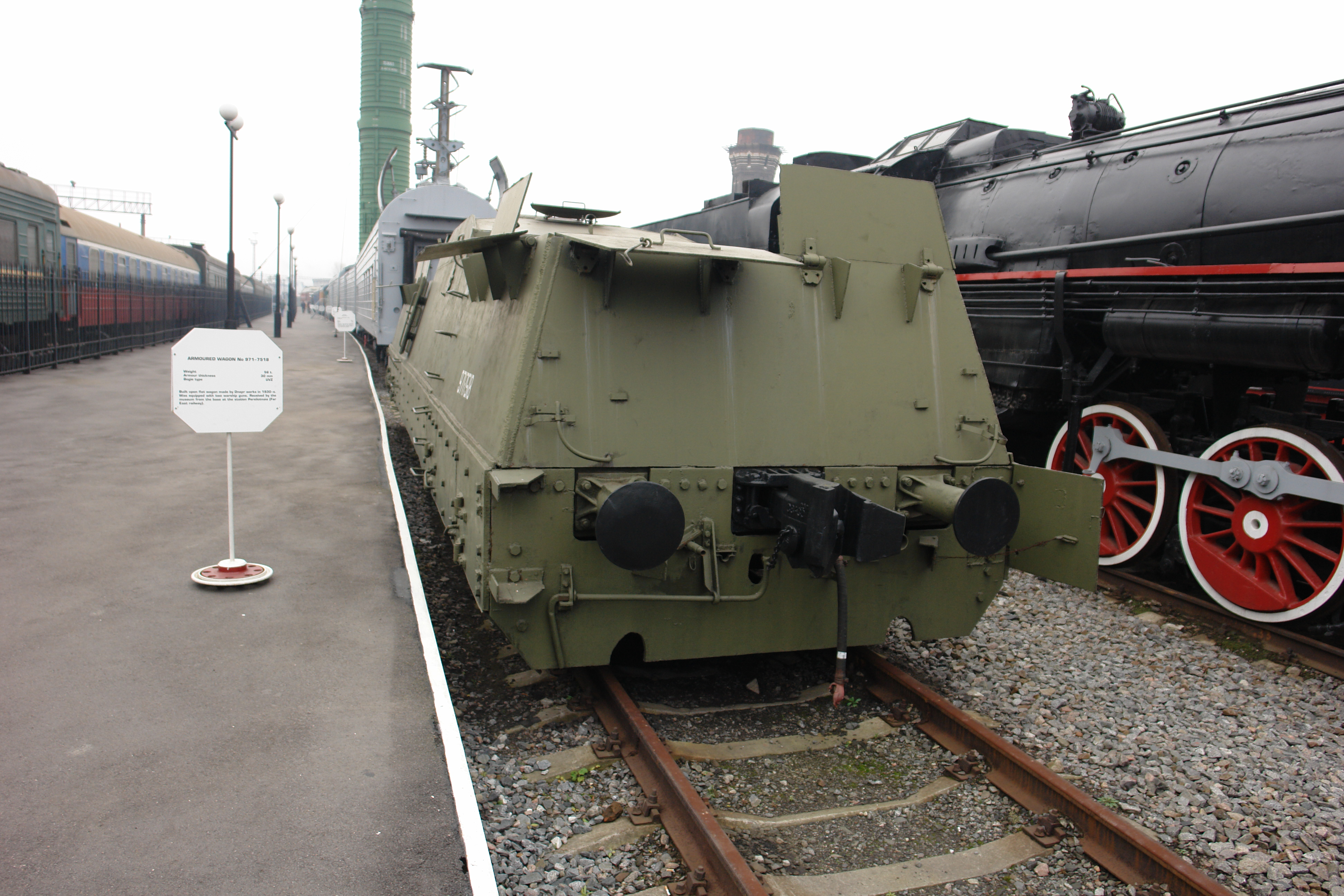
Armoured wagon built during the 1930s.

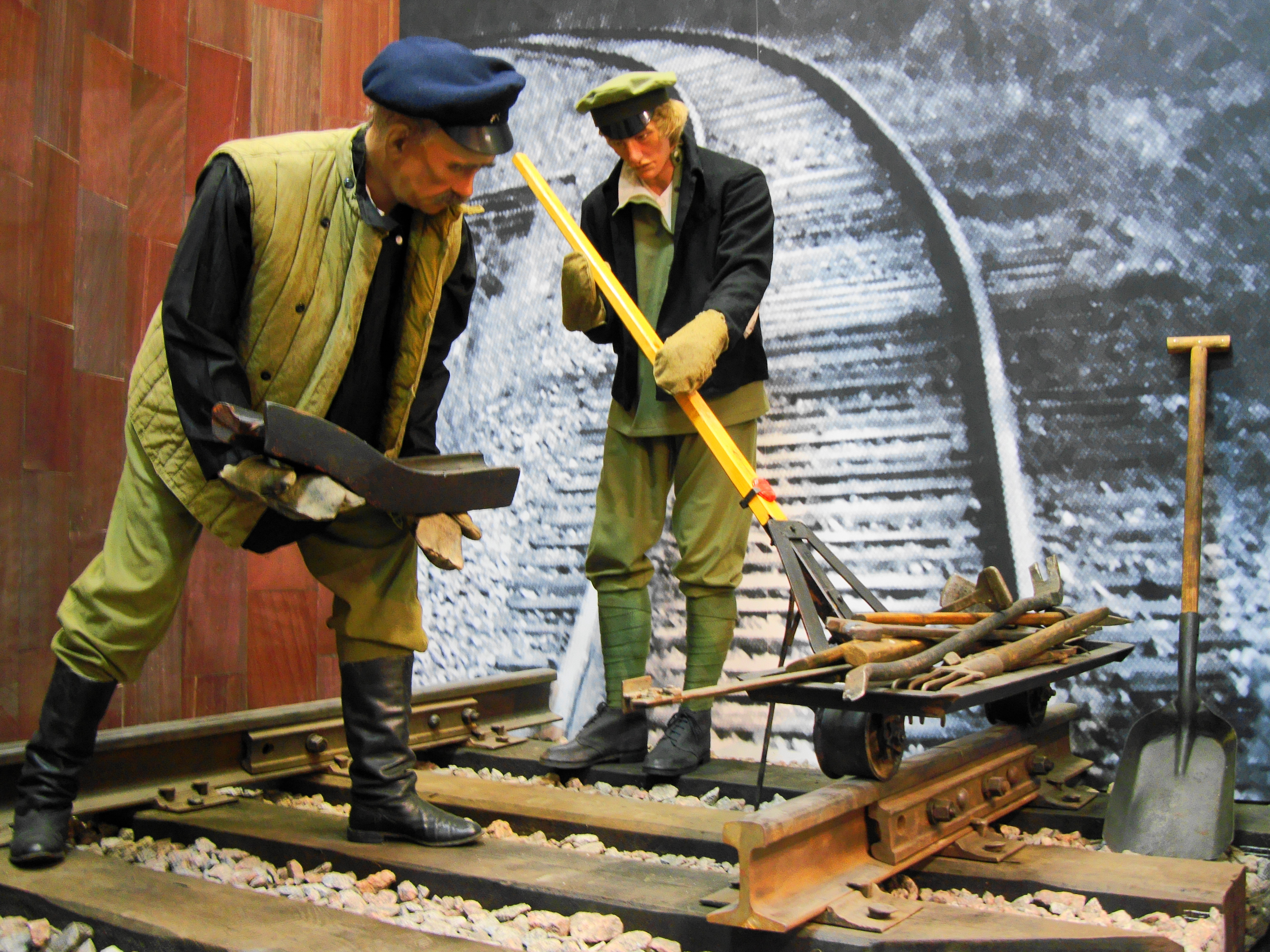
A life size diorama of Soviet track workers repairing railway tracks at the Museum of the Moscow Railway

After the foundation of the Soviet Union the People's Commissariat of Railways (NKPS) (after 1946 renamed the Ministry of Railways (МПС)), the railway network expanded to a total length of 106,100 km by 1940 (vs. 81,000 km in 1917 which was exceeded in length only by the United States). The volume of freight hauled (in tonne-km) increased over fourfold during this period. Railways and control of railways had been a major factor in the Russian Civil War and the Red Army's eventual victory in the conflict. A notable project of the late 1920s, which became one of the centrepieces of the first five-year plan, was the Turkestan–Siberia Railway, linking Western Siberia via Eastern Kazakhstan with Uzbekistan.

In the late 1920s, the young Soviet Union under Joseph Stalin embarked on a programme of rapid industrialization. In a 1931 speech, in which Stalin promoted intensive industrialization, he concluded that "We are fifty or a hundred years behind the advanced countries. We must make good this distance in ten years. Either we do it, or we shall be crushed." But if industrialization generally was to be given first priority, the question arose as to what priority should be given to railway development specifically, keeping in mind that industrialization requires greatly increased rail transportation of goods, e.g. iron ore and coal for steel mills. An example of this was the "Ural-Kuznetsk metallurgical combine" (approved in 1928) where the source of coal was located over 2000 km from the source of iron ore. Not only that, but the steel output had to be transported long distances to its final point of use.

A British railway historian claims that the Soviet objective was to limit investment in railway improvements so that railways could barely meet the new and heavy demands for increased transport placed on them by industrialization, thereby allowing more capital for such industrialization. While there were significant investments made in railways, they were not enough to avoid the failure at times to transport all the goods, especially in early 1931 and 1933. Some of the resulting supply-line crises resulted in production shut-downs. However, in other cases "crisis" was used to describe a situation where the stocks of inputs stored at a plant (such as iron ore at a steel mill) almost ran out due to the railway's failure to deliver on time; no substantial harm would be done to production output, but it would be a close call.

Near the start of first five-year plan of industrialization (1928) there were four main railway decision makers: the government, the party, Gosplan (the Soviet central planning agency), and the railway ministry (known as NKPS). When the NKPS didn't seem to be able to cope with a situation, the party or government would intervene. The majority agreed on increasing investments, but there was no clear consensus on how these investments were to be used. Gosplan advocated the rationalization of the railways, coupled with tariffs based on actual cost, which would reduce traffic demand and provide funds for investment. In 1931, in a Central Committee (CC) resolution proposed recapitalization (replacing all the ties, rails, and renewing the ballast by either cleaning or new ballast) to create some "super mainlines" which would be electrified. This resolution was never adequately carried out, and the actual electrification achieved was only about a tenth of that proposed.

The Central Committee sent Lazar Kaganovich to solve the railway crisis in 1935. Kaganovich first prioritized bottleneck areas over other less-traveled lines; his second priority was investing in heavy traffic lines, and thirdly, other lines (which were also burdened with increased traffic) were left to fend for themselves. Another problem facing rail transport was the massive industrialization efforts pushed on by the authorities. This industrialization placed a heavy burden upon the railways, and Vyacheslav Molotov and Kaganovich even admitted this to the 18th party congress.

=== Modal shares in 1940; rail dominates ===
At the end of the pre-war period in 1940, railroads held an 85% share of freight transport (tonne-km) and a 92% share of intercity passenger transport (passenger-km). For non-rail transport it was: Freight (in tonne-km): river 7%, sea 5%, truck 2%, pipeline under 1%. For passengers: Bus 3.5%, river 3%, sea 1%, air 0.2%. So rail was by far the dominant mode of transportation for both passengers and freight. In the United States in 1940, rail still dominated freight with a 61% share, but only had a 7.5% share of passenger travel, having lost most of this traffic to the automobile.

== Rail traffic in the Soviet Union ==
=== Rail freight traffic in the Soviet Union ===
Railway freight volume in the 20th century: USA and USSR

The graph compares the freight traffic (in tonne-km) of the USSR to the US. The USSR rebuilt its rail system and industrialized with five-year plans. As a result, railway freight grew about 20 times from 20 to 400 billion tonne-km by 1941. But then disaster struck again, World War II began. In the first year or so of the war, traffic plummeted to about half its prewar value. But then the USSR started restoring and constructing railways during wartime so that by the end of the war about half of the lost traffic had been recovered. After the war was over it took a few more years to restore the railways and get back to the pre-war level of traffic.

Then the USSR embarked on a series of more five-year plans, and railway traffic rapidly increased. By 1954 their rail freight traffic (about 850 billion tonne-km) surpassed that of the United States and the USSR then hauled more rail freight than any other country in the world. Railway freight continued to rapidly increase in the USSR so that by 1960 the USSR was hauling about half of all railway freight in the world (in tonne-km) and they did this on a rail system consisting of 10% of the world's railway kilometrage. The status of hauling half the world's railway freight continued for almost thirty years, but in 1988 railway freight traffic peaked at 3852 billion tonne-km (nearly 4 trillion). This rapid growth may seem impressive, but it was also in some senses a failure, since railway traffic at times did not grow fast enough to satisfy demand, partly due to congestion.

In 1991 the Soviet Union fell apart and its largest republic, the Russian Federation, which then hauled about 2/3 of the traffic of the former USSR, became an independent country. For the USSR in 1989, shortly before the collapse of Soviet Union, the railway hauled nearly eight times as much tonne-km of freight by rail as they did by lorry. In 1991 a law was passed which declared that railways were the basic transport system of the USSR.

While highways were more popular in the United States rather than railways, in contrast the Soviet Union had little or no highway system to speak of.

=== Rail passenger traffic in the Soviet Union ===
Railway passenger volume: USA and USSR

This graph compares the volume of rail passenger transportation in the Soviet Union and the United States (United States). Since the Soviet Union was created in late 1922, the curve prior to this is the estimated volume of passenger transport in the "pre-Soviet territory" defined as being within the borders of the Soviet Union of the late 1930s (before the annexations per the secret protocol of the Molotov–Ribbentrop Pact).

In the early years of the 20th century rail dominated passenger transport so the start of this graph implies that there was about twice as much passenger transport in the United States as in the pre-Soviet Russian Empire. But in the early 1920s in the US, the automobile started to provide more passenger transportation than rail. In the US, auto's share rapidly increased so that by the early 1960s auto travel was over 100 times rail passenger travel. Thus one may mentally multiply the US rail curve after the early 1960s by a factor of over 100 to get the total passenger-km in the US. Although Soviet passenger travel by rail became several times that of the US, the total passenger travel in the US was many times larger than for the Soviet Union.

After about 1960, most of the USA rail travel shown in the USA-USSR graph is commuter train travel of (mostly) people going to and from work and not long-distance travel (Amtrak). While air travel in the USA overtook rail travel in the mid 1950s, in the Soviet Union of the late 1980s, rail volume was double that of air travel.

World War II hit both the USA and the USSR in 1941 with opposite results for rail passengers. In the US, gasoline rationing resulted in a surge of rail passengers with almost a third of passenger traffic going by rail. The impact on the USSR was just the opposite. The invasion of Germany deep into the USSR along with German bombing of railroads, took its toll and greatly reduced passenger rail travel.

It was planned in 1990 to increase the passenger-kilometers of travel to 465 billion by 1995 and to 500 billion by 2000, but it didn't happen since the USSR collapsed in 1991.

== World War II ==
During World War II the railway system played a vital role in the war effort transporting military personnel, equipment and freight to the front lines and often evacuating entire factories and towns from European Russia to the Ural region and Siberia. The loss of mining and industrial centers of the western Soviet Union necessitated speedy construction of new railways during the wartime. Particularly notable among them was the railway to the Arctic coal mines of Vorkuta, extended after the war to Labytnangi on the Ob River; construction work to extend it all the way to the Yenisey continued into the 1950s, aborted with the death of Joseph Stalin.

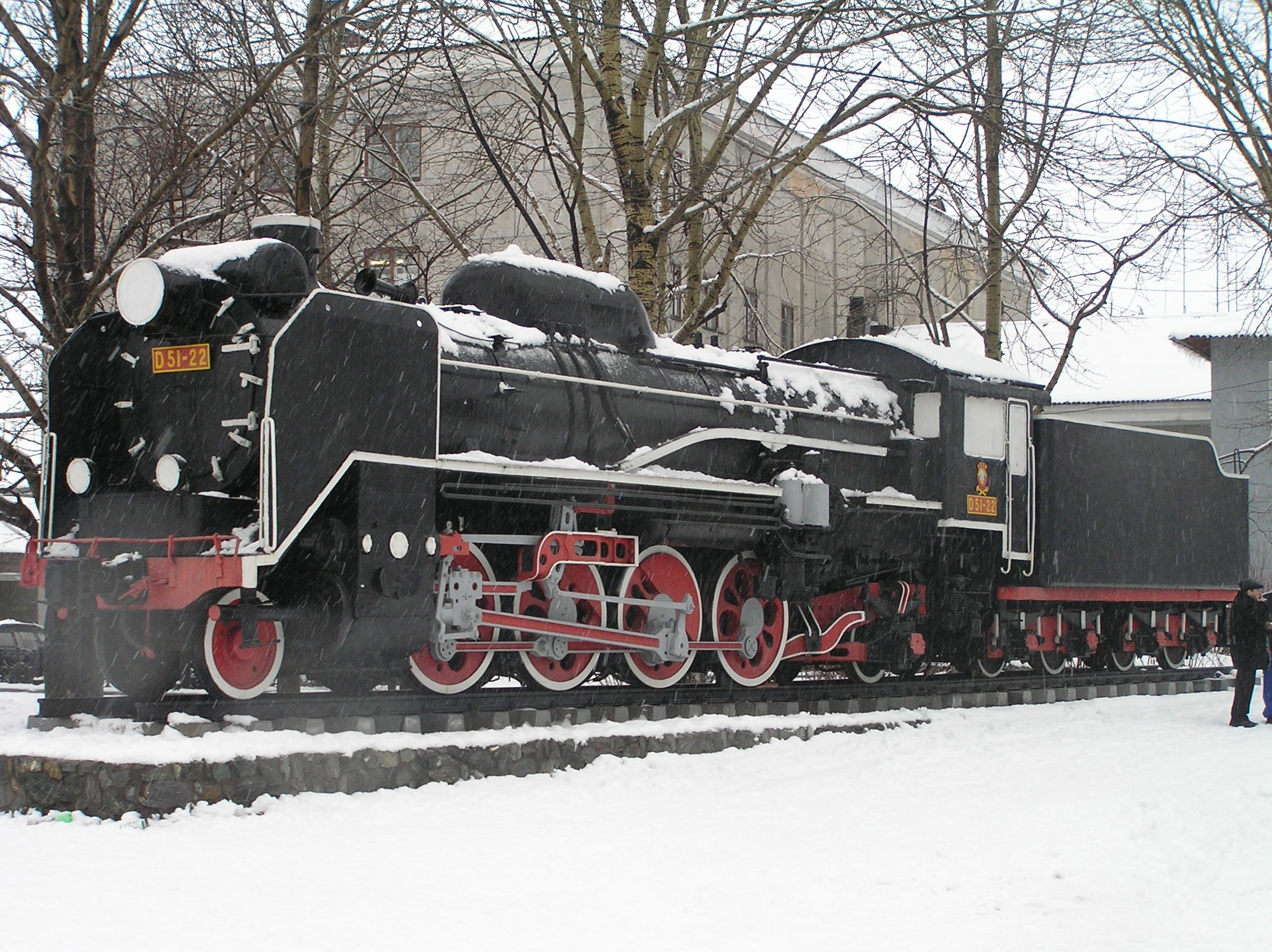
Japanese D51 steam locomotive outside the Yuzhno-Sakhalinsk Railway Station Sakhalin Island, Russia (2007)

As a result of Japan's loss in World War II, the southern half of Sakhalin Island was annexed by Soviet Union in 1945. The 1,067 mm (3 ft 6 in) railway network built by the Japanese during their forty years of control of southern Sakhalin now became part of Soviet Railways as well (as a separate Sakhalin Railway), the only 3 ft 6 in (1,067 mm) gauge rail system within USSR (or today's Russia). The original Japanese D51 steam locomotives were used by the Soviet Railways on Sakhalin Island until 1979, together with regauged ShA USATC S160 Class locomotives.

== Post-war development ==
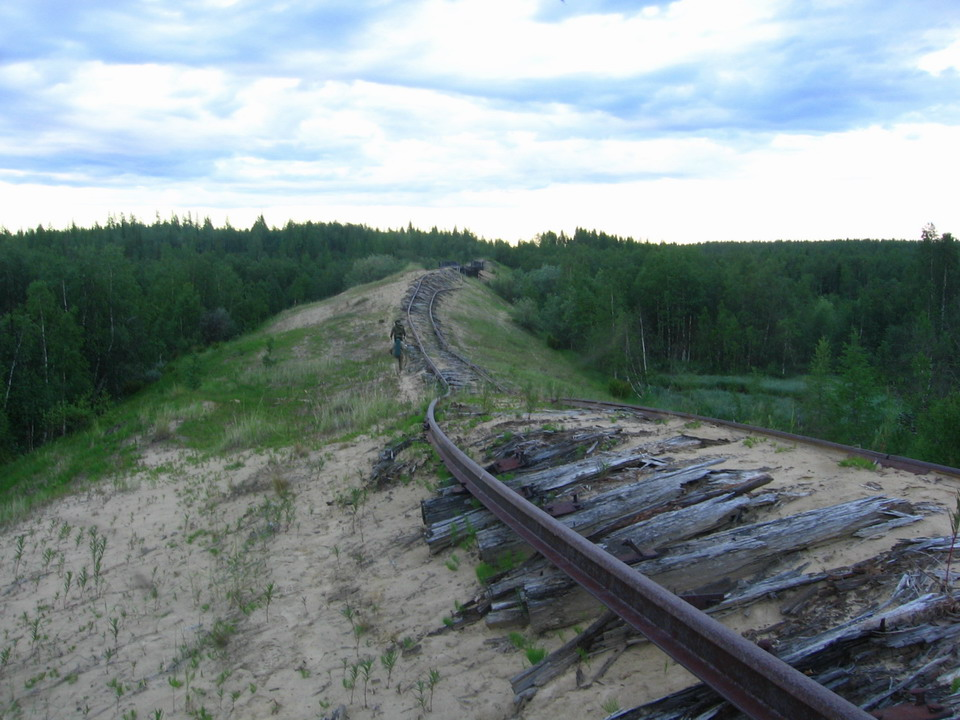
Remnants of the cancelled Salekhard–Igarka Railway

After the war the Soviet railway network was re-built and further expanded to more than 145,000 km of track by major additions such as Baikal Amur Mainline.

Soviet rail transport eventually became, after World War II, the most heavily used rail system in the world, surpassing all of its First World counterparts. However the rail network of the United States was a few times longer but had less traffic.

The Soviet railway system was growing in size, at a rate of 639 km a year from 1965 to 1980. This steady growth in rail transport can be explained by the country's need to extract its natural resources, most of which were located close to, or in Siberia. While some problems with the railways had been reported by the Soviet press, the Soviet Union could boast of controlling one of the most electrified railway systems at the time. During much of the country's later lifespan, trains usually carried coal, oil, construction material (mostly stone, cement and sand) and timber. Oil and oil products were one of the key reasons for building railway infrastructure in Siberia in the first place.

The efficiency of the railways improved over time, and by the 1980s Soviet railways had become the most intensively used in the world. Most Soviet citizens did not own private transport, and if they did, it was difficult to drive long distances due to the poor conditions of many roads. Another explanation has to do with Soviet policy, the first being the autarkic model created by Joseph Stalin's regime. Stalin's regime instead of building major new railway lines decided instead to conserve, and later expand, much of the existing railways left behind by the Tsars. However, as Lev Voronin, a First Deputy Premier of the Soviet Union, noted in a speech to the Supreme Soviet of the Soviet Union in 1989 that the railway sector was the "main negative sector of the economy in 1989". As industrial output declined in the late-1980s so did the demand for transportation.

== Comparison to the United States ==
The efficiency of the Soviet Railways improved over time and by the 1980s had many performances indicators superior to the United States. Railways built in the USSR were planned, and in contrast to the US, only a single railway line would be constructed between major cities. This avoided the situation in the US, where two (or sometimes more) railway companies would construct lines that more or less paralleled each other, resulting in wasteful duplication of effort. Many of the rail lines in the USSR were inherited from the Russian Empire, which had also avoided such duplication.

As a result of having a shorter rail system plus more freight traffic, the USSR had a freight traffic density (in ton-km per km of line) 6-7 times higher than the US. In the US, the mean daily freight car mileage was only 95 km. vs. 227 km. for the USSR. For freight locomotives, it was 360 km. vs. 425 km. The percent of freight car miles that ran empty was 41% for the US vs. 29% for the USSR. It was claimed that labor productivity rose 4.3-fold between 1955 and 1980, resulting in the USSR being roughly the same as the US (after taking into account that the USSR hauled a greater proportion of non-bulk commodities, which were more labor-intensive to haul—more switching of cars, etc.).

The Soviet Union made the transition to automatic brakes and couplers (model SA3) long after the United States did and as a result their brakes and couplers were somewhat more advanced. Their (air) brakes could operate in a mode where it was possible to slowly reduce braking effort, while the US system required full release of the brakes (in the entire train) and reapplication of the brakes in order to reduce braking effort. The Soviet Union developed advanced machinery for track maintenance and renewal such as a Continuous Action Tamping Machine which in 1977 could move at 3 km/h and also straighten the track and dress the ballast. It was model ВПО-3000 (VPO-3000) and at that time no such machinery like this existed outside of the Soviet Union. It was claimed to be several times faster than non-Soviet tamping machinery of cyclical action.

However, the reliability of locomotives in the USSR was much worse than for the US. Their high traffic density often resulted in traffic congestion and delays, especially after an accident blocked the line.

== Congestion and failure to transport ==
=== Harm to the Soviet Economy ===
The railway system in the Soviet Union (mostly after the 1920s) was utilized several times more intensively than the railways of developed capitalist countries. The high traffic volumes per kilometer of line resulted in congestion problems that at times became so severe that goods available for transport could not be shipped and factories, etc. were forced to slow production. This happened in the 1930s and during the so-called Brezhnev stagnation starting in the late 1970s and beyond. In 1989 the President of the Council of Ministers of the USSR stated that economists estimate that the failure of railways to provide adequate transportation, costs the Soviet economy 10-12 billion roubles per year.

=== Train flow basics ===
The flow on a transportation route (in tons/hour, trains/day, etc.) is simply equal to the product of velocity and linear density (gross tons/meter or trains/km etc.). For a railway line as a whole (in one direction), one would use the average linear density along the whole line, where most points on the line have no trains on them and thus have zero density there. One would also need to use the average velocity which turns out to be the weighted harmonic mean where the weights are the lengths of the various segments of the train run (with the speed approximately constant on each segment). Another way to find the average velocity is to simply find the weighted arithmetic mean where the weights in this case are the times on each segment. For a segment of a train run where the speed is very slow, the train thus spends a long time traversing this segment and thus the weight for this segment is quite high (since it is weighted by time). Thus even though the slow speed segments are only a small part of the trip, they may drastically reduce the average speed (and thus the flow).

So there are two basic ways to increase flow: 1. increase the speed 2. increase the density. One way to significantly increase speed on a high traffic line is to reduce the number of times a train must stop (or slow) to allow other trains to pass, especially on a single track line where opposing trains must go past each other. To increase density, one may increase train length, increase the linear load capacity of freight cars, and/or decrease the spacing between trains.

But the Automatic block signalling system tends to maintain a minimum distance between trains (moving under the green signal aspect). Trains may follow each other more closely if they move into the amber (or yellow) signal aspect but then they must move at a slower speed. On single track lines between passing sidings, trains can't travel in opposite directions at the same time. If they tried to do this, they would collide head on with each other (if they were headed toward each other). This poses a further restriction in train spacing.

=== Ways to increase capacity ===
There are various ways to permit rail freight flow capacity to increase, thus reducing congestion. But they are easier said than done. One is to increase the average density of freight on a rail line by increasing train weight/length. Another way is to decrease the distance (spacing) between successive trains. Still another way is to increase speed, including elimination of trains stopping.

=== Increasing freight flow by increasing density ===
One expedient is to reduce the spacing between 2 or 3 trains to zero by running "connected" trains. One simply couples two or more trains together without connecting the braking systems of the 2 trains. The locomotive crews then coordinate their handling of the train by radio possibly using a special device to synchronize braking. If they don't coordinate properly, the combined train can derail due to high forces in the train. This method was used in the Soviet Union mostly as a temporary expedient(especially in cases where a length of track was temporarily closed for maintenance work). But on the Bratsk division of the BAM railroad, it was used as a standard method of operation in the 1970s.

In the mid-1980s about 70% of the Soviet network was single track lines. It was proposed to select two large end stations on a single track line that have enough trackage to hold several trains. Then opposing trains accumulate at such stations and the trains that accumulated at one end station then proceed down the rail line closely spaced (a packet of trains) while traffic in the opposite opposing direction is spread out and yields (by pausing in the passing sidings) so that the packet of trains can travel non-stop over a significant distance. Later on, a non-stop packet can be formed in the other direction, etc. Using packets to increase capacity was common in the USSR.

== Railway labour ==
=== Amenities for rail workers ===
Especially in the 1970s, some railway depots/shops began to provide a much improved working environment and whole books were written on this subject, sometimes called "production esthetics" (производственная эстетика). An example was at the mechanised track maintenance station ПМС-121 (PMS-121) (in 2013 ЦМПР) near Kyiv in Ukraine. For the workers they installed showers, a shoe repair shop, a barber shop, a laundry, a small shop, a social club with a capacity for 200 people, a lounge, and an art studio. In the track assembly plant (they prefabricated lengths of track, with rails attached to sleepers/ties) they installed facilities for heating (and eating) food, a reading room and a billiard room. They also provided improved amenities when workers traveled to work on remote sections of track and lived in sleeping cars. As a result of the improved amenities, it is claimed that employee turnover was reduced from 63% (per year) to 11%.

Production esthetics included planting of greenery, providing proper lighting and pleasant colours, background music and sports areas.

=== Uniforms and insignia ===
Uniforms with grade insignia were introduced for rail workers during the period 1932–1934. Personal ranks were introduced in 1943. Personal ranks were abolished in 1954.

==== Grade insignia for rail workers under the People's Commissariat of Transport, 1934–1943 ====
Worn on collar patches.

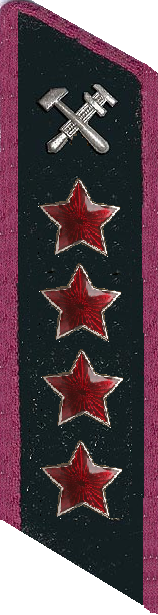
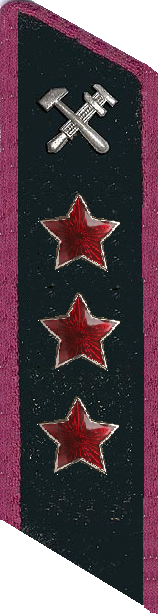
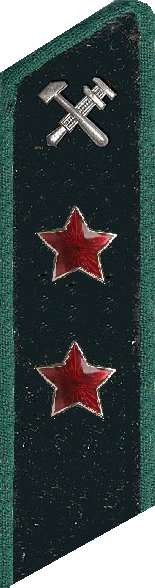
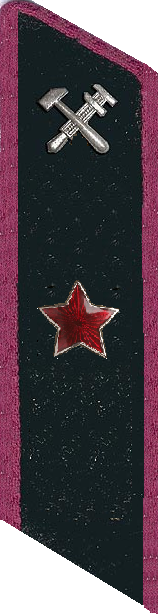
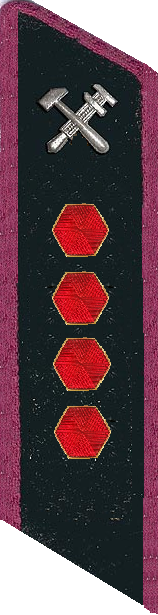
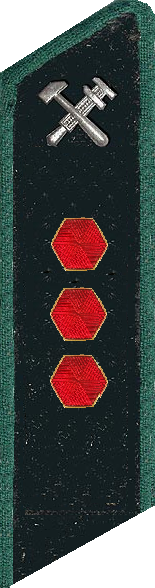
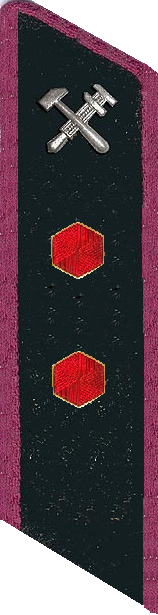
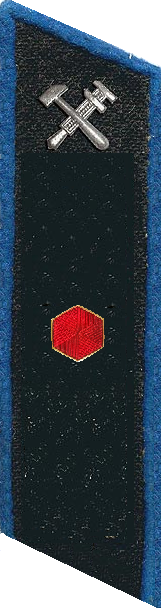
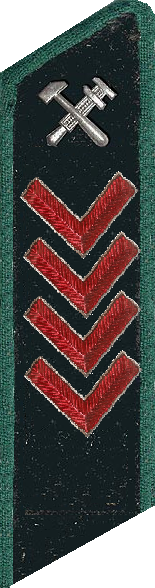
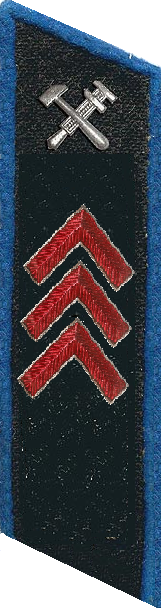
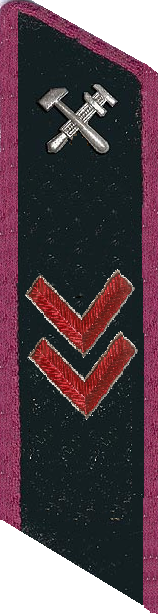
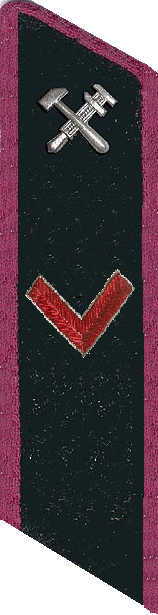
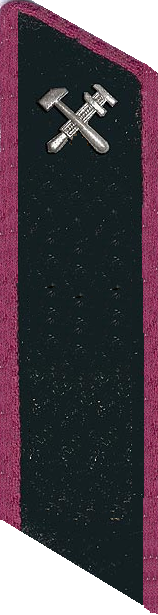
Employment Categories	Higher Leadership Category				Senior Leadership Category (middle category)				Junior Leadership Category				Ordinary Employment Category
Collar Patches
Grade	12	11	10	9	8	7	6	5	4	3	2	1	Ordinary worker

==== Grade insignia for rail workers under the industrial commissariats, 1936–1943 ====
Worn on the lower sleeves of the uniform coat.

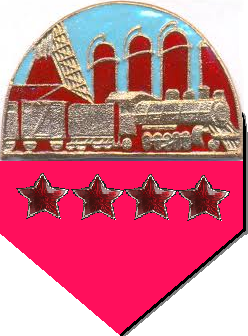
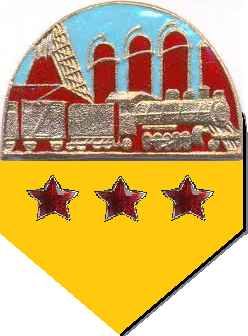
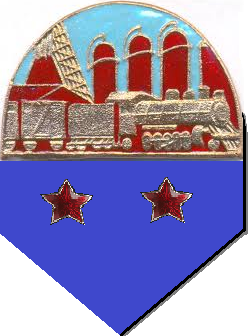
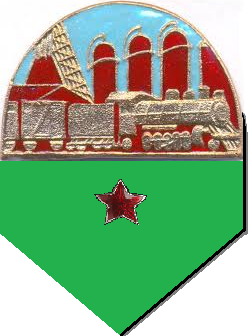
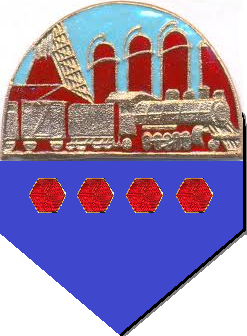
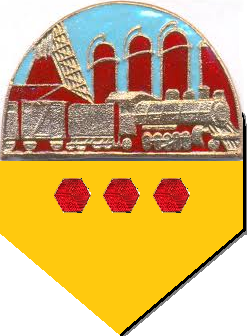
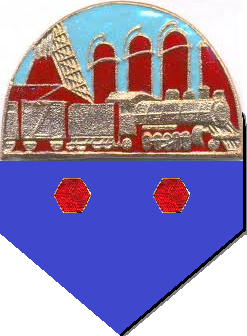
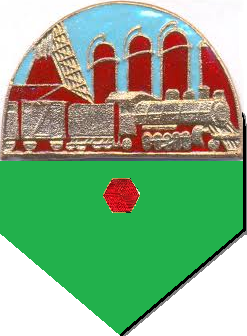
	Higher Leadership Category				Senior Leadership Category (middle category)
Grade	12	11	10	9	8	7	6	5

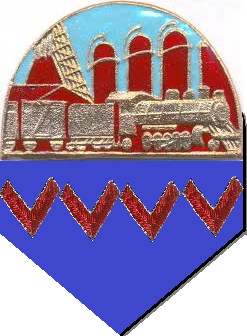
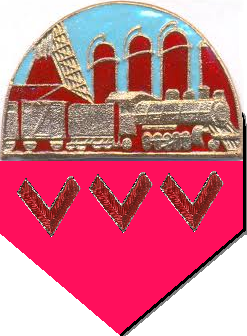
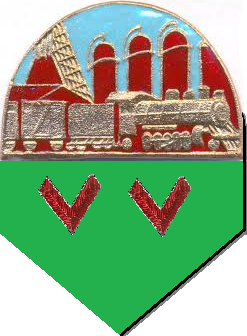
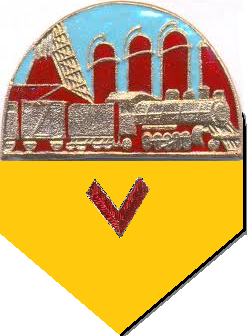
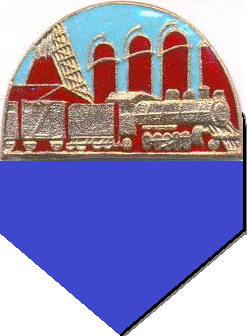
	Junior Leadership Category				Ordinary Employment Category
Grade	4	3	2	1	Ordinary Worker

==== Railway rank insignia 1943–1955 ====
Worn on shoulder straps.

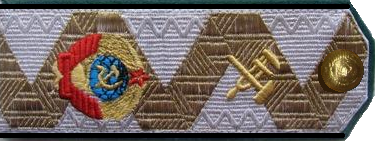
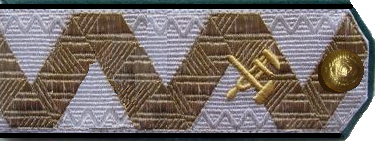
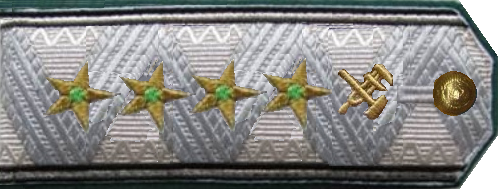
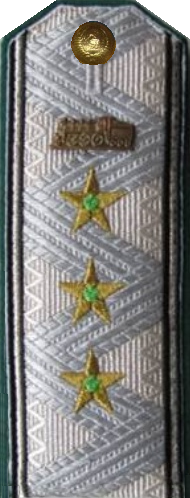
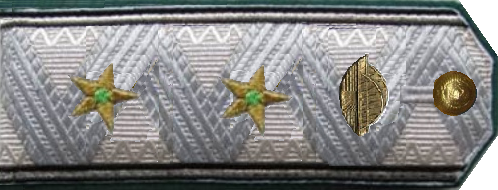
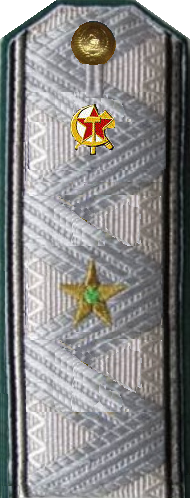
	Director General of Railways	Deputy Director General of Railways 1st Class	Deputy Director General of Railways 2nd Class	Director General 1st Class	Director General 2nd Class	Director General 3rd Class

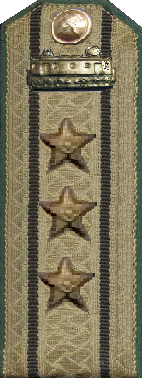
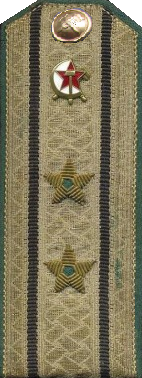
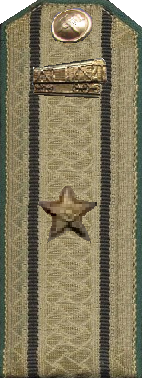
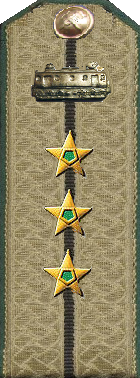
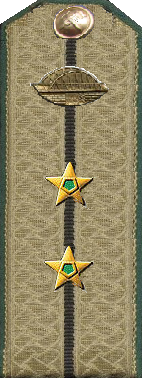
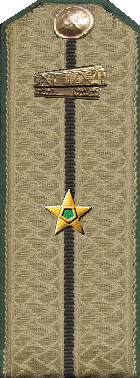
	Colonel-Director	Lieutenant Colonel-Director	Major-Engineer	Captain-Engineer	Lieutenant-Engineer	Lieutenant-Technician

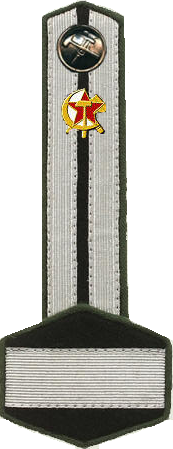
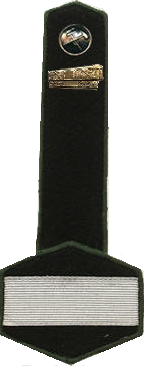
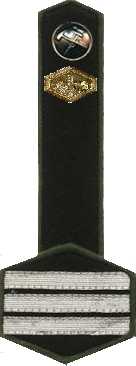
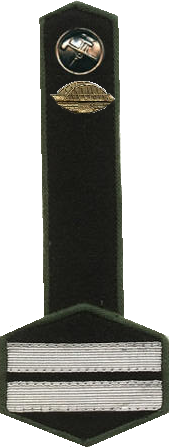
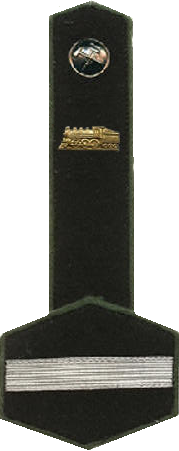
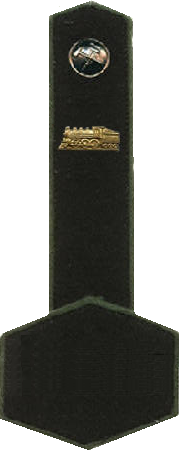
	Technician 1st Class	Technician 2nd Class	Technician 3rd Class	Senior Foreman	Foreman	Ordinary Worker

==== Grade insignia for rail workers 1955–1963 ====
Worn on collar patches.

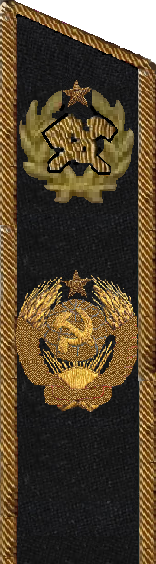
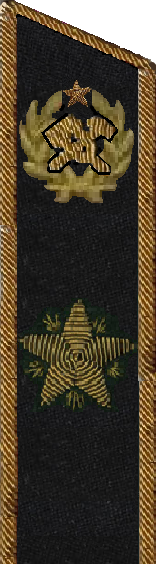
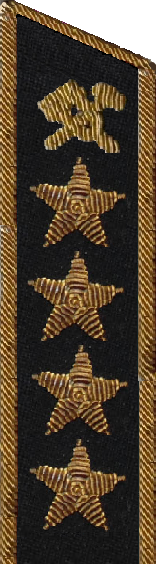
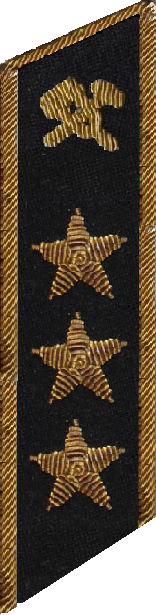
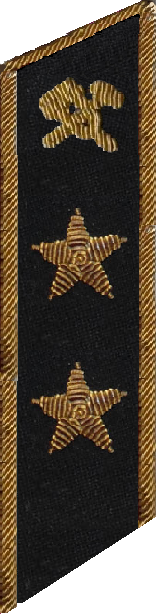
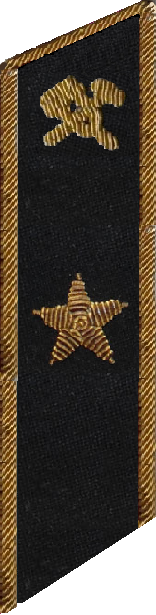
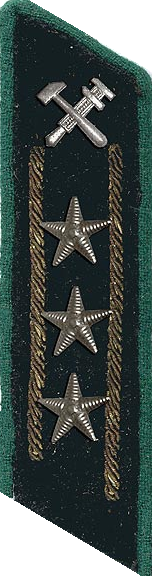
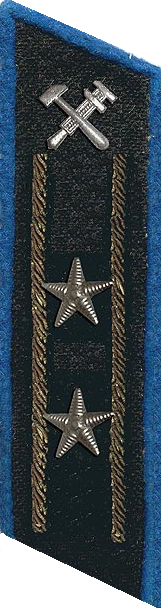
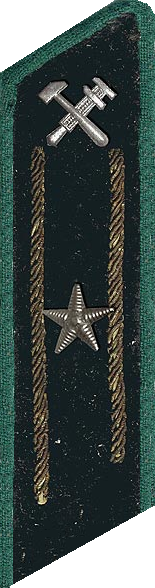
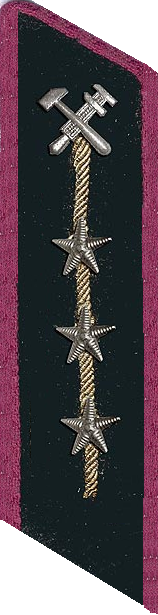
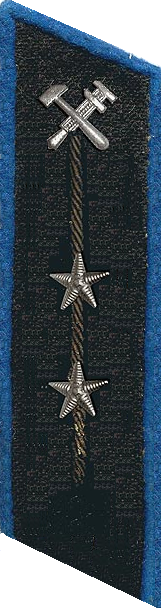
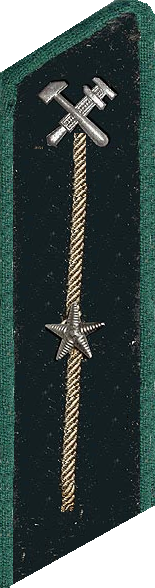
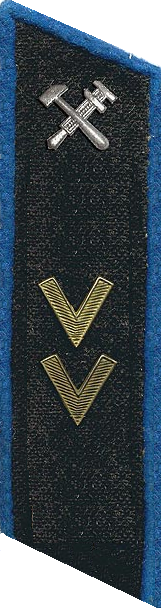
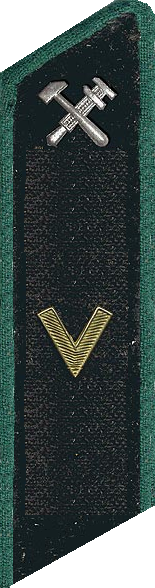
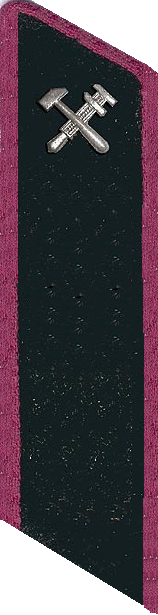
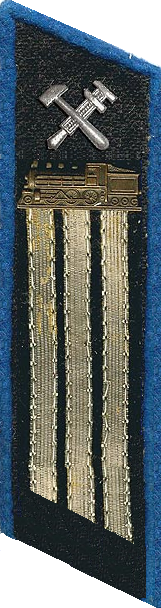
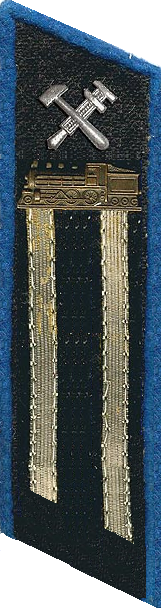
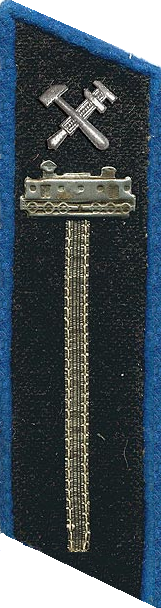
	Railway Ministry			Higher Leadership	Senior Leadership	Middle Leadership	Junior Leadership	Ordinary Workers	Locomotive Engineers
Source:	A	B	C						1	2	3

A = Minister of Railways; B = First Deputy Minister of Railways, C = Deputy Minister of Railways; 1 = Locomotive Engineer First Class; 2 = Locomotive Engineer Second Class; 3 = Locomotive Engineer Third Class.

==== Grade insignia for rail workers 1963–1973 ====
Worn on the lower sleeves of the uniform coat.

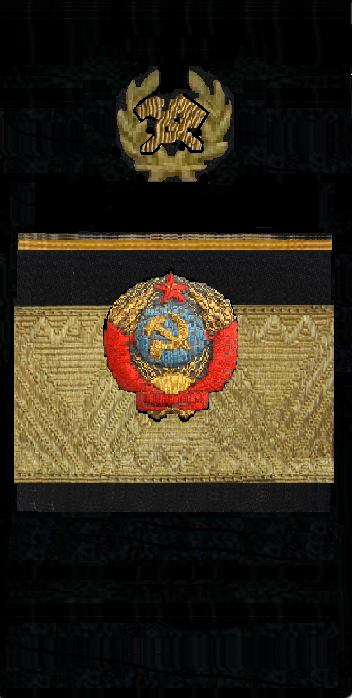
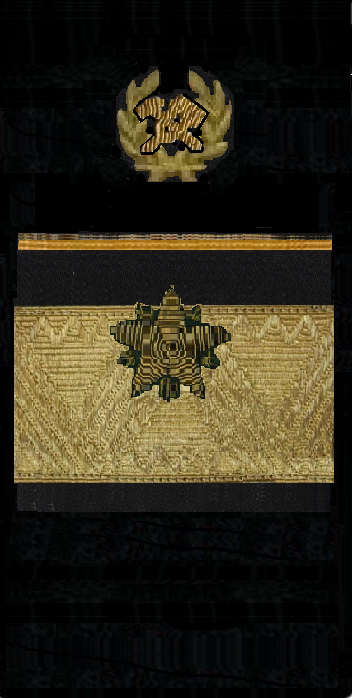
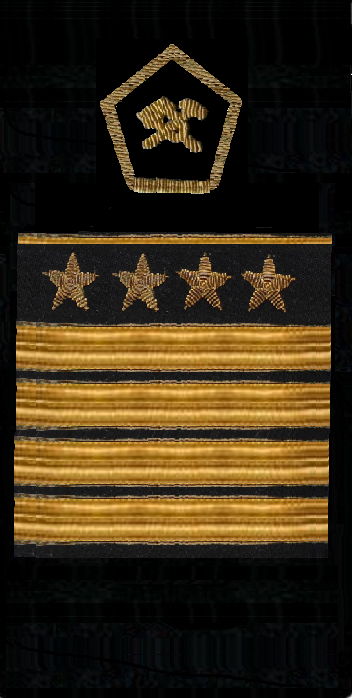
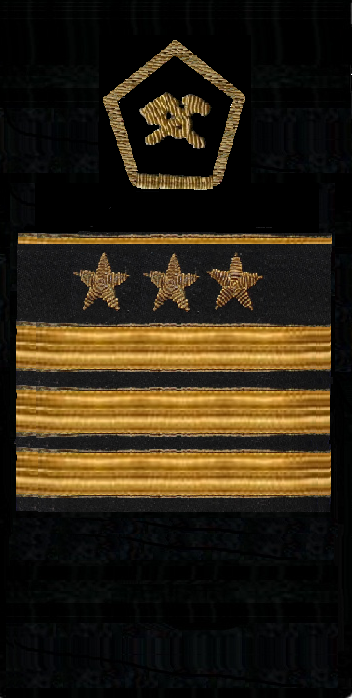
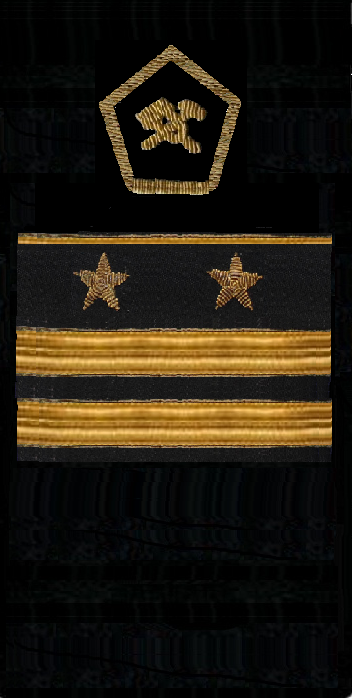
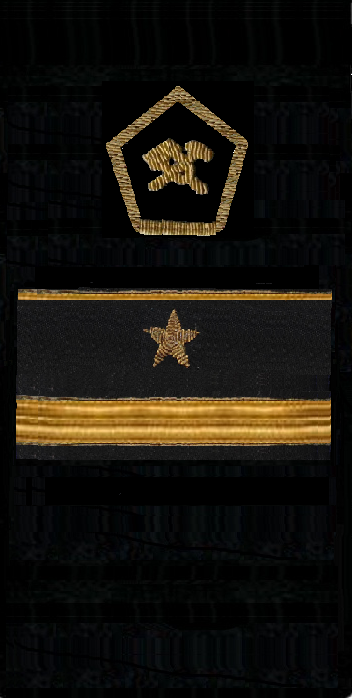
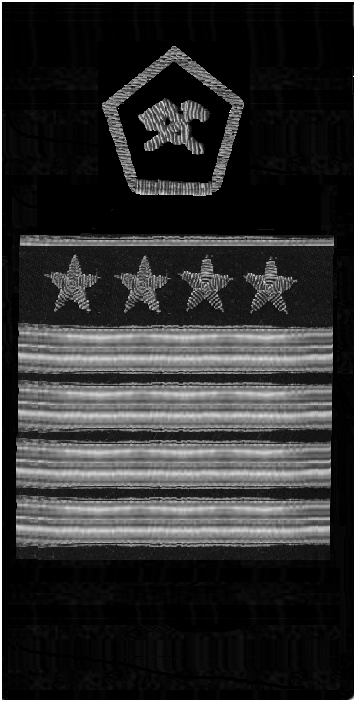
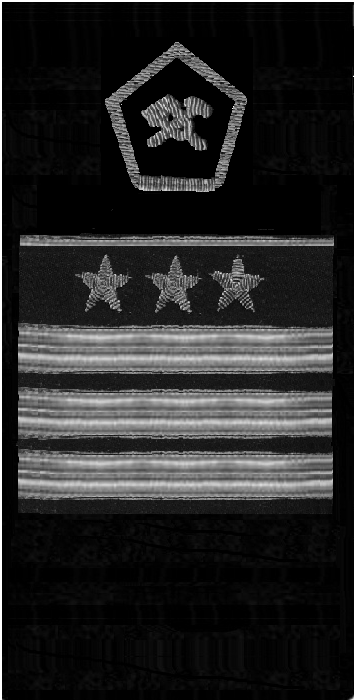
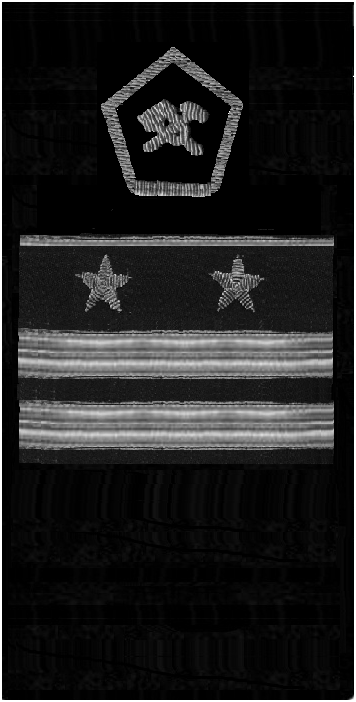
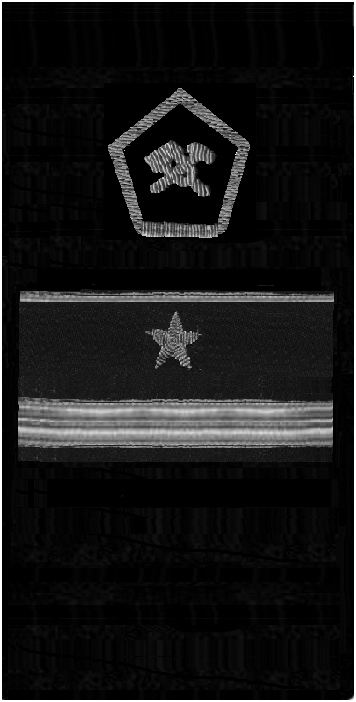
Railway Ministry		Higher Leadership				Senior Leadership
Railway Minister	First Deputy Minister	Deputy Minister	Head of Principal Administration	Chief Engineer	Principal Controller	Head of Department	Senior Controller	Station Master of out-of-class station	Station Master of 1st class station

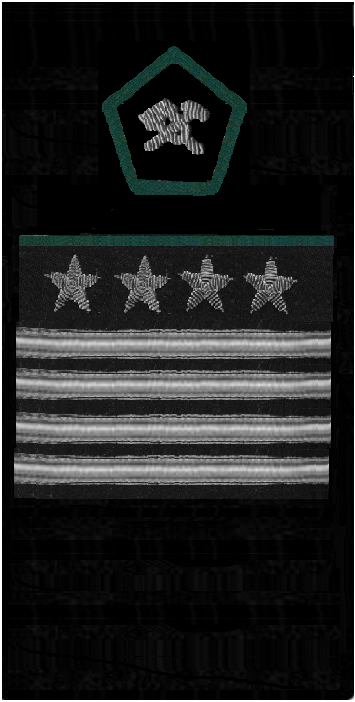
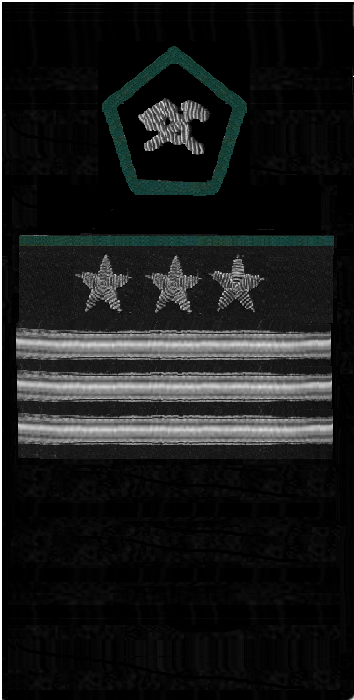
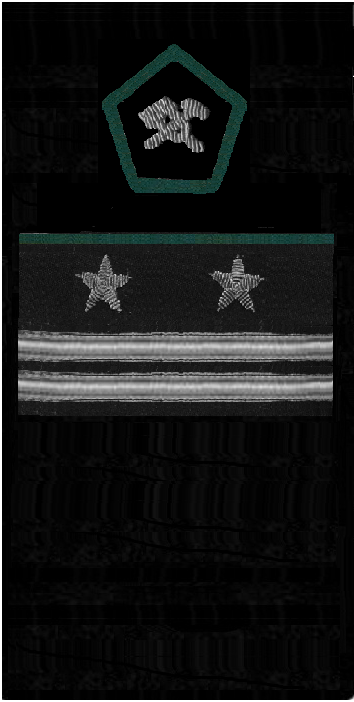
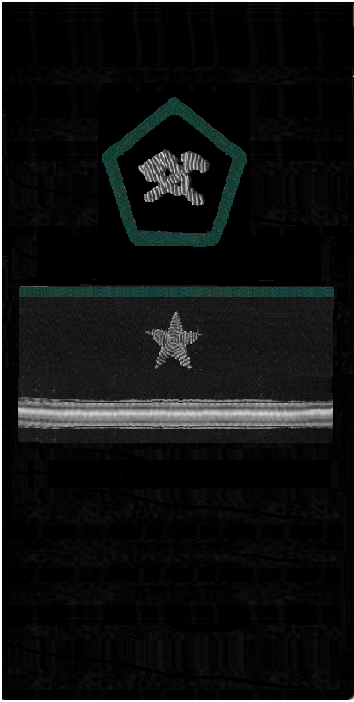
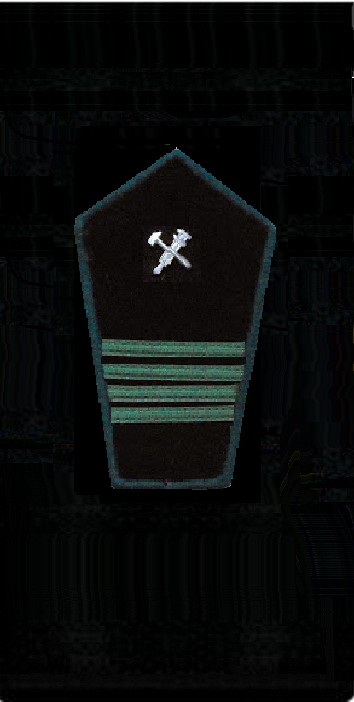
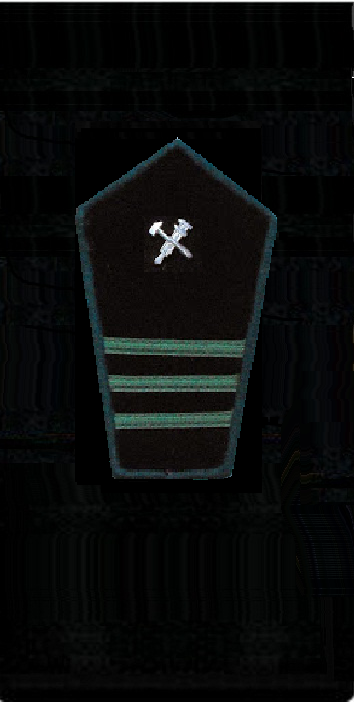
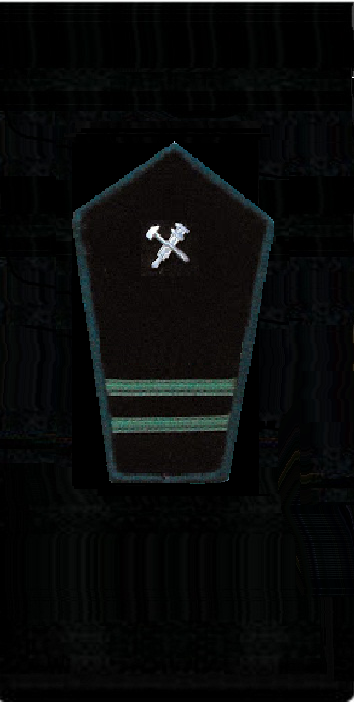
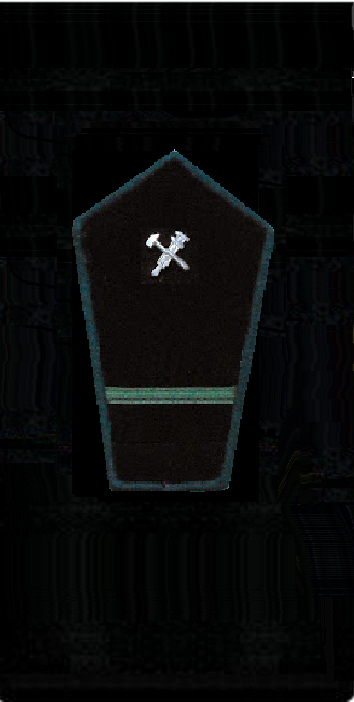
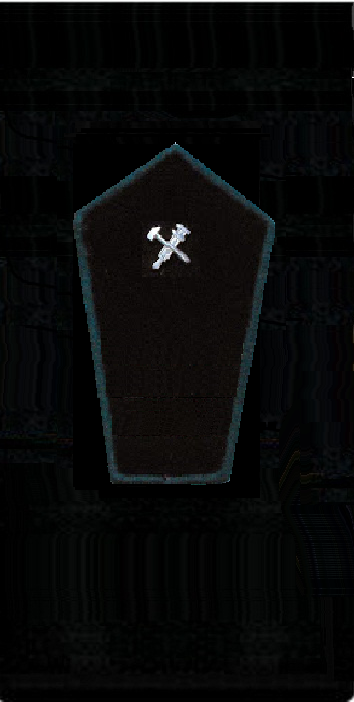
Middle Leadership				Junior Leadership				Ordinary Workers
Station Master of 2nd class station	Station Master of 3rd class station	Station Master of 4th class station	Station Master of 5th class station	Locomotive Engineer 3rd/4th Class	Motorcar Driver	Assistant Locomotive Engineer	Senior Worker	Worker

==== Grade insignia for rail workers 1973–1979 ====
Worn on the lower sleeves of the uniform coat.

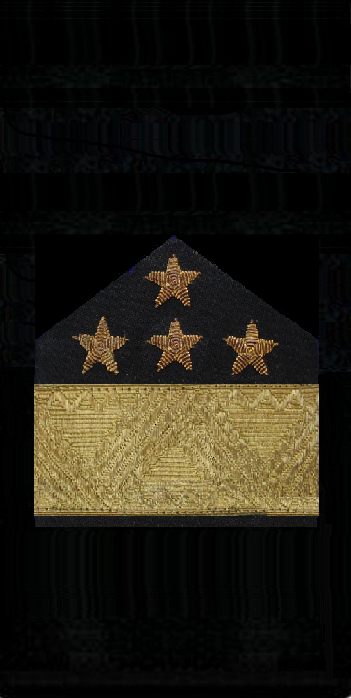
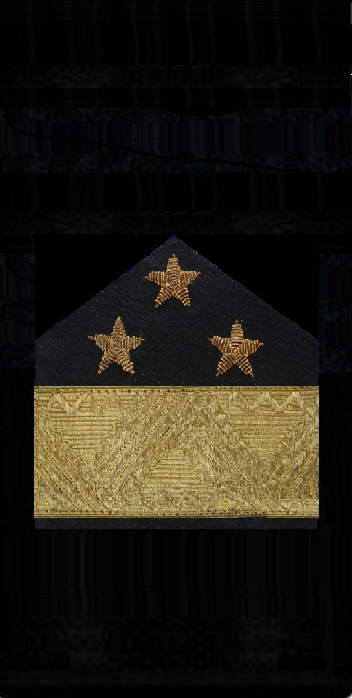
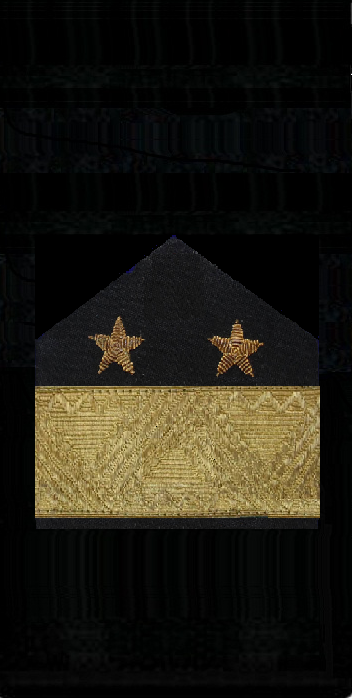
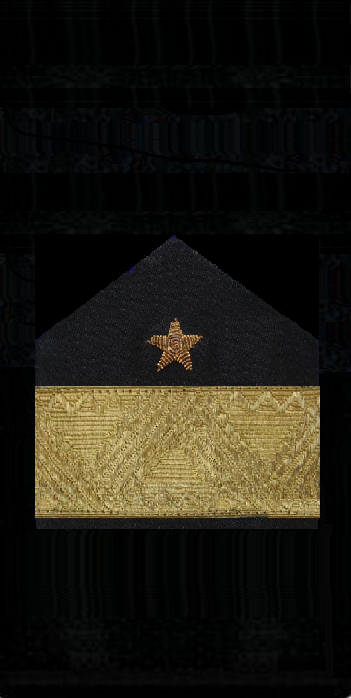
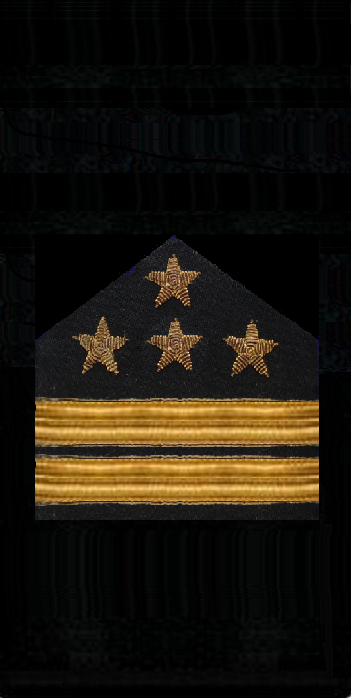
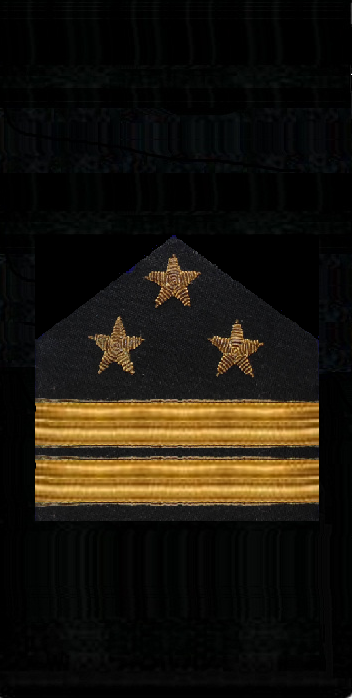
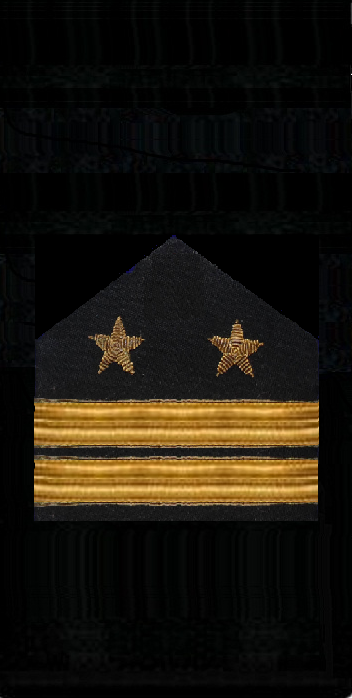
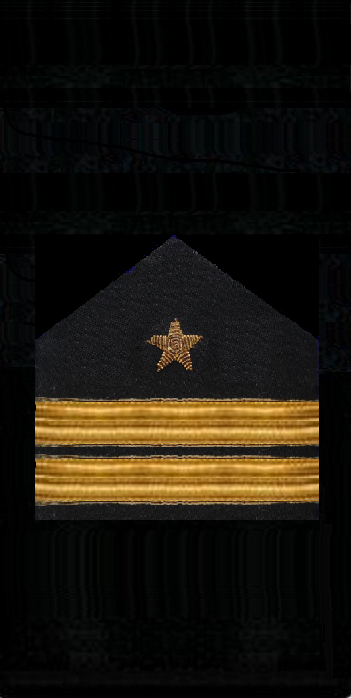
	Higher Leadership	Senior Leadership

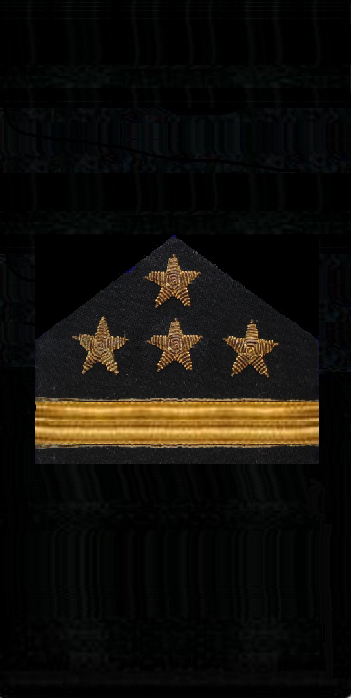
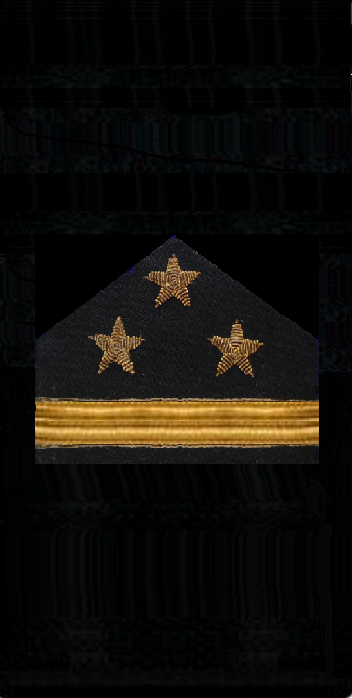
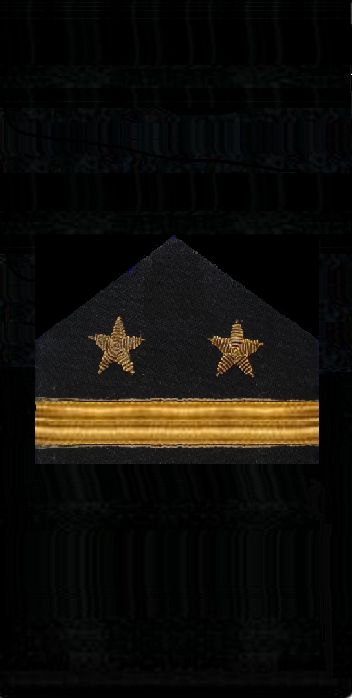
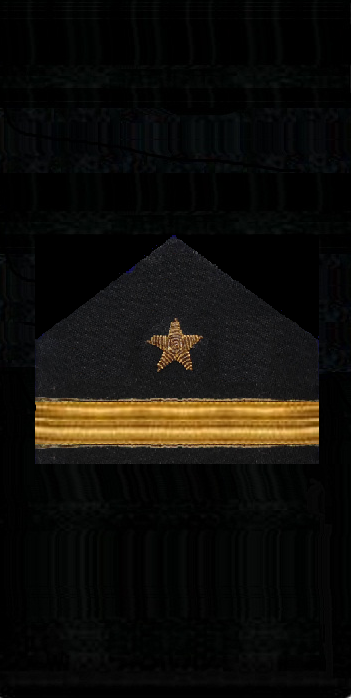
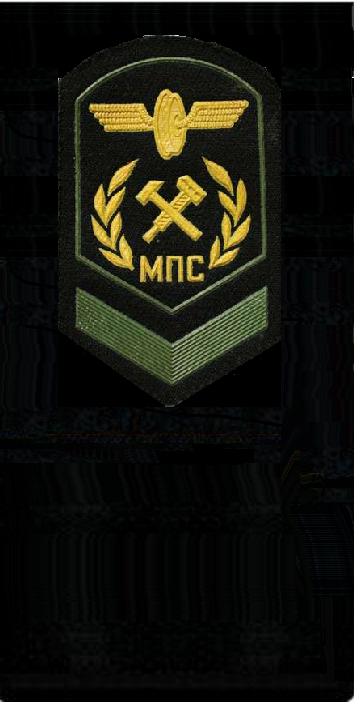
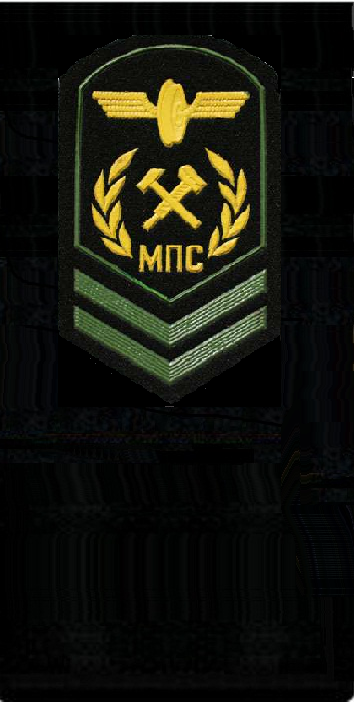
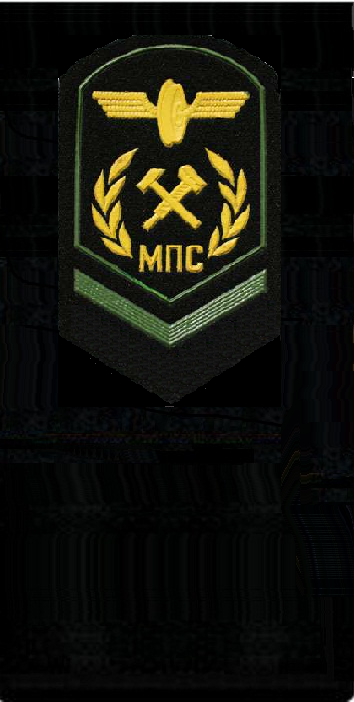
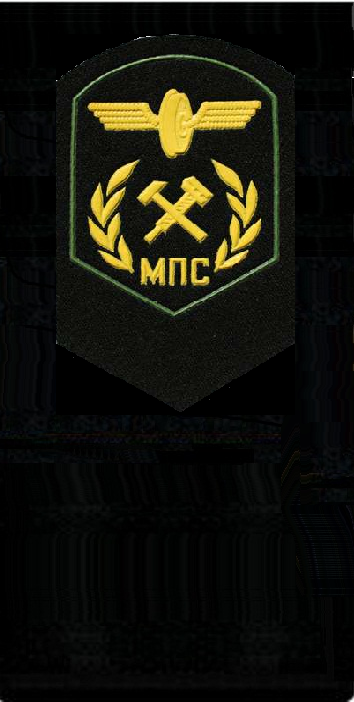
	Middle Leadership	Junior Leadership	Ordinary Workers

==== Grade insignia for rail workers 1979–1985 ====
Worn on the lower sleeves of the uniform coat.

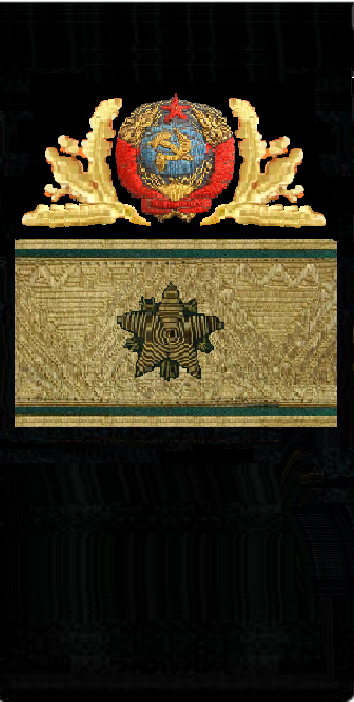
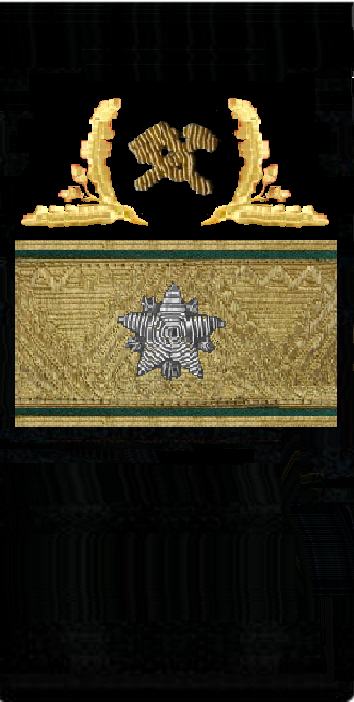
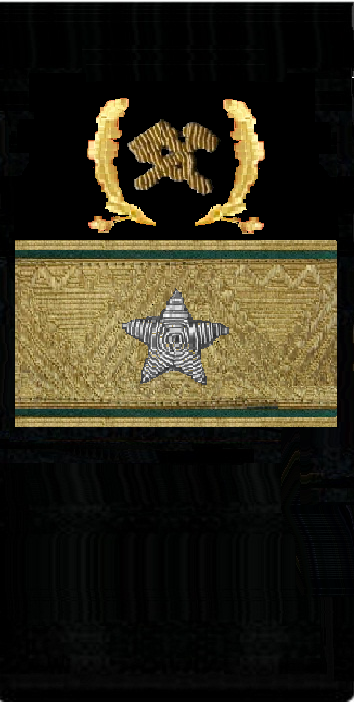
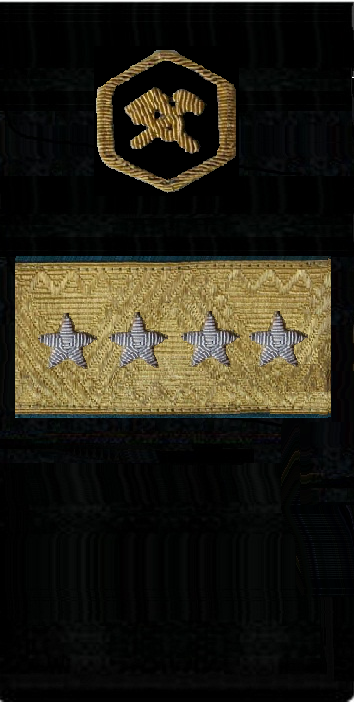
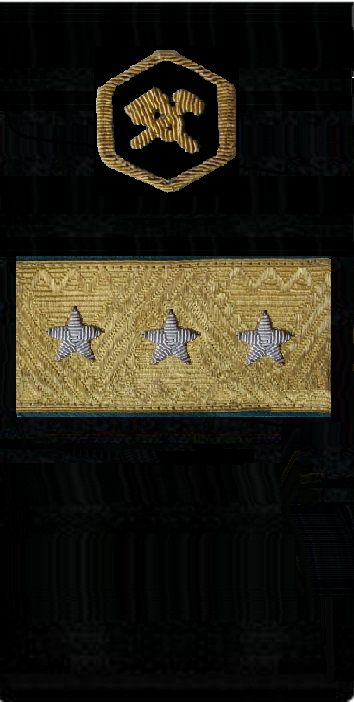
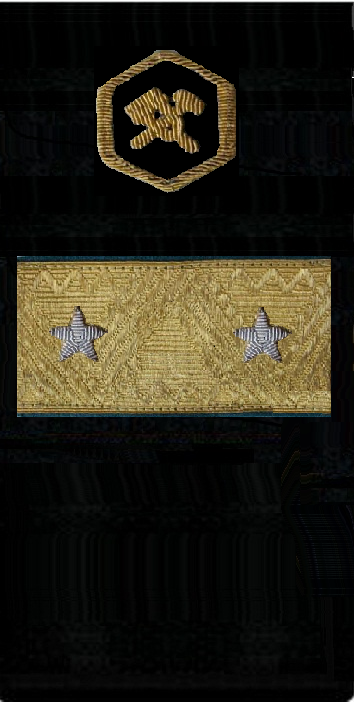
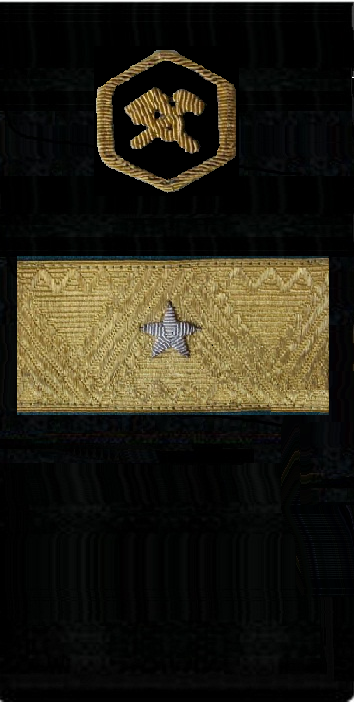
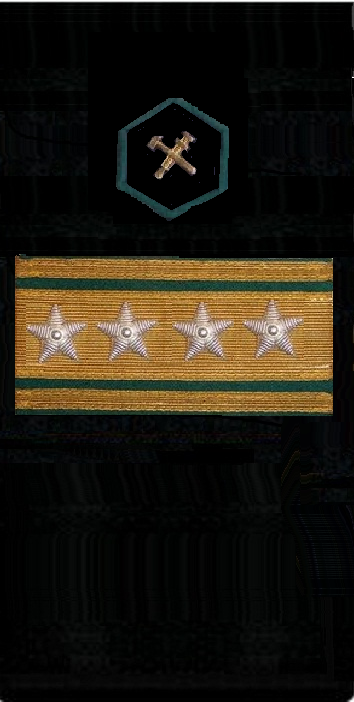
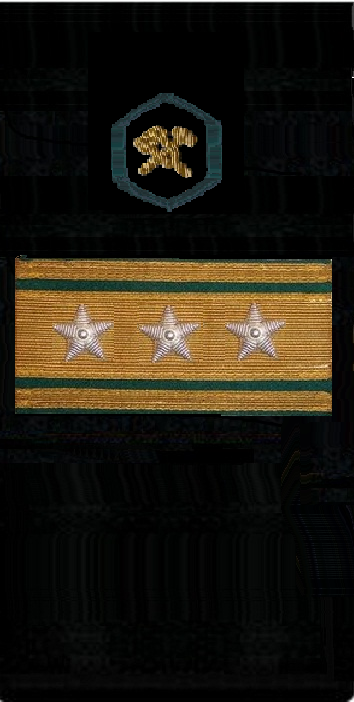
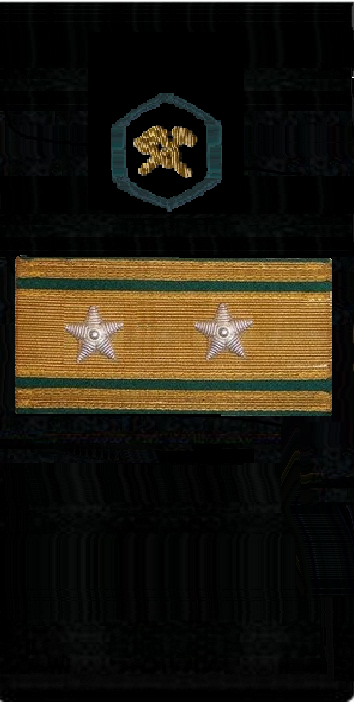
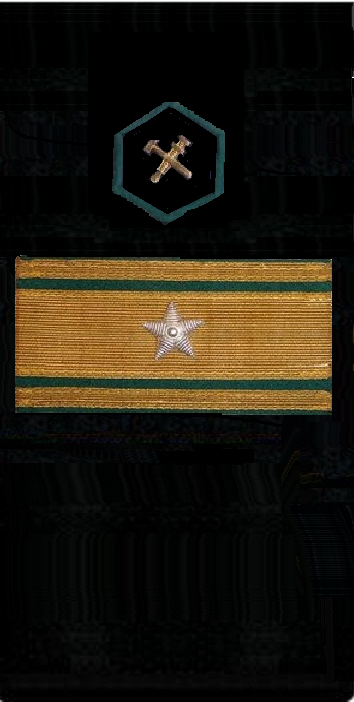
	Railway Ministry	Higher Leadership	Senior Leadership

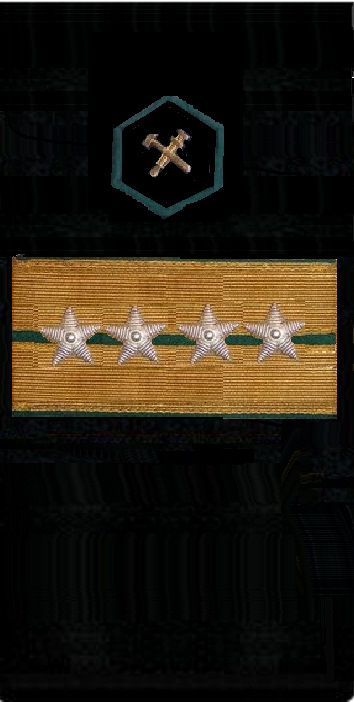
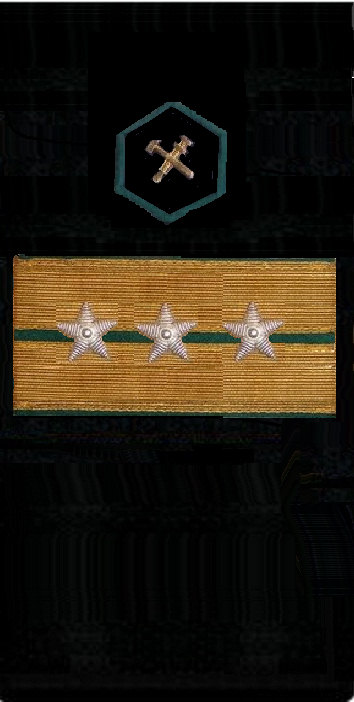
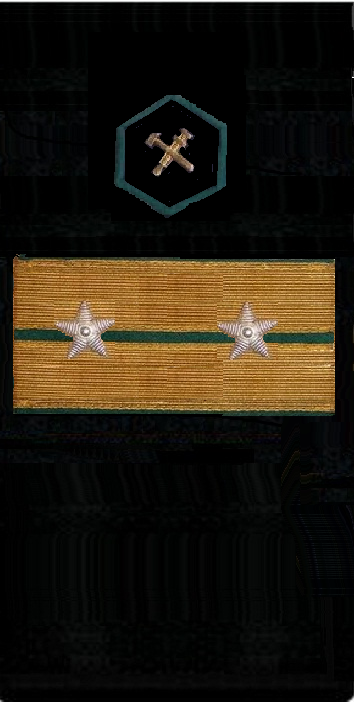
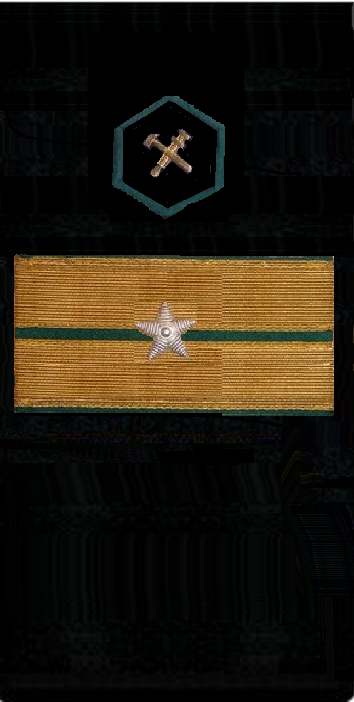
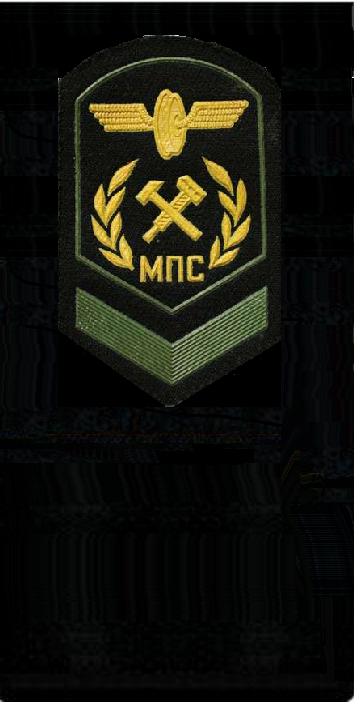
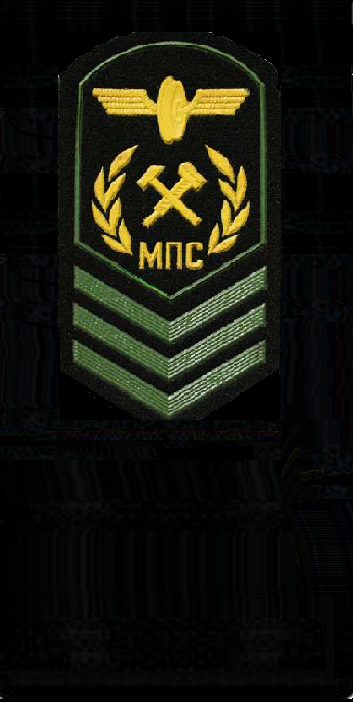
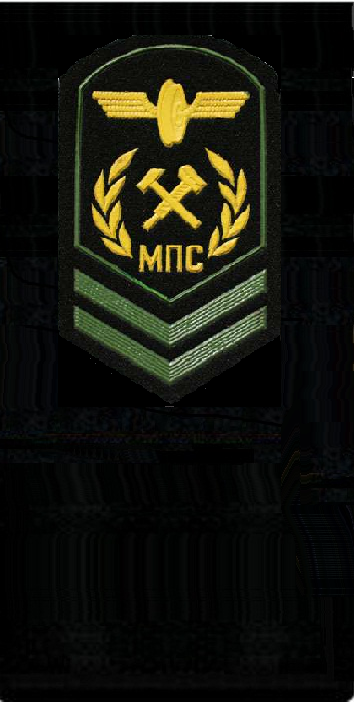
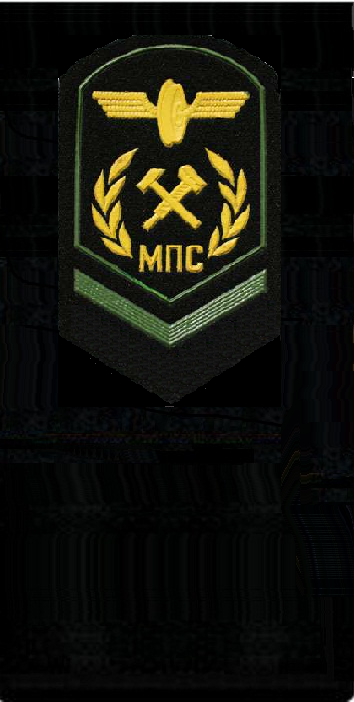
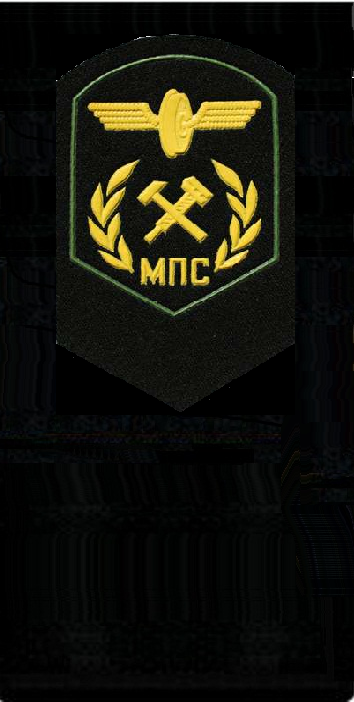
	Middle Leadership	Junior Leadership	Ordinary Workers

== Commuter services ==
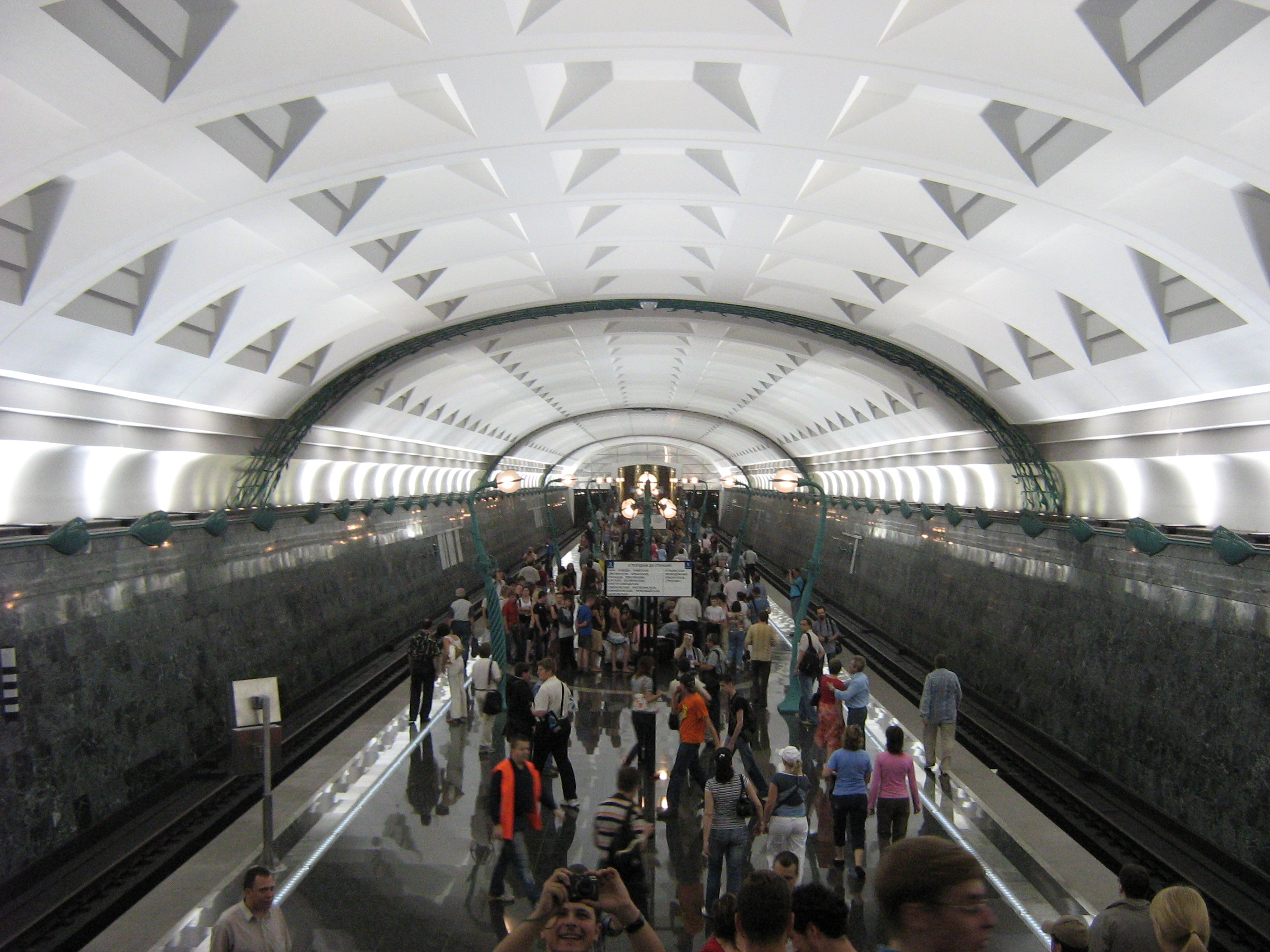
The Moscow Metro is the second busiest rapid transit system in the world.

The Soviet rapid transit system was seen as the cheapest way of urban transport, and eventually another point acquired greater significance; the authorities could allocate their resources from the automobile industry to the rapid transit sector and save a substantial volume of the country's diesel and petrol. Because metros were cheaper to operate and less energy consuming, the Soviet authorities managed to construct 20 rapid transits nationwide, with a further nine in construction when the Soviet Union collapsed. Twenty other stations were under construction in 1985. The country's rapid transit system was the most intensively used in the world.

== Dieselization ==
The Soviet Union was a pioneer in the development of the diesel locomotive to replace the steam locomotive (dieselization) on non-electrified lines. But the USSR failed to make steady progress and while they led the United States at first, they soon fell behind and their last steam locomotives were retired about 15 years later than for the US. The first mainline diesel locomotive in the world began running in 1924 in the USSR but it had an excessive number of breakdowns so other designs of diesel locomotives were developed and used in desert regions where water for steam locomotives was scarce. Then in 1937 the small scale production (only several units per year) of diesel locomotives (for desert use) came to a halt by order of Kaganovich, the head of the national railway committee (NKPS) and a leading figure in the Communist party.

In the late 1930s, interest in diesels was rekindled by reports from the US that production of diesel locomotives was overtaking production of steam locomotives. The USSR was able to order 100 of them from the United States via lend lease during World War II. Half of them were ALCOs and the other half Baldwins. All were 1000 hp which in the US were primarily used for switching and for short trains but were suitable for mainline operation in the Soviet Union. But they didn't begin arriving in the USSR until the start of 1945 when the war was almost over.

After the end of the war, the production of diesel locomotives, which had been curtailed in 1937, was resumed with the first locomotives appearing in 1947. The US-made ALCO was superior to the pre-war Soviet design so it was used as a prototype for a new TEx (x=1,2,3,5) series of Soviet locomotives. The dimensions were converted to metric and sometimes modified, the Soviet system of air brakes were used, and the engine speeds at certain controller positions were changed. The TE2 had double the power of the TE1 and was produced until in 1955 it was superseded by the TE3. The TE5 was just a variation of the TE1 and of minor significance.

== Electrification ==
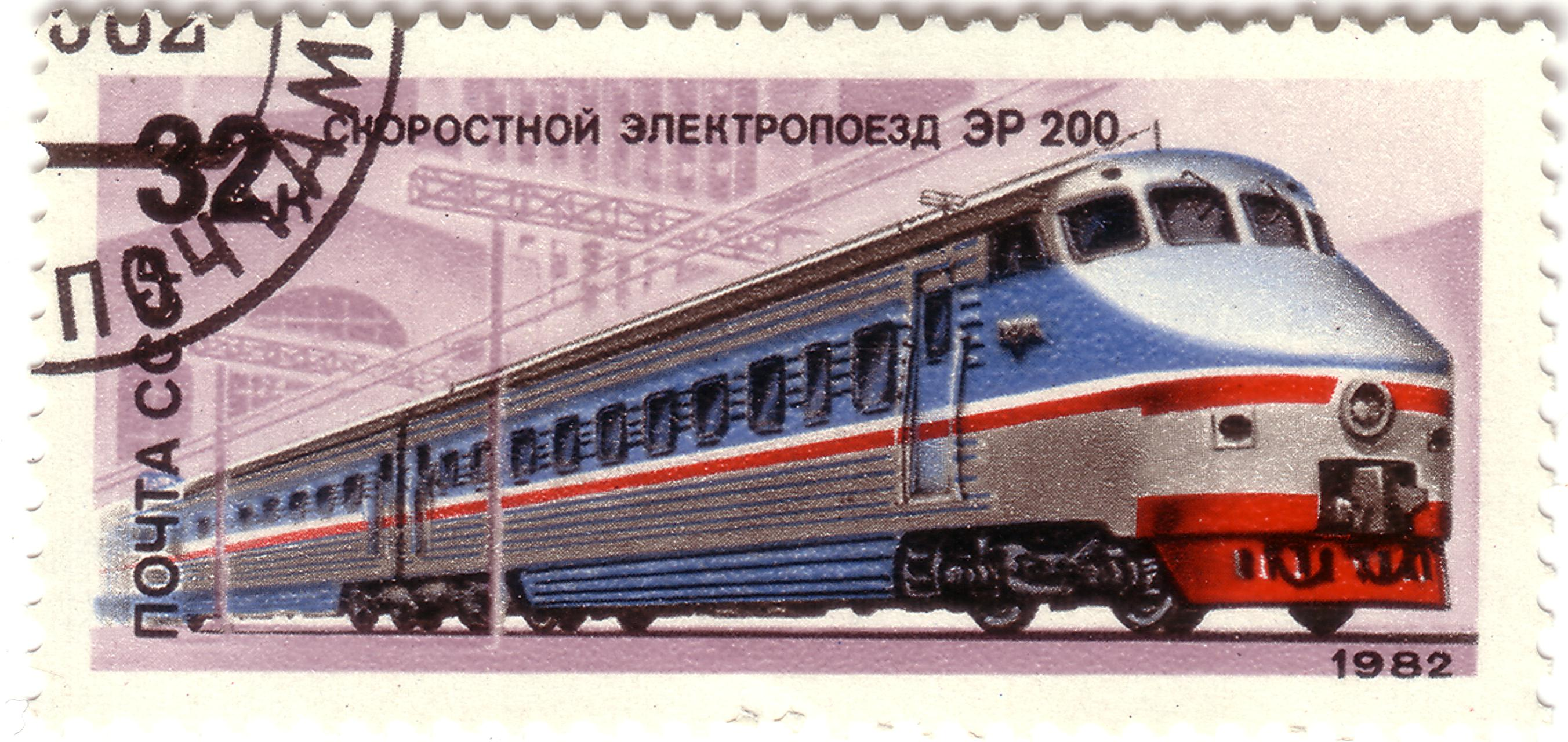
Soviet ER-200 train-set.

While the former Soviet Union got a late (and slow) start with rail electrification in the 1930s it eventually became the world leader in electrification in terms of the volume of traffic under the wires. During the last 30 years of the Soviet Union, it hauled as much rail freight as all the other countries in the world combined and in the end, over 60% of this was by electric locomotives. Electrification was cost effective due to the very high density of traffic and was at times projected to yield at least a 10% return on investment (as compared to diesel traction). By 1990, the electrification was about half 3 kV DC and half 25 kV AC 50 Hz and 70% of rail passenger-km was by electric railways.

== Railway colleges ==
The Soviet Union had several railway colleges which trained engineers specializing in railway topics. Most of them still exist.

== Post-Soviet rail traffic ==
After the dissolution of the Soviet Union in 1991, railway traffic in Russia sharply declined and new major electrification projects were not undertaken except for the line to Murmansk which was completed in 2005. Work continued on completing the electrification of the Trans-Siberian Railway, but at a slower pace, finishing in 2002. However, the percent of tonne-kilometers hauled today by electric trains has increased to about 85%.

== Railway book publication ==
The Soviet Union published a large number of books on railways. For just the last half of 1956, 148 titles were published. Some of these books were very short, perhaps only fifteen pages. But many were a few hundred pages long and some were written as textbooks for use in railway classes in railway colleges.

== See also ==
- History of rail transport in Russia
- Transport in the Soviet Union
- The Museum of the Moscow Railway
- Russian Railway Museum, in St. Petersburg

== Bibliography ==
=== In English ===
- Boublikoff, A.A. "A suggestion for railroad reform" in book: Buehler, E.C. (editor) "Government ownership of railroads", Annual debater's help book (vol. VI), New York, Noble and Noble, 1939; pp. 309–318. Original in journal "North American Review, vol. 237, pp. 346+. (Title is misleading. It's 90% about Russian/Soviet railways.)
- Hunter, Holland. Soviet Transport Experience: Its Lessons For Other Countries, Brookings Institution 1968.
- Omrani, Bijan. Asia Overland: Tales of Travel on the Trans-Siberian and Silk Road Odyssey Publications, 2010 ISBN 962-217-811-1
- "Railroad Facts" (Yearbook) Association of American Railroads, Washington, DC (annual).
- "Transportation in America", Statistical Analysis of Transportation in the United States (18th edition), with historical compendium 1939–1999, by Rosalyn A. Wilson, pub. by Eno Transportation Foundation Inc., Washington, DC, 2001. See table: Domestic Intercity Ton-Miles by Mode, pp. 12–13.
- UN (United Nations) Statistical Yearbook. The earlier editions were designated by date (such as 1985/86) but later editions use the edition number (such as 51st). After 1985/86 the "World railway traffic" table was dropped. After the 51st ? edition, the long table: "Railways: traffic" was dropped resulting in no more UN railway statistics.
- Urba CE, "The railroad situation : a perspective on the present, past and future of the U.S. railroad industry". Washington : Dept. of Transportation, Federal Railroad Administration, Office of Policy and Program Development Govt. Print. Off., 1978.
- VanWinke, Jenette and Zycher, Benjamin; "Future Soviet Investment in Transportation, Energy, and Environmental Protection" A Rand Note. The Rand Corporation, Santa Monica, CA, 1992. Rand Soviet Transport
- Ward, Christopher J., Brezhnev's Folly: The Building of BAM and Late Soviet Socialism, University of Pittsburgh Press, 2009.
- Westwood J.N., 2002 Soviet Railways to Russian Railways Palgrave Macmillan.
- Westwood, J. N. (1994). "Chapter 8: Transport". In Davies, R.W.; Harrison, Mark; Wheatcrofttitle, S. G. (eds.). The Economic Transformation of the Soviet Union, 1913–1945. Cambridge; New York: Cambridge University Press. pp. 158–181. ISBN 978-0-521-45770-5.

=== In Russian ===
- Аксененко,Н.Е., Бернгард, Ф.К., Богданов, Г.И "История железнодорожного транспорта России и Советского Союза, Т.2 : 1917–1945 гг" (History of railway transport in Russia and the Soviet Union, vol.2, 1917–1945) St. Petersburg, ПГУПС (a railway university) 1994–1997. - ISBN 5-85952-005-0 (The same ISBN is also used for vol.1: 1836–1917) 415 pp.
- Громов, Н.Н.; Панченко, Т.А.; Чудновский, А.Д.; "Еденая транспорттная система (Unified Transportation System), Москва, Транспорт, 1987 (textbook).
- Дробинский В.А., Егунов П.М. "Как устроен и работает тенловоз" (How the diesel locomotive works) 3rd ed. Moscow, Транспорт, 1980.
- Ж/Д Транс.=Железнодорожный транцорт (Zheleznodorozhnyi transport =Railway transportation) (a magazine)
- Иванова В.Н. (ed.) "Конструкция и динамика тепловозов" (Construction and dynamics of the diesel locomotive). Москва, Транспорт, 1968 (textbook).
- Иноземцев В.Г., Казаринов Б.М., Ясенцев В.Ф. "Автоматические тормоза" (Automatic Brakes) Москва, Транспорт, 1981 (textbook).
- Кузьмич В.Д., Левин Б.А, Фадеев Г.М.(editors) "История железнодорожного транспорта Советского Союза, Т.3 : 1945–1991 гг" (History of railway transport in the Soviet Union, vol.3, 1945–1991); Г. М. Афонина et al. - Moscow: Академкнига/ Moscow, 2004. - 631 pp. ISBN 5-94628 110-0
- Лехно,И.Б. (ed.) "Путевое хозяйство" (Railway track maintenance), Moscow Транспорт 1981 (textbook)
- Макарочкин А.М., Дьяков Ю.В. "Использование и развитие пропускной способности железчух дорог" (Utilizing and development of traffic capacity of railway) Moskva, Транспорт 1981.
- "Народное хозяйство СССР, в 19?? г. (Статистический ежегодник)" (Narodnoe khoziaistvo SSSR = National economy of the USSR)(a statistical yearbook). Москва (Moscow) "Финансы и Статистика" (Finance and statistics) section: Транспорт и связь" (Transport and communications). online
- Плакс, А.В. & Пупынин, В.Н., "Электрические железные дороги" (Electric Railways), Москва, Транспорт, 1993.
- Постановление Совмина СССР от 11 October 1990 N 1001: О Программе технического перевооружения и модернизации железных дорог СССР в 1991–2000 годах (Resolution of the Council of Ministers of the USSR of 11/10/1990 (#1001): Program of reequipping and modernization of USSR railroads in 1991–2000) .
- Резер, С.М., "Взаимодействие транспортных систем" (Coordination of the transportation system), Москва, Наука, 1985 (textbook).
- Сергеева, В.И. ed. "Эстетика на железнодорожном транспорте" (Esthetics in railway transport) Moscow, Транспорт 1977.
- Тихомирова, И.Г. "Интенсификация использования подвижного состава и перевозочной мощности железных дорог" (Intense utilization of rolling stock and the transport capacity of railroads), Москва, Транспорт, 1977.
- "Транспорт и связь СССР (Статистический сборник)" (Transport and communications statistics). Москва: Финансы и статистика (Finance and statistics). Issued in 1957, 1972, 1990. online
- Фед=Федеральная служба государственной статистики (Federal government statistical service) "Транспорт в России" (Transportation in Russia) (annual) Available online
- Филиппов, М.М. (editor), "Железные Дороги, Общий Курс" (Railways, Basic Course) Москва, Транспорт, 3rd ed. 1981 (textbook). (Exists 4th ed. 1991 with new editor: Уздин, М.М.)
- Шадур, Л.А. ed., Багоны: конструкция, теопия и расчёт (Railway cars: construction, theory and calculations), Москва, Транспорт, 1980 (textbook).
- Шафиркин, Б.И, "Единая Транспортная Система СССР и взаимодействие различных видов транспорта" (Unified transportation system of the USSR and intermodal coordination), Москва, Высшая школа, 1983 (textbook).
- Хомич, А.З., Тупицын О.И., Симсон А.Э "Экономия томлива и теплотехническая модернизачия темпловозов" (Fuel economy and thermodynamic modernization of the diesel locomotive) 1975. New edition title: "Томливая еффективость и вспмогательные режемы терловозных дизелей" (Fuel efficiency and non-nominal modes of operation of the diesel engine of locomotives) 1987. Publisher: Moscow, Транспорт.
