= Ivan Kovalev (politician) =

Soviet lieutenant general and politician (1901–1993)

- Иван Ковалёв

People's Commissar of Communication Routes of the Soviet Union
- In office December 20, 1944 – March 15, 1946
- Prime Minister: Joseph Stalin
- Preceded by: Lazar Kaganovich
- Succeeded by: Office abolished Himself as Minister of Communication Routes of the Soviet Union

Minister of Communication Routes of the Soviet Union
- In office March 19, 1946 – June 5, 1948
- Prime Minister: Joseph Stalin
- Preceded by: Office established Himself as People's Commissar of Communication Routes of the Soviet Union
- Succeeded by: Boris Beschev

Personal details
- Born: June 28, 1901 Belogorye, Russian Empire
- Died: May 28, 1993 (aged 91) Moscow, Russia
- Resting place: Troyekurovskoye Cemetery, Moscow
- Party: All–Union Communist Party (Bolsheviks) (from 1922)
- Education: Military Transport Academy of the Workers' and Peasants' Red Army
- Occupation: Institute of World Economy and International Relations of the Russian Academy of Sciences
- Portfolio: Doctor of Military Sciences (1967) professor (1969)
- Awards: Orders: Order of Lenin; Order of the October Revolution; Order of the Red Banner; Order of Suvorov; Order of Kutuzov; Order of the Red Banner of Labour; Order of the Patriotic War; Order of the Red Star; Medals: Medal "For Labour Valour"; Medal "In Commemoration of the 100th Anniversary of the Birth of Vladimir Ilyich Lenin"; Medal "For the Defence of Leningrad"; Medal "For the Defence of Moscow"; Medal "For the Defence of Stalingrad"; Medal "For Victory Over Germany in the Great Patriotic War of 1941–1945"; Jubilee Medal "Twenty Years of Victory in the Great Patriotic War of 1941–1945"; Jubilee Medal "Thirty Years of Victory in the Great Patriotic War of 1941–1945"; Jubilee Medal "Forty Years of Victory in the Great Patriotic War of 1941–1945"; Medal "For the Victory over Japan"; Medal "For Valiant Labour in the Great Patriotic War of 1941–1945"; Medal "Veteran of the Armed Forces of the Soviet Union"; Jubilee Medal "XX Years of the Workers' and Peasants' Red Army"; Jubilee Medal "30 Years of the Soviet Army and Navy"; Jubilee Medal "40 Years of the Armed Forces of the Soviet Union"; Jubilee Medal "50 Years of the Armed Forces of the Soviet Union"; Jubilee Medal "60 Years of the Armed Forces of the Soviet Union"; Jubilee Medal "70 Years of the Armed Forces of the Soviet Union"; Medal "In Commemoration of the 800th Anniversary of Moscow"; Medal "In Commemoration of the 250th Anniversary of Leningrad"
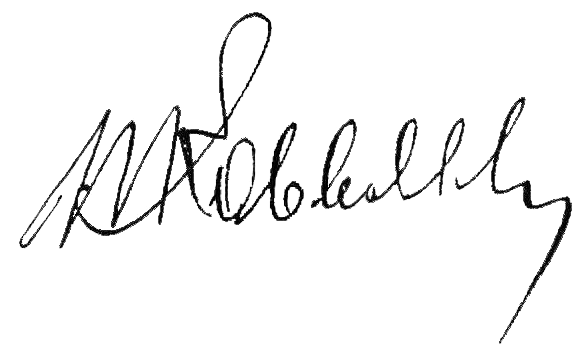
- Signature

Military service
- Allegiance: Soviet Union
- Years of service: 1919–1969
- Rank: Lieutenant general
- Unit: Railway troops
- Commands: Central Directorate of Military Communications of the Workers' and Peasants' Red Army
- Battles/wars: Great Patriotic War

Ivan Vladimirovich Kovalev (Russian: Иван Владимирович Ковалёв; June 28, 1901 – May 28, 1993) was a Soviet military officer and politician. A lieutenant general of the Technical Troops, he was a deputy of the Supreme Soviet of the Soviet Union from 1946 to 1950.

== Biography ==
Born into a peasant family, until the age of 18, he worked in his father's household. In March 1919, he was drafted into the ranks of the Workers' and Peasants' Red Army.

- 1919–1921 – Scout of the 31st Turkestan Artillery Battalion, Red Army Soldier of the 3rd Battalion of the All–Russian Extraordinary Commission in Voronezh;
- 1921–1922 – Cadet of the Voronezh Military Railway School of Technicians;
- 1922–1923 – Reserve Agent, Assistant to the Station Chief of the 10th Railway Regiment, then a battalion of the Caucasian Army;
- 1923–1925 – Political Leader of a company in the 13th Voronezh Railway Battalion, then in the 7th Michurinsky Railway Regiment;
- 1925–1926 – Student of the Advanced Training Courses for Command Personnel in Leningrad;
- 1926–1930 – Platoon Commander, Commander and Political Leader of a company of the 7th Railway Regiment;
- 1930–1935 – Student at the Military Transport Academy of the Workers' and Peasants' Red Army;
- 1935–1936 – Senior Inspector of the People's Commissariat of Communication Routes of the Soviet Union;
- 1936–1937 – Head of the Control and Inspection Group at the Administration of the Moscow–Belarusian–Baltic, then South Ural Railways;
- 1937–1939 – Road Inspector for Traffic Safety on the Omsk Railway, then Head of the Western Railway Department;
- 1939–1941 – Head of the Central Military Department, member of the Board of the People's Commissariat of Communication Routes of the Soviet Union;
- May–July 1941 – Deputy People's Commissar of State Control of the Soviet Union for Railway Transport;
- 8 July 1941 – 1944 – Head of the Office of Military Communications of the Workers' and Peasants' Red Army (from January 1943 – of the Central Office of Military Communications of the Workers' and Peasants' Red Army). Also, since 1942, he was a member of the Transport Committee under the State Defense Committee of the Soviet Union.
- 20 December 1944 – 1948 – People's Commissar (Minister) of Communication Routes of the Soviet Union. Participated in the work of the Potsdam Conference.
- 1948–1950 – Chief Adviser to the Central Committee of the Chinese Communist Party – the head of Soviet military specialists in China;
- 1950–1951 – Head of the Donetsk District of Railways;
- 1951–1957 – Deputy Minister of the Coal Industry of the Soviet Union;
- 1957–1960 – Senior Researcher of the Military Scientific Directorate of the General Staff of the Armed Forces of the Soviet Union;
- 1960–1969 – Senior Lecturer at the Military Academy of the General Staff;
- 1969–1985 – at the Institute of World Economy and International Relations of the Academy of Sciences of the Soviet Union: Senior Researcher, Head of Laboratory, Chief Researcher;
- Since September 1985, he has been a pensioner of the Ministry of Defense of the Soviet Union. During these years, he was a consultant at the Center for Operational–Strategic Research of the General Staff of the Armed Forces of the Soviet Union.

He was buried in Moscow at the Troyekurovskoye Cemetery.

== Remembrance ==
On January 19, 2018, the Ministry of Defense of the Russian Federation established the Lieutenant General Kovalev Medal.

== Awards ==
- 3 Orders of Lenin (1939, March 3, 1942, February 21, 1945);
- Order of the October Revolution;
- 3 Orders of the Red Banner (September 18, 1943, November 3, 1944, ...);
- Order of Suvorov, 1st Class (July 29, 1945);
- Order of Kutuzov, 1st Class (August 3, 1944);
- Order of the Patriotic War, 1st Class (March 11, 1985);
- Order of the Red Star;
- Order of the Red Banner of Labour;
- A number of medals of the Soviet Union.

== Works ==
- Ivan Kovalev. Soviet Railway Transport. 1917–1947 – Moscow: Publishing House and 1st Printing House of the All–Union Publishing and Printing Association of Railway Transport, 1947;
- Ivan Kovalev. Railway Transport in the New Stalinist Five–Year Plan – Moscow: Publishing House and 1st Printing House of the All–Union Publishing and Printing Association of Railway Transport, 1947;
- Ivan Kovalev. Transport in the Decisive Operations of the Great Patriotic War – Moscow: Knowledge, 1969;
- Ivan Kovalev. Rail Transport in the Far East Campaign // Military History Journal – 1975 – No. 9 – Pages 50–54;
- Willful Decisions... [Interview With Ivan Kovalev] // Military History Journal – 1988 – No. 12 – Pages 38–50.

== Sources ==
- State Power of the Soviet Union. The Highest Authorities and Management and Their Leaders. 1923–1991. Historical and Biographical Reference Book / Compiled by Vladimir Ivkin – Moscow, 1999 – ISBN 5-8243-0014-3
- Answers to the Questions of Professor Georgy Kumanev on May 28, 1988
- Georgy Kumanev. Stalin's People's Commissars Speak – Smolensk: Rusich, 2005 – 632 Pages With Illustrations – ISBN 5-8138-0660-1
- Always at the Forefront. Ivan Kovalev Was the First Minister of Communication Routes of the Soviet Union
- Leonid Troitsky. People's Commissar of the Fiery Years – Moscow, 2002 – 239 Pages
