= Sergei Shtemenko =

Soviet army general (1907–1976)

- Сергей Матвеевич Штеменко
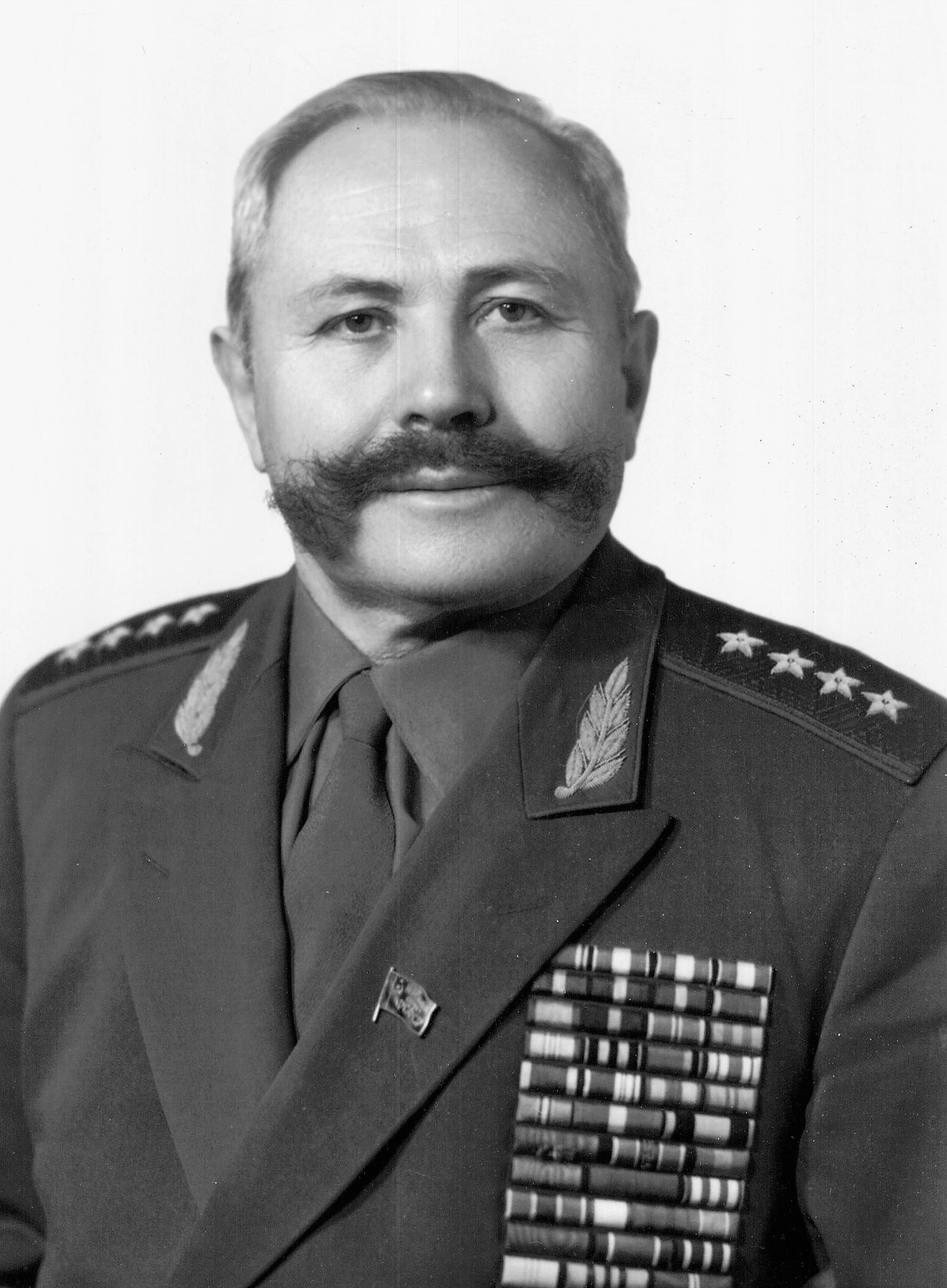
- Born: 20 February [O.S. 7 February] 1907; Uryupinsk, Russian Empire
- Died: 23 April 1976 (aged 69); Moscow, Soviet Union
- Burial place: Novodevichy Cemetery
- Military career
- Allegiance: USSR (1926–1976)
- Service years: 1926–1976
- Rank: Army General
- Commands: Chief of the General Staff
- Conflicts: World War II

Sergei Matveevich Shtemenko (Russian: Сергей Матвеевич Штеменко; 20 February [O.S. 7 February] 1907 – 23 April 1976) was a Soviet general who served as the Chief of the Soviet Armed Forces' General Staff from 1948 to 1952.

== Biography ==
=== Early life ===
Sergei Shtemenko was born to a Cossack family in the village of Uryupinsk. His original surname was Shtemenkov with the suffix "-ov" like other local people, but after the death of his father, his mother changed the surname to Ukrainian style: Shtemenko. Shtemenko volunteered for the Red Army in 1926. In 1930 he joined the All-Union Communist Party (b), and he graduated from the Anti-Aircraft School in Sevastopol in the same year. After several years in the Artillery, he moved to the Armored Corps, completing his studies in the Mechanization and Motorization Academy in 1937. He commanded a tank regiment until September 1938, when he was summoned to the General Staff Academy. In late August 1939, with other cadets, Shtemenko was assigned as a staff officer to the Soviet forces preparing for the Invasion of Poland, and took part in the operation. During the Soviet-Finnish War he served as an assistant in the General Staff. After matriculating from the Academy in the autumn of 1940, Shtemenko's request to be transferred to the new Tank Corps was rejected and he was posted as an aide to General Mikhail Sharokhin, a department chief in the Operations Directorate.

=== World War II ===
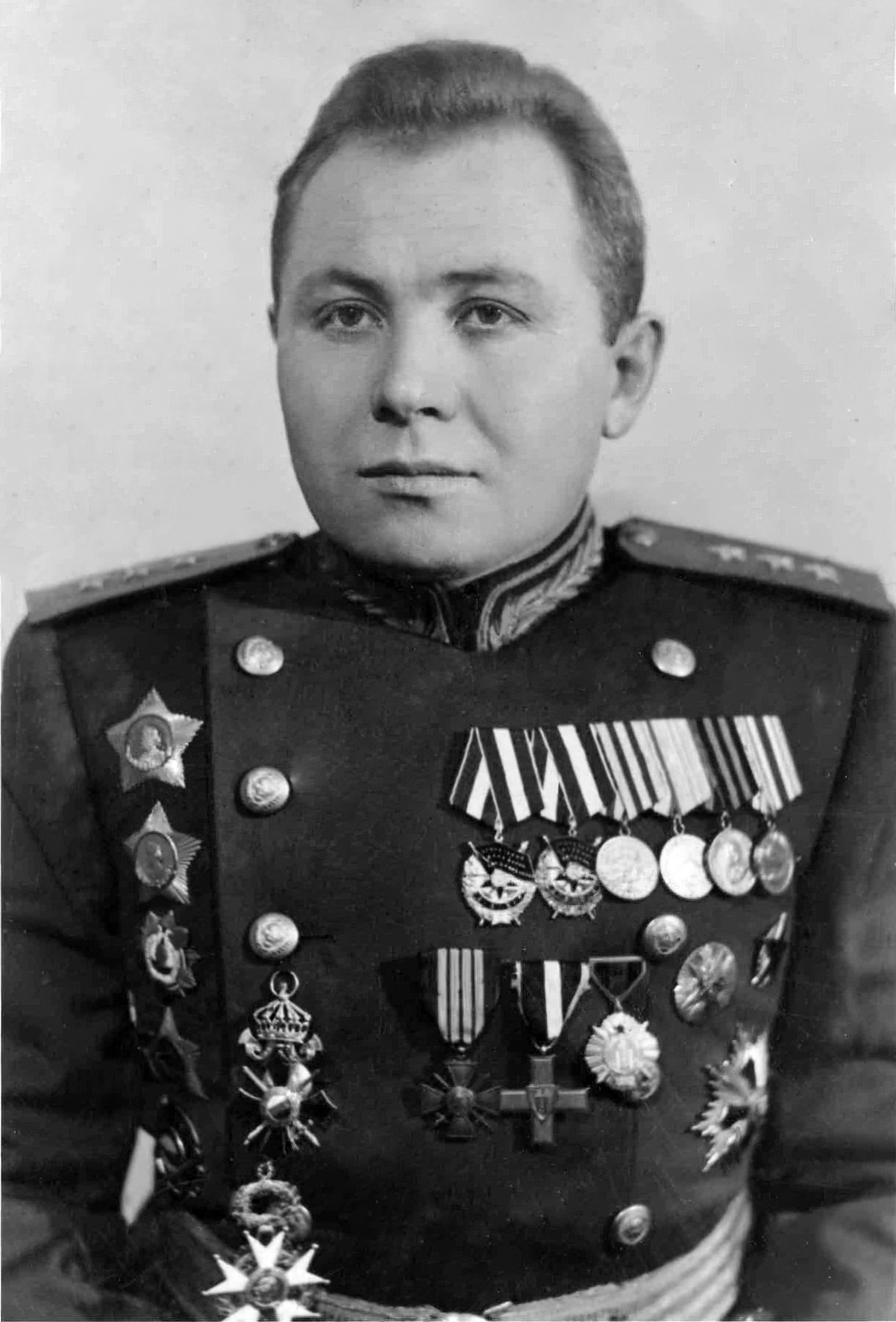
Shtemenko during the Second World War

In August 1941, soon after the German invasion, Shtemenko was appointed as Sharokhin's deputy, an office he held until after the Battle of Moscow, when he was assigned as chief of the Near East department. As such, Shtemenko monitored the conditions of the Soviet troops stationed in the recently occupied Iran. In June 1942, he replaced Sharokhin as the department chief. Shtemenko took part in the operational planning of the Battles for Crimea, the Caucasus and Stalingrad. In May 1943, he was promoted to be the chief of the Operations Directorate, serving directly under Marshal Alexander Vasilevsky. In November of that year he escorted Stalin to the Tehran Conference.

During February and March 1944, Shtemenko served as the Stavka representative in the 2nd Baltic Front during the campaign to relieve the Siege of Leningrad. During the spring of 1944, he toured between the different fronts fighting in Belarus and coordinated their operations.

After the German surrender, Shtemenko was among the organizers of the Victory Parade. In August 1945, he took part in the planning of the Soviet–Japanese War.

=== Post-war career ===
In April 1946 Shtemenko was promoted to the position of Deputy Chief of the General Staff. In November 1948, the 41-year-old Shtemenko was made the Chief of the General Staff and a Deputy Minister of Defence. However, in June 1952 he was replaced as Chief of the General Staff by Vasily Sokolovsky. Shtemenko was then transferred to command the Group of Soviet Forces in Germany. In 1953 Shtemenko was listed as an intended victim of the Doctors' Plot. He continued to serve in the General Staff as deputy chief, and was made a candidate member of the Central Committee, a position he held until 1956.

In June 1953 he was dismissed from the General Staff and demoted to Lieutenant General, after being accused of being an associate of Beria. In 1956 Zhukov appointed him Chief of Military Intelligence and promoted him to Colonel General. However, Shtemenko again fell out of grace after Zhukov was removed as Defense Minister, and was demoted again to Lieutenant General in 1957. He was appointed to the position of deputy commander of the Volga Military District.

Shtemenko slowly regained his status. In June 1962 he was appointed Chief of Staff of the Ground Forces, and in April 1964 he became Chief of the Main Organizational-Mobilization Department of the General Staff. On 6 August 1968 he was promoted to be the Chief of Combined Staff of the Warsaw Pact under the Pact's forces Supreme Commander Marshal Ivan Yakubovsky, and granted the rank of Army General once more. His promotion was part of the preparations for the Warsaw Pact invasion of Czechoslovakia, which began two weeks later.

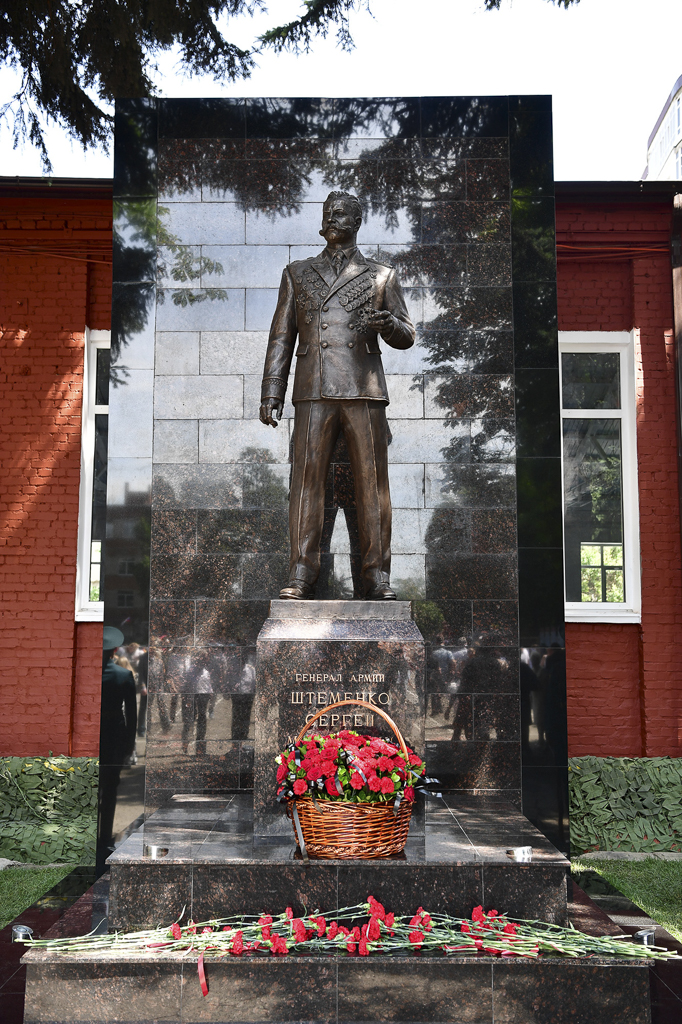
Monument to General Shtemenko

Shtemenko died in Moscow in 1976. On 10 February 1977, on the 70th anniversary of his birth and 10 months after his death, the Krasnodar Red Banner Military Academy was renamed after him.

== Honours and awards ==
- Order of Lenin
- Order of the Red Banner, three times
- Order of Suvorov, 1st class, twice; 2nd class
- Order of Kutuzov, 1st class
- Order of the Red Banner of Labour
- Order of the Red Star
- Order for Service to the Homeland in the Armed Forces of the USSR, 3rd class
- Jubilee Medal "In Commemoration of the 100th Anniversary since the Birth of Vladimir Il'ich Lenin"
- Medal "For the Defence of Moscow"
- Medal "For the Victory over Germany in the Great Patriotic War 1941–1945"
- Jubilee Medal "Twenty Years of Victory in the Great Patriotic War 1941-1945"
- Jubilee Medal "Thirty Years of Victory in the Great Patriotic War 1941-1945"
- Medal "For the Victory over Japan"
- Jubilee Medal "30 Years of the Soviet Army and Navy"
- Jubilee Medal "40 Years of the Armed Forces of the USSR"
- Jubilee Medal "50 Years of the Armed Forces of the USSR"

== Books ==
- The New Laws and Military Service, Moscow, 1968.
- Our Universal Military Commitment, Moscow, 1968.
- The General Staff in the War Years, Moscow, 1968–73.
- The Last Six Months of WWII, Moscow, 1973.
- The Liberating Role of the Soviet Armed Forces, Moscow, 1975.

Military offices
| Preceded by Aleksandr Vasilevsky | Chief of the General Staff of the Armed Forces of the Soviet Union; November 1948 – June 1952 | Succeeded by Vasily Sokolovsky |
