= Chief of Combined Staff of the Unified Armed Forces of the Warsaw Treaty Organization =

Soviet military post from 1955 to 1991

- Начальник Объединенного штаба Объединенных вооруженных сил стран-участниц Варшавского договора

- Longest serving Army General Anatoly Gribkov; 23 April 1976 – 24 January 1989
- General Staff
- Member of: Warsaw Pact; General Staff
- Reports to: Supreme Commander of the Unified Armed Forces
- Seat: Moscow, Soviet Union
- Formation: 14 May 1955; 71 years ago
- First holder: Aleksei Antonov
- Final holder: Vladimir Lobov
- Abolished: 1 July 1991; 35 years ago

The Chief of Combined Staff of the Unified Armed Forces of the Warsaw Treaty Organization (Russian: Начальник Объединенного штаба Объединенных вооруженных сил стран-участниц Варшавского договора) was a post in command of Combined Staff of the military forces of the Warsaw Pact. Furthermore, the Chief of Combined Staff was also a First Deputy Chief of the General Staff of the Armed Forces of the Soviet Union. The post, which was instituted in 1955 and abolished in 1991, was always held by a Soviet military officer.

== List of officeholders ==
No.	Portrait	Supreme Commander of the Unified Armed Forces	Took office	Left office	Time in office	Defence branch	Ref.
1	Aleksei Antonov	Army General; Aleksei Antonov (1896–1962)	14 May 1955	16 June 1962 †	7 years, 33 days	Soviet Army	
2	Pavel Batov	Army General; Pavel Batov (1897–1985)	16 June 1962	October 1965	3 years, 3 months	Soviet Army	
3	Mikhail Kazakov	Army General; Mikhail Kazakov (1901–1979)	October 1965	August 1968	2 years, 10 months	Soviet Army	
4	Sergei Shtemenko	Army General; Sergei Shtemenko (1907–1976)	August 1968	23 April 1976 †	7 years, 8 months	Soviet Army	
5	Anatoly Gribkov	Army General; Anatoly Gribkov (1919–2008)	23 April 1976	24 January 1989	12 years, 276 days	Soviet Army	–
6	Vladimir Lobov	Army General; Vladimir Lobov (born 1935) (Note: Afterwards served as the Chief of the General Staff of the Soviet Union in 1991)	24 January 1989	1 July 1991	2 years, 158 days	Soviet Army	–

== See also ==
- Deputy Supreme Allied Commander Europe – NATO counterpart
- Supreme Commander of the Unified Armed Forces of the Warsaw Treaty Organization
