= Viktor Kulikov =

Soviet marshal (1921–2013)

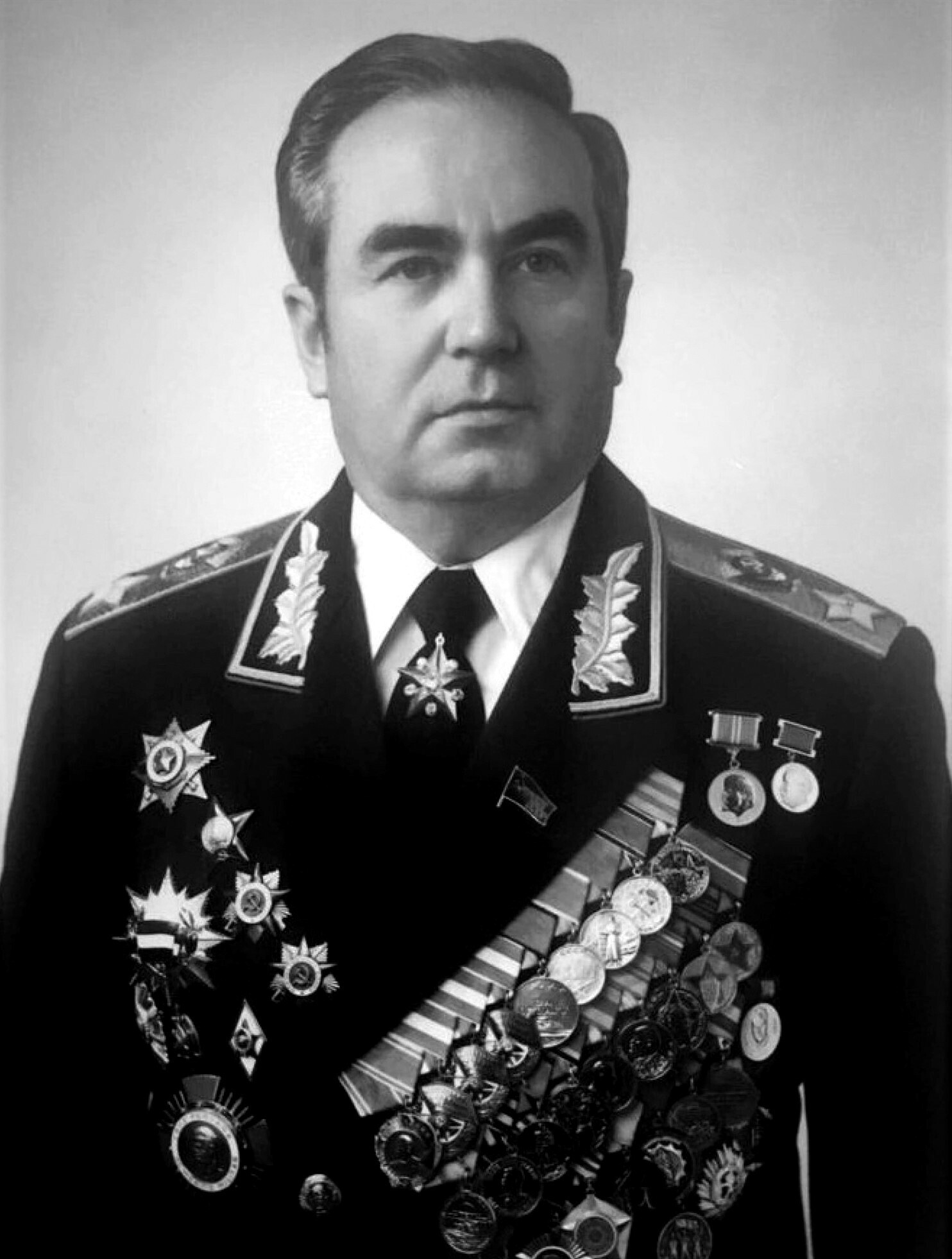
- Kulikov c. 1977
- Born: Виктор Георгиевич Куликов; Viktor Georgiyevich Kulikov; 5 July 1921; Verkhnyaya Lyubovsha village, Oryol Oblast, Russian SFSR
- Died: 28 May 2013 (aged 91); Moscow, Russia
- Military career
- Allegiance: Soviet Union
- Service years: 1939–1989
- Rank: Marshal of the Soviet Union (1977–1989)
- Conflicts: World War II
- Awards: Hero of the Soviet Union

Viktor Georgiyevich Kulikov (Russian: Виктор Георгиевич Куликов; 5 July 1921 – 28 May 2013) was the Warsaw Pact commander-in-chief from 1977 to 1989. He was awarded the rank of the Marshal of the Soviet Union on 14 January 1977.

== Early life and career ==
Kulikov was born into a peasant family in Oryol Oblast in 1921. The family fled to the south due to hunger and ended up in Stavropol. In 1938, he completed 10th grade at the fifth railway school in Nevinnomyssk. He joined the Red Army in 1939. He saw service in World War II and was made a Hero of the Soviet Union. He studied at the Grozny Military Infantry School, graduating as a lieutenant in June 1941.

== Post-war service ==
From October 1945, he was Deputy Commander of the 3rd Guards Tank Regiment in the 3rd Guards Tank Division of the Northern Group of Forces in Poland. In 1947, he graduated from the Leningrad Higher Officer School of Armored and Mechanized Troops, then served in the headquarters of tank regiments in the Belorussian Military District and in the Turkestan Military District.

Kulikov graduated from the Frunze Military Academy in 1953. Following his graduation, he served as commander of the 155th Mechanized Regiment, later becoming chief of staff. In July 1955, he was appointed commander of the 69th Mechanized Division in the Odessa Military District. From May 1957, he commanded the 118th Motorized Rifle Division.

He went on to graduate from the Military Academy of the General Staff of the Armed Forces of the USSR in 1959. From November 1959 to March 1961, Kulikov served as Deputy Commander for Combat Training and Head of the Combat Training Department of the 5th Guards Tank Army in the Belorussian Military District. In 1961–1962, he was assigned to the Republic of Ghana as a senior member of a Soviet military advisory group providing technical assistance to the Ghanaian Armed Forces.

In February 1962, he became First Deputy Commander of the 6th Army in the Leningrad Military District, and on June 8, 1964, he was appointed commander of the 6th Combined Arms Red Banner Army, headquartered in Petrozavodsk, Karelian ASSR. He later served as commander of the 2nd Guards Tank Army within the Group of Soviet Forces in Germany.

From 1967 to 1969, Kulikov commanded the Kyiv Military District, and from 1969 to 1971, he led the Group of Soviet Forces in Germany. On September 21, 1971, he was appointed Chief of the General Staff of the Armed Forces of the USSR and First Deputy Minister of Defense, a position he held until January 8, 1977.

He was a member of the Central Committee of the Communist Party of the Soviet Union (CPSU) from April 9, 1971 to April 25, 1989.

From January 1977 to February 1989, Kulikov served as Supreme Commander of the Unified Armed Forces of the Warsaw Treaty Organization and concurrently as First Deputy Minister of Defense. In 1983, he was awarded the Lenin Prize.

Between February 1989 and January 1992, he held the position of Inspector General in the Group of Inspectors General of the Ministry of Defense. Beginning in January 1992, he served as an advisor to the Commander-in-Chief of the United Armed Forces of the Commonwealth of Independent States, Marshal Yevgeny Shaposhnikov.

Kulikov was elected as a Deputy of the Soviet of Nationalities (1966–1989), representing the Armenian Soviet Socialist Republic, and later served as a People's Deputy in the Congress of People's Deputies from 1989 to 1991.

== Retirement and later life ==
Retired in 1992 and in May became an advisor to the Minister of Defense Pavel Grachev He was a Deputy of the State Duma for United Russia in its 3rd convocation from 1999-2003, serving Chairman of the State Duma Committee on Veterans' Affairs). He inspected and took the salute at the 1995 Moscow Victory Day Parade of veterans on Red Square. He was awarded the highest Cuban award, the Order of Playa Girón in 2006. Kulikov died after a long illness, on 28 May 2013. Kulikov was buried on May 31, 2013 at the Novodevichy Cemetery, next to his wife Maria Maksimovna.

== Personal life ==
His wife, Maria Maksimovna Kulikova (1922-2011), fought in the Great Patriotic War with her husband and was a surgical nurse. He has two daughters: Valentina and Lydia.

== Honours and awards ==
USSR and Russia

- Hero of the Soviet Union (3 July 1981)
- Order of Merit for the Fatherland;
  - 2nd class II degrees (10 July 2001) - for outstanding contribution to strengthening national defence and an active law-making
  - 3rd class (3 July 1996) - for services to the state and personal contribution to the development and reform of the Armed Forces of the Russian Federation
  - 4th class (23 June 2011) - a contribution to strengthening national defence and long-term public activities
- Order of Military Merit
- Order of Honour (5 July 2006) - for services to strengthen national defence and a lot of work on patriotic education of young people
- Four Orders of Lenin (2 July 1971, 21 February 1978, 3 July 1981 and 19 February 1988)
- Order of the Red Banner, three times (26 October 1943, 20 July 1944 and 22 February 1968)
- Order of the Patriotic War, 1st class, three times (7 September 1943, 12 May 1945 and 6 April 1985)
- Order of the Red Star (26 October 1955)
- Order for Service to the Homeland in the Armed Forces of the USSR, 3rd class (30 April 1975)
- Medal For Courage
- Medal for Combat Service
- Lenin Prize (1983)
- An individual weapon - a gun (on retirement in 1992)

Foreign awards

- Order of Sukhbaatar (Mongolia, 1981)
- Patriotic Order of Merit, 1st class (GDR, 1981)
- Star of People's Friendship, 1st class (GDR, 1985)
- Scharnhorst Order, three times (GDR, 1972, 1986, 1987)
- Order "For Service to the Motherland and the people", 1st class (GDR, 1970)
- Order of Georgi Dimitrov (Bulgaria, 1984)
- Order of the People's Republic of Bulgaria, 1st class (1974)
- Commander's Cross with Star of the Order of Polonia Restituta (Poland, 1973)
- Order of the Red Banner (Hungary, 1975)
- Order of the Red Star (Hungary, 1985)
- Order "For Military Valour", 1st class (NRW, 1983)
- Order of the Victorious February (Czechoslovakia, 1985)
- Order "For Military Merit", 1st class (Peru, 1972)
- Order "On 23 August", 1st class (CPP, 1974)

Military offices
Preceded by Matvei Zakharov	Chief of the General Staff of the Armed Forces of the Soviet Union; September 1971 – 7 January 1977	Succeeded by Nikolai Ogarkov
Preceded by Ivan Yakubovsky	Supreme Commander of the Unified Armed Forces of the Warsaw Treaty Organization; 1977–1989	Succeeded by Pyotr Lushev
