= Ivan Yakubovsky =

Soviet Army marshal (1912–1976)

- Іван Якубоўскі, Иван Якубовский
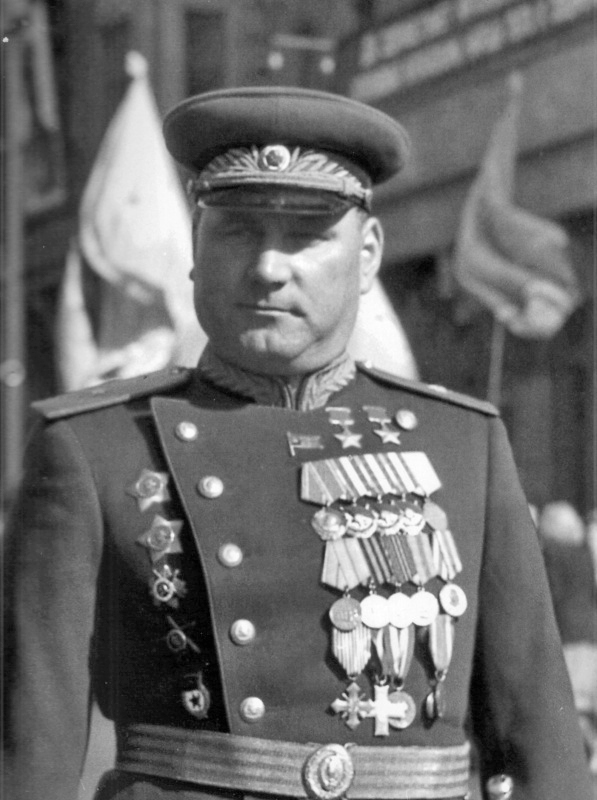
- Yakubovsky in 1945
- Born: 7 January 1912; Zaitsava, Russian Empire
- Died: 30 November 1976 (aged 64); Moscow, Soviet Union
- Burial place: Kremlin Wall Necropolis
- Military career
- Allegiance: Soviet Union; Warsaw Pact
- Branch: Soviet Army
- Service years: 1932–1976
- Rank: Marshal of the Soviet Union (1967–1976)
- Commands: 91st Separate Tank Brigade; Soviet Forces Germany; Kiev Military District; Allied Forces of the Warsaw Pact
- Conflicts: World War II
- Awards: Hero of the Soviet Union (twice)

Signature
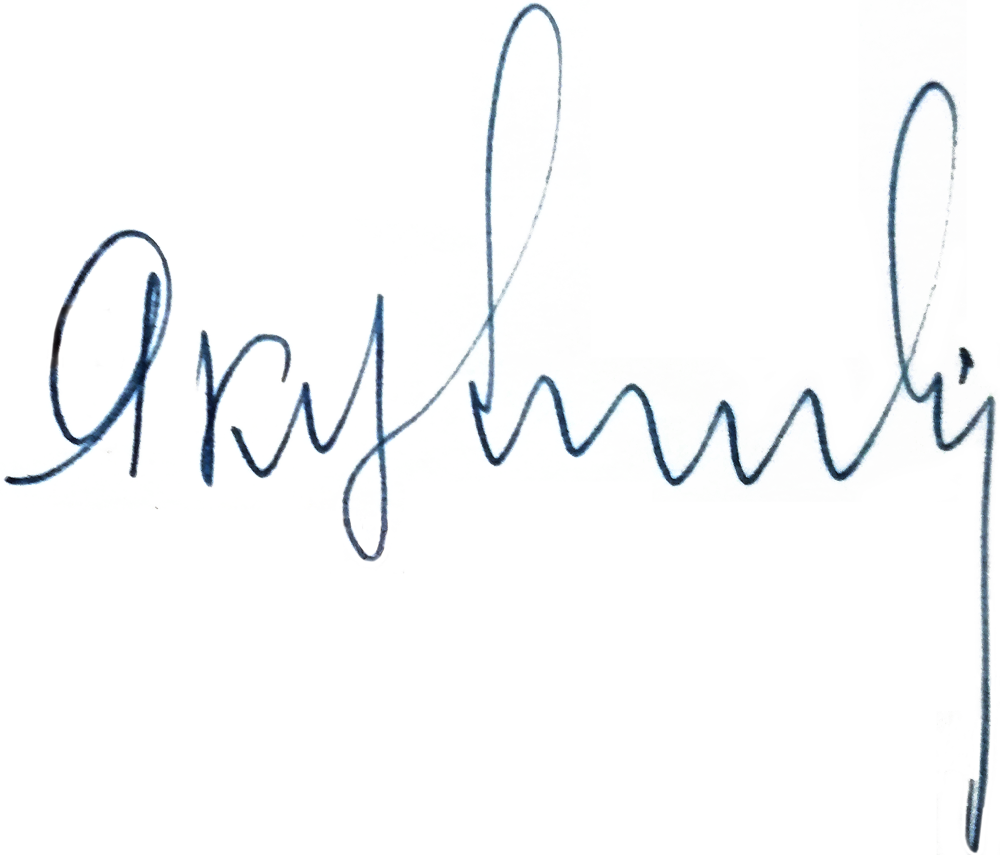

Ivan Ignatyevich Yakubovsky (Belarusian: Іван Ігнатавіч Якубоўскі, romanized: Ivan Ihnatavič Jakuboŭski, Russian: Ива́н Игна́тьевич Якубо́вский; 7 January 1912 – 30 November 1976) was a military officer in the Soviet Army during the Cold War. He was a Marshal of the Soviet Union, twice made a Hero of the Soviet Union, and served as commander-in-chief of the Warsaw Pact from 1967 to 1976.

== Life ==
=== Early life ===
Born as the sixth child of a peasant family of Belarusian ethnicity in the Mogilev Governorate of the Russian Empire (present-day Belarus), he was employed in their village and graduated from a rural school. From 1930 he worked as section-secretary on the Makaryevsky village council, then at a plant. He graduated from two courses at the Orsha School in 1932.

=== Military service ===
==== Pre-war ====
Enlisting in the Red Army in 1932, he graduated from the Mikhail Kalinin Belarusian Association Military School in Minsk in 1934, aiming to serve as a training platoon commander in the 27th Omsk Red Banner Rifle Division (Vitebsk).

In 1935 he graduated from training courses in Leningrad, before serving in the Belorussian Military District as a platoon commander, company commander, battalion chief of staff and training battalion commander of various armoured units. Commanding a tank company in the Red Army's September 1939 Polish campaign as part of the troops on the Belorussian front, he also served in the 1939–40 Winter War.

==== World War II ====
Yakubovsky entered the war in its early days on the western border as commander of a tank battalion, fighting heroically in the most difficult defensive battles in Belarus. His unit was one of the last defenders of a doomed Minsk, crushing an advanced enemy motorcycle convoy with their tanks in the city streets. From January 1942 he commanded a tank regiment of the 121st Tank Brigade on the USSR's western front, becoming Deputy Commander of the 121st Tank Brigade (January 1942) then Commander (March 1942) of the 91st Tank Brigade.

He participated in the Barvinkivske-Lozova offensive. He distinguished himself in the defensive battles in the Donets Basin in the summer of 1942 and in the defensive and offensive phases of the Battle of Stalingrad, fighting on the Southern, Southwestern, Stalingrad and Don fronts, and rising to colonel on 30 November 1942.

In spring 1943 the brigade was transferred to the Central Front, joining the 3rd Guards Tank Army, in which he fought right up until VE Day. Commanding the brigade, he fought heroically on the Voronezh, Bryansk, Central, 1st Ukrainian fronts, in the battle of Kursk in the Orel region, in the Battle of the Dnieper and in the liberation of Kiev and Fastiv. For his heroism at Fastiv, where his unit destroyed 30 enemy tanks in a single day, Yakubovsky was awarded the title Hero of the Soviet Union. In spring 1944, at the head of his tank brigade, Col Yakubovsky successfully operated in Proskurovo-Chernivtsi offensive.

In June 1944 he became deputy commander of 6th Guards Tank Corps within 3rd Guards Tank Army. He participated in the Lvov–Sandomierz Offensive, in the battles defending and expanding the Sandomierz bridgehead, in the Vistula–Oder Offensive in January 1945. In these operations, he commanded the advanced corps troops, at their point of impact with the German tank units. For heroic actions in the Lvov-Sandomierz operation Colonel Yakubovsky was again ranked as a Hero of the Soviet Union, by decree of 23 September 1944. From April 1945 he was deputy commander of the 7th Guards Tank Corps within 3rd Guards Tank Army, participating in the Berlin and Prague operations and rising to Major-General of Tank Troops (20 April 1945).

==== Cold War ====
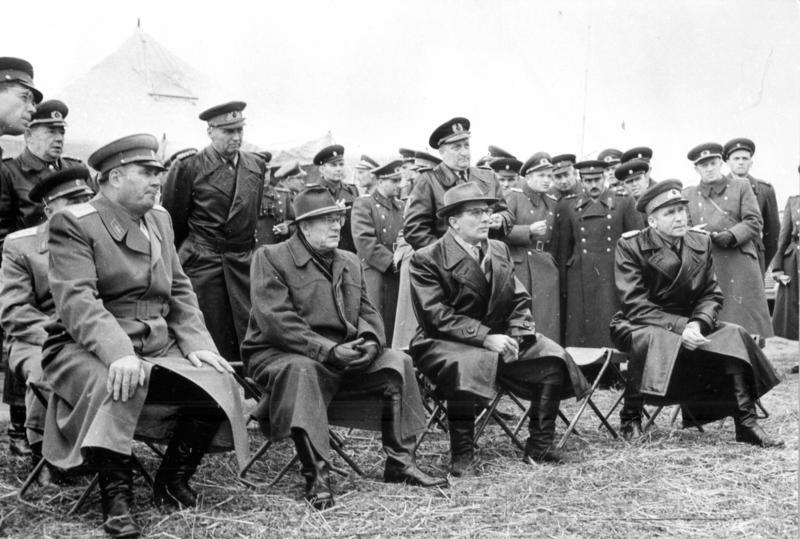
Yakubovsky, far left, with East German politicians and officers, 1960.

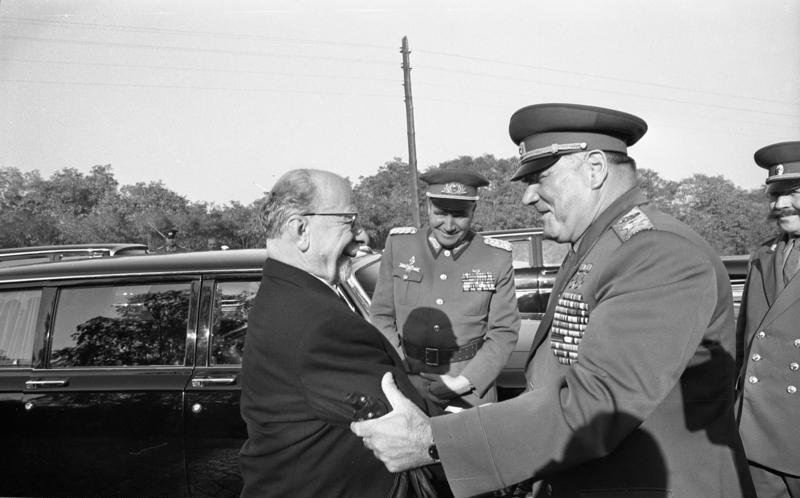
Commander-in-chief of the Warsaw Pact Ivan Yakubovsky with Walter Ulbricht in 1970

After the war, he continued to serve as deputy commander of the tank corps in the Leningrad Military District. In 1948 he graduated from the General Staff Academy. In March 1948 he became Commander of the Armored Division in the Belorussian Military District then in April 1952 became commander of armoured and mechanized forces in the Carpathian Military District. Rising to Lieutenant-General of Tank Forces (3.05.1953), he commanded a Tank Army (December 1953 to April 1957) then a mechanized army (from April 1957).

In July 1957 he became First Deputy Commander of the Group of Soviet Forces in Germany, later being promoted to Colonel-General (18.08.1958). In April 1960 he was appointed Commander of the Group of Soviet Forces in Germany, being in post in the midst of the Berlin Crisis of 1961, when the threat of armed conflict in Europe dramatically escalated.

During the crisis, in August 1961, Ivan Konev, Commander in Chief of the Group of Soviet Forces in Germany, was appointed Marshal of the Soviet Union and Yakubovsky was transferred to the post of his first deputy, while continuing to manage the daily operations of the Group of Soviet Forces in Germany. After stabilizing the situation in April 1962, Army General Yakubovsky returned to the post of Commander of the Group of Soviet Forces in Germany. In January 1965, he was made Commander of the Kiev Military District.

On 12 April 1967 he was made First Deputy Minister of Defense of the USSR (simultaneously with the appointment of Andrei Grechko as Minister of Defense) and Marshal of the Soviet Union. From July 1967, he contiguously held the post of supreme commander of the forces of the Warsaw Pact. In this capacity, he directed military preparations for the Warsaw Pact invasion of Czechoslovakia in August 1968.

=== Death ===
Yakubovsky died of cancer on 30 November 1976 at the age of 64. His ashes were buried at the Kremlin Wall Necropolis.

== Awards ==
Soviet awards

- Twice Hero of the Soviet Union (10 January 1944, 23 September 1944)
- Four Orders of Lenin (10 January 1944, 6 January 1962, 22 February 1968, 6 January 1972)
- Order of the Red Banner, four times (21 July 1942, 14 February 1943, 30 August 1944, 21 August 1953)
- Two awards of the Order of Suvorov, 2nd degree (6 April 1945, 31 May 1945)
- Order of the Patriotic War, 1st class (21 August 1943)
- Order of the Red Star (6 November 1947)
- Order for Service to the Homeland in the Armed Forces of the USSR, 3rd degree (30 April 1975)
- Honorary weapon with the State Emblem of the USSR (22 February 1968)
- Medal for Combat Service
- Jubilee Medal "In Commemoration of the 100th Anniversary since the Birth of Vladimir Il'ich Lenin"
- Medal "For the Defence of Moscow"
- Medal "For the Defence of Stalingrad"
- Medal "For the Victory over Germany in the Great Patriotic War 1941–1945"
- Jubilee Medal "Twenty Years of Victory in the Great Patriotic War 1941-1945"
- Jubilee Medal "Thirty Years of Victory in the Great Patriotic War 1941-1945"
- Medal "For the Capture of Berlin"
- Medal "For the Liberation of Prague"
- Medal "Veteran of the Armed Forces of the USSR"
- Jubilee Medal "30 Years of the Soviet Army and Navy"
- Jubilee Medal "40 Years of the Armed Forces of the USSR"
- Jubilee Medal "50 Years of the Armed Forces of the USSR"

Foreign awards

- Hero of the Czechoslovak Socialist Republic (28 April 1970)
- Order of Klement Gottwald (Czechoslovakia)
- Order of Karl Marx (East Germany, 1970)
- Cross of Grunwald, 1st class (Poland)
- Commander with Star of the Order of Polonia Restituta (Poland)

== Commemorations ==
In 1977, the Kiev Higher Tank Engineering College was named after him. Streets have been named after him in Kiev, Minsk, Fastiv, and his birthplace of Gorki.

== Memoirs ==
- Земля в огне (Earth on fire); Moscow, 1975;
- За прочный мир на земле (For a lasting peace on earth); Moscow, 1975

== Notes ==
Military offices
Preceded by Andrei Grechko	Supreme Commander of the Unified Armed Forces of the Warsaw Treaty Organization; 1967–1976	Succeeded by Viktor Kulikov
