= Jubilee Medal "30 Years of the Soviet Army and Navy" =

Commemorative medal of the Soviet Union

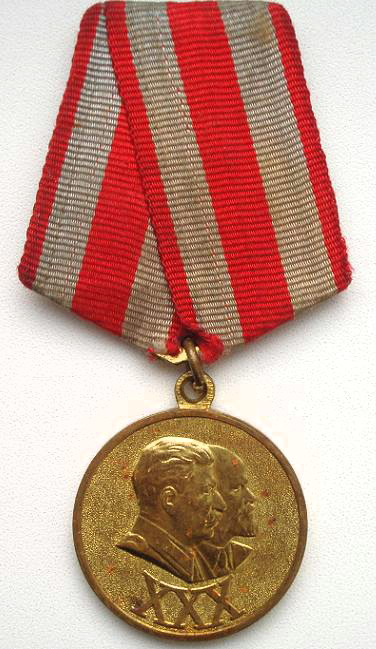
- Jubilee Medal "30 Years of the Soviet Army and Navy" (obverse)
- Type: Jubilee medal
- Awarded for: Military service on February 22, 1948
- Presented by: USSR
- Eligibility: Citizens of the Soviet Union
- Status: No longer awarded
- Established: February 22, 1948

Highlights
- Total: 3,710,920
- Ribbon of the Jubilee Medal "30 Years of the Soviet Army and Navy"

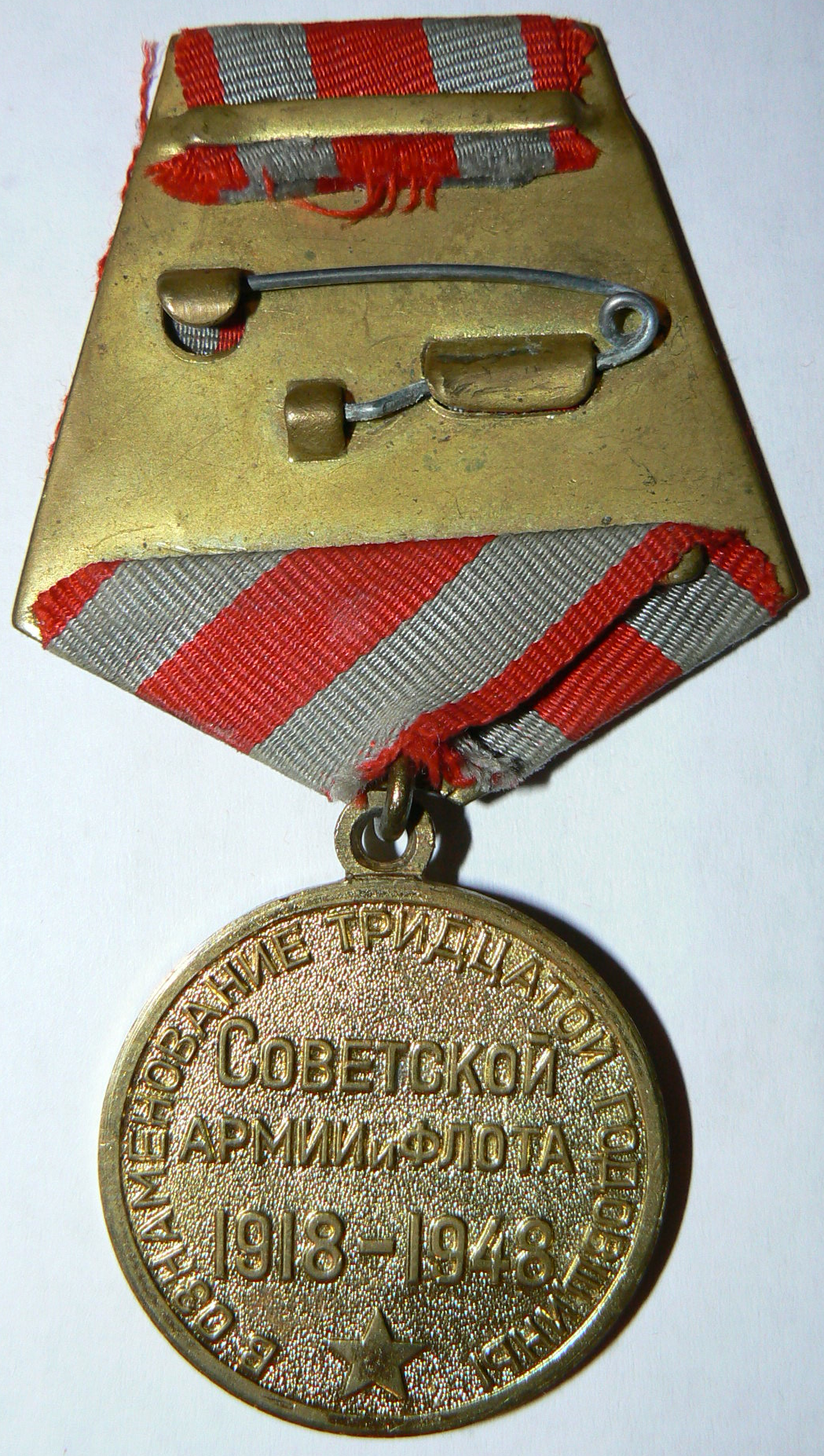
Reverse of the Jubilee Medal "30 Years of the Soviet Army and Navy"

The Jubilee Medal "30 Years of the Soviet Army and Navy" (Russian: Юбилейная медаль «30 лет Советской Армии и Флота») was a state military commemorative medal of the Soviet Union established on February 22, 1948 by decree of the Presidium of the Supreme Soviet of the Soviet Union to denote the thirtieth anniversary of the creation of the Soviet Armed Forces. Its statute was later amended by decree of the Presidium of the Supreme Soviet of the USSR of July 18, 1980.

== Medal statute ==
The Jubilee Medal "30 Years of the Soviet Army and Navy" was awarded to all the generals, admirals, officers, warrant officers, sergeants, petty officers, soldiers and sailors, who were members of the Armed Forces of the USSR, of the troops of the Ministry of Internal Affairs or of the Ministry for State Security on 23 February 1948.

The medal was awarded on behalf of the Presidium of the Supreme Soviet of the USSR by commanders of military units and institutions.

The Jubilee Medal "30 Years of the Soviet Army and Navy" was worn on the left side of the chest and when in the presence of other medals of the USSR, it was located immediately after the Jubilee Medal "XX Years of the Workers' and Peasants' Red Army". If worn in the presence or Orders or medals of the Russian Federation, the latter have precedence.

== Medal description ==
The Jubilee Medal "30 Years of the Soviet Army and Navy" was a 32mm in diameter circular brass medal. On the obverse, the right profile busts of Lenin and Stalin (nearer); at the bottom, the relief Roman numeral "XXX". On the reverse, the circular relief inscription along the entire medal's circumference "TO COMMEMORATE THE THIRTIETH ANNIVERSARY" (Russian: «В ОЗНАМЕНОВАНИЕ ТРИДЦАТОЙ ГОДОВЩИНЫ») separated at the very bottom by a relief five pointed star; in the center, the relief inscription in two rows "SOVIET ARMY AND NAVY" (Russian: «СОВЕТСКОЙ АРМИИ И ФЛОТА») with just below the dates "1918–1948".

The Jubilee Medal "30 Years of the Soviet Army and Navy" was secured by a ring through the medal suspension loop to a standard Soviet pentagonal mount covered by a 24mm wide silk moiré grey ribbon with two 2mm red edge stripes and a central 8mm red stripe.

== Recipients (partial list) ==
All individuals listed below are recipients of the Jubilee Medal "30 Years of the Soviet Army and Navy".

- Army General Semion Pavlovich Ivanov
- Lieutenant General Nikolai Pavlovich Simoniak
- Marshal of Aviation Serhi Gnatovich Rudenko
- Army General Sergei Matveevich Shtemenko
- Captain 3rd grade Michael Petrovich Tsiselsky
- Captain 1st grade Ivan Vasilyevich Travkin
- Lieutenant General Vasily Mikhaylovich Badanov
- Army General Kuzma Nikitovich Galitsky
- Marshal of the Soviet Union Sergey Semyonovich Biryuzov
- Marshal of the Soviet Union Vasily Danilovich Sokolovsky
- Marshal of the Soviet Union Ivan Ignatyevich Yakubovsky
- Marshal of the Soviet Union Vasily Ivanovich Chuikov
- Marshal of the Soviet Union Kliment Yefremovich Voroshilov
- Admiral of the Fleet of the Soviet Union Nikolay Gerasimovich Kuznetsov
- Marshal of the Soviet Union Georgy Konstantinovich Zhukov
- Captain Vasily Grigoryevich Zaytsev
- Marshal of the Soviet Union Semyon Konstantinovich Timoshenko
- Colonel Pavel Ivanovich Belyayev
- Dmitriy Feodorovich Ustinov Marshal of the Soviet Union
- Marshal of Aviation Alexander Ivanovich Pokryshkin
- Admiral Vladimir Filippovich Tributs
- Admiral Filipp Sergeyevich Oktyabrskiy

== See also ==
- Red Army
- Awards and decorations of the Soviet Union
