= Jubilee Medal "Thirty Years of Victory in the Great Patriotic War 1941–1945" =

Commemorative medal of the Soviet Union

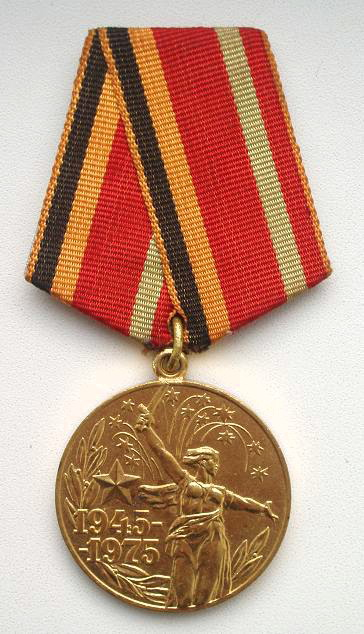
- Jubilee Medal "Thirty Years of Victory in the Great Patriotic War 1941–1945" (obverse)
- Type: Jubilee medal
- Awarded for: Participation in World War II in the Soviet Armed Forces
- Presented by: USSR
- Eligibility: Citizens of the Soviet Union
- Status: No longer awarded
- Established: April 25, 1975

Highlights
- Total: 14,259,560
- Ribbon of the Jubilee Medal "Thirty Years of Victory in the Great Patriotic War 1941–1945"

The Jubilee Medal "Thirty Years of Victory in the Great Patriotic War 1941–1945" (Russian: Юбилейная медаль «Тридцать лет Победы в Великой Отечественной войне 1941–1945 гг.») was a state commemorative medal of the Soviet Union established on April 25, 1975, by decree of the Presidium of the Supreme Soviet of the USSR to denote the thirtieth anniversary of the Soviet victory over Nazi Germany in World War II.

== Medal Statute ==
The Jubilee Medal "Thirty Years of Victory in the Great Patriotic War 1941–1945" was awarded to: all military and civilian personnel of the Armed Forces of the USSR who took part in the Great Patriotic War of 1941 – 1945, to partisans of the Great Patriotic War, to the personnel of the Armed Forces of the USSR, as well as any other persons who were awarded the Medal "For the Victory over Germany in the Great Patriotic War 1941–1945", the Medal "For the Victory over Japan" or the Medal "For Valiant Labour in the Great Patriotic War 1941-1945".

The medal was awarded on behalf of the Presidium of the Supreme Soviet of the USSR by commanders of military units, formations, the heads of agencies, institutions; by republican, territorial, regional, district or municipal military commissariats, the Supreme Council of the Union and autonomous republics, the executive committees of regional, provincial, county, district and municipal Soviets. Each medal came with an attestation of award, this attestation came in the form of a small 8 cm by 11 cm cardboard booklet bearing the award's name, the recipient's particulars and an official stamp and signature on the inside.

The Jubilee Medal "Thirty Years of Victory in the Great Patriotic War 1941–1945" was worn on the left side of the chest and in the presence of other orders and medals of the USSR, was located immediately following the Jubilee Medal "Twenty Years of Victory in the Great Patriotic War 1941-1945". If worn in the presence of orders and medals of the Russian Federation, the latter have precedence.

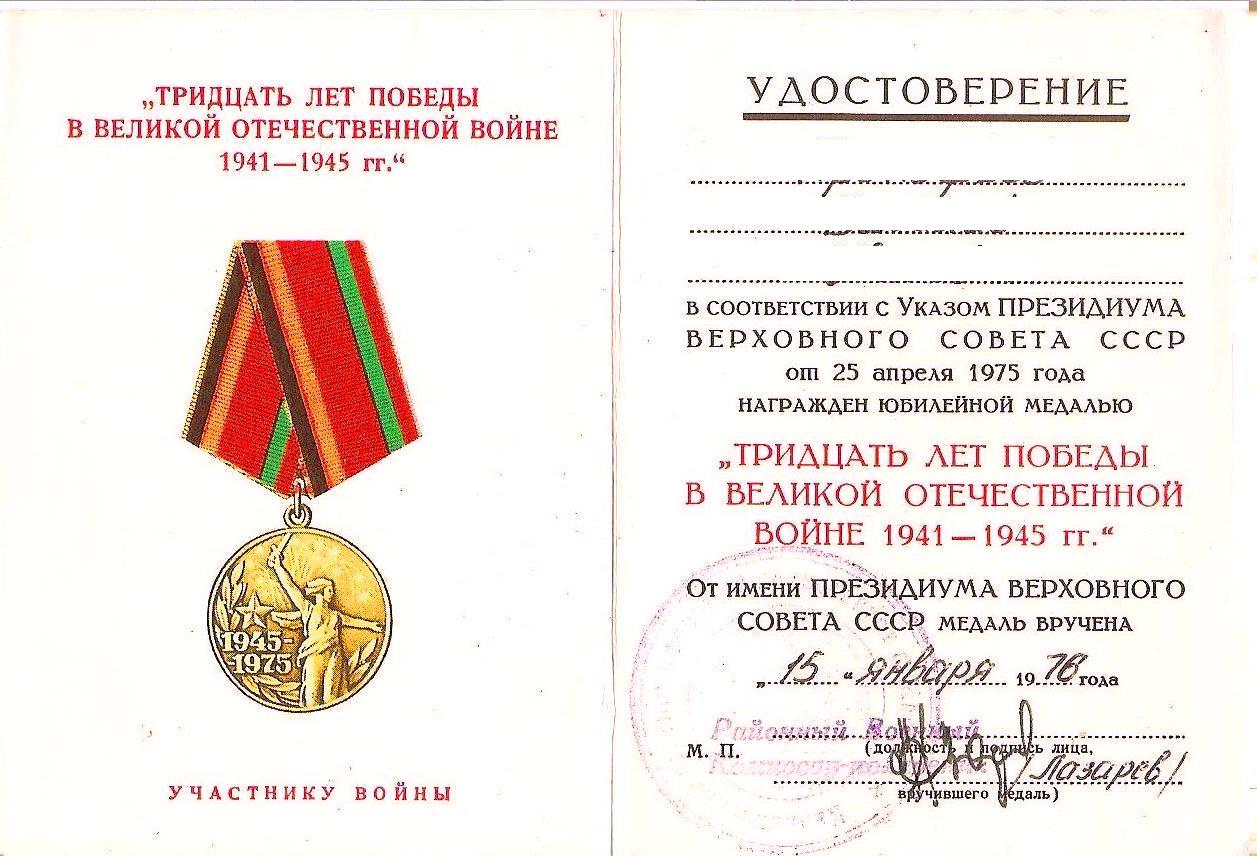
Award attestation document for the Jubilee Medal "Thirty Years of Victory in the Great Patriotic War 1941–1945"

== Medal Description ==
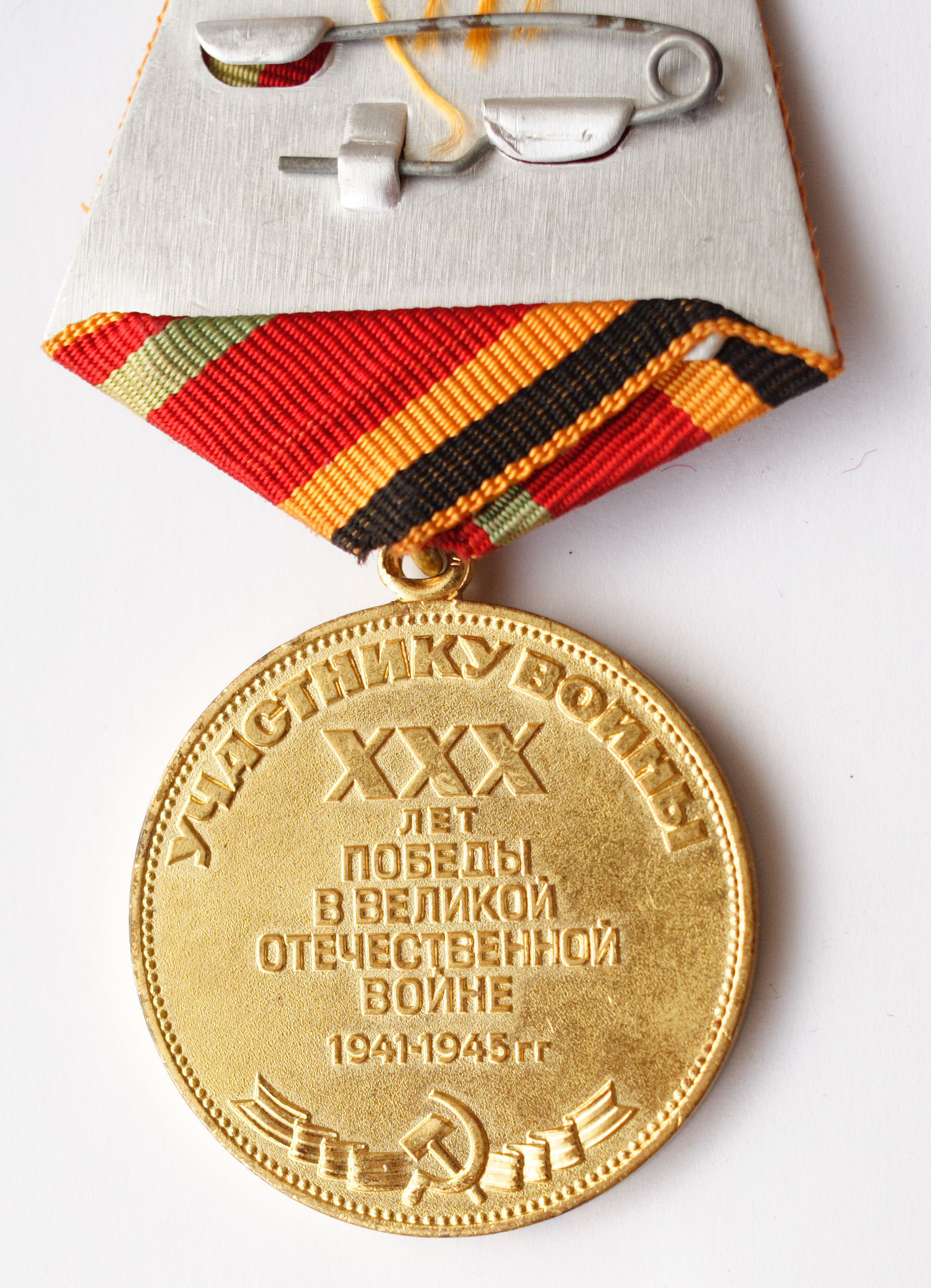
Reverse of the Jubilee Medal "Thirty Years of Victory in the Great Patriotic War 1941–1945"

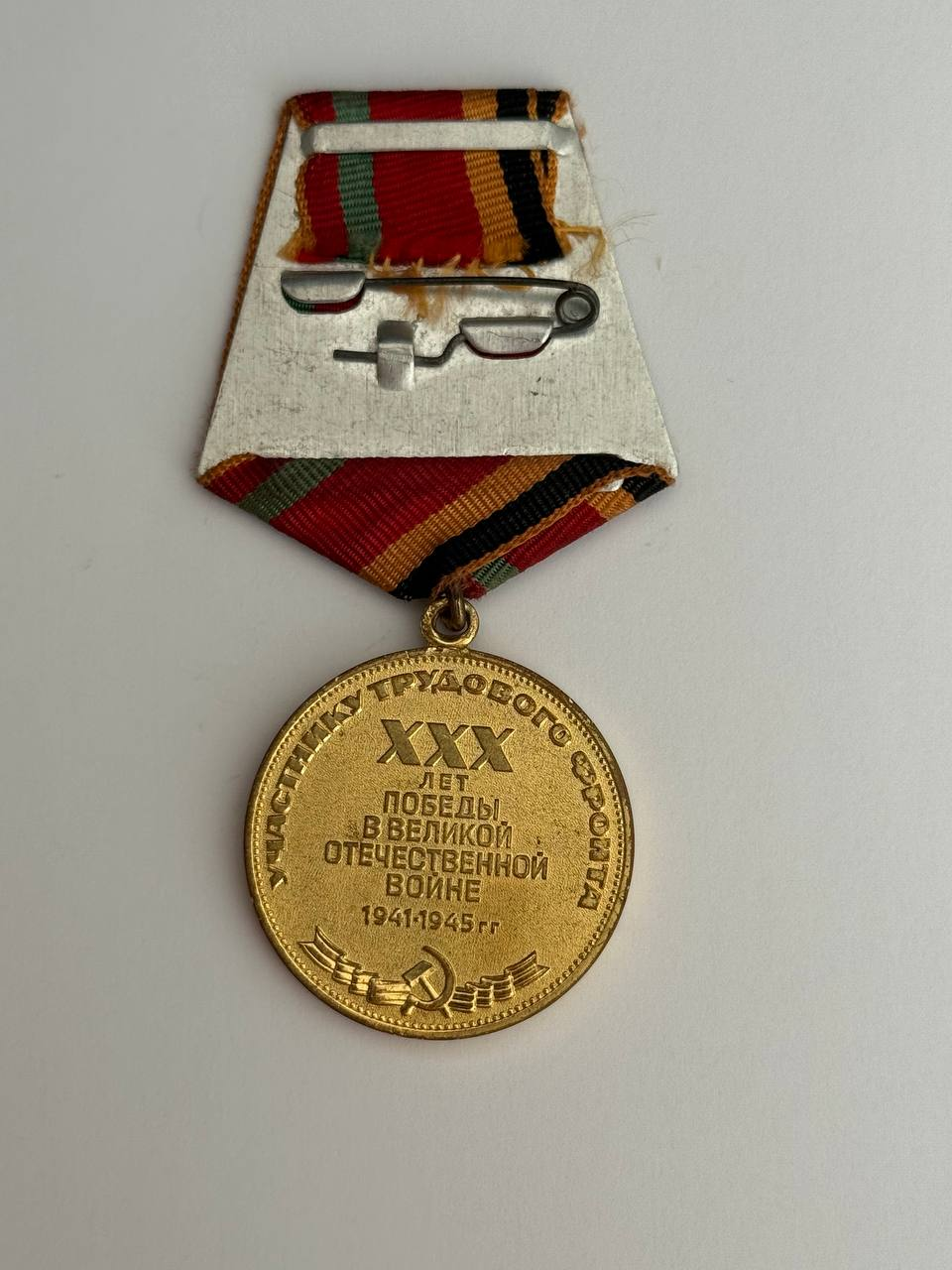
30 Years of Victory Member of the labour front reverse

The Jubilee Medal "Thirty Years of Victory in the Great Patriotic War 1941–1945" was a 36mm in diameter circular brass medal. On the obverse, over a background of fireworks in honour of the Soviet people's victory in World War 2, the relief image of Yevgeny Vuchetich's statue "The Motherland Calls", to the left of the statue, over descending and ascending laurel branches, a five pointed star and the dates "1945–1975". On the reverse along the upper medal circumference the relief inscription "WAR PARTICIPANT" (Russian: «УЧАСТНИКУ ВОЙНЫ») or "PARTICIPANT ON THE LABOUR FRONT" (Russian: «УЧАСТНИКУ ТРУДОВОГО ФРОНТА»), in the center, the relief inscription on seven lines "XXX Years of Victory in the Great Patriotic War of 1941–1945" (Russian: «ХХХ лет Победы в Великой Отечественной войне 1941—1945 гг.»). At the bottom, the relief image of the hammer and sickle over a Ribbon of St George. On the medals struck to honour foreign nationals, the reverse inscriptions "WAR PARTICIPANT" or "PARTICIPANT ON THE LABOUR FRONT" were omitted. Ones with no inscriptions would be awarded to foreign leaders.

The medal was secured to a standard Soviet pentagonal mount by a ring through the medal suspension loop. The mount was covered by a 24mm wide red silk moiré ribbon with 1mm orange edge stripes. On the left side, against the edge stripe, a 3mm black stripe with a 3mm orange stripe. On the right, 3mm from the edge stripe, a 3mm green stripe.

== Recipients (partial list) ==
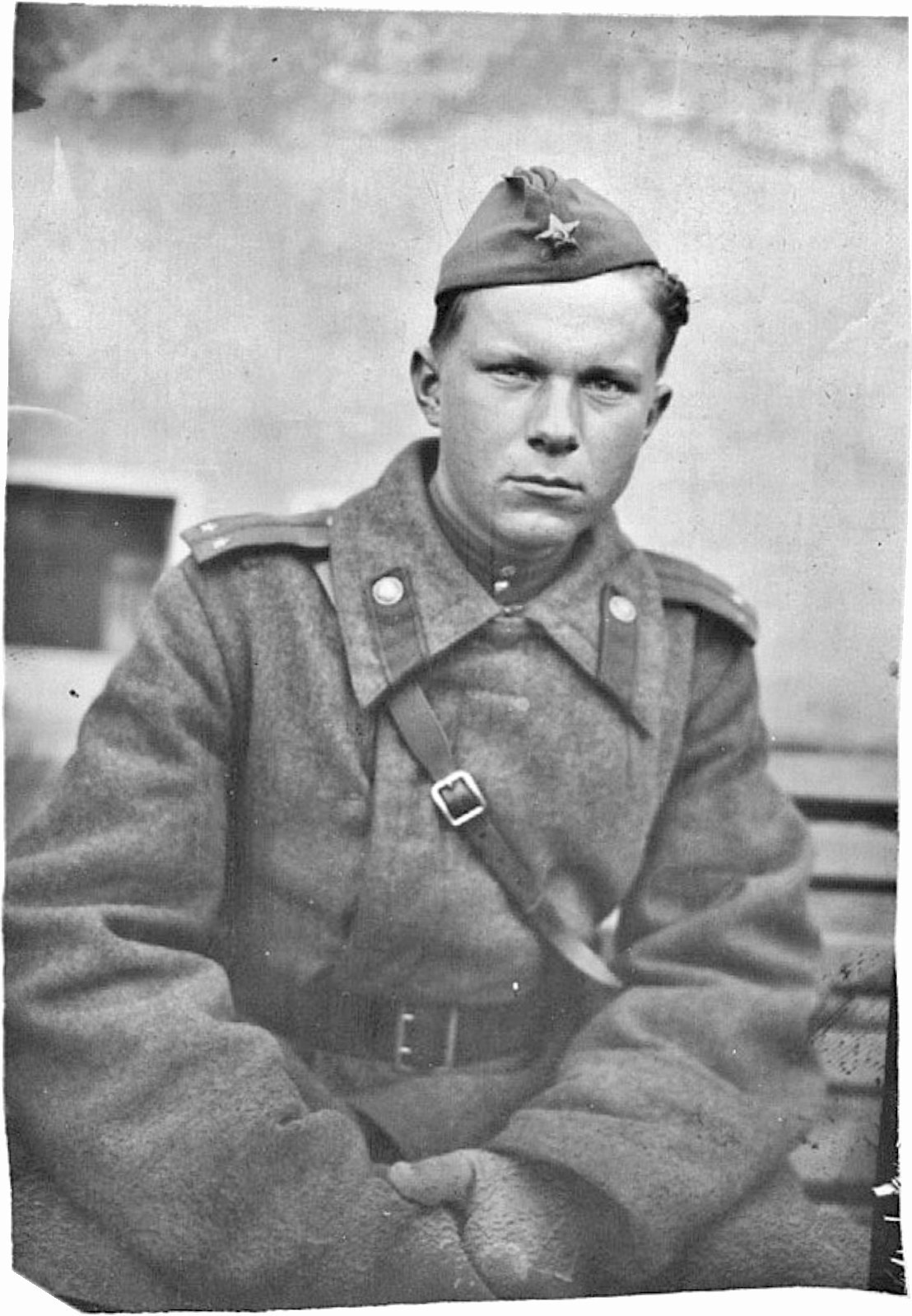
Vasil Bykaŭ, a recipient of the Jubilee Medal "Thirty Years of Victory in the Great Patriotic War 1941–1945"

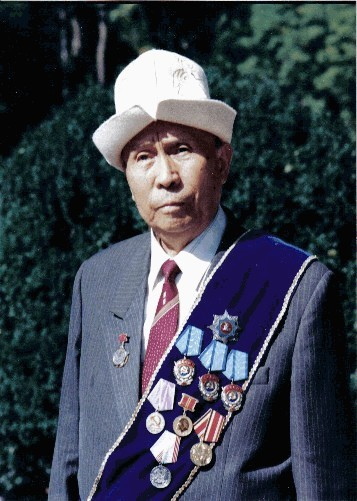
Sopubek Begaliev, a recipient of the Jubilee Medal "Thirty Years of Victory in the Great Patriotic War 1941–1945"

The individuals below were all recipients of the Jubilee Medal "Thirty Years of Victory in the Great Patriotic War 1941–1945".

=== Soviet recipients ===
- Sniper captain Vasily Zaytsev
- Marshal of the Soviet Union and Defence Minister Dmitriy Ustinov
- World War 2 fighter pilot and later Marshal of Aviation Alexander Pokryshkin
- Marshal of the Soviet Union Andrei Grechko
- World War 2 naval veteran and Polar explorer Alexey Tryoshnikov
- Admiral of the Fleet Vladimir Kuroyedov
- Hero of Stalingrad and Colonel General Alexander Rodimtsev
- Lieutenant commander Michael Tsiselsky
- Army General Union Sergei Shtemenko
- Army General Semion Ivanov
- Physicist Alexander Mikhaylovich Prokhorov
- Composer and pianist Tikhon Nikolayevich Khrennikov
- Marshal of the Soviet Union Vasily Ivanovich Chuikov
- Marshal of the Soviet Union Aleksandr Mikhaylovich Vasilevsky
- Major General Vladimir Sergeyevich Ilyushin
- Marshal of the Soviet Union Ivan Ignatyevich Yakubovsky
- Author, Captain Vasil Uładzimiravič Bykaŭ
- Engineer, designer of rocket engines Valentin Petrovich Glushko
- Marshal of the Soviet Union Petr Kirillovich Koshevoi

=== Foreign recipients ===
- Cuban revolutionary and politician Fidel Castro (Cuba)
- General and later President Wojciech Jaruzelski (Poland)
- General Michał Rola-Żymierski (Poland)

== See also ==
- Great Patriotic War
- Orders, decorations, and medals of the Soviet Union
- Badges and Decorations of the Soviet Union
