= Anatoly Gribkov =

Soviet general (1919–2008)

- Born: 23 March 1919; Dukhovoye, Voronezh Governorate, RSFSR
- Died: 12 February 2008 (aged 88); Moscow, Russia
- Military career
- Branch: Soviet Army

Anatoly Ivanovich Gribkov (Russian: Анато́лий Ива́нович Грибко́в) (March 23, 1919 – February 12, 2008) was at Soviet Army High Command during the Cold War era. Gribkov was born in the village of Dukhovoye (now in Liskinsky District of Voronezh Oblast), Russian SFSR on March 23, 1919, to father Ivan Vasilyevich Gribkov and mother Serafima Kuzminichna Gribkova. He had six brothers and three sisters.

== Education ==
When he was older, he attended the J. V. Stalin Armored Troops School, from which he graduated early, and later graduated from the Soviet General Staff Academy with an honours degree and a gold medal.

== Historic events ==
General Anatoly Gribkov played minor but important roles during the events of the Cuban Missile Crisis and Checkpoint Charlie.

He later commanded the Leningrad Military District and, until his retirement in 1989, was the Chief of Staff of the Warsaw Treaty. Gribkov died in Moscow on February 12, 2008.
