= Medal "For the Defence of Moscow" =

For the Defence of Moscow
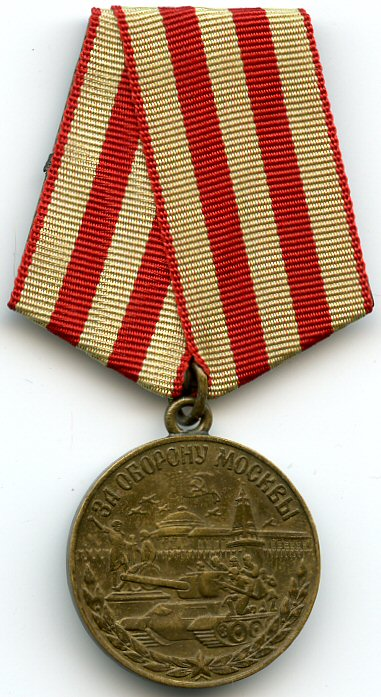
- For the Defence of Moscow (obverse)
- Type: Campaign medal
- Awarded for: Participation in the defence of Moscow
- Presented by: USSR
- Eligibility: Citizens of the Soviet Union
- Status: No longer awarded
- Established: May 1, 1944

Highlights
- Total: 1,028,600
- Ribbon of the Medal "For the Defence of Moscow"

Precedence
- Next (higher): Medal "For the Defence of Leningrad"
- Next (lower): Medal "For the Defence of Odessa"

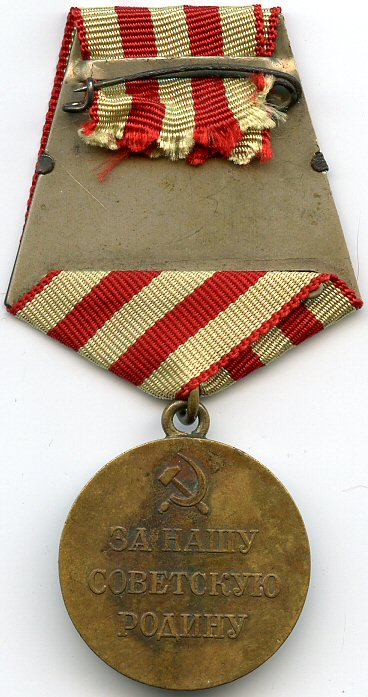
Reverse of the Medal "For the Defence of Moscow"

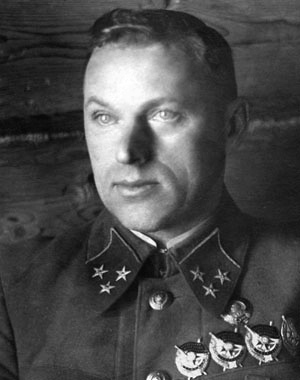
Marshal Rokossovsky, a recipient of the Medal "For the Defence of Moscow"

The Medal "For the Defence of Moscow" (Russian: Медаль «За оборону Москвы», romanised: Medal' "Za oboronu Moskvy") was a World War II campaign medal of the Soviet Union awarded to military personnel and civilians who had participated in the Battle of Moscow.

== History ==
The Medal "For the Defence of Moscow" was established on May 1, 1944 by decree of the Presidium of the Supreme Soviet of the USSR. Its statute was later amended by Resolution of the Presidium of the Supreme Soviet on March 8, 1945. The medal's statute was finally amended one last time on July 18, 1980 by decree of the Presidium of the Supreme Soviet of the USSR № 2523-X.

== Statute ==
The Medal "For the Defence of Moscow" was awarded to all participants in the defence of Moscow - soldiers of the Red Army, troops of the NKVD, as well as persons from the civilian population who took part in the defence of Moscow during the battle of Moscow.

The Resolution of the Presidium of the Supreme Soviet of March 8, 1945 granted the petition of Yaroslavl regional organisations to award the medal "For the Defence of Moscow" to the most distinguished participants in the construction of defensive structures in the Moscow area by the civilian population of the Yaroslavl region.

Award of the medal was made on behalf of the Presidium of the Supreme Soviet of the USSR on the basis of documents attesting to actual participation in the defence of Moscow issued by the unit commander, the chief of the military medical establishment or by a relevant provincial or municipal authority. Serving military personnel received the medal from their unit commander, retirees from military service received the medal from a regional, municipal or district military commissioner in the recipient's community, members of the civilian population, participants in the defence of Moscow received their medal from regional or city Councils of People's Deputies. For the defenders who died in battle or prior to the establishment of the medal, it was awarded posthumously to the family.

The Medal "For the Defence of Moscow" was worn on the left side of the chest and in the presence of other awards of the USSR, it was located immediately after the Medal "For the Defence of Leningrad".If worn in the presence or Orders or medals of the Russian Federation, the latter have precedence.

== Description ==
The Medal "For the Defence of Moscow" is a 32mm in diameter circular brass medal. On the obverse in the background, the Kremlin wall, in front of the wall at lower centre, the left front of a T-34 tank with a group of soldiers on it, below the tank near the medal's lower rim, a relief five pointed star in the centre of a laurel wreath going halfway up the medal's circumference on the left and right. To the left of the tank, the relief image of the monument to Minin and Pozharsky, and to the right of the tank, a Kremlin tower. Over the Kremlin wall, the dome of the Senate building with a hammer and sickle flag waving from its rooftop mast, in the sky above, five combat aircraft flying towards the left. Along the upper circumference of the medal, the relief inscription in prominent letters "FOR DEFENCE OF MOSCOW" (Russian: «ЗА ОБОРОНУ МОСКВЫ»). On the reverse near the top, the relief image of the hammer and sickle, below the image, the relief inscription in three rows "FOR OUR SOVIET MOTHERLAND" (Russian: «ЗА НАШУ СОВЕТСКУЮ РОДИНУ»).

The Medal "For the Defence of Moscow" was secured by a ring through the medal suspension loop to a standard Soviet pentagonal mount covered by a 24 mm wide silk moiré ribbon with 2 mm red edge stripes and five alternating 4 mm wide olive green, red, olive green, red, olive green stripes.

== Recipients (partial list) ==
The individuals below were all recipients of the Medal "For the Defence of Moscow".

- Admiral of the Fleet Ivan Stepanovich Isakov
- Marshal of Aviation Sergei Alexandrovich Khudyakov
- Colonel General Leonid Mikhaylovich Sandalov
- Surgeon-General of the Red Army Nikolay Nilovich Burdenko
- People's Artist of the USSR Nikolay Aleksandrovich Annenkov
- Veteran of World War 2 actor and director Yuri Petrovich Lyubimov
- Marshal of the Soviet Union Sergey Fyodorovich Akhromeyev
- Marshal of the Soviet Union Vasily Danilovich Sokolovsky
- Marshal of the Soviet Union Konstantin Rokossovsky
- Marshal of the Soviet Union Leonid Aleksandrovich Govorov
- Marshal of the Soviet Union Ivan Stepanovich Konev
- Marshal of the Soviet Union Ivan Ignatyevich Yakubovsky
- Major General Vladimir Sergeyevich Ilyushin
- Marshal of the Soviet Union Aleksandr Mikhaylovich Vasilevsky
- Marshal of the Soviet Union Boris Mikhailovitch Shaposhnikov
- Composer and pianist Tikhon Nikolayevich Khrennikov
- Marshal of the Soviet Union Dmitriy Feodorovich Ustinov
- Marshal of the Soviet Union Semyon Konstantinovich Timoshenko
- Marshal of the Soviet Union Georgy Konstantinovich Zhukov
- Admiral of the Fleet Nikolay Gerasimovich Kuznetsov
- Marshal of the Soviet Union Kliment Yefremovich Voroshilov
- Army General Yakov Grigorevich Kreizer
- Army General Stanislav Gilyarovich Poplavsky
- Hero of Socialist Labour Nikolay Vasilyevich Belov
- Rocket designer Boris Evseyevich Chertok
- Sculptor Lev Efimovich Kerbel
- People's Artist of the USSR Olga Vasiliyevna Lepeshinskaya
- Army General Sergei Matveevich Shtemenko
- Marshal of Artillery Vasily Ivanovich Kazakov
- Army General Mikhail Sergeevich Malinin
- Politician Vladimir Ivanovich Dolgikh
- Writer Aleksey Silych Novikov-Priboi
- Colonel Baurzhan Momyshuly
- War correspondent Pyotr Andreyevich Pavlenko
- Aviation scientist Max Arkadyevich Taitz

== See also ==
- Awards and decorations of the Soviet Union
- Hero City
- Yaroslavl
