= Supreme Commander of the Unified Armed Forces of the Warsaw Treaty Organization =

Soviet military post from 1955 to 1991

- Главнокомандующие Объединёнными вооружёнными силами стран-участниц Варшавского договора
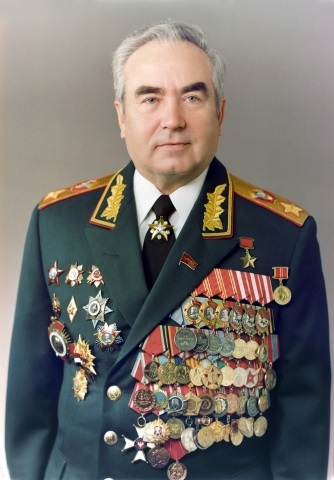
- Longest serving Marshal Viktor Kulikov; 7 January 1977 – February 1989
- Ministry of Defense
- Member of: Warsaw Pact; Ministry of Defense
- Seat: Moscow, Soviet Union
- Formation: 14 May 1955; 71 years ago
- First holder: Ivan Konev
- Final holder: Pyotr Lushev
- Abolished: 1 July 1991; 35 years ago
- Deputy: Chief of Combined Staff

The Supreme Commander of the Unified Armed Forces of the Warsaw Treaty Organization (Russian: Главнокомандующие Объединёнными вооружёнными силами стран-участниц Варшавского договора, romanized: Glavnokomanduyushchiye Obyedinonnymi vooruzhonnymi silami stran-uchastnits Varshavskogo dogovora) was a post in overall command of the military forces of the Warsaw Pact. Furthermore, the Supreme Commander was also a First Deputy Minister of Defense of the Soviet Union. The post, which was instituted in 1955 and abolished in 1991, was always held by a Soviet military officer.

== List of officeholders ==
No.	Portrait	Name	Took office	Left office	Time in office	Defence branch	Ref.
1	Ivan Konev	Marshal of the Soviet Union; Ivan Konev (1897–1973)	14 May 1955	April 1960	4 years, 10 months	Soviet Army	
2	Andrei Grechko	Marshal of the Soviet Union; Andrei Grechko (1903–1976) (Note: Afterwards served as the Minister of Defence of the Soviet Union from 1967 to 1976)	April 1960	12 April 1967	7 years	Soviet Army	–
3	Ivan Yakubovsky	Marshal of the Soviet Union; Ivan Yakubovsky (1912–1976)	12 April 1967	30 November 1976 †	9 years, 232 days	Soviet Army	
4	Viktor Kulikov	Marshal of the Soviet Union; Viktor Kulikov (1921–2013)	7 January 1977	February 1989	12 years	Soviet Army	
5	Pyotr Lushev	Army General; Pyotr Lushev (1923–1997)	February 1989	1 July 1991	2 years, 5 months	Soviet Army	–

== See also ==
- Supreme Allied Commander Europe – NATO counterpart
- Chief of Combined Staff of the Unified Armed Forces of the Warsaw Treaty Organization – head of the Combined Staff of the Warsaw Treaty Organization
