= Vladimir Lobov =

Soviet-Russian retired army general

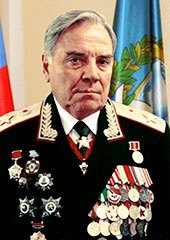
- Born: Vladimir Nikolayevich Lobov; 22 July 1935 (age 91); Buraevo, Burayevsky District, Bashkir ASSR, Russian SFSR, Soviet Union
- Spouse: Valentina Fyodorovna
- Military career
- Allegiance: Soviet Union; Russia
- Service years: 1954–1992
- Rank: Army General
- Commands: Chief of the General Staff; Central Asian Military District
- Conflicts: Invasion of Czechoslovakia
- Awards: Order of the Red Banner; Order of Kutuzov II; Order of the Red Star; Order for Service to the Homeland in the Armed Forces of the USSR II; Order for Service to the Homeland in the Armed Forces of the USSR III

Vladimir Nikolayevich Lobov (Russian: Влади́мир Никола́евич Ло́бов; born 22 July 1935) is a former Soviet and Russian military commander, who was Chief of the General Staff of the Soviet Armed Forces in 1991, General of the Army, Doctor of Military Sciences and People's Deputy of the USSR from 1989 to 1991.

== Biography ==
Lobov was born into a large family with six children on 22 July 1935 in the village of Buraevo, having four brothers and a sister. His father was a mechanic of machine and tractor systems (MTS), and his mother also worked on the farm. Lobov found his childhood quite difficult as his family were often missing clothes and food, and his school was far from home, where he had to walk in severe weather conditions.

In 1954, he was drafted into the Soviet Army, serving in the Artillery Regiment of the 201st Mountain Division of the Turkestan Military District in Stalinabad. In September 1956, Sergeant Lobov was sent to study at the Ryazan Artillery School, where he graduated in 1959, reaching the rank of Lieutenant. After graduation, he became the Commander of a platoon of cadets. In 1960, he passed the retraining of military courses and in September, he was sent to the newly formed Strategic Rocket Forces of the USSR, serving as the commander of a platoon of cadets, the instructor and assistant chief of training in the training school of Sergeants in the Missile Division in the Chita region. Lobov served until 1964 and was sent for entrance exams in Moscow in the Frunze Military Academy. In 1967, he graduated and reached the rank of captain.

In August 1968, he participated in the invasion of Czechoslovakia, and his battalion captured a military airfield near Prague. In May 1969, he became the Chief of Staff, and from 1970, became the Commander of the 74th Separate Motorised Rifle Regiment of Training in the Group of Soviet Forces in Germany.

In October 1973, he became the commander of the 63rd Guards Training Mechanised Infantry Division in the Leningrad Military District. In 1975, he reached the rank of major general and in December 1975, he became the Commander of the 26th Army Corps in Arkhangelsk. In 1979, he graduated from the Military Academy of the General Staff of the Armed Forces of the USSR. In 1979, he became the commander of the 28th Combined Arms Army in the Belorussian Military District. In October 1981, he became the first deputy commander of the Leningrad Military District. In June 1984, he became the commander of the Central Asian Military District.

In January 1987, he became the first deputy chief of the General Staff of the Soviet Armed Forces, on behalf of Gorbachev, who developed a military reform project, which changed the length of military service from 2 years to 18 months. However, disagreement led to the Minister of Defence, Yazov, being removed from office in November 1988. From 24 January 1989, he became the first deputy chief of the General Staff of the Soviet Armed Forces.

After the Soviet coup attempt on 23 August 1991, he was appointed Chief of the General Staff of the Soviet Armed Forces. From 1–25 December 1991, he became a member of the Council of Defence of the President of the USSR.

On 7 December 1991, he was released from the post of Chief of the General Staff. In 1992, he became a military inspector-adviser of the Group of Inspectors General of the Ministry of Defence. After its disbandment in May 1992, he was for some time a military adviser to the Russian President. He then also worked on a military reform project. In March 1992, he retired.

== Personal life ==
Lobov is married to Valentina Fyodorovna, a teacher, has a son and daughter, and three grandchildren. In his spare time, he enjoys reading, listening to classical and folk music, watching theatre and taking nature walks. He currently lives in Moscow.

Military offices
Preceded by Mikhail Moiseyev	Chief of the General Staff of the Armed Forces of the Soviet Union; 25 August 1991 – 7 December 1991	Succeeded by Viktor Samsonov
