= Warsaw Pact =

Eastern European military alliance (1955–1991)

Warsaw Pact Organisation Warsaw Treaty Organisation (Note: Russian: Организация Варшавского договора, romanized: Organizatsiya Varshavskogo dogovora (ОВД), Azerbaijani: Varşava Müqaviləsi Təşkilatı (VMT), Belarusian: Арганізацыя Варшаўскага Дагавора, romanized: Arhanizacyja Varšaŭskaha Dahavora (АВД), Bulgarian: Организация на Варшавския договор (ОВД), Czech: Organizace Varšavské Smlouvy (OVS), German: Organisation des Warschauer Vertrags (OWV), Estonian: Varssavi Lepingu Organisatsioon (VLO), Kazakh: Варшава келісімі ұйымы, romanized: Varşava kelısımı ūiymy (ВКҰ, VKU), Latvian: Varšavas Līguma Organizācija (VLO), Lithuanian: Varšuvos Sutarties Organizacija (VSO), Kyrgyz: Варшавa келишими уюму (ВКУ), Polish: Organizacja Układu Warszawskiego (OUW), Slovak: Organizácia Varšavskej Zmluvy (OVZ), Ukrainian: Організація варшавського договору, romanized: Orhanizatsiya varshavskoho dohovoru (ОВД), Uzbek: Варшава шартномаси ташкилоти, romanized: Varshava shartnomasi tashkiloti (ВШТ, VShT)) Treaty of Friendship, Cooperation and Mutual Assistance
- 1955–1991
- Emblem
- Anthem: Песня Oбъединённых Aрмий "Song of the United Armies"
- Warsaw Pact member states in 1989 Albania withdrew in 1968
- Headquarters: Moscow, Russian SFSR, Soviet Union
- Recognized national languages: Russian, German, Hungarian, Czech, Slovak, Romanian, Albanian, Bulgarian, Polish
- Type: Collective security military alliance
- Membership: Albania (Note: De facto expelled in 1961 because of the Albanian–Soviet split, formally withdrew in 1968.); Bulgaria; Czechoslovakia; East Germany (Note: Formally withdrew in September 1990.); Hungary; Poland; Romania (Note: Independent permanent non-Soviet member of the Warsaw Pact, having freed itself from its Soviet satellite status by the early 1960s.); Soviet Union

Leaders
  - Supreme commander: Ivan Konev (first); Pyotr Lushev (last)
  - Chief of combined staff: Aleksei Antonov (first); Vladimir Lobov (last)

Establishment
  - Treaty signed: 14 May 1955; 71 years ago
  - Pact disbanded: 25 February 1991; 35 years ago
  - Treaty disestablished: 1 July 1991; 35 years ago
- Today part of: Collective Security Treaty Organization, NATO

The Warsaw Pact (WP), (Note: Russian: Варшавский пакт, romanized: Varshavsky pakt, Albanian: Pakti i Varshavës, Armenian: Վարշավայի պայմանագրի կազմակերպություն, romanized: Varšavayi pazmanagri kazmakerpowt'yown, Belarusian: Варшаўскі дагавор, romanized: Varshawski dahavor, Bulgarian: Варшавският договор, romanized: Varshavskiyat dogovor, Czech: Varšavská Smlouva, Georgian: ვარშავის პაქტი, romanized: Varshavis p'akt'i, German: Warschauer Pakt, Estonian: Varssavi Pakt, Hungarian: Varsói Szerződés, Kyrgyz: Варшавa келишими, romanized: Varshava kelishimi, Lithuanian: Varšuvos paktas, Latvian: Varšavas Pakts, Polish: Układ Warszawski, Romanian: Pactul de la Varșovia, Slovak: Varšavská zmluva, Ukrainian: Варшавський договір, romanized: Varshavskyi dohovir) formally the Treaty of Friendship, Cooperation and Mutual Assistance (TFCMA), (Note: Russian: Договор о дружбе, сотрудничестве и взаимной помощи, romanized: Dogovor o druzhbe, sotrudnichestve i vzaimnoy pomoshchi, Armenian: Վարշավայի պայմանագրի կազմակերպություն, Բարեկամության, համագործակցության և փոխադարձ օգնության պայմանագիր, romanized: Varšavayi paymanagri kazmakerpowt'yown, barekamowt'yan, hamagorcakc'owt'yan ew p'oxadarj ògnowt'yan paymanagir, Belarusian: Дагавор аб дружбе, супрацоўніцтве і ўзаемнай дапамозе, romanized: Dahavor ab druzhbye, supratsownitstvye i wzayemnay dapamozye, Bulgarian: Договор за приятелство, съдействие и взаимопомощ, romanized: Dogovor za priyatelstvo, sadeystvie i vzaimopomosht, Czech: Smlouva o Přátelství, Spolupráci a Vzájemné Pomoci, German: Vertrag über Freundschaft, Zusammenarbeit und gegenseitige Unterstützung, Georgian: მეგობრობის, თანამშრომლობისა და ურთიერთდახმარების ხელშეკრულება, romanized: megobrobis, tanamshromlobisa da urtiertdakhmarebis khelshek'ruleba, Latvian: Līguma par Draudzību, Sadarbību un Savstarpējo Palīdzību, Polish: Układ o Przyjaźni, Współpracy i Pomocy Wzajemnej, Romanian: Tratatul de Prietenie, Cooperare și Asistență Mutuală, Slovak: Zmluva o Priateľstve, Spolupráci a Vzájomnej Pomoci, Ukrainian: Договір про дружбу, співробітництво і взаємну допомогу, romanized: Dohovir pro druzhbu. spitrobititnitstvo i vzaiemnu, Uzbek: До'стлик, ҳамкорлик ва о'заро ёрдам шартномаси, romanized: Do'stlik, hamkorlik va o'zaro yordam shartnomasi) was a collective defence treaty signed in Warsaw, Poland, between the Soviet Union and seven other Eastern Bloc socialist republics in Central and Eastern Europe in May 1955, during the Cold War. The term "Warsaw Pact" commonly refers to both the treaty itself and its resultant military alliance, the Warsaw Pact Organisation (WPO; also known as the Warsaw Treaty Organization, WTO). The Warsaw Pact was the military complement to the Council for Mutual Economic Assistance (Comecon), the economic organization for the Eastern Bloc states.

Dominated by the Soviet Union, the Warsaw Pact was established as a balance of power or counterweight to the North Atlantic Treaty Organization (NATO) and the Western Bloc. There was no direct military confrontation between the two organizations; instead, the conflict was fought on an ideological basis and through proxy wars. Both NATO and the Warsaw Pact led to the expansion of military forces and their integration into the respective blocs. The Warsaw Pact's largest military engagement was the Warsaw Pact invasion of Czechoslovakia, one of its own member states, in August 1968. All member states participated except for Albania and Romania, resulting in Albania's withdrawal from the pact less than one month later. The pact began to unravel with the spread of the Revolutions of 1989 through the Eastern Bloc, beginning with the Solidarity movement in Poland, its electoral success in June 1989 and the Pan-European Picnic in August 1989.

East Germany withdrew from the pact following German reunification in 1990. On 25 February 1991, at a meeting in Hungary, the pact ceased to exist via joint declaration by the defence and foreign ministers of the six remaining member states. The USSR itself was dissolved in December 1991, although most of the former Soviet republics formed the Collective Security Treaty Organization shortly thereafter. In the following 20 years, the Warsaw Pact countries outside the USSR each joined NATO (East Germany through its reunification with West Germany; and the Czech Republic and Slovakia as separate countries), as did the Baltic states.

== History ==
=== Beginnings ===
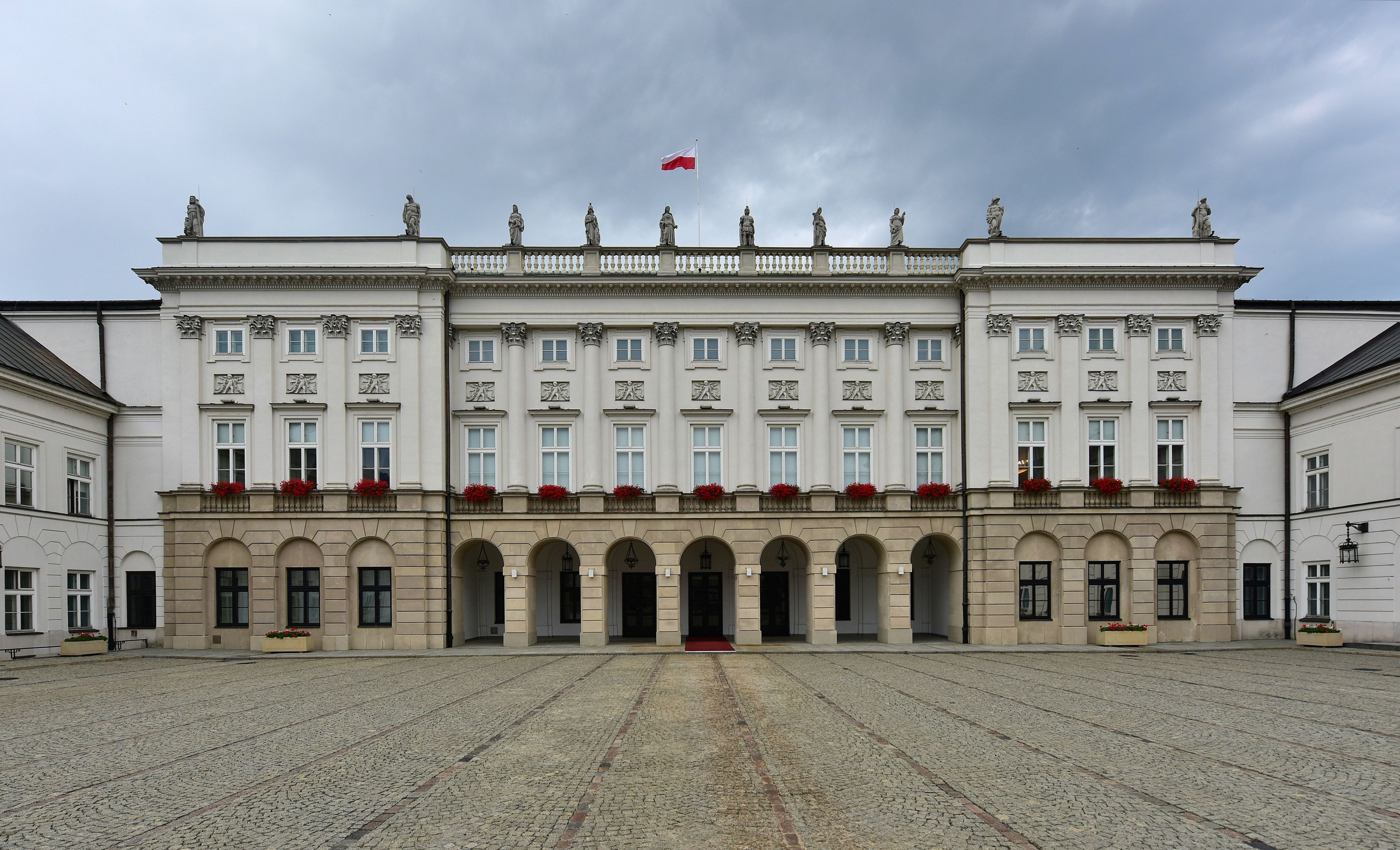
The Presidential Palace in Warsaw, Poland, where the Warsaw Pact was established and signed on 14 May 1955.

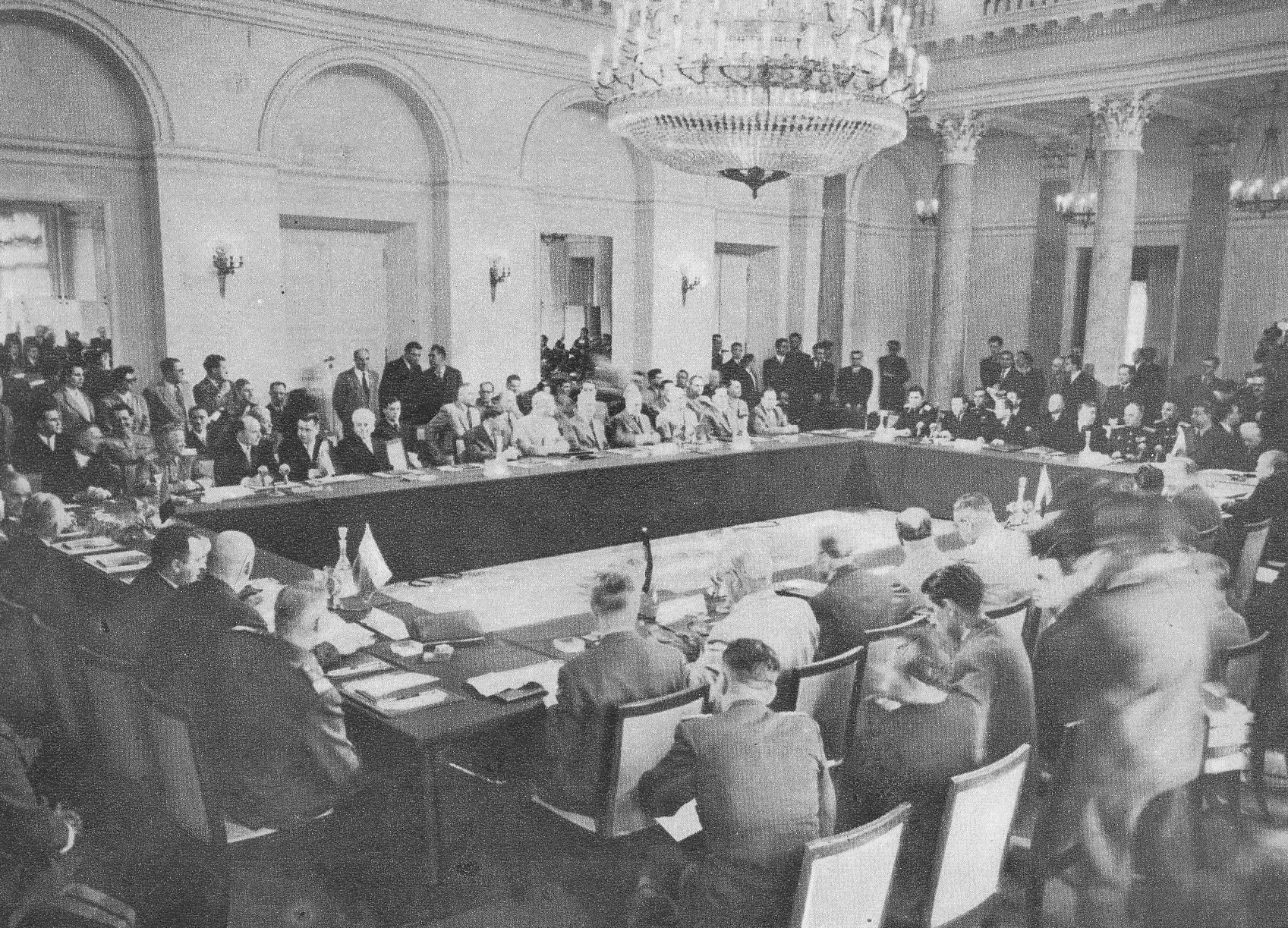
Conference during which the Pact was established and signed.

Before the creation of the Warsaw Pact, the Czechoslovak leadership, fearful of a re-militarized West Germany, sought to create a security pact with East Germany and Poland. These states protested strongly against the re-militarization of West Germany. The Warsaw Pact was put in place as a consequence of the rearming of West Germany inside NATO. Soviet leaders, like many European leaders on both sides of the Iron Curtain, feared Germany being once again a military power and a direct threat. The consequences of German militarism remained a fresh memory among the Soviets and Eastern Europeans. As the Soviet Union already had an armed presence and political domination all over its eastern satellite states by 1955, the pact has been long considered "superfluous", and because of the rushed way in which it was conceived, NATO officials labeled it a "cardboard castle".

The Iron Curtain (black line) Warsaw Pact countries NATO countries (May 1982 to October 1990) Militarily neutral countries Yugoslavia, member of the Non-Aligned Movement The black dot represents West Berlin, an enclave aligned with West Germany. Albania withheld its support to the Warsaw Pact in 1961 due to the Soviet–Albanian split and formally withdrew in 1968.

The USSR, fearing the restoration of German militarism in West Germany, had suggested in 1954 that it join NATO, but this was rejected by the US.

The Soviet request to join NATO arose in the aftermath of the Berlin Conference of January–February 1954. Soviet foreign minister Molotov made proposals to have Germany reunified and elections for a pan-German government, under conditions of withdrawal of the four powers' armies and German neutrality, but all were refused by the other foreign ministers, Dulles (US), Eden (UK), and Bidault (France). Proposals for the reunification of Germany were nothing new: earlier on 20 March 1952, talks about a German reunification, initiated by the so-called 'Stalin Note', ended after the United Kingdom, France, and the United States insisted that a unified Germany should not be neutral and should be free to join the European Defence Community (EDC) and rearm. James Dunn (US), who met in Paris with Eden, Konrad Adenauer (West Germany), and Robert Schuman (France), affirmed that "the object should be to avoid discussion with the Russians and to press on the European Defense Community". According to John Gaddis, "there was little inclination in Western capitals to explore this offer" from the USSR, while historian Rolf Steininger asserts that Adenauer's conviction that "neutralization means sovietization", referring to the Soviet Union's policies towards Finland known as finlandization, was the main factor in the rejection of the Soviet proposals. Adenauer also feared that German unification might have resulted in the end of the CDU's leading political role in the West German Bundestag.

Consequently, Molotov, fearing that the EDC would be directed in the future against the USSR and "seeking to prevent the formation of groups of European States directed against the other European States", made a proposal for a General European Treaty on Collective Security in Europe "open to all European States without regard to their social systems", which would have included the unified Germany (thus rendering the EDC obsolete). But Eden, Dulles, and Bidault opposed the proposal.

One month later, the proposed European Treaty was rejected not only by supporters of the EDC, but also by Western opponents of the European Defence Community (like French Gaullist leader Gaston Palewski) who perceived it as "unacceptable in its present form because it excludes the USA from participation in the collective security system in Europe". The Soviets then decided to make a new proposal to the governments of the US, UK, and France to accept the participation of the US in the proposed General European Agreement. As another argument deployed against the Soviet proposal was that it was perceived by Western powers as "directed against the North Atlantic Pact and its liquidation", the Soviets decided to declare their "readiness to examine jointly with other interested parties the question of the participation of the USSR in the North Atlantic bloc", specifying that "the admittance of the USA into the General European Agreement should not be conditional on the three Western powers agreeing to the USSR joining the North Atlantic Pact". Again, all Soviet proposals, including the request to join NATO, were rejected by the UK, US, and French governments shortly after. Emblematic was the position of British General Hastings Ismay, a fierce supporter of NATO expansion. He opposed the request to join NATO made by the USSR in 1954 saying that "the Soviet request to join NATO is like an unrepentant burglar requesting to join the police force".

In April 1954, Adenauer made his first visit to the United States, meeting Nixon, Eisenhower, and Dulles. Ratification of the EDC was delayed but the US representatives made it clear to Adenauer that the EDC would have to become a part of NATO.

Memories of the Nazi occupation were still strong, and the rearmament of Germany was feared by France too. On 30 August 1954, the French Parliament rejected the EDC, thus ensuring its failure and blocking a major objective of US policy towards Europe: to associate West Germany militarily with the West. The US Department of State started to elaborate alternatives: West Germany would be invited to join NATO or, in the case of French obstructionism, strategies to circumvent a French veto would be implemented in order to obtain German rearmament outside NATO.

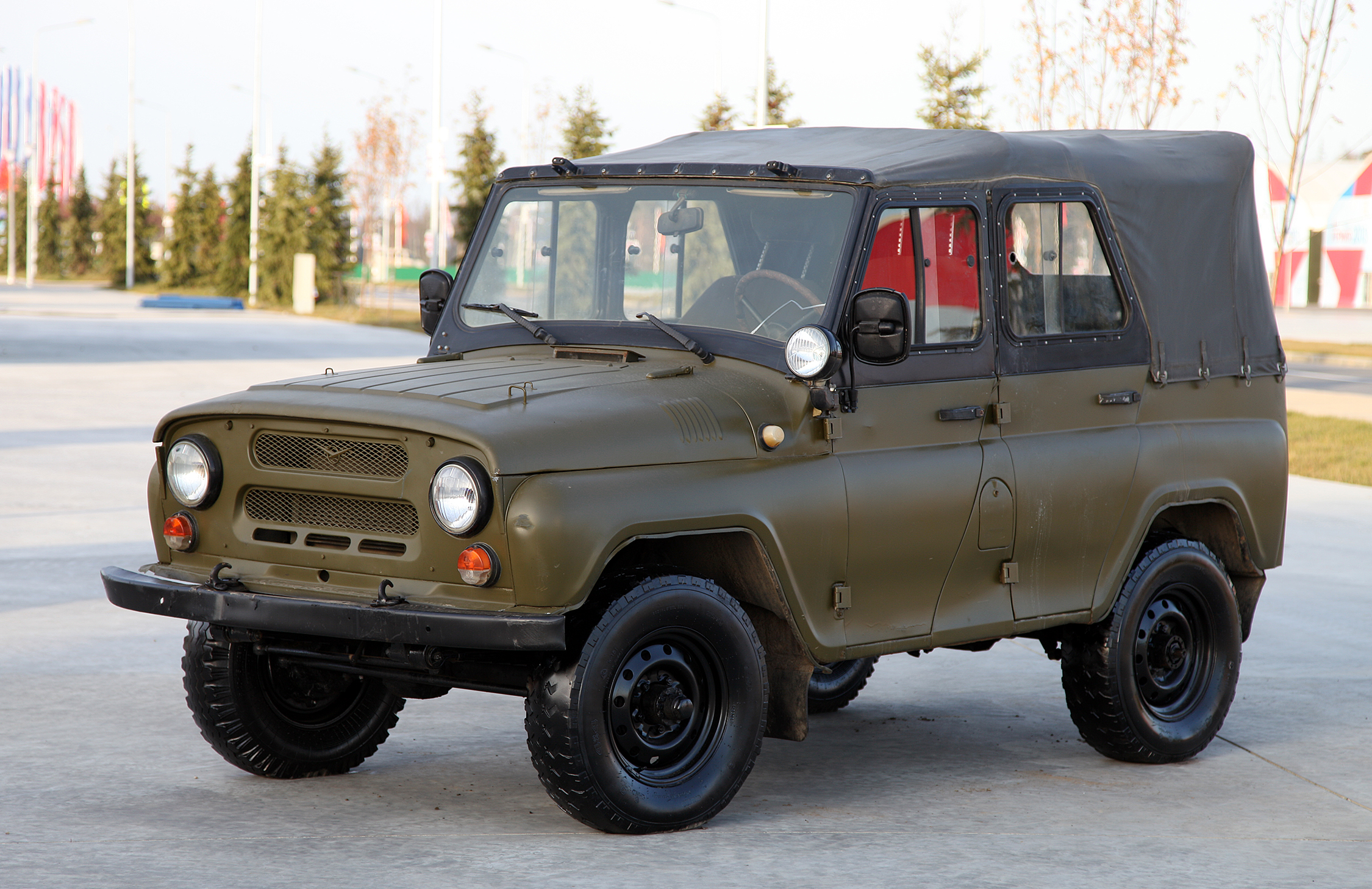
A typical Soviet military vehicle UAZ-469, used by most countries of the Warsaw Pact

On 23 October 1954, the admission of the Federal Republic of Germany to the North Atlantic Pact was finally decided. The incorporation of West Germany into the organization on 9 May 1955 was described as "a decisive turning point in the history of our continent" by Halvard Lange, Foreign Affairs Minister of Norway at the time. In November 1954, the USSR requested a new European Security Treaty, in order to make a final attempt to not have a remilitarized West Germany potentially opposed to the Soviet Union, with no success.

On 14 May 1955, the USSR and seven other Eastern European countries "reaffirming their desire for the establishment of a system of European collective security based on the participation of all European states irrespective of their social and political systems" established the Warsaw Pact in response to the integration of the Federal Republic of Germany into NATO, declaring that: "a remilitarized Western Germany and the integration of the latter in the North-Atlantic bloc [...] increase the danger of another war and constitutes a threat to the national security of the peaceable states; [...] in these circumstances the peaceable European states must take the necessary measures to safeguard their security".

One of the pact's founding members, East Germany, was allowed to re-arm by the Soviet Union and the National People's Army was established as the armed forces of the country to counter the rearmament of West Germany.

The USSR concentrated on its own recovery, seizing and transferring most of Germany's industrial plants, and it exacted war reparations from East Germany, Hungary, Romania, and Bulgaria using Soviet-dominated joint enterprises. It also instituted trading arrangements deliberately designed to favour the country. Moscow controlled the Communist parties that ruled the satellite states, and they followed orders from the Kremlin. Historian Mark Kramer concludes: "The net outflow of resources from eastern Europe to the Soviet Union was approximately $15 billion to $20 billion in the first decade after World War II, an amount roughly equal to the total aid provided by the United States to western Europe under the Marshall Plan."

In November 1956, Soviet forces invaded Hungary, a Warsaw Pact member state, and violently put down the Hungarian Revolution. After that, the USSR made bilateral 20-year-treaties with Poland (17 December 1956), the GDR (12 March 1957), Romania (15 April 1957; Soviet forces were later removed as part of Romania's de-satellization), and Hungary (27 May 1957), ensuring that Soviet troops were deployed in these countries.

=== Members ===
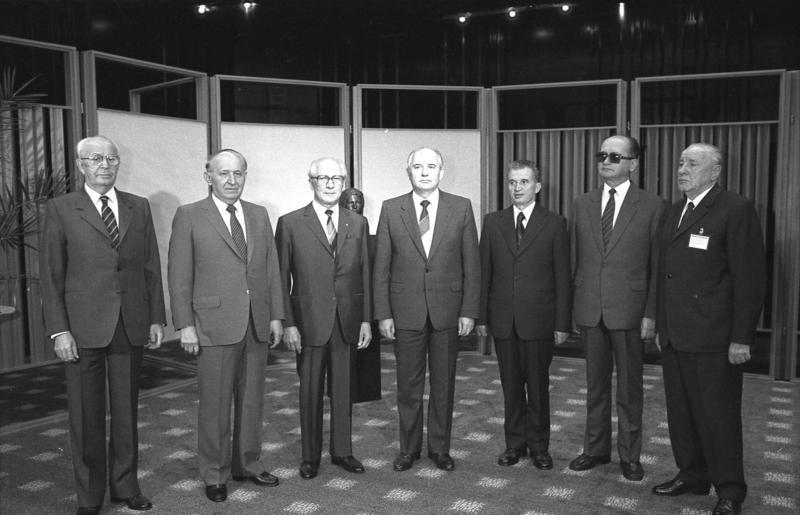
Meeting of the seven representatives of the Warsaw Pact countries in East Berlin in May 1987. From left to right: Gustáv Husák (Czechoslovakia), Todor Zhivkov (Bulgaria), Erich Honecker (East Germany), Mikhail Gorbachev (Soviet Union), Nicolae Ceaușescu (Romania), Wojciech Jaruzelski (Poland), and János Kádár (Hungary)

The founding signatories of the Pact consisted of the following communist governments:

- People's Republic of Albania (withheld support in 1961 because of the Albanian–Soviet split, but formally withdrew on 13 September 1968)
- People's Republic of Bulgaria
- (Czechoslovakia) Czechoslovak Republic
- German Democratic Republic (officially withdrew on 24 September 1990 in preparation for German reunification, with Soviet consent and a "remarkable yet hardly noticed" ceremony, ceasing to exist altogether at midnight on 3 October)
- Hungarian People's Republic (temporarily withdrew from 1–4 November 1956 during the Hungarian Revolution)
- Polish People's Republic
- (Socialist Republic of Romania) Romanian People's Republic (the only independent permanent non-Soviet member of the Warsaw Pact, having freed itself from its Soviet satellite status by the early 1960s)
- Soviet Union

=== Observers ===
Mongolia: In July 1963, the Mongolian People's Republic asked to join the Warsaw Pact under Article 9 of the treaty. Due to the emerging Sino-Soviet split, Mongolia remained in an observer status. In what was the first instance of a Soviet initiative being blocked by a non-Soviet member of the Warsaw Pact, Romania blocked Mongolia's accession to the Warsaw Pact. The Soviet government agreed to station troops in Mongolia in 1966.

At first, China, North Korea, and North Vietnam had observer status, but China terminated its observer status in 1961 as a consequence of the Albanian-Soviet split, in which China backed Albania against the USSR as part of the larger Sino-Soviet split of the early 1960s.

=== During the Cold War ===
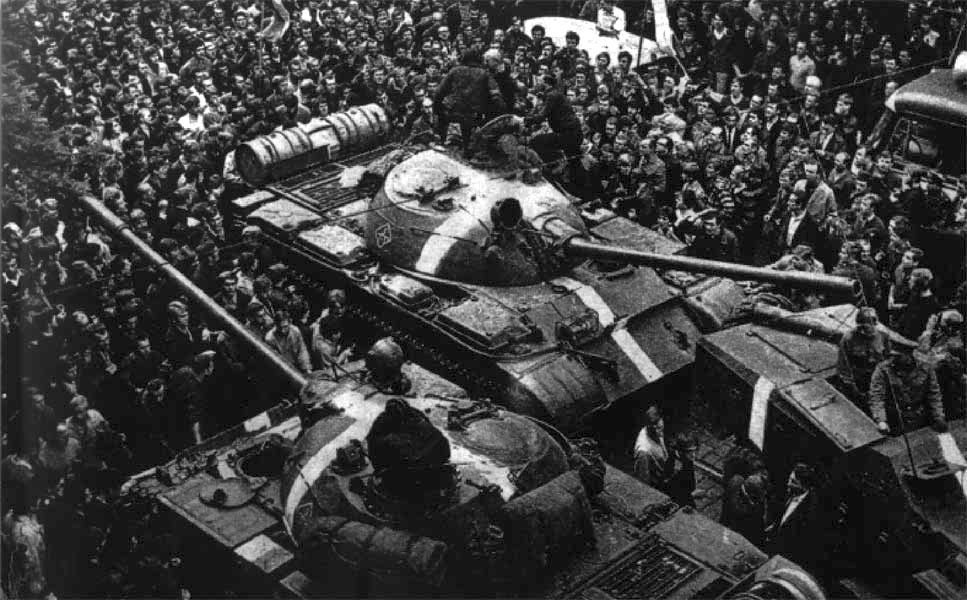
Soviet tanks, marked with white crosses to distinguish them from Czechoslovak tanks, on the streets of Prague during the Warsaw Pact invasion of Czechoslovakia, 1968

For 36 years, NATO and the Warsaw Pact never directly waged war against each other in Europe; the United States and the Soviet Union and their respective allies implemented strategic policies aimed at the containment of each other in Europe, while working and fighting for influence within the wider Cold War on the international stage. These included the Korean War, Vietnam War, Bay of Pigs invasion, Dirty War, Cambodian–Vietnamese War, and others.

The Soviet Ground Forces created and directed the Eastern European armies in its image during the Cold War, shaping them for a potential confrontation with NATO. After 1956, Nikita Khrushchev, General Secretary of the Communist Party, reduced the Ground Forces to build up the Strategic Rocket Forces, emphasizing the armed forces' nuclear capabilities. He removed Marshal Georgy Zhukov from the Politburo in 1957 for opposing these reductions in the Ground Forces. Soviet and WarPac forces repeatedly rehearsed the large-scale use of nuclear weapons in invasion exercises, such as 1964 Czech planning, which would have seen Lyon seized by the ninth day of the advance, and the Polish Seven Days to the River Rhine (1979). Nonetheless, Soviet forces possessed too few theatre-level nuclear weapons to fulfil war-plan requirements until the mid-1980s. The General Staff maintained plans to invade Western Europe whose massive scale was only made publicly available after researchers gained access to Eastern Bloc files following the dissolution of the Soviet Union.

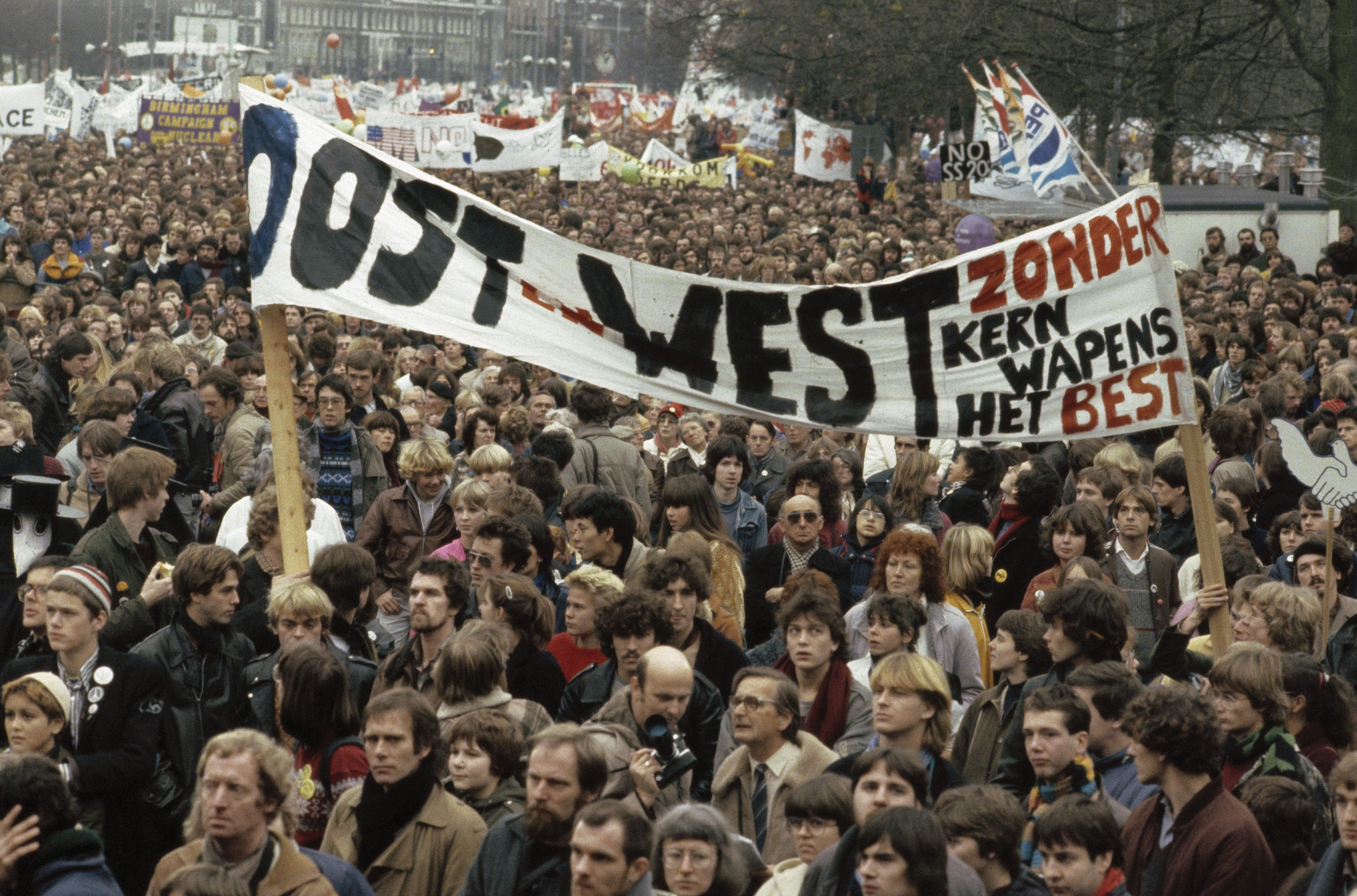
Protest in Amsterdam against the nuclear arms race between NATO and the Warsaw Pact, 1981

In 1956, following the declaration of the Imre Nagy government of the withdrawal of Hungary from the Warsaw Pact, Soviet troops entered the country and removed the government. Soviet forces crushed the nationwide revolt, leading to the death of an estimated 2,500 Hungarian citizens.

The multi-national Communist armed forces' sole joint action was the Warsaw Pact invasion of Czechoslovakia, a Warsaw Pact member state, in August 1968. All member countries, with the exception of the Socialist Republic of Romania and the People's Republic of Albania, participated in the invasion. The German Democratic Republic provided only minimal support. Albania withdrew from the pact one month after the intervention.

In April 1985, the leaders of Warsaw Pact members met in Warsaw where they renewed the alliance for thirty years, which would have retained the treaty behind it until May 2015.

=== End of the Cold War ===
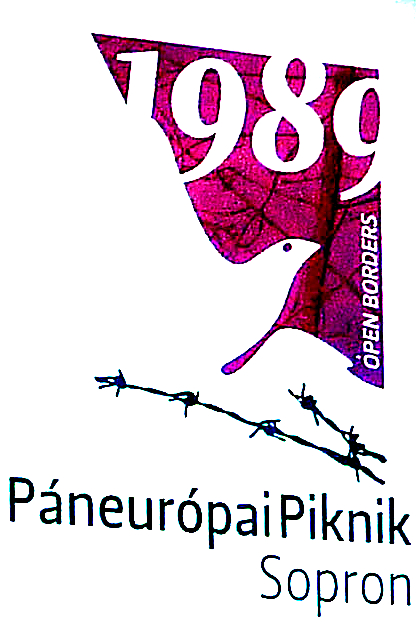
The Pan-European Picnic took place on the Hungarian-Austrian border in 1989.

In 1989, popular civil and political public discontent toppled the Communist governments of the Warsaw Treaty countries. The beginning of the end of the Warsaw Pact, regardless of military power, was the Pan-European Picnic in August 1989. The event, which goes back to an idea by Otto von Habsburg, caused the mass exodus of GDR citizens and the media-informed population of Eastern Europe felt the loss of power of their rulers and the Iron Curtain broke down completely. Though Poland's new Solidarity government under Lech Wałęsa initially assured the Soviets that it would remain in the Pact, this broke the brackets of Eastern Europe, which could no longer be held together militarily by the Warsaw Pact. Independent national politics made feasible with the perestroika and liberal glasnost policies revealed shortcomings and failures (i.e. of the soviet-type economic planning model) and induced institutional collapse of the Communist government in the USSR in 1991. From 1989 to 1991, Communist governments were overthrown in Poland, Hungary, Czechoslovakia, East Germany, Romania, Bulgaria, and the Soviet Union.

As the last acts of the Cold War were playing out, several Warsaw Pact states (Poland, Czechoslovakia, and Hungary) participated in the US-led coalition effort to liberate Kuwait in the Gulf War.

On 25 February 1991, the Warsaw Pact was declared disbanded at a meeting of defence and foreign ministers from remaining Pact countries meeting in Hungary. On 1 July 1991, in Prague, the Czechoslovak President Václav Havel formally ended the 1955 Warsaw Treaty Organization of Friendship, Cooperation and Mutual Assistance and so disestablished the Warsaw Treaty after 36 years of military alliance with the USSR. The USSR disestablished itself in December 1991.

== Structure ==
The Warsaw Treaty's organization was two-fold: the Political Consultative Committee handled political matters, and the Combined Command of Pact Armed Forces controlled the assigned multi-national forces, with headquarters in Warsaw, Poland.

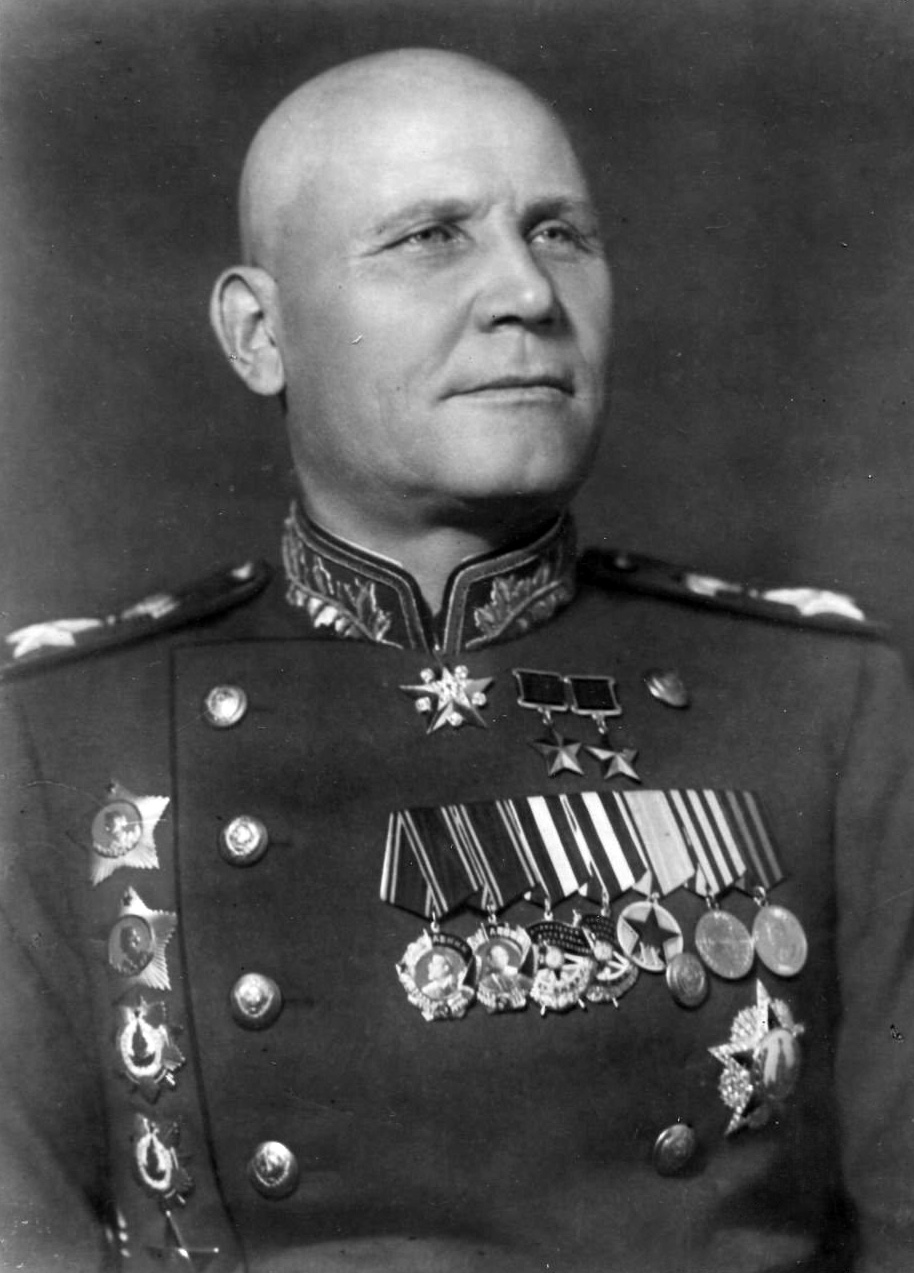
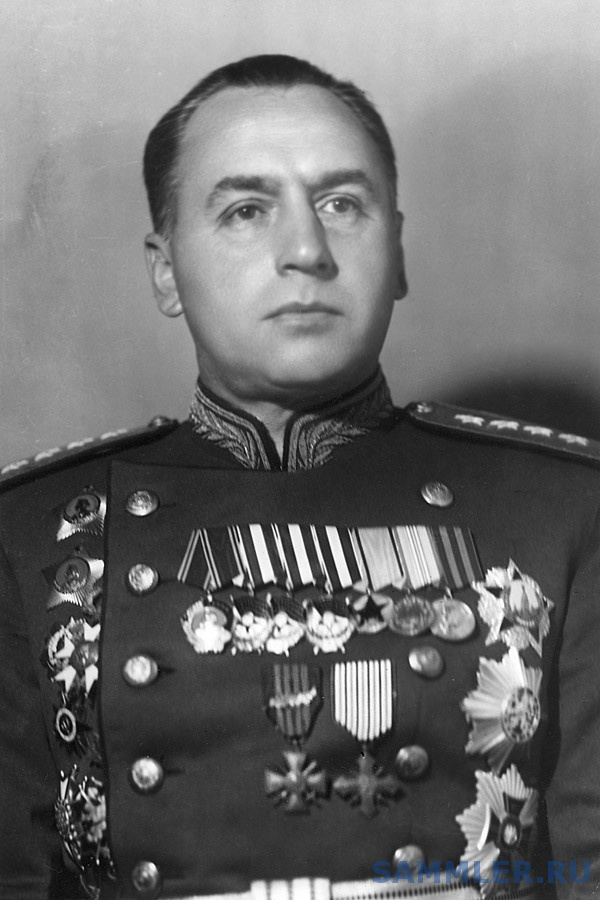
Marshal of the Soviet Union Ivan Konev (left) served as the first Supreme Commander of the Pact (1955–1960) while Army General Aleksei Antonov served as the first Chief of Combined Staff of the Pact (1955–1962).

Although an apparently similar collective security alliance, the Warsaw Pact differed substantially from NATO. De jure, the eight-member countries of the Warsaw Pact pledged the mutual defence of any member who would be attacked; relations among the treaty signatories were based upon mutual non-intervention in the internal affairs of the member countries, respect for national sovereignty, and political independence.

However, de facto, the Pact was a direct reflection of the USSR's authoritarianism and undisputed domination over the Eastern Bloc, in the context of the so-called Soviet Empire, which was not comparable to that of the United States over the Western Bloc. All Warsaw Pact commanders had to be, and have been, senior officers of the Soviet Union at the same time and appointed for an unspecified term length: the Supreme Commander of the Unified Armed Forces of the Warsaw Treaty Organization, which commanded and controlled all the military forces of the member countries, was also a First Deputy Minister of Defence of the USSR, and the Chief of Combined Staff of the Unified Armed Forces of the Warsaw Treaty Organization was also a First Deputy Chief of the General Staff of the Soviet Armed Forces. On the contrary, the Secretary General of NATO and Chair of the NATO Military Committee are positions with fixed term of office held on a random rotating basis by officials from all member countries through consensus.

Despite the American hegemony (mainly military and economic) over NATO, all decisions of the North Atlantic Alliance required unanimous consensus in the North Atlantic Council and the entry of countries into the alliance was not subject to domination but rather a natural democratic process. In the Warsaw Pact, decisions were ultimately taken by the Soviet Union alone; the countries of the Warsaw Pact were not equally able to negotiate their entry in the Pact nor the decisions taken.

Although nominally a "defensive" alliance, the Pact's primary function was to safeguard the Soviet Union's hegemony over its Eastern European satellites, with the Pact's only direct military actions having been the invasions of its own member states to keep them from breaking away.

=== Romania and Albania ===
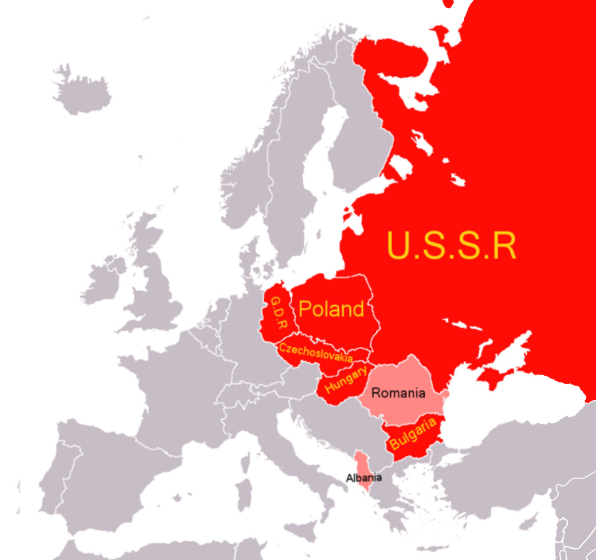
The Warsaw Pact before its 1968 invasion of Czechoslovakia, showing the Soviet Union and its satellites (red) and the two independent non-Soviet members: Romania and Albania (pink)

Romania and (until 1968) Albania were exceptions. Together with Yugoslavia, which broke with the Soviet Union before the Warsaw Pact was created, these three countries completely rejected the Soviet doctrine formulated for the Pact. Albania officially left the organization in 1968, in protest of its invasion of Czechoslovakia. Romania had its own reasons for remaining a formal member of the Warsaw Pact, such as Nicolae Ceaușescu's interest of preserving the threat of a Pact invasion so he could sell himself as a nationalist, as well as privileged access to NATO counterparts and a seat at various European forums which otherwise he would not have had (for instance, Romania and the Soviet-led remainder of the Warsaw Pact formed two distinct groups in the elaboration of the Helsinki Final Act). When Andrei Grechko assumed command of the Warsaw Pact, both Romania and Albania had for all practical purposes defected from the Pact. In the early 1960s, Grechko initiated programmes meant to preempt Romanian doctrinal heresies from spreading to other Pact members. Romania's doctrine of territorial defence threatened the Pact's unity and cohesion. No other country succeeded in escaping from the Warsaw Pact like Romania and Albania did. For example, the mainstays of Romania's tank forces were locally developed models. Soviet troops were deployed to Romania for the last time in 1963, as part of a Warsaw Pact exercise. After 1964, the Soviet Army was barred from returning to Romania, as the country refused to take part in joint Pact exercises.

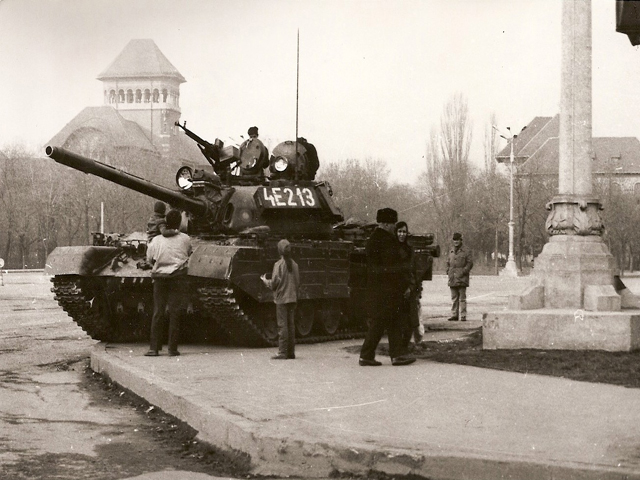
A Romanian TR-85 tank in December 1989 (Romania's TR-85 and TR-580 tanks were the only non-Soviet tanks in the Warsaw Pact on which restrictions were placed under the 1990 CFE Treaty)

Even before the advent of Nicolae Ceaușescu, Romania was in fact an independent country, as opposed to the rest of the Warsaw Pact. To some extent, it was even more independent than Cuba (a communist Soviet-aligned state that was not a member of the Warsaw Pact). The Romanian regime was largely impervious to Soviet political influence, and Ceaușescu was the only declared opponent of glasnost and perestroika. On account of the contentious relationship between Bucharest and Moscow, the West did not hold the Soviet Union responsible for the policies pursued by Bucharest. This was not the case for the other countries in the region, such as Czechoslovakia and Poland. At the start of 1990, the Soviet foreign minister, Eduard Shevardnadze, implicitly confirmed the lack of Soviet influence over Ceaușescu's Romania. When asked whether it made sense for him to visit Romania less than two weeks after its revolution, Shevardnadze insisted that only by going in person to Romania could he figure out how to "restore Soviet influence".

Romania requested and obtained the complete withdrawal of the Soviet Army from its territory in 1958. The Romanian campaign for independence culminated on 22 April 1964 when the Romanian Communist Party issued a declaration proclaiming that: "Every Marxist–Leninist Party has a sovereign right...to elaborate, choose or change the forms and methods of socialist construction." and "There exists no "parent" party and "offspring" party, no "superior" and "subordinated" parties, but only the large family of communist and workers' parties having equal rights." and also "there are not and there can be no unique patterns and recipes". This amounted to a declaration of political and ideological independence from Moscow.

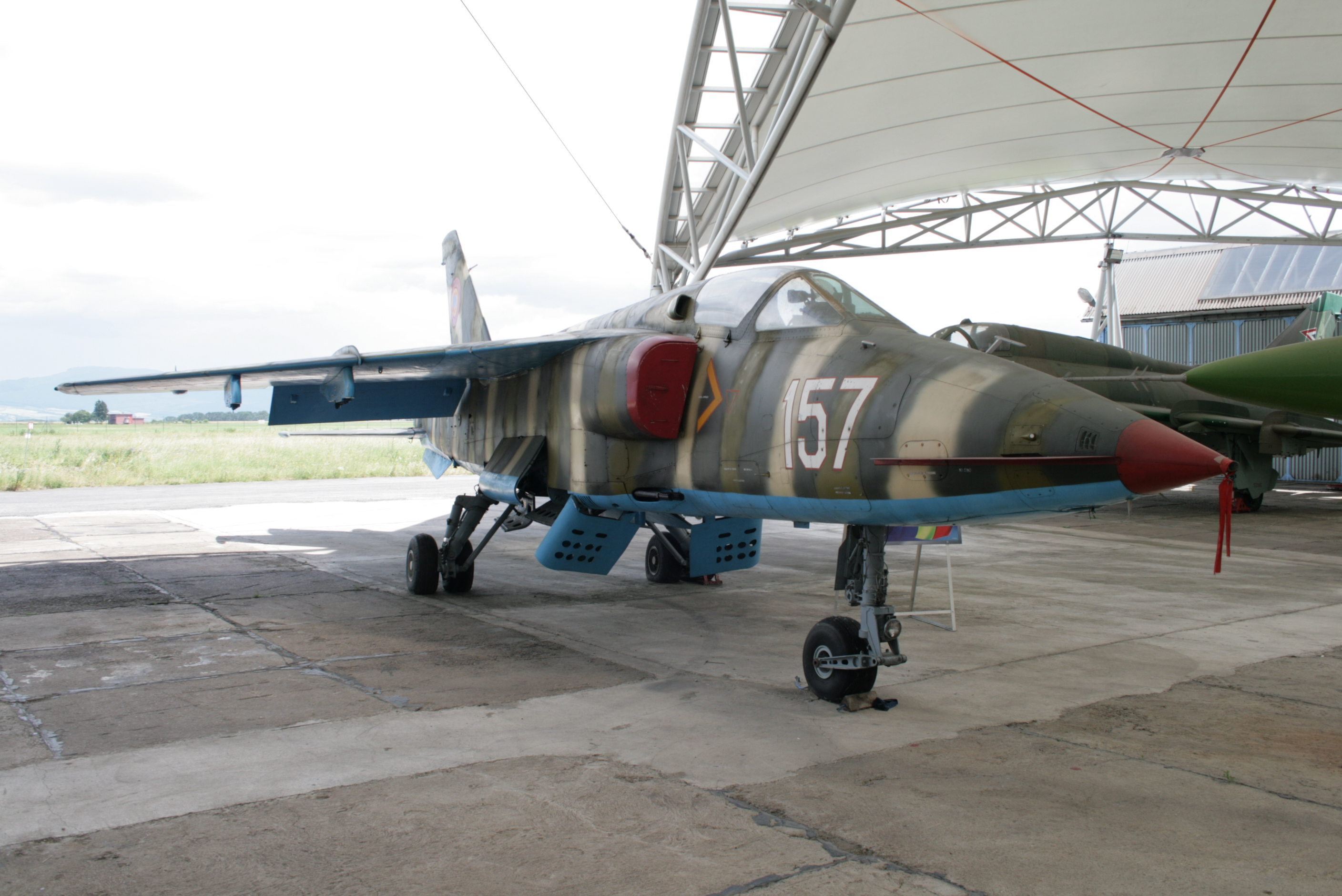
The Romanian IAR-93 Vultur was not the only combat jet designed and built by a non-Soviet member of the Warsaw Pact. See also Czechoslovak jet Aero L-39 Albatros.

Following Albania's withdrawal from the Warsaw Pact, Romania remained the only Pact member with an independent military doctrine which denied the Soviet Union use of its armed forces and avoided absolute dependence on Soviet sources of military equipment. Romania was the only non-Soviet Warsaw Pact member which was not obliged to militarily defend the Soviet Union in case of an armed attack. Bulgaria and Romania were the only Warsaw Pact members that did not have Soviet troops stationed on their soil. In December 1964, Romania became the only Warsaw Pact member (save Albania, which would leave the Pact altogether within 4 years) from which all Soviet advisors were withdrawn, including those in the intelligence and security services. Not only did Romania not participate in joint operations with the KGB, but it also set up "departments specialized in anti-KGB counterespionage".

Romania was neutral in the Sino-Soviet split. Its neutrality in the Sino-Soviet dispute along with being the small Communist country with the most influence in global affairs enabled Romania to be recognized by the world as the "third force" of the Communist world. Romania's independence – achieved in the early 1960s through its freeing from its Soviet satellite status – was tolerated by Moscow because Romania was not bordering the Iron Curtain – being surrounded by socialist states – and because its ruling party was not going to abandon communism.

Although certain historians such as Robert R. King and Dennis Deletant argue against the usage of the term "independent" to describe Romania's relations with the Soviet Union, favouring "autonomy" instead on account of the country's continued membership within both the Comecon and the Warsaw Pact along with its commitment to socialism, this approach fails to explain why in July 1963 Romania blocked Mongolia's accession to the Warsaw Pact, why in November 1963 Romania voted in favour of a UN resolution to establish a nuclear-free zone in Latin America when the other Soviet-aligned countries abstained, or why in 1964 Romania opposed the Soviet-proposed "strong collective riposte" against China (and these are examples solely from the 1963–1964 period). Soviet disinformation tried to convince the West that Ceaușescu's empowerment was a dissimulation in connivance with Moscow. To an extent this worked, as some historians came to see the hand of Moscow behind every Romanian initiative. For instance, when Romania became the only Eastern European country to maintain diplomatic relations with Israel, some historians have speculated that this was at Moscow's whim. However, this theory fails upon closer inspection. Even during the Cold War, some thought that Romanian actions were done at the behest of the Soviets, but Soviet anger at said actions was "persuasively genuine". In truth, the Soviets were not beyond publicly aligning themselves with the West against the Romanians at times.

== Strategy ==
The strategy behind the formation of the Warsaw Pact was driven by the desire of the Soviet Union to prevent Central and Eastern Europe being used as a base for its enemies. Its policy was also driven by ideological and geostrategic reasons. Ideologically, the Soviet Union arrogated the right to define socialism and communism and act as the leader of the global socialist movement. A corollary to this was the necessity of military intervention if a country appeared to be "violating" core socialist ideas, i.e. breaking away from the Soviet sphere of influence, explicitly stated in the Brezhnev Doctrine.

=== Notable military exercises ===
External videos
- Czechoslovak Military Parade "Shield-84" – Vojenská přehlídka ČSLA "Štít-84

- "Szczecin" (Poland, 1962)
- "Vltava" (Czechoslovakia, 1966)
- Operation "Rhodope" (Bulgaria, 1967)
- "Oder-Neisse" (East Germany, 1969)
- Shield 72 (Czechoslovakia, 1972)
- Shield 82 (Bulgaria, 1982)
- "Seven Days to the River Rhine," 1979 - command post exercise without field activity
- Przyjaźń 84 (Poland, 1984)
- Shield 84 (Czechoslovakia, 1984)

== NATO and Warsaw Pact: comparison of the two forces ==
=== NATO and Warsaw Pact forces in Europe ===
Data published by the two alliances (1988–1989)
	NATO estimates		Warsaw Pact estimates	
Type	NATO	Warsaw Pact	NATO	Warsaw Pact
Personnel	2,213,593	3,090,000	3,660,200	3,573,100
Combat aircraft	3,977	8,250	7,130	7,876
Total strike aircraft	NA	NA	4,075	2,783
Helicopters	2,419	3,700	5,720	2,785
Tactical missile launchers	NA	NA	136	1,608
Tanks	16,424	51,500	30,690	59,470
Anti-tank weapons	18,240	44,200	18,070	11,465
Armoured infantry fighting vehicles	4,153	22,400	46,900	70,330
Artillery	14,458	43,400	57,060	71,560
Other armoured vehicles	35,351	71,000		
Armoured vehicle launch bridges	454	2,550		
Air defence systems	10,309	24,400		
Submarines			200	228
Submarines (nuclear powered)			76	80
Large surface ships			499	102
Aircraft-carrying ships			15	2
Aircraft-carrying ships armed with cruise missiles			274	23
Amphibious warfare ships			84	24

== Post–Warsaw Pact ==
Expansion of NATO before and after the collapse of communism throughout Central and Eastern Europe

On 12 March 1999, the Czech Republic, Hungary, and Poland joined NATO; Bulgaria, Estonia, Latvia, Lithuania, Romania, Slovenia and Slovakia joined in March 2004; Croatia and Albania joined on 1 April 2009.

The Russian Federation and some other post-Soviet states joined the Collective Security Treaty Organization (CSTO) in 1992, and the Shanghai Five in 1996, which was renamed the Shanghai Cooperation Organisation (SCO) after Uzbekistan's addition in 2001.

In November 2005, the Polish government opened its Warsaw Treaty archives to the Institute of National Remembrance, which published some 1,300 declassified documents in January 2006, yet the Polish government reserved publication of 100 documents, pending their military declassification. Eventually, 30 of the reserved 100 documents were published; 70 remained secret and unpublished. Among the documents published was the Warsaw Treaty's nuclear war plan, Seven Days to the River Rhine – a short, swift invasion and capture of Austria, Denmark, Germany, and the Netherlands east of the Rhine – using nuclear weapons in response after a supposed NATO first strike.

== See also ==
- Eastern Bloc
- Finno-Soviet Treaty of 1948 – treaty that defined Finland's level of neutrality towards Soviet Union
  - Finlandization – the USSR's influence on Finland following the treaty
- Russosphere
- Soviet Empire
- Sovietization
- Bamboo curtain
- Treaty of friendship – any treaty establishing close ties between countries
