= Vasily Chuikov =

Soviet military commander (1900–1982)

- Василий Иванович Чуйков
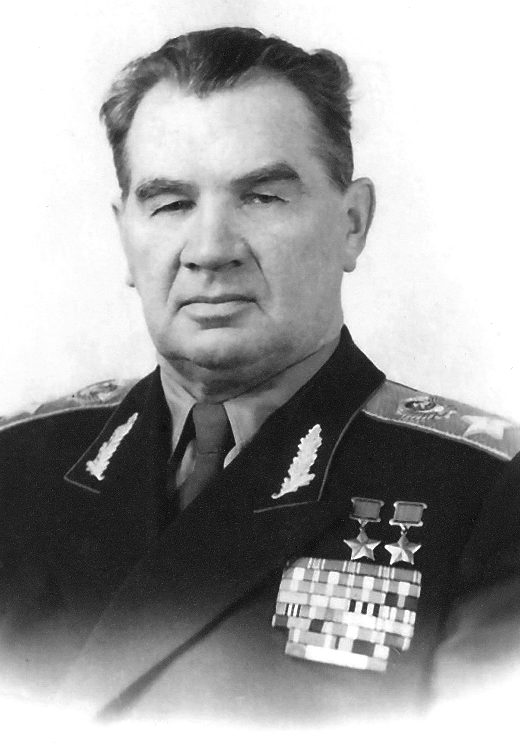
- Chuikov c. 1950s
- Born: 12 February 1900; Serebryanye Prudy, Russia
- Died: 18 March 1982 (aged 82); Moscow, Soviet Union
- Burial place: Mamayev Kurgan, Volgograd, Russia
- Military career
- Allegiance: Russian SFSR (1917–1922); Soviet Union (1922–1972)
- Service years: 1917–1972
- Rank: Marshal of the Soviet Union (1955–1972)
- Nicknames: "The Man of Iron Will" "The Stone"
- Commands: 4th Army; 64th Army; 62nd Army; 8th Guards Army; Group of Soviet Forces in Germany; Kiev Military District
- Conflicts: Russian Civil War; Polish–Soviet War; World War II; Soviet invasion of Poland; Winter War; Great Patriotic War; Battle of Stalingrad; Operation Bagration; Battle of Poznań; Battle of Berlin; Occupation of Germany
- Awards: Twice Hero of the Soviet Union; Distinguished Service Cross (United States)
- Other work: 1961 until his death, he was a member of the Central Committee of the Communist Party of the Soviet Union

Vasily Ivanovich Chuikov (Russian: Василий Иванович Чуйков, Russian: [vɐˈsʲilʲɪj t͡ɕʉjkof]; 12 February [O.S. 31 January] 1900 – 18 March 1982) was a Soviet military commander and Marshal of the Soviet Union. He is best known for commanding the 62nd Army which saw heavy combat during the Battle of Stalingrad in the Second World War and for being the commanding general to receive the surrender of the German troops defending Berlin.

Born to a peasant family near Tula, Chuikov earned his living as a factory worker from the age of 12. After the Russian Revolution of 1917, he joined the Red Army and distinguished himself during the Russian Civil War. After graduating from the Frunze Military Academy, Chuikov worked as a military attaché and intelligence officer in China and the Russian Far East. At the outbreak of the Second World War, Chuikov commanded the 4th Army during the Soviet invasion of Poland, and the 9th Army during the Winter War against Finland. In December 1940, he was again appointed military attaché to China in support of Chiang Kai-shek and the Nationalists in the war against Japan.

In March 1942, Chuikov was recalled from China to defend against the German invasion of the Soviet Union. By September, he was assigned command of the 62nd Army in defense of Stalingrad. Tasked with holding the city at all costs, Chuikov adopted keeping the Soviet front-line positions as close to the Germans as physically possible. This served as an effective countermeasure against the Wehrmacht's combined-arms tactics, but by mid-November 1942 the Germans had captured most of the city after months of slow advance. In late November Chuikov's 62nd Army joined the rest of the Soviet forces in a counter-offensive, which led to the surrender of the German 6th Army in early 1943. After Stalingrad, Chuikov led his forces into Poland during Operation Bagration and the Vistula–Oder Offensive before advancing on Berlin. He personally accepted the unconditional surrender of German forces in Berlin on 2 May 1945.

After the war, Chuikov served as Commander-in-Chief of the Group of Soviet Forces in Germany (1949–53), commander of the Kiev Military District (1953–60), Chief of the Soviet Armed Forces and Deputy Minister of Defense (1960–64), and head of the Soviet Civil Defense Forces (1961–72). Chuikov was twice awarded the titles Hero of the Soviet Union (1944 and 1945) and was awarded the Distinguished Service Cross by the United States for his actions during the Battle of Stalingrad. In 1955, he was named a Marshal of the Soviet Union. Following his death in 1982, Chuikov was interred at the Stalingrad memorial at Mamayev Kurgan, which had been the site of heavy fighting.

== Early life ==
Born into a peasant family in the village of Serebryanye Prudy in the Tula region south of Moscow, Chuikov was the eighth of 12 children and the fifth of eight sons. At the age of 12, he left school and his family home to earn his living in a factory in Saint Petersburg, turning out spurs for cavalry officers. Chuikov and all his brothers became soldiers and fought in the Russian Civil War.

== Early military career ==
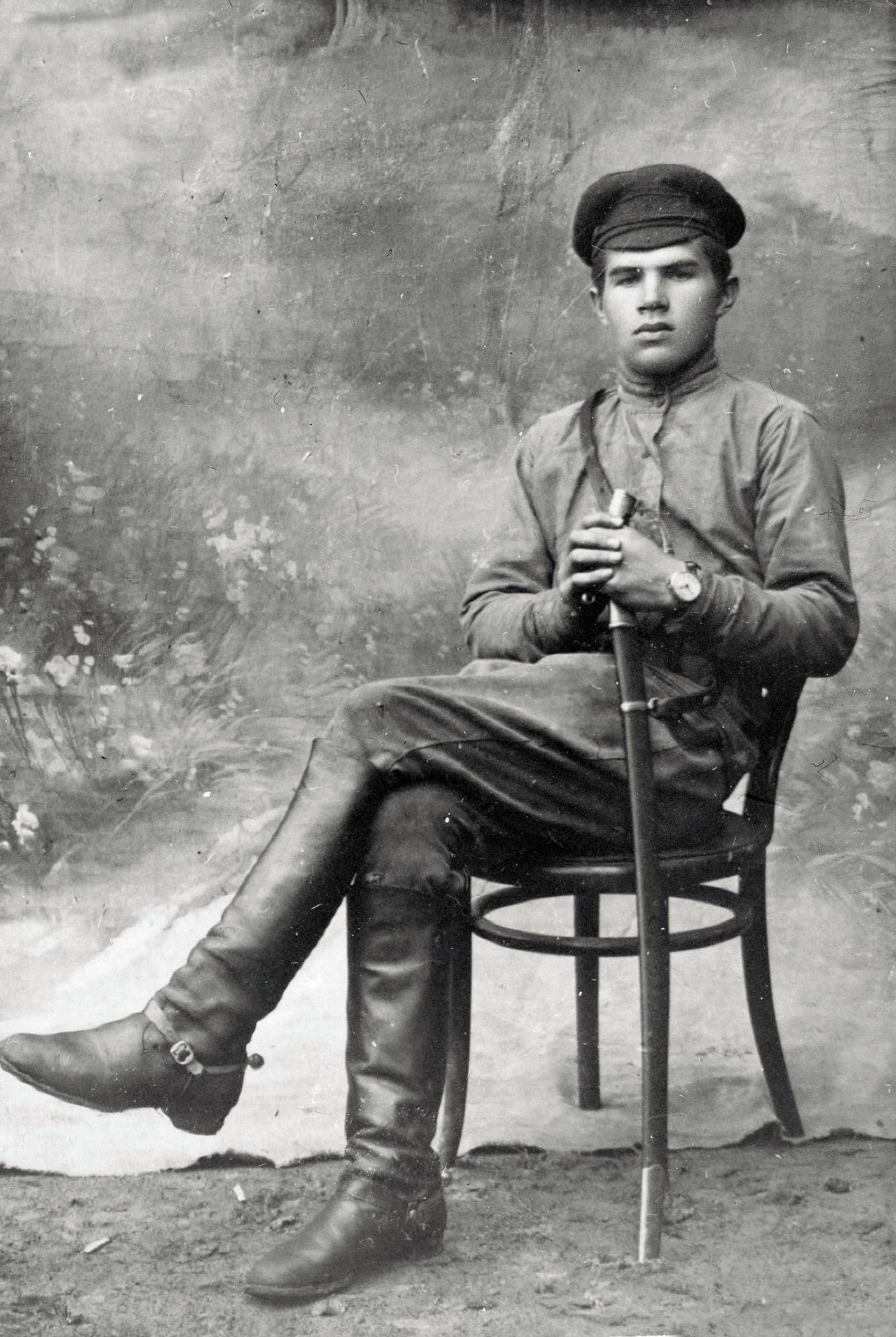
Chuikov in uniform c. 1918–1919

During the turmoil of the Russian Revolution of 1917, Chuikov became unemployed. Later the same year, an older brother arranged for Chuikov to be recruited into the Red Guards. The year after, in 1918, he joined the Red Army.

In October 1918, Chuikov saw active service when he was sent to the Southern Front as a deputy company commander to fight against the White Army. In the spring of 1919, he became commander of the 40th Regiment (later renamed the 43rd), part of the 5th Army under Tukhachevsky facing the White Army under Kolchak in Siberia.

Chuikov's record of service during the Civil War was distinguished. In the fighting from 1919 to 1920 he received two awards of the Order of the Red Banner for bravery and heroism. He was wounded four times—one, in Poland in 1920, left a fragment in his left arm that could not be operated on. It led to partial paralysis and caused him to lose use of his arm temporarily. Chuikov carried this war wound for the rest of his life, and it eventually led to septicaemia breaking out in 1981, causing a nine-month illness and finally his death.

He left his regiment in 1921 to continue his studies at the Frunze Military Academy, from which he graduated in 1925. On account of his excellent academic performance, Chuikov was invited to stay at the Frunze Military Academy for another year to study Chinese language and history in the Orient Studies Department. In the fall of 1926, Chuikov joined a Soviet diplomatic delegation that toured Harbin, Changchun, Port Arthur, Dalian, Tianjin and Beijing, cities in northeastern and northern China. After completing his studies in the fall of 1927, Chuikov was dispatched to China as a military attaché. Chuikov traveled extensively in southern China and Sichuan, became fluent in Chinese, and gained a deeper understanding of Chinese politics and culture. In 1929, during the China Eastern Railway Incident, Chuikov was forced to leave China after the Soviet Union broke diplomatic relations with the Republic of China on 13 July. Chuikov was assigned to the newly formed Special Red Banner Far Eastern Army in Khabarovsk and worked on military intelligence, reporting to Vasily Blyukher, the commander of the Far Eastern Army. The Soviet Far Eastern Army defeated the Northeastern Army of Zhang Xueliang, and Chuikov participated in negotiations that restored Soviet control of the China Eastern Railway.

== World War II ==
Chuikov commanded the 4th Army in the Soviet invasion of Poland in 1939. He commanded the 9th Army in the Russo-Finnish War of 1940.

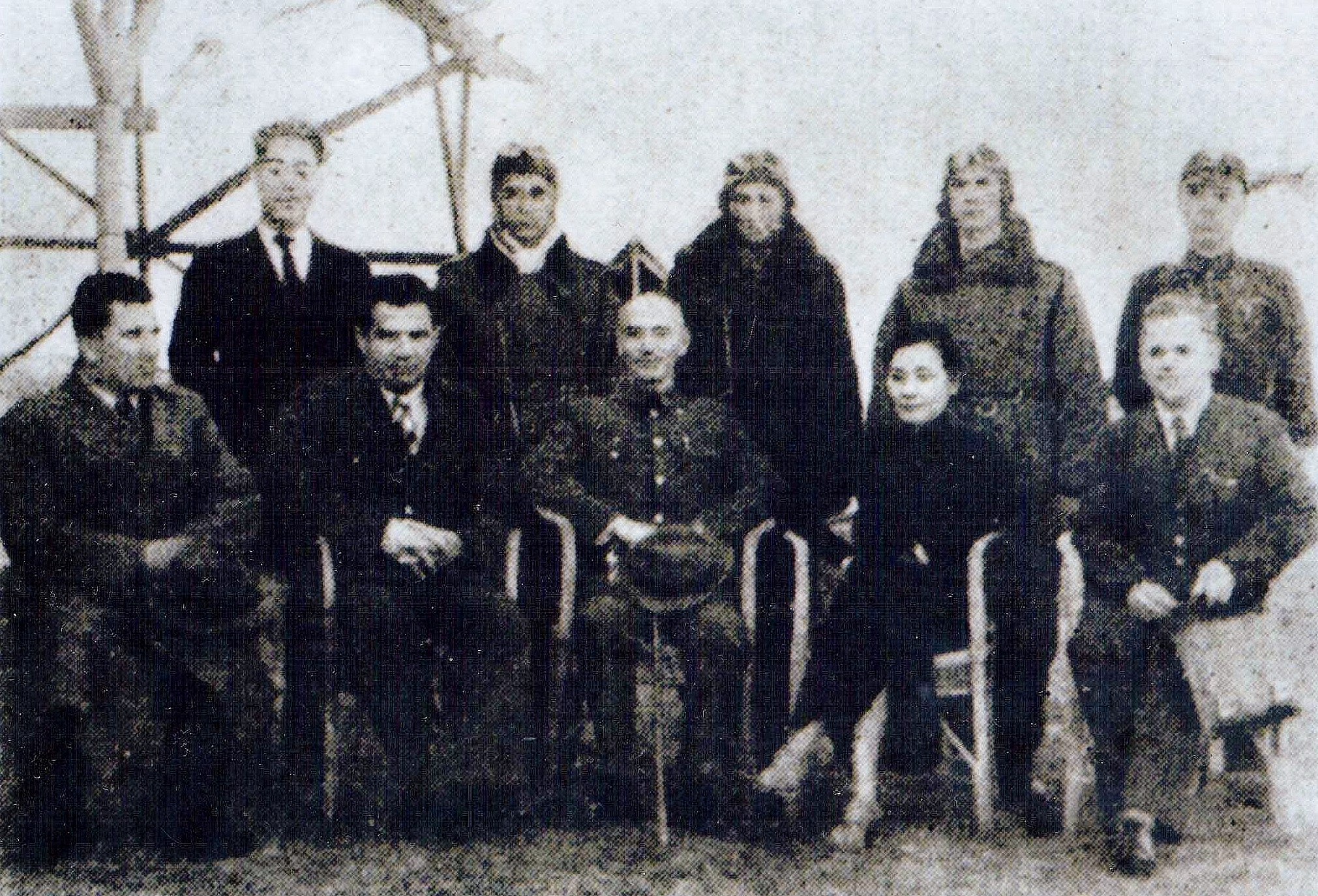
Chuikov (front row, second from left) with Generalissimo Chiang Kai-shek (front row, center), during his time in China as the chief Soviet military advisor, 1941.

In December 1940, Chuikov was appointed the chief Soviet military representative to the Republic of China and adviser to Chiang Kai-shek, the Nationalist leader, in Chongqing. Prior to his departure for China, he was summoned to meet Joseph Stalin and Semyon Timoshenko, who instructed him to ensure that China remain engaged in the war with Japan so Japan could not challenge the Soviet Union in the Far East and allow the Soviet Union to focus on the German threat from the West. Stalin told Chuikov to prioritize support for Nationalists over the Chinese Communists so as to ensure Chinese unity against Japan. Chuikov arrived in China with a large supply of Soviet armaments for the Nationalist Army, including tanks, artillery, fighter and bomber aircraft, and trucks. In January 1941 when the Nationalists attacked the communist New Fourth Army in the Southern Anhui Incident in breach of their nominal alliance, Chuikov was criticized by Mao Zedong for failing to stop Chiang's armed betrayal. Chuikov insisted that the Nationalists could not use Soviet weaponry against the Communists, met with Communist leaders Zhou Enlai and Ye Jianying, but in keeping with Stalin's directives, continued to support the Nationalist war effort against Japan, even after the signing of the Soviet–Japanese Neutrality Pact in April 1941. In the Second Battle of Changsha in September 1941, he advised Chiang to relieve the Japanese siege on Changsha by attacking the strategic city of Yichang some 400 km to the north, and the strategy succeeded. In March 1942, he was recalled to the USSR, which by then was at war with Germany.

=== Battle of Stalingrad ===
On 11 September 1942, General Chuikov was summoned to South Western Front Headquarters to discuss the defense of Stalingrad. In a meeting with South Western Front Commander Lieutenant General Andrey Yeryomenko and Commissar Nikita Khrushchev, Chuikov was appointed as commander of 62nd Army and charged with the defense of the city of Stalingrad itself, directly on the western bank of the Volga River. Chuikov would later recount this in a 1943 interview:

"… I was told that I was to take command of 62nd Army. My mission: defend Stalingrad. …After Nikita Sergeyevich [Khrushchev] told me to go to Stalingrad, he asked me: "What are your thoughts?" Yeryomenko also wanted to know. He's known me a long time. Well, what could I say? I said: "I understand my orders just fine, and I'll carry them out. I'll do what I can. I'll either keep them out of Stalingrad or die trying". There were no more questions after that. They offered me tea, but I declined, got in my car, and drove to Stalingrad."

Chuikov arrived in Stalingrad on 11 September 1942 and occupied Hill 102.24 where he set up his command post, and immediately set about preparing the defense of Stalingrad proper. The 62nd Army in Stalingrad faced threat of envelopment by fast-moving panzer and motorized infantry elements of German 6th Army. In the north, a German strike-force advanced out of the west via Kalach on the Don to a point located just north of Spartakovka and Rynok, and in the south a second strike-force advanced from out of the west toward the Tsimlyanskaya and Kotelnikovo axes. Along the front from Kuporosnoye and Orlovka to Rynok, General Chuikov defended against a German main thrust advancing from the northwest and directed at both Gumrak Airfield as well also the train station in the center of the town, and a second additional German strike-force advancing from the southwest directed against Olshanka and the grain elevator. General Chuikov enacted Joseph Stalin's order no. 227 "not one step back" and immediately stabilized the threatened 62nd Army.

"When I got to army headquarters I was in a vile mood. I only saw three people: comrade Gurov, Chief of Staff Krylov, and Chief of Artillery Pozharsky. Three of my deputies had fled to the east bank. But the main thing was that we had no dependable combat units, and we needed to hold out for three or four days. The divisions had their respective headquarters on the Volga, and we were still forward on this hill. We were in this tunnel alongside the Tsaritsa River, while all the command posts were farther back. This turned out to be the right decision. And then there's one thing that went well, if we can use such a word. We immediately began to take the harshest possible actions against cowardice. On the 14th (September) I shot the commander and commissar of one regiment, and a short while later I shot two brigade commanders and their commissars. This caught everyone off guard. We made sure news of this got to the men, especially the officers. If you go down to the Volga, they said, then you'll find Army HQ right ahead of you. And so they went back to their places. If I'd gone across the Volga myself, they'd have shot me when I got ashore, and they'd have been right. The needs of the day determine what needs to be done."

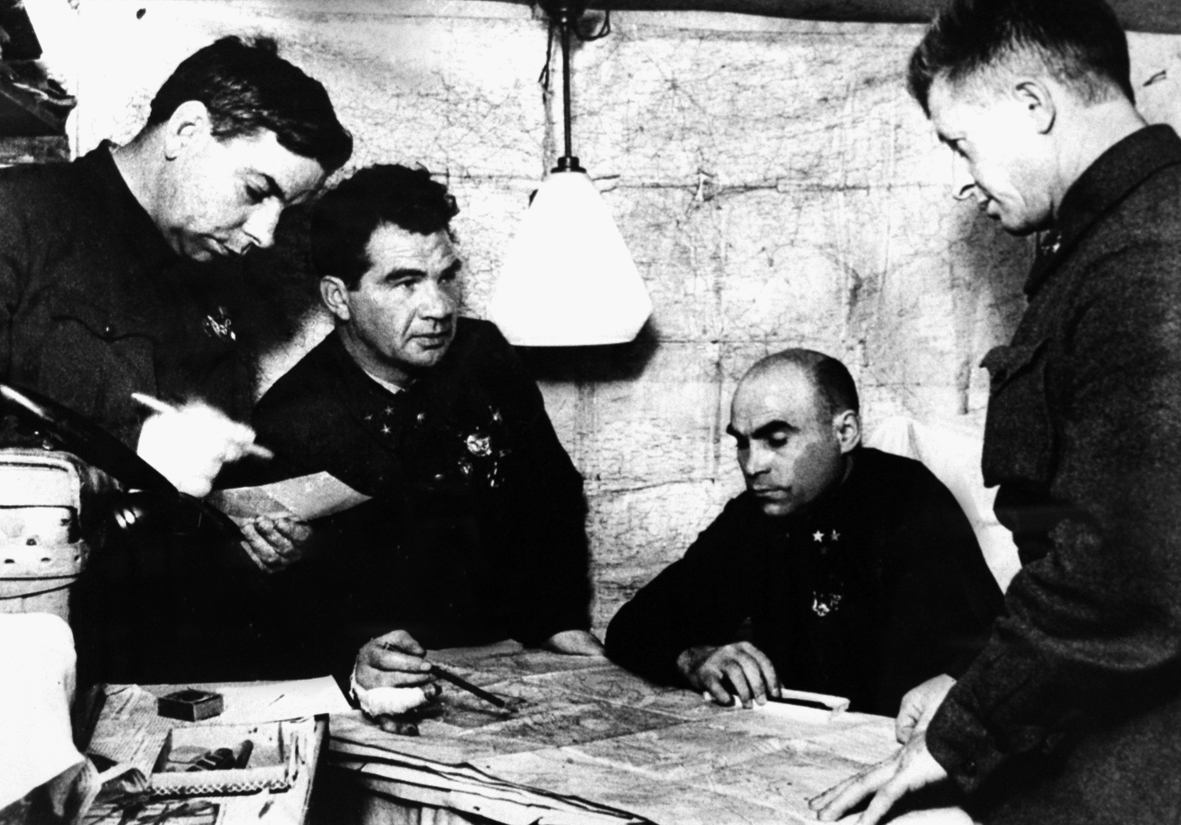
Chuikov at the 62nd Army command post in Stalingrad in December 1942.

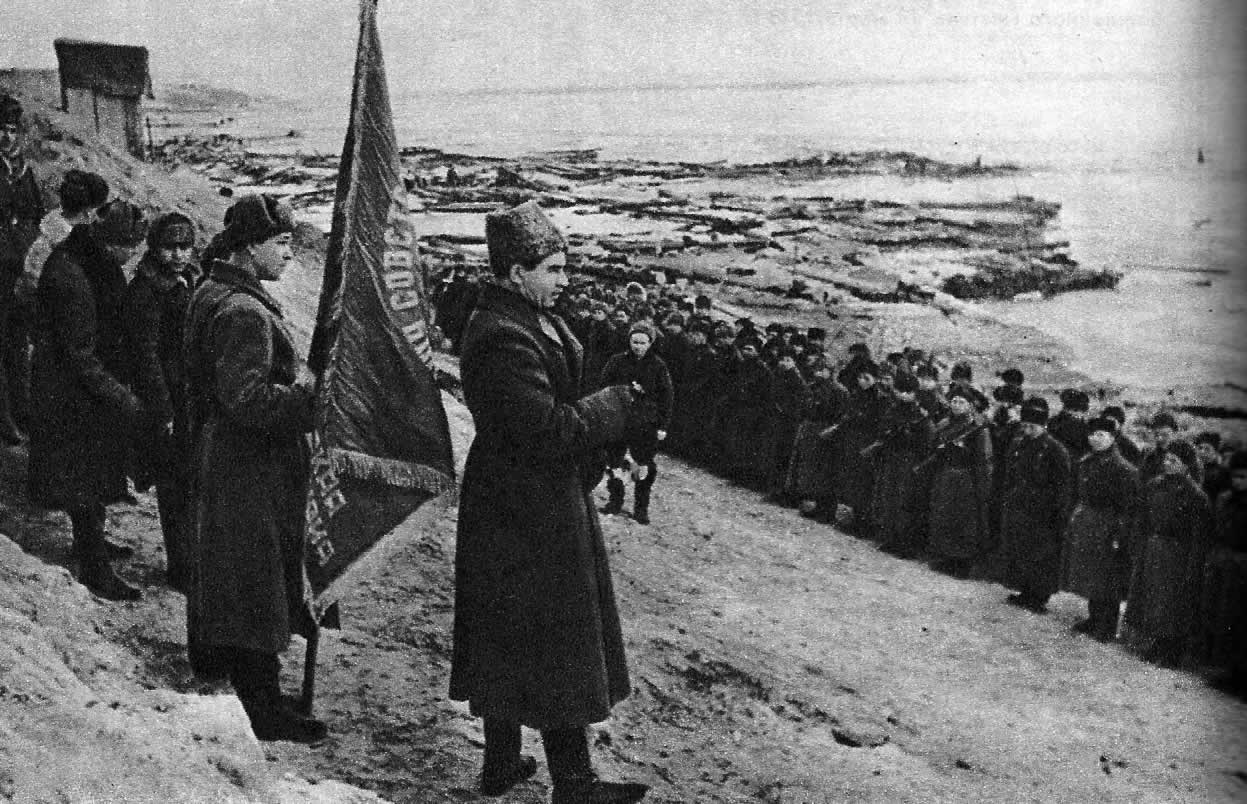
Chuikov presenting the guards banner of the 39th Guards Rifle Division in Stalingrad in January 1943

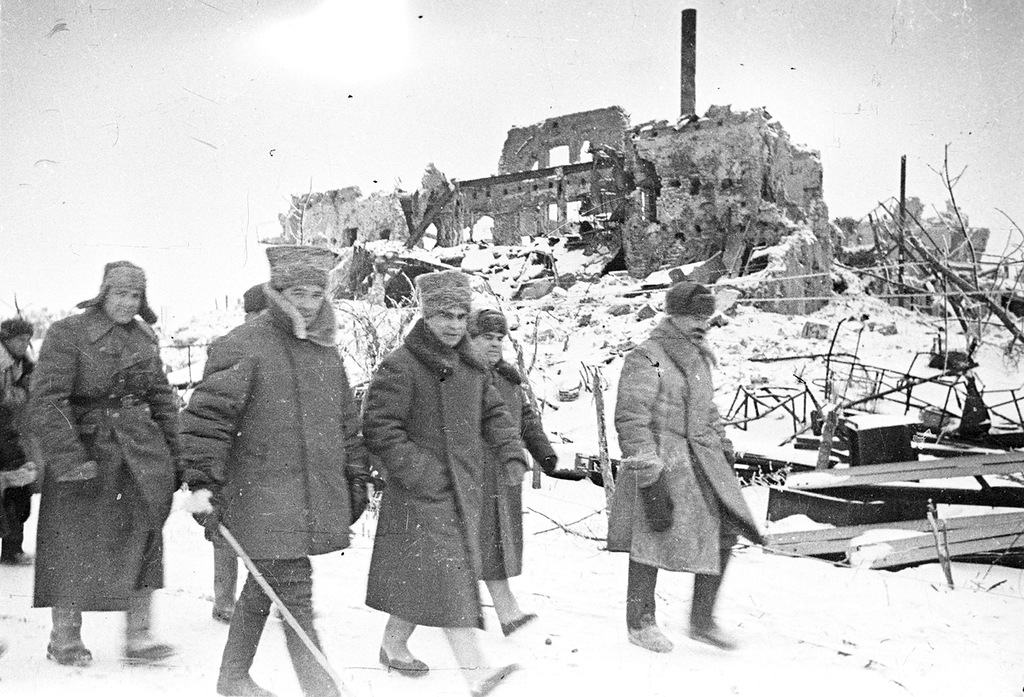
Chuikov, holding a stick, amidst the ruins of Stalingrad in 1943.

Chuikov was concerned about maintaining communications with his troops.

"We moved to another command post closer to where the enemy would be attacking. And we stayed there. We knew that every extra meter of telephone wires increased the risk of our communications being broken. The most criminal, most dangerous thing for a commander, especially a senior commander, is when you lose control and communications. Most of all, we were afraid of losing control of our troops. I may not be able to send one of my commanders any reinforcements, but it's enough for me to grab the phone and say the right thing, that's all he needs."

It was at Stalingrad that Chuikov developed the important tactic of "hugging the enemy", by which Soviet soldiers kept the German army so close to them as to minimize the airpower enjoyed by the Wehrmacht. Chuikov had witnessed firsthand the blitzkrieg tactics the Wehrmacht had used to sweep across the Russian steppe, so he used the Germans' carpet-bombing of the city to draw panzer units into the rubble and chaos, where their progress was impeded. Here they could be destroyed with Molotov cocktails, antitank rifles, and Soviet artillery operating at close range. This tactic also rendered the Luftwaffe ineffective, since Stuka dive-bombers could not attack Red Army positions without endangering their own forces.

"Our soldiers knew that the closer they were to the enemy, the better. They stopped being afraid of tanks. The infantrymen would get in a trench, ravine, or building, and start shooting the enemy infantry who were advancing behind the tanks. The tanks would move through, and we'd leave them to our artillery, which was two to three hundred meters back from the front lines and would fire when they came within twenty to fifty meters. And we didn't let their infantry through. The Germans would think that this area was already cleared, that it was dead ground. But that dead ground came back to life. And we had our Katyushas and artillery."

The fierce defense of Stalingrad by the 62nd Army slowed the German advance and forced Axis forces to pull units from the flanks outside the city to reinforce the urban assault. By mid-November, German forces had taken most of the city and pinned Chuikov and the remaining defenders in several small pockets against the Volga River. In interviews in 1943, Chuikov said he was not informed of the Operation Uranus counter-offensive but could sense one was being planned.

"We had sensed that our high command was preparing a major attack, but we didn't know where exactly. We had sensed this from the very beginning of November. We were being given less and less help. We'd been used to talking to people from front HQ every day, but now they'd all vanished. Khrushchev wasn't here, and Yeryomenko came only once..."

On 19 November 1942, Soviet forces launched a massive double pincer attack to the north and south of Stalingrad, exploiting the weakened Axis flanks and encircling the German Sixth Army, part of the Fourth Army and the Romanian Third and Fourth Armies in a vast pocket stretching nearly 80 km from Stalingrad to Kalach-on-Don. On 22 November, Chuikov's 62nd Army switched to an offensive posture, counter-attacking to recapture neighborhoods and preventing German forces from leaving the city to fight elsewhere in the pocket. The German Sixth Army surrendered on 2 February 1943.

=== Poland and Germany ===
"For the destruction of the garrison in Poznan, part of the forces of the 8th Guards, 69th Armies and the 1st Guards Tank Army were left. The capture of Poznan was personally entrusted to the commander of the 8th Guards Army, General V.I. Chuikov. At that time it was believed that no more than 20 thousand troops were surrounded there, but in reality there were more than 60 thousand of them ..."

— Georgy Zhukov – Marshal of the Soviet Union

After the victory at Stalingrad, the 62nd Army was redesignated the Soviet 8th Guards Army. Chuikov then commanded the 8th Guards as part of 1st Belorussian Front and led its advance through Poland. During the Vistula–Oder offensive, the troops of the 8th Guards under Chuikov participated in breaking the enemy's defense in depth, and liberated Majdanek concentration camp on the outskirts of the Polish city of Lublin. The 8th Guards liberated the city of Łódź, seized the fortress city of Poznań by storm, seized a bridgehead on the left bank of the Oder River and fought for two months to maintain and expand the bridgehead in the Kustrin area, before finally heading the Soviet offensive which conquered Berlin while the Western Allied forces were wiping out what was left in Southern and Western Germany in April/May 1945.

Chuikov's advance through Poland was characterized by massive advances across difficult terrain. (On several occasions, the 8th Guards Army advanced over 40 miles (64 km) in a single day.) On 1 May 1945, Chuikov, who commanded his army operating in central Berlin, was the first Allied officer to learn about Adolf Hitler's suicide, being informed by General Hans Krebs who had come to Chuikov's headquarters under a white flag. Krebs, under orders from Goebbels, sought conditions for surrender more favorable to the Germans, which Chuikov had no authority to grant and so rejected any terms. On 2 May, he accepted the unconditional surrender of Berlin's forces from General Helmuth Weidling who had taken command, with the suicide that morning by Gen. Krebs.

Chuikov appeared in the documentary film Berlin (1945), directed by Yuli Raizman.

== Later life ==
After the war, Chuikov continued to command the 8th Guards Army in Germany, later serving as Commander-in-Chief of the Group of Soviet Forces in Germany from 1949 until 1953, when he was made commander of the Kiev Military District. While serving at that post, on 11 March 1955 he was promoted to Marshal of the Soviet Union. From 1960 to 1964, he was the Commander-in-Chief of the Soviet Ground Forces. He also served as the Chief of the Civil Defense from 1961 until his retirement in 1972. From 1961 until his death, he was a member of the Central Committee of the Communist Party of the Soviet Union. In 1969, Chuikov led the Soviet delegation attending the funeral of Dwight D. Eisenhower.

He was a major consultant for the design of The Motherland Calls, a memorial on Mamayev Kurgan commemorating the Battle of Stalingrad, and was buried there after his death on 18 March 1982, at the age of 82. After Chuikov's death a piece of paper with a handwritten prayer was found among his belongings: "Oh, the One who can turn night into day and earth into a flower garden. Make every difficult thing easy for me. And help me".

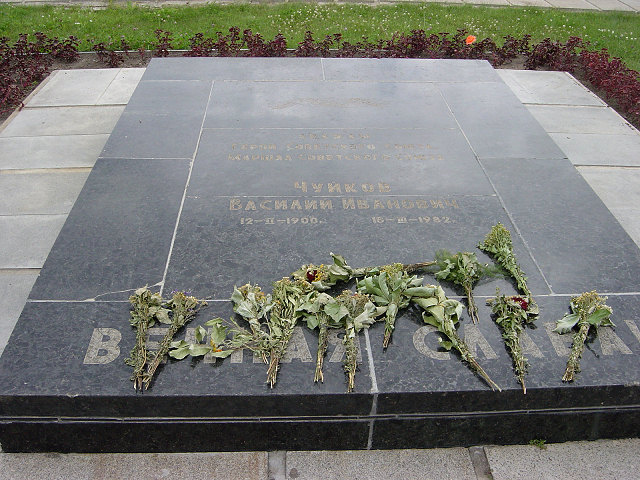
The tombstone of Marshal Vasily Chuikov

== Memoirs in translation ==
- The Beginning of the Road: The Story of the Battle for Stalingrad, London, 1963.
- Chuikov, Vasili (2003). Mission to China: Memoirs of a Soviet Military Adviser to Chiang Kaishek. Translated by Barrett, David P. Eastbridge. ISBN 978-1-891936-10-4.
- Chuikov, Vasili (1978). The End of the Third Reich. Moscow: Progress. ISBN 978-0-8285-0453-9.

== Honours and awards ==
USSR

Hero of the Soviet Union, twice (19 March 1944, 6 April 1945)
Order of Lenin, nine times (26 October 1943, 19 March 1944, 21 February 1945, 11 February 1950, 11 February 1960, 12 February 1970, 11 February 1975, 21 February 1978, 11 February 1980)
Order of the October Revolution (22 February 1968)
Order of the Red Banner, four times (1920, 1925, 1944, 1948)
Order of Suvorov, 1st class, three times (28 January 1943, 23 August 1944, 29 May 1945)
Order of the Red Star (1940)
Medal "For the Defence of Moscow"
Medal "For the Defence of Stalingrad"
Medal "For the Liberation of Warsaw"
Medal "For the Capture of Berlin"
Medal "For the Victory over Germany in the Great Patriotic War 1941–1945"
Medal "For the Victory over Japan"
Medal "Veteran of the Armed Forces of the USSR"
Medal "For Strengthening of Brotherhood in Arms"
Medal "For the Development of Virgin Lands"
Jubilee Medal "Twenty Years of Victory in the Great Patriotic War 1941–1945"
Jubilee Medal "Thirty Years of Victory in the Great Patriotic War 1941–1945"
Jubilee Medal "XX Years of the Workers' and Peasants' Red Army"
Jubilee Medal "30 Years of the Soviet Army and Navy"
Jubilee Medal "40 Years of the Armed Forces of the USSR"
Jubilee Medal "50 Years of the Armed Forces of the USSR"
Jubilee Medal "60 Years of the Armed Forces of the USSR"
Jubilee Medal "In Commemoration of the 100th Anniversary since the Birth of Vladimir Il'ich Lenin"
Medal "In Commemoration of the 800th Anniversary of Moscow"
Honorary weapon – sword inscribed with golden national emblem of the Soviet Union (22 February 1968)

- honorary citizen of Volgograd

Foreign

Patriotic Order of Merit in gold, twice (East Germany)
Grand Star of the Star of People's Friendship (East Germany)
Order of Sukhbaatar (Mongolian People's Republic)
Medal "For Victory over Japan" (Mongolian People's Republic)
Medal "30 year anniversary of the Victory over Japan" (Mongolian People's Republic)
Medal "30 year anniversary of the Battle of Khalkhin Gol" (Mongolian People's Republic)
Medal "40 year anniversary of the Battle of Khalkhin Gol" (Mongolian People's Republic)
Medal "50 years of the Mongolian People's Republic" (Mongolian People's Republic)
Medal "50 years of the Mongolian People's Army" (Mongolian People's Republic)
Grand Cross of the Virtuti Militari (Poland)
Commander's Cross of the Polonia Restituta, (Poland)
Cross of Grunwald, 2nd class (Poland)
Medal for Warsaw 1939–1945 (Poland)
Medal "For Oder, Neisse and the Baltic" (Poland)
Order of the Cloud and Banner with Special Grand Cordon (Republic of China)
Medal of Sino-Soviet Friendship (China)
Distinguished Service Cross (United States)

== See also ==
- Battle of Berezina
- German–Soviet military parade in Brest-Litovsk

== Bibliography ==
- Jones, Michael K. (2010). Stalingrad: How the Red Army Triumphed. UK: Pen & Sword Books. ISBN 978-1-84884-201-4.
