= Georgy Zhukov =

Soviet military leader (1896–1974)

- Георгий Жуков
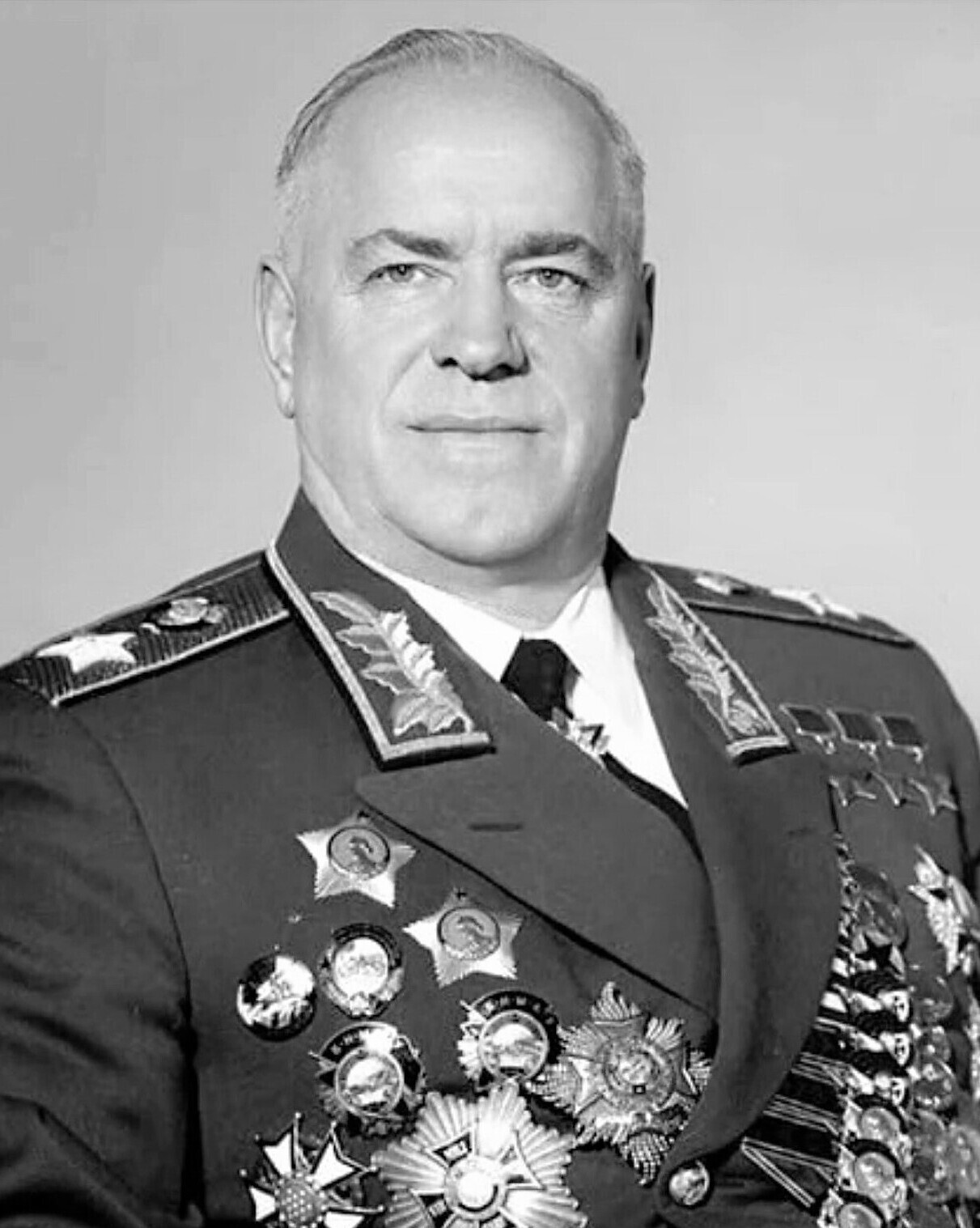
- Zhukov in 1960

Minister of Defence of the Soviet Union
- In office 9 February 1955 – 26 October 1957
- First Secretary: Nikita Khrushchev
- Preceded by: Nikolai Bulganin
- Succeeded by: Rodion Malinovsky
Additional positions
Member of the 20th Presidium of the CPSU
In office 27 February 1956 – 29 October 1957
Military Governor of Soviet Occupied Germany
In office 9 June 1945 – 21 March 1946
Preceded by	Office established
Succeeded by	Vasily Sokolovsky
Chief of the General Staff of the Red Army
In office 15 January 1941 – 29 July 1941
Preceded by	Kirill Meretskov
Succeeded by	Boris Shaposhnikov

Personal details
- Born: 1 December 1896 Strelkovka, Kaluga Governorate, Russian Empire
- Died: 18 June 1974 (aged 77) Moscow, Soviet Union
- Resting place: Kremlin Wall Necropolis
- Party: CPSU (1917–1957)
- Spouses: Alexandra Zuikova (m. 1953; div. 1965) Galina Semyonova (m. 1965; died 1973)
- Children: 4, including Varvara Zhukova
- Awards: Cross of Saint George (2); Hero of the Soviet Union (4); Hero of the Mongolian People's Republic; Order of Lenin (6); Order of Victory (2); Order of the October Revolution; Order of the Red Banner (3); Order of Suvorov (2); Legion of Merit (1)
- Nickname: Marshal of Victory

Military service
- Allegiance: Russian Empire; Russian SFSR; Soviet Union
- Branch: Imperial Russian Army; Soviet Red Army; Soviet Ground Forces
- Service years: 1915–1957
- Rank: Marshal of the Soviet Union (1943–1957)
- Commands: Kiev Military District; Odessa Military District; First Belorussian Front; Leningrad Front; Soviet Reserve Front; Soviet Western Front
- Wars: World War I; Brusilov Offensive; Russian Civil War; Spring Offensive; Tambov Rebellion; World War II; Soviet–Japanese border conflict; Battle of Khalkhin Gol; Great Patriotic War; Operation Barbarossa; Battle of Brody; Yelnya Offensive; Battle of Moscow; Battle of Stalingrad; Operation Uranus; Operation Mars; Siege of Leningrad; Operation Iskra; Operation Polar Star; Battle of Kursk; Operation Bagration; Baltic Offensive; Vistula–Oder Offensive; Battle of Berlin; Occupation of Germany; Hungarian Revolution

Georgy Konstantinovich Zhukov (Note: In this name that follows East Slavic naming customs, the patronymic is Konstantinovich and the family name is Zhukov.) (Note: Russian: Георгий Константинович Жуков, pronounced [ɡʲɪˈorɡʲɪj kənstɐnʲˈtʲinəvʲɪdʑ‿ˈʐukəf]) (1 December [O.S. 19 November] 1896 – 18 June 1974) was a Soviet military leader who served as a top commander during World War II and achieved the rank of Marshal of the Soviet Union. During World War II, Zhukov served as deputy commander-in-chief of the armed forces under leader Joseph Stalin, and oversaw some of the Red Army's most decisive victories. He also served at various points as Chief of the General Staff, Minister of Defence, and a member of the Presidium of the Central Committee of the Communist Party (Politburo).

Born to a poor peasant family near Moscow, Zhukov was conscripted into the Imperial Russian Army and fought in World War I. He served in the Red Army during the Russian Civil War, after which he quickly rose through the ranks. In summer 1939, Zhukov commanded a Soviet army group to a decisive victory over Japanese forces at the Battles of Khalkhin Gol, for which he won the first of his four Hero of the Soviet Union awards. In February 1941, Stalin appointed Zhukov as chief of the General Staff of the Red Army.

Following the German invasion of the Soviet Union in June 1941, Zhukov lost his post as chief of staff after disagreeing with Stalin over the defense of Kiev. Zhukov, often in collaboration with Aleksandr Vasilevsky, was subsequently involved in the Soviet actions at Leningrad, Moscow, Stalingrad, and Kursk. He held the title of deputy commander-in-chief of the armed forces from August 1942, and was promoted to Marshal of the Soviet Union in January 1943. He participated in the planning of Operation Bagration in 1944, and in 1945 commanded the 1st Belorussian Front as it led the Vistula–Oder Offensive into Germany, where he oversaw the Soviet victory at the Battle of Berlin. In recognition of Zhukov's key role in the war, he was chosen to accept the German Instrument of Surrender and to inspect the 1945 Moscow Victory Parade. He also served as the first military governor of the Soviet occupation zone in Germany from 1945 to 1946.

After the war, Zhukov's popularity caused Stalin to see him as a potential threat. Stalin stripped him of his positions and relegated him to military commands of little strategic significance. After Stalin's death in 1953, Zhukov supported Nikita Khrushchev's bid for leadership, and in 1955, he was appointed Defence Minister and made a member of the Presidium. In 1957, Zhukov fell out of favour again and was forced to retire. He never returned to a top post, and died in 1974. Zhukov is remembered as one of the greatest Russian and Soviet military leaders of all time, along with Alexander Suvorov, Mikhail Barclay de Tolly, and Mikhail Kutuzov.

== Early life and career ==
Georgy Konstantinovich Zhukov was born into a poor Russian peasant family on 1 December [O.S. 19 November] 1896 in Strelkovka, a town then in the Maloyaroslavetsky Uyezd of the Kaluga Governorate of the Russian Empire and now in Kaluga Oblast, about 62 miles (100 km) east of Moscow. According to Geoffrey Roberts, Zhukov's mother, Ustin'ya, worked as a peasant labourer, while his father, Konstantin, was a cobbler who had been orphaned as a child and later adopted by Anuska Zhukova. Zhukov completed a three-year primary education course and was then apprenticed to his maternal uncle as a furrier in Moscow.

While working in Moscow, Zhukov continued his education through reading and night-school classes as his work schedule allowed. He completed his apprenticeship in 1912 and continued to work for his uncle and master, a role which included three young employees under his leadership.

=== World War I ===
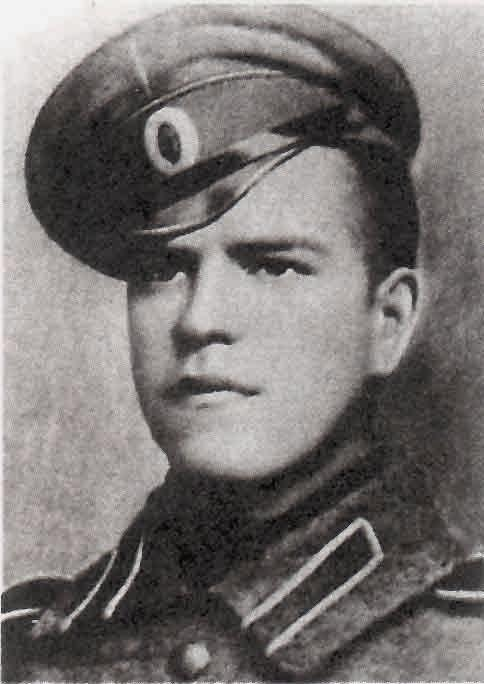
Non-commissioned officer Georgy Zhukov, Russian Imperial Army, 1916

In 1915, Zhukov was conscripted into the Imperial Russian Army and served in the 10th Dragoon Novgorod Regiment; in October 1916 he was wounded by a land mine explosion. During World War I, he received the Cross of St. George twice and was promoted to non-commissioned officer ranks.

After the 1917 October Revolution, he joined the Russian Communist Party (Bolsheviks). Following a severe bout of typhus, he fought in the Russian Civil War, serving in a cavalry formation commanded by Semyon Timoshenko that was later absorbed into the 1st Cavalry Army led by Semyon Budyonny. He completed an officers' cavalry training course in 1920 and was commissioned. In 1921, he was awarded the Order of the Red Banner in connection with operations against the Tambov Rebellion.

=== Interwar period ===
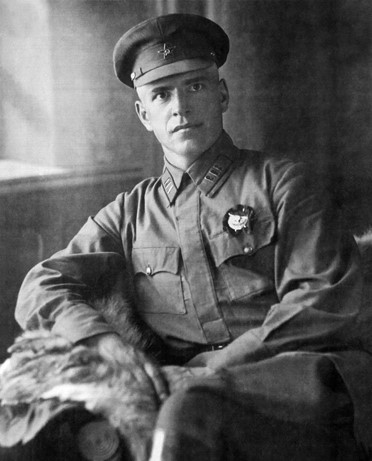
Zhukov as a regimental commander, 1920s

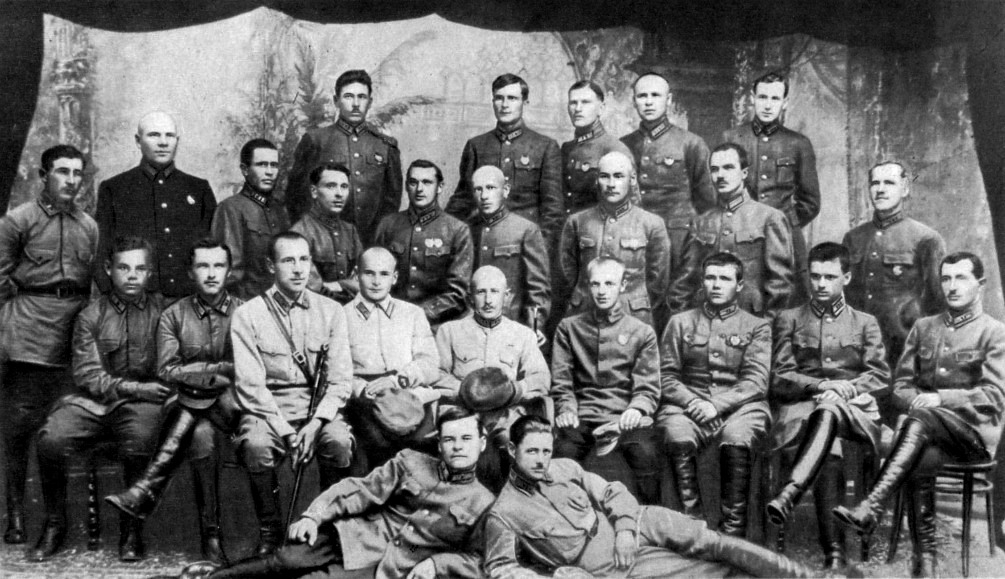
Graduates of the Leningrad Higher Cavalry School (1924/25). Standing in the third row (right to left): 1. Zhukov, 5. Rokossovsky.

Zhukov advanced through cavalry command positions in the 1920s, including troop and squadron command and deputy regimental command. In late May 1923, he was appointed commander of the 39th Cavalry Regiment. He entered the Higher School of Cavalry in 1924 and graduated in 1925, returning to command the same regiment.

He began studies at the Frunze Military Academy in 1929 and graduated in 1930. In May 1930, he became commander of the 2nd Cavalry Brigade of the 7th Cavalry Division. In February 1931, he was appointed Assistant Inspector of Cavalry for the Red Army. In May 1933, he was appointed commander of the 4th Cavalry Division. He later commanded the 3rd Cavalry Corps and the 6th Cavalry Corps. In 1938, he became deputy cavalry commander of the Belorussian Military District.

Some accounts alleged that Zhukov received training in Germany during the 1920s as part of Soviet–German military cooperation; this claim has appeared in later memoir and intelligence-report literature and remains dependent on the reliability of those sources.

=== Khalkhin Gol ===
In 1938, Zhukov was assigned to command Soviet forces operating with the Mongolian People's Army against Japan’s Kwantung Army along the border between the Mongolian People's Republic and Japanese-controlled Manchukuo, during the Soviet–Japanese border conflicts of 1938–1939. The fighting culminated in the Battle of Khalkhin Gol (1939). On 20 August 1939, Zhukov launched a major offensive supported by armour and air power; by the end of August, Japanese forces had been pushed from the contested area and the Soviet–Mongolian side secured control of the disputed border zone.

Coox notes that the campaign involved large-scale combined-arms manoeuvre, including encirclement operations using armoured formations and supporting artillery and infantry. The fighting also exposed technical and operational problems with Soviet armoured vehicles, including issues affecting the BT-5 and BT-7 series, and subsequent assessments informed later Soviet armoured development and training practices. For his role in the victory, Zhukov was named a Hero of the Soviet Union. In May 1940, he was promoted to general of the army.

== World War II ==
=== Before the War ===
==== Pre-war military exercises ====
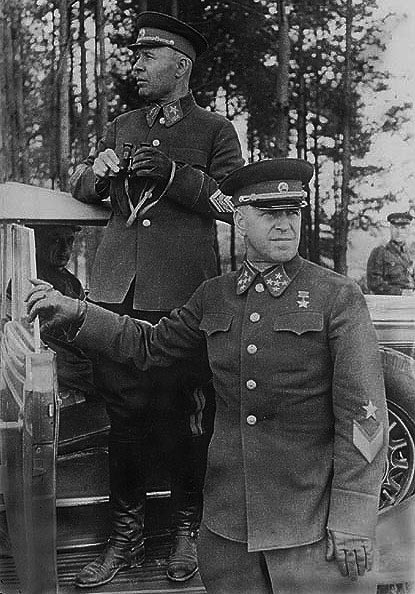
Zhukov and Semyon Timoshenko in 1940

In the autumn of 1940, Zhukov started preparing plans for the military exercise concerning the defence of the Western border of the Soviet Union. It had been pushed further to the west after the Soviet Union annexed eastern Poland and the Baltic republics. In his memoirs, Zhukov reports that in this exercise, he commanded the Western or Blue forces—the supposed invasion troops—and his opponent was Colonel General Dmitry Pavlov, the commander of the Eastern or Red forces—the supposed Soviet troops. He noted that Blue had 60 divisions, while Red had 50 divisions. Zhukov describes the exercise as being similar to events that later took place during the German invasion.

In this military exercise, I commanded Blue forces representing the Germans, while Pavlov, the commander of Western Military District, commanded the Red forces representing our army [...] After knowing the original documents and the real number of German forces, when commanding the Blue forces, I had the attacks developed into three directions, that in the following event the Germans also attacked us in the same manners. Our main main strikes at that time were also similar to the main strikes of the Germans later. The army groups built were also nearly similar to the army groups that the Germans formed during the war. [...] Comrade [Stalin] asked why the Blue forces were so powerful, why the original documents of the military exercise allocated too many large forces for the German. He was told that such forces corresponded to the German capability and the real calculation about the potential forces that the German could unleash after they managed to achieve great superiority on the main axes. That sufficiently showed why the Blue forces could make strong advances during the military exercise.

Russian historian Bobylev noted that the details of the exercises were reported differently by the various participants who published memoirs. He said that there were two exercises; one from 2 to 6 January 1941, for the North-West direction; another from 8 to 11 January, for the South-West direction. During the first, Western forces attacked Eastern forces on 15 July, but the Eastern forces counterattacked and, by 1 August, reached the original border.

At the time, the Eastern forces had a numerical advantage: 51 infantry divisions against 41; 8,811 tanks against 3,512—with the exception of anti-tank guns. Bobylev describes how by the end of the exercise, the Eastern forces did not manage to surround and destroy the Western forces. In their turn, the Western forces threatened to surround the Eastern forces. The same historian reported that the second game was won by the Easterners, meaning that on the whole, both games were won by the side commanded by Zhukov. However, he noted that the games had a serious disadvantage since they did not consider an initial attack by Western forces, but only an attack by Eastern forces from the initial border.

According to Marshal Aleksandr Vasilevsky, the war-game defeat of Pavlov's Red Troops against Zhukov was not widely known. The victory of Zhukov's Blue Troops was widely publicized, which created a popular illusion of easy success for a preemptive offensive. On 1 February 1941, Zhukov became chief of the Red Army's General Staff. He was also elected a candidate member of the Central Committee of the Communist Party of the Soviet Union In February 1941, and was appointed a Deputy People's Commissar for Defence in March.

==== Soviet offensive controversy ====
From 2 February 1941, as the chief of the general staff, and Deputy Minister of Defense, Zhukov was said to take part in drawing up the "Strategic plan for deployment of the forces of the Soviet Union in the event of war with Germany and its allies." The plan was completed no later than 15 May 1941, according to a dated document found in the Soviet archives after they were declassified in the 1990s. Some researchers, such as Victor Suvorov, have theorized that on 14 May, Soviet People's Commissar of Defense Semyon Timoshenko and General Zhukov presented these plans to Stalin for a preemptive attack against Germany through Southern Poland.

Soviet forces would occupy the Vistula Border and continue to Katowice or even Berlin—should the main German armies retreat—or the Baltic coast, should German forces not retreat and be forced to protect Poland and East Prussia. The attacking Soviets were supposed to reach Siedlce, Dęblin, and then capture Warsaw before penetrating toward the southwest and imposing final defeat at Lublin.

Historians do not have the original documents that could verify the existence of such a plan, and there is no evidence that Stalin accepted it. In a transcript of an interview on 26 May 1965, Zhukov said that Stalin did not approve the plan. But Zhukov did not clarify whether execution was attempted. As of 1999, no other approved plan for a Soviet attack had been found.

On 10 June 1941, Zhukov sent a message to the Military Council of the Kiev Special Military District, after someone, most likely the commander of the Kiev district, Mikhail Kirponos, had ordered troops on the border to occupy forward positions. Zhukov ordered: "Such action could provoke the Germans into armed confrontation fraught with all sorts of consequences. Revoke this order immediately and report who, specifically, gave such an unauthorised order." On 11 June, he sent a telegram saying that his immediate superior, Timoshenko, had ordered that they were to report back by 16 June confirming that the troops had been withdrawn from their forward positions." According to the historian David E. Murphy, "the action by Timoshenko and Zhukov must have been initiated at the request of Stalin."

David Glantz and Jonathan House, American scholars of the Red Army, argue that "the Soviet Union was not ready for war in June 1941, nor did it intend, as some have contended, to launch a preventative war." Gerhard Weinberg, a scholar of Nazi foreign policy, supports their view, arguing that Adolf Hitler's decision to launch Operation Barbarossa was not because of a sense of urgent foreboding, but rather from a "purposeful determination" and he had started his planning for the invasion well in advance of the summer of 1941.

=== The Eastern front ===
==== Germany invades the Soviet Union ====
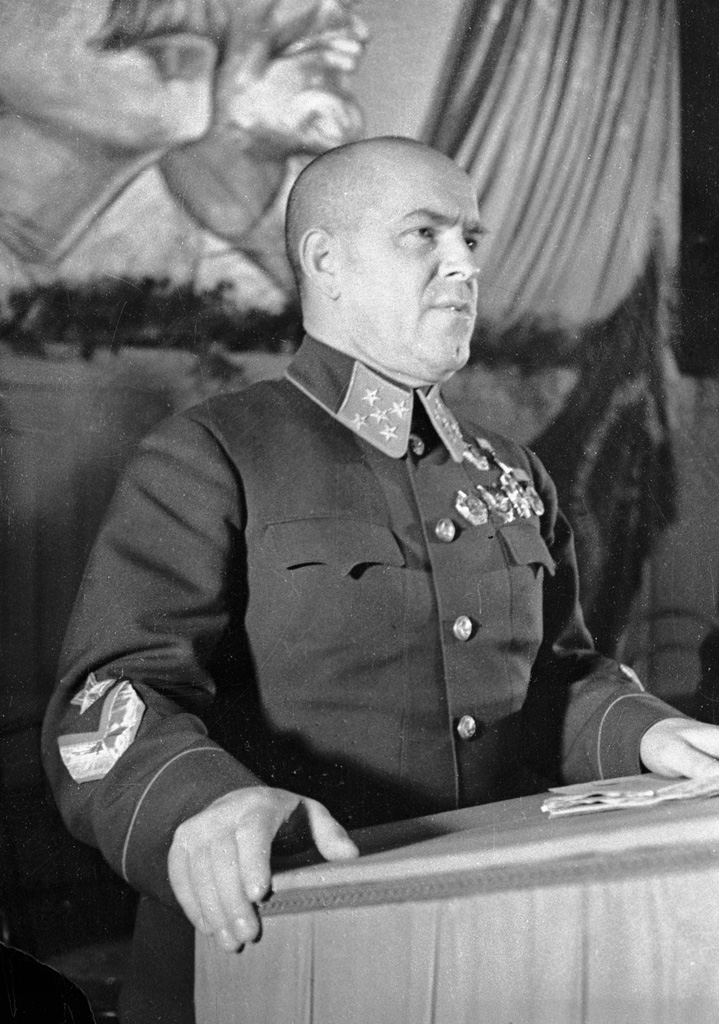
Zhukov speaking in 1941

On 22 June 1941, Germany launched Operation Barbarossa, an invasion of the Soviet Union. On the same day, Zhukov responded by signing the "Directive of Peoples' Commissariat of Defence No. 3", which ordered an all-out counteroffensive by Red Army forces. He commanded the troops to "encircle and destroy [the] enemy grouping near Suwałki and to seize the Suwałki region by the evening of 24 June" and "to encircle and destroy the enemy grouping invading in [the] Vladimir-Volynia and Brody direction" and even "to seize the Lublin region by the evening of 24 June". This manoeuvre failed and disorganized Red Army units were destroyed by the Wehrmacht. Furthermore the subsequent Battle of Kiev in September, where over 600,000 Soviet troops were captured or killed, lowered his standing with Stalin. Zhukov subsequently claimed that he was forced by Joseph Stalin to sign the directive, supposedly written by Aleksandr Vasilevsky, despite the reservations that he raised.

When Stalin arrived unannounced at command headquarters on 29 June, demanding to know why he was not being told what was happening at the front, Zhukov said: "Comrade Stalin, our duty is first of all to help the front commanders and only then to inform you." But when he had to admit that they lost contact with the front commanders in Belarus, Stalin lost his temper and called him "useless".

On 29 July, Zhukov was removed from his post of chief of the general staff. In his memoirs he gives his suggested abandoning of Kiev to avoid an encirclement as a reason for it. On the next day the decision was made official and he was appointed the commander of the Reserve Front. There he oversaw the Yelnya offensive, delivering the Red Army's first victory over the Germans. On 10 September, Zhukov was made the commander of the Leningrad Front. There he oversaw the defense of the city.

On 6 October, Zhukov was appointed the representative of Stavka for the Reserve and Western Fronts. On 10 October, those fronts were merged into the Western Front under Zhukov's command. This front then participated in the Battle of Moscow and several Battles of Rzhev.

In late August 1942, Zhukov was made deputy commander in chief, subordinate only to Stalin, and sent to the southwestern front to take charge of the defence of Stalingrad. He and Vasilevsky later planned the Stalingrad counteroffensive. In November, Zhukov was sent to coordinate the Western Front and the Kalinin Front during Operation Mars. In January 1943, he—together with Kliment Voroshilov—coordinated the actions of the Leningrad and Volkhov Fronts and the Baltic Fleet in Operation Iskra. On January 18, 1943, Zhukov was promoted to Marshal of the Soviet Union.

==== Battle of Kursk ====
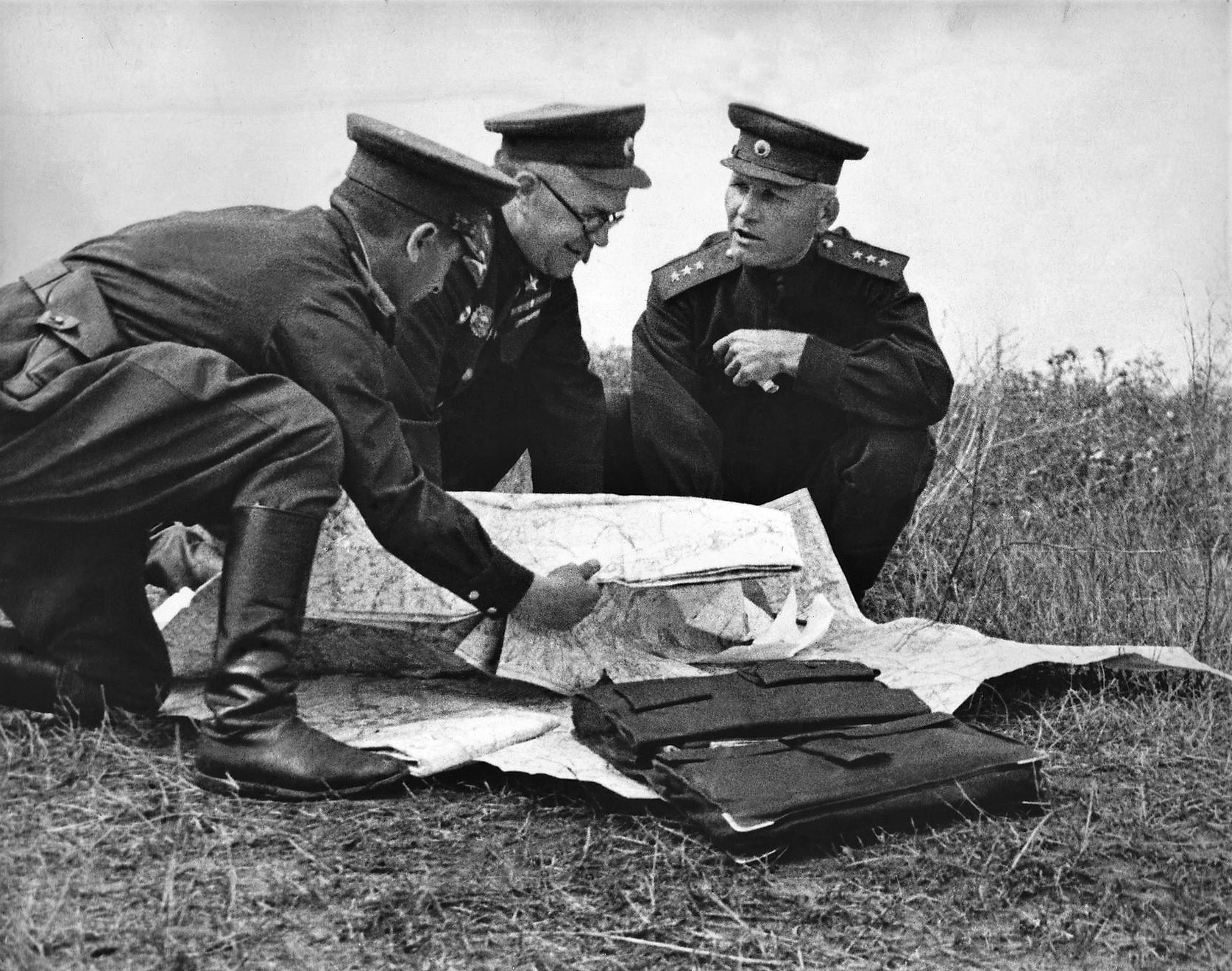
Zhukov and Ivan Konev during the Battle of Kursk, 1943

Zhukov was a Stavka coordinator at the battle of Kursk in July 1943. He was considered the main architect of the Soviet victory together with Vasilevsky. According to Zhukov's memoirs, he played a central role in the planning of the battle and the hugely successful offensive that followed. Commander of the Central Front Konstantin Rokossovsky, said, however, that the planning and decisions for the Battle of Kursk were made without Zhukov, that he only arrived just before the battle, made no decisions and left soon afterward, and that Zhukov exaggerated his role. A sense of the nature of the beginning of Rokossovsky's famous World War II rivalry with Zhukov can be gathered from reading Rokossovsky's comments in an official report on Zhukov's character:

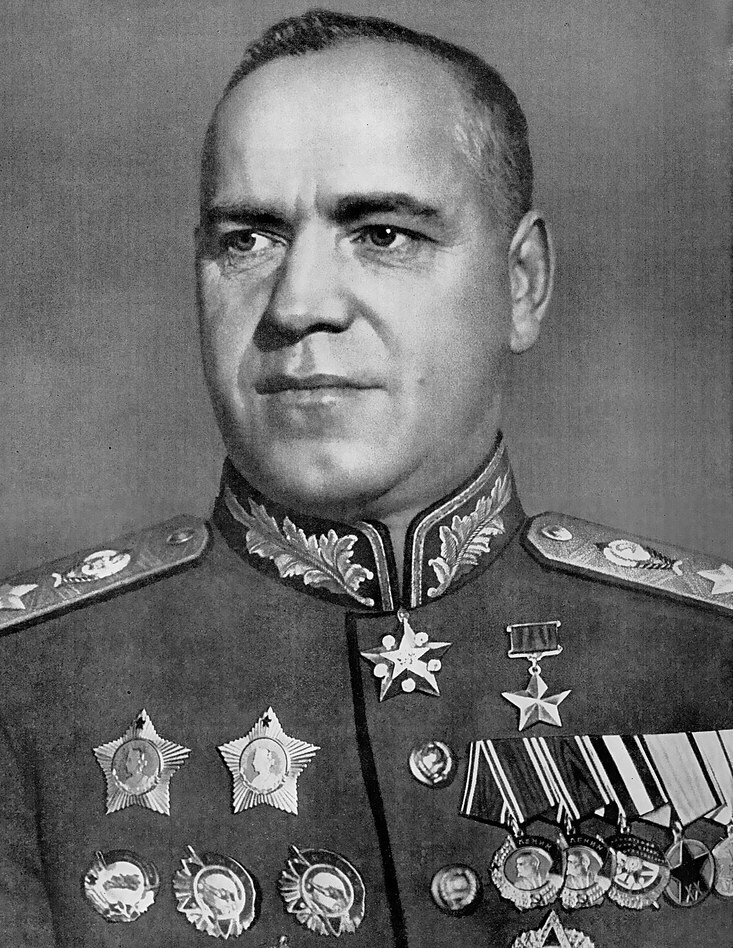
Georgy Zhukov in 1944.

Has a strong will. Decisive and firm. Often demonstrates initiative and skillfully applies it. Disciplined. Demanding and persistent in his demands. A somewhat ungracious and not sufficiently sympathetic person. Rather stubborn. Painfully proud. In professional terms well trained. Broadly experienced as a military leader... Absolutely cannot be used in staff or teaching jobs because constitutionally he hates them.

From 12 February 1944, Zhukov coordinated the actions of the 1st Ukrainian and 2nd Ukrainian Fronts. On 1 March, Zhukov was appointed the commander of the 1st Ukrainian Front until early May following the ambush of Nikolai Vatutin, its commander, by the anti-Soviet Ukrainian Insurgent Army near Ostroh. During the Soviet offensive named Operation Bagration, Zhukov coordinated the 1st Belorussian and 2nd Belorussian Fronts, and later the 1st Ukrainian Front as well. On 23 August, Zhukov was sent to the 3rd Ukrainian Front to prepare for the advance into Bulgaria.

=== Surrender of Germany ===
==== March on Berlin ====
On 16 November, he became commander of the 1st Belorussian Front which took part in the Vistula–Oder offensive and the Battle of Berlin. He called on his troops to "remember our brothers and sisters, our mothers and fathers, our wives and children tortured to death by Germans ... We shall exact a brutal revenge for everything". More than 20 million Soviet soldiers and civilians died as a result of the war. In a reprisal for atrocities committed by German soldiers against Soviet civilians in the eastward advance into Soviet territory during Operation Barbarossa, the westward march by Soviet forces was marked by brutality towards German civilians, which included looting, burning and systematic rapes.

Zhukov was chosen to personally accept the German Instrument of Surrender in Berlin.

== Post-war service ==
=== Soviet occupation zone ===
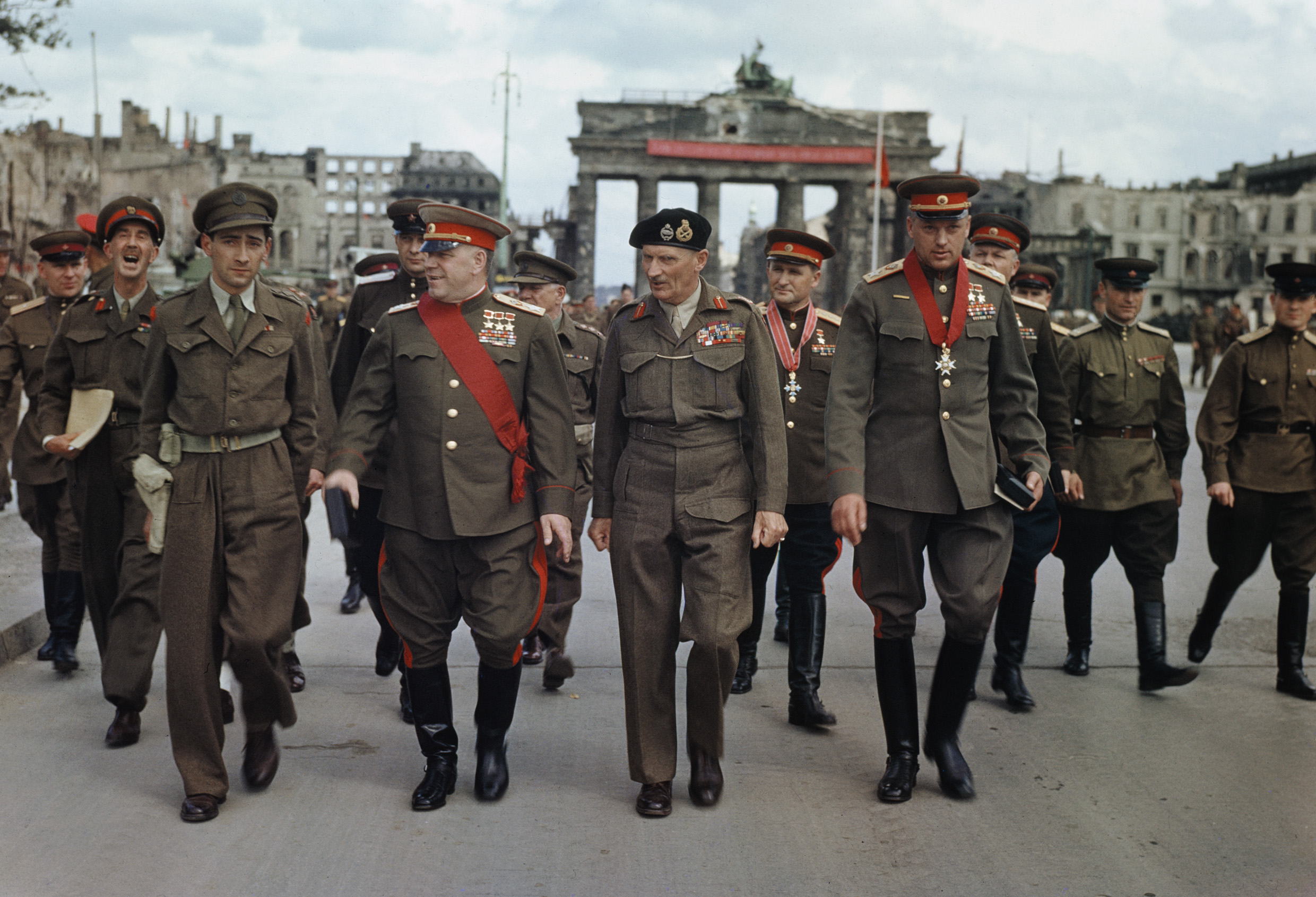
Front row, from right to left: Rokossovsky, Montgomery and Zhukov at the Brandenburg Gate

After the German capitulation, Zhukov became the first commander of the Soviet occupation zone in Germany. On 10 June 1945, he returned to Moscow to prepare for the 1945 Moscow Victory Parade. On 24 June, Stalin appointed him commander in chief of the parade. After the ceremony, on the night of 24 June, Zhukov went to Berlin to resume his command.

In May 1945, Zhukov signed three resolutions to improve living standards in the Soviet occupation zone:

- 11 May: resolution 063 – provision of food
- 12 May: resolution 064 – restoration of the public services sector
- 13 May: resolution 080 – provision of milk supplies for children

Zhukov requested the Soviet government to transport urgently to Berlin 96,000 tons of grain, 60,000 tons of potatoes, 50,000 cattle, and thousands of tons of other foodstuffs, such as sugar and animal fat. He issued strict orders that his subordinates were to "hate Nazism but respect the German people," and to make all possible efforts to restore and maintain a stable living standard for the German population.

=== Inter-allied diplomacy ===
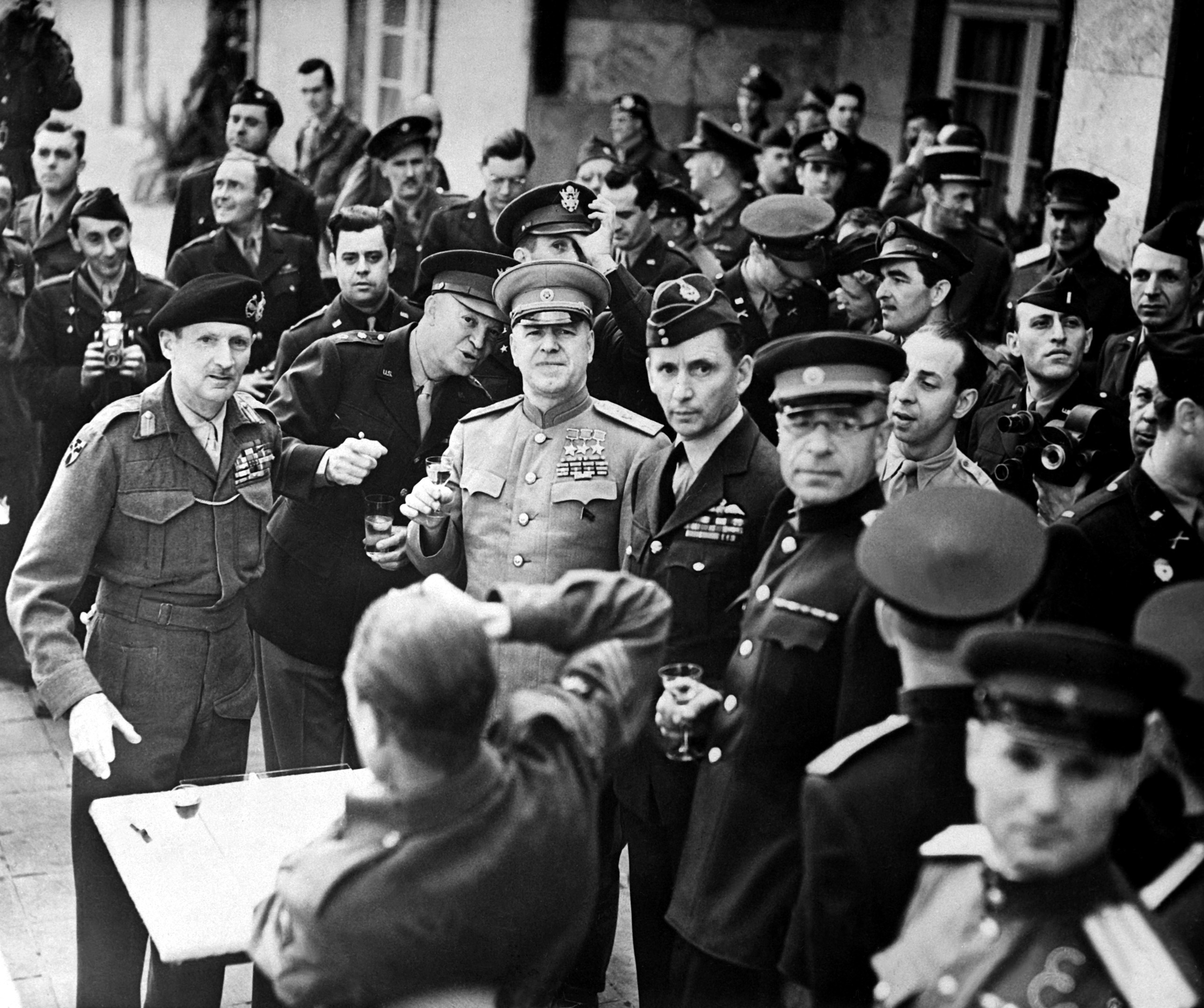
Zhukov sharing a toast with Eisenhower, Montgomery and other Allied officials, June 1945

From 16 July to 2 August, Zhukov participated in the Potsdam Conference with the fellow representatives of the Allied governments. As one of the four commanders of the Allied occupational forces, Zhukov established good relationships with his new colleagues, General Dwight D. Eisenhower, Field Marshal Bernard Montgomery, and Marshal Jean de Lattre, and the four frequently exchanged views about such matters as the sentencing, trials, and judgments of war criminals, geopolitical relationships between the Allied states, and how to defeat Japan and rebuild Germany.

Zhukov's good relationship with Eisenhower proved beneficial in resolving differences in post-war occupational issues. Eisenhower's successor, General Lucius D. Clay, also praised the Zhukov–Eisenhower friendship, and commented: "The Soviet–America relationship should have developed well if Eisenhower and Zhukov had continued to work together." Zhukov and Eisenhower went on to tour the Soviet Union together in the immediate aftermath of the victory over Germany. During this tour Eisenhower introduced Zhukov to Coca-Cola. As Coca-Cola was regarded in the Soviet Union as a symbol of American imperialism, Zhukov was apparently reluctant to be photographed or reported as consuming such a product. Zhukov asked if the beverage could be made colourless to resemble vodka. A European subsidiary of the Coca-Cola Export Corporation delivered an initial 50 cases of White Coke to Marshal Zhukov.

=== Decline of career ===
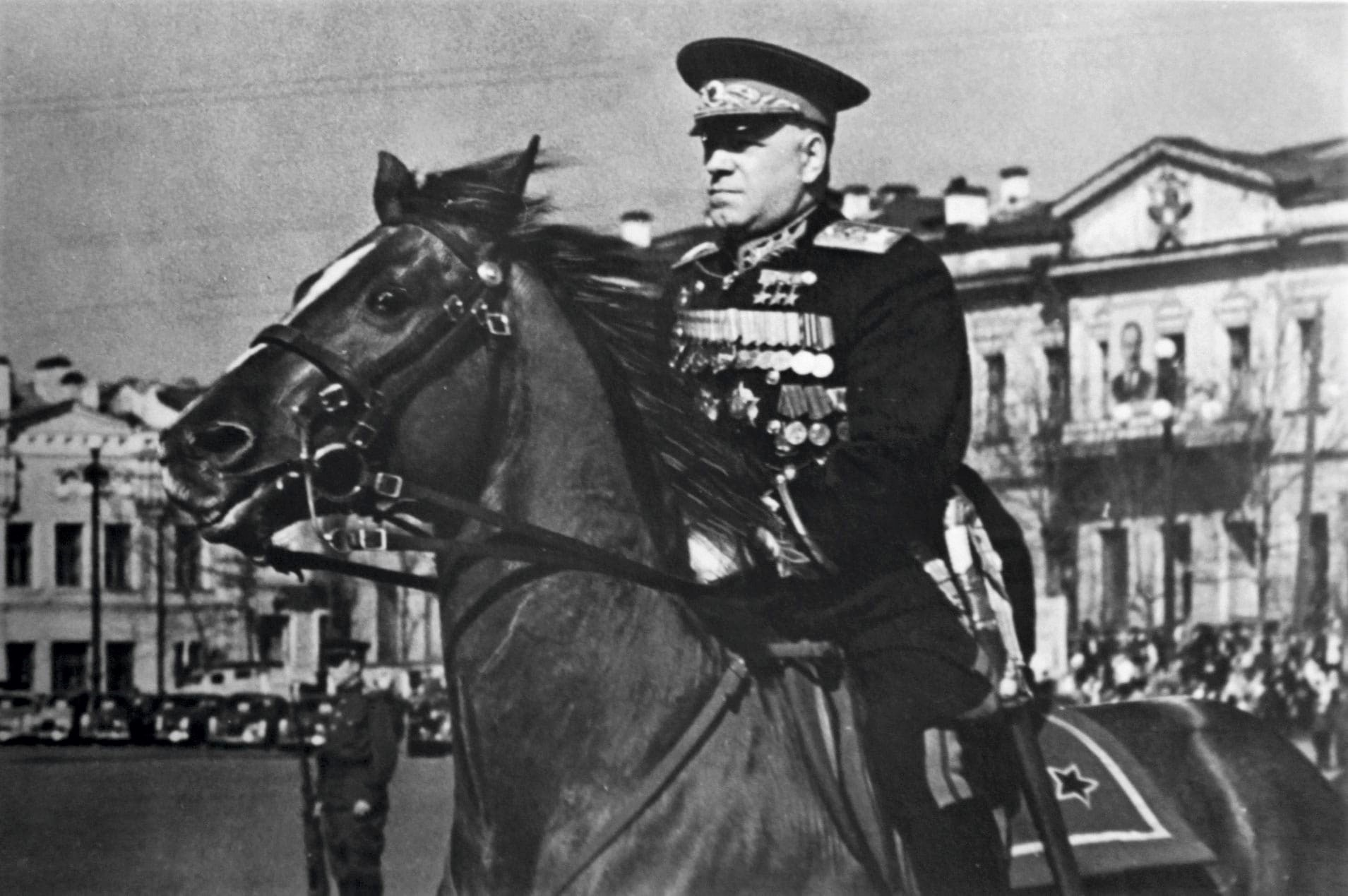
Zhukov at a post-war 1 May parade in Sverdlovsk, between 1948–1950

Zhukov was not only the supreme military commander of the Soviet occupation zone in Germany, but became its military governor on 10 June 1945. He was replaced with Vasily Sokolovsky on 10 April 1946. After an unpleasant session of the main military council—in which Zhukov was accused of egoism, disrespect to his peers, and of political unreliability and hostility to the Party Central Committee—he was stripped of his position as commander in chief of the Soviet Army.

He was assigned command of the Odessa Military District, far from Moscow and lacking in strategic significance and troops. He arrived there on 13 June 1946. Zhukov suffered a heart attack in January 1948, spending a month in the hospital. In February 1948, he was given another secondary posting, this time command of the Urals Military District. Peter G. Tsouras described the move from Odessa to the Urals as a relegation from a "second-rate" to a "fifth-rate" assignment.

Throughout this time, security chief Lavrentiy Beria was supposedly trying to topple Zhukov. Two of Zhukov's subordinates, Marshal of Aviation Alexander Novikov and Lieutenant-General Konstantin Telegin, were arrested and tortured in Lefortovo Prison at the end of 1945. After Stalin's death it was claimed that Novikov was allegedly forced by Beria into a "confession" which implicated Zhukov in a conspiracy. In reality, Novikov may have been encouraged to point the finger at Zhukov because he saw Zhukov's membership at the investigation commission of the Aviators Affair—a purge of the Soviet aircraft industry following accusations that, during the war, the fighter planes had been of poor quality—in which Novikov was implicated, as instrumental to his downfall. Regardless, in a conference, all generals except GRU director Filipp Golikov defended Zhukov against accusation of misspending. During this time, Zhukov was accused of unauthorized looting of goods confiscated by the Germans, and of Bonapartism.

In 1946, seven rail carriages with furniture that Zhukov was taking to the Soviet Union from Germany were impounded. In 1948, his apartments and house in Moscow were searched and many valuables looted from Germany were found. In his investigation Beria concluded that Zhukov had in his possession 17 golden rings, three gemstones, the faces of 15 golden necklaces, more than four kilometers (2.5 mi) of cloth, 323 pieces of fur, 44 carpets taken from German palaces, 55 paintings and 20 guns." Zhukov admitted in a memorandum to Zhdanov:

I felt very guilty. I shouldn't have collected those useless junks and put them into some warehouse, assuming nobody needs them any more. I swear as a Bolshevik that I would avoid such errors and follies thereafter. Surely I still and will wholeheartedly serve the Motherland, the Party, and the Great Comrade Stalin.

When learning of Zhukov's "misfortunes"—and despite not understanding all the problems—Eisenhower expressed his sympathy for his "comrade-in-arms." In February 1953, Stalin relieved Zhukov of his post as Commander of the Urals Military District, recalling Zhukov to Moscow. It was thought Zhukov's expertise was needed in the Korean War; however, in practice, Zhukov received no orders from Stalin after arriving in Moscow. On 5 March 1953, at 09:50, Stalin died of a stroke, and Zhukov's life entered a new phase.

=== Relationship with Stalin ===
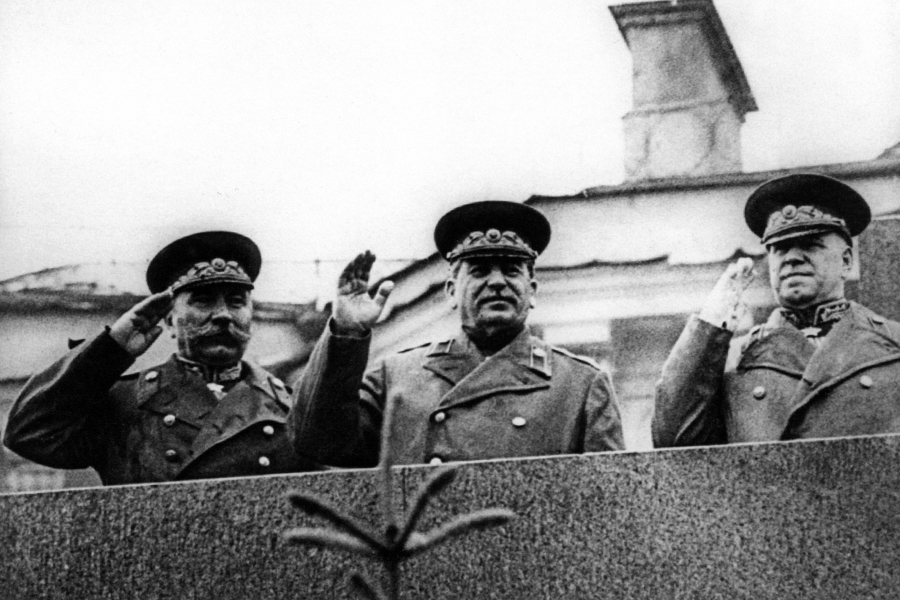
Zhukov (right) with Stalin and Semyon Budyonny during the Soviet Victory Parade of 1945

During the war, as the chief of staff and deputy supreme commander, Zhukov had hundreds of meetings with Stalin, both private and during Stavka conferences. Consequently, Zhukov understood Stalin's personality and methods well. According to Zhukov, Stalin was a bold and secretive person, but he was also hot-tempered and skeptical. Zhukov was able to gauge Stalin's mood: for example, when Stalin drew deeply on his tobacco pipe, it was a sign of a good mood. Conversely, if Stalin failed to light his pipe once it was out of tobacco, it was a sign of imminent rage. His outstanding knowledge of Stalin's personality was an asset that allowed him to deal with Stalin's outbursts in a way other Soviet generals could not.

Both Zhukov and Stalin were hot-tempered, and both made concessions necessary to sustain their relationship. While Zhukov viewed his relationship with Stalin as one of a subordinate–senior, Stalin was in awe and possibly envious of Zhukov. Both were military commanders, but Stalin's experience was limited to a previous generation of non-mechanized warfare. By contrast, Zhukov was highly influential in the development of contemporary combined operations of highly mechanized armies. The differences in their outlooks were the cause of many tempestuous disagreements between the two of them at Stavka meetings. Nonetheless, Zhukov was less competent than Stalin as a politician, highlighted by Zhukov's many failures in politics. Stalin's unwillingness to value Zhukov beyond the marshal's military talents was one of the reasons why Zhukov was recalled from Berlin.

Significant to their relationship as well was Zhukov's bluntness towards his superior. Stalin was dismissive of the fawning of many of his entourage and openly criticized it. Many people around Stalin—including Beria, Yezhov, and Mekhlis—felt obliged to flatter Stalin to remain on his good side. Zhukov remained obstinate and argumentative, and did not hesitate to publicly contradict Stalin to the point of risking his career and life. Their heated argument about whether to abandon Kiev due to the Germans' rapid advance in summer of 1941 was typical of Zhukov's approach. Zhukov's ability to remain skeptical and unwavering at giving in to pressure did garner him the respect of Stalin.

== Political career ==
=== Arresting Beria ===
After Stalin's death, Zhukov returned to favor, becoming Deputy Defence Minister in 1953. He then had an opportunity to avenge himself on Beria. With Stalin's sudden death, the Soviet Union fell into a leadership crisis. Georgy Malenkov temporarily became First Secretary. Malenkov and his allies attempted to purge Stalin's influence and personality cult; however, Malenkov himself did not have the courage to do this alone. Moreover, Lavrentiy Beria remained dangerous. The politicians sought reinforcement from the powerful and prestigious military men. In this matter, Nikita Khrushchev chose Zhukov because the two had forged a good relationship, and, in addition, during World War II, Zhukov had twice saved Khrushchev from false accusations.

On 26 June 1953, a special meeting of the Politburo was held by Malenkov. Beria came to the meeting with an uneasy feeling because it was called hastily—indeed, Zhukov had ordered General Kirill Moskalenko to secretly prepare a special force and permitted the force to use two of Zhukov's and Defence Minister Nikolai Bulganin's special cars (which had tinted windows) in order to safely infiltrate the Kremlin. Zhukov also ordered him to replace the MVD Guard with the guard of the Moscow Military District.

Finally, Khrushchev suggested expelling Beria from the Communist Party and bringing him before a military court. Moskalenko's special forces obeyed.

Zhukov was a member of the military tribunal during the Beria trial, which was headed by Marshal Ivan Konev. On 18 December 1953, the Military Court sentenced Beria to death. During the burial of Beria, Konev commented: "The day this man was born deserves to be damned!" Then Zhukov said: "I considered it as my duty to contribute my little part in this matter."

=== Minister of Defense ===
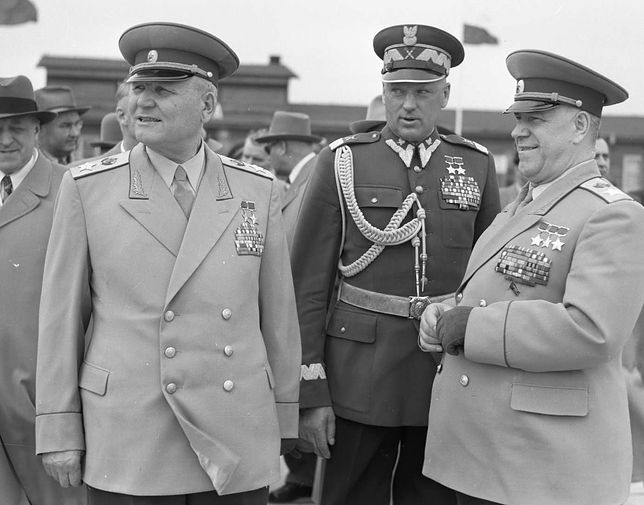
Zhukov (right) with Polish Minister of Defense Konstantin Rokossovsky (center) and Ivan Konev in Warsaw, 1955

When Bulganin became premier in 1955, he appointed Zhukov as Defense Minister. Zhukov participated in many political activities. He successfully opposed the re-establishment of the Commissar system, arguing that the Party and political leaders were not professional military men, and thus the highest power should fall to the army commanders. Until 1955, Zhukov had both sent to and received letters from Eisenhower. Both leaders agreed that the two superpowers should coexist peacefully. In July 1955, Zhukov—together with Khrushchev, Bulganin, Vyacheslav Molotov and Andrei Gromyko—participated in a Summit Conference at Geneva after the USSR signed the Austrian State Treaty and withdrew its army from the country.

Zhukov followed orders from the then prime minister Georgy Malenkov and Communist Party leader Khrushchev during the invasion of Hungary following the Hungarian Revolution of 1956. Along with the majority of members of the Presidium, he urged Khrushchev to send troops to support the Hungarian authorities and to secure the Austrian border. Zhukov and most of the Presidium were not, however, eager to see a full-scale intervention in Hungary. Zhukov even recommended the withdrawal of Soviet troops when it seemed that they might have to take extreme measures to suppress the revolution.

The mood in the Presidium changed again when Hungary's new prime minister, Imre Nagy, began to talk about Hungarian withdrawal from the Warsaw Pact. That led the Soviets to attack the revolutionaries and to replace Nagy with János Kádár. In the same years, when the UK, France, and Israel invaded Egypt during the Suez Crisis, Zhukov expressed support for Egypt's right of self-defense. In October 1957, Zhukov visited Yugoslavia and Albania aboard the Chapayev-class cruiser Kuibyshev, attempting to repair the Tito–Stalin split of 1948. During the voyage, Kuibyshev encountered units of the U.S. Sixth Fleet and "passing honours" in the form of full salvos were exchanged between the vessels.

=== Fall from power ===
On his 60th birthday, in 1956, Zhukov received his fourth Hero of the Soviet Union title—making him the first person to receive the honour four times. The only other four-time recipient was Leonid Brezhnev, who never rose above modest military rank and received all of his four Hero of the Soviet Union medals for his birthday as part of his overall cult of personality and love for medals, titles, and decorations. Despite his general lack of political ability, Zhukov became the highest-ranking military professional who was also a member of the Presidium of the Central Committee of the Communist Party. He further became a symbol of national strength, the most widely esteemed Soviet military hero of World War II. Zhukov's prestige was even higher than the police and security agencies of the USSR, and thus rekindled concerns among political leaders.

Going even further than Khrushchev, Zhukov demanded that the political agencies in the Red Army report to him before the Party. He demanded an official condemnation of Stalin's crimes during the Great Purge. He also supported the political vindication and rehabilitation of Mikhail Tukhachevsky, Grigoriy Shtern, Vasily Blyukher, Alexander Yegorov and many others. In response his opponents accused him of being a Reformist and Bonapartist. Such enviousness and hostility proved to be the key factor that led to his later downfall.

The relationship between Zhukov and Khrushchev reached its peak during the 20th Congress of the Communist Party of the Soviet Union (CPSU) in 1956. After becoming the First Secretary of the Party, Khrushchev moved against Stalin's legacy and criticised his personality cult in a speech, "On the Cult of Personality and Its Consequences". To complete such startling acts, Khrushchev needed the approval—or at least the acquiescence—of the military, headed by Minister of Defense Zhukov.

At the plenary session of the Central Committee of the CPSU held in June 1957 Zhukov supported Khrushchev against the "Anti-Party Group", that had a majority in the Presidium and voted to replace Khrushchev as First Secretary with Bulganin. At that plenum, Zhukov stated: "The Army is against this resolution and not even a tank will leave its position without my order!". In the same session the "Anti-Party Group" was condemned and Zhukov was made a member of the Presidium.

His second fall was more sudden and public even than his first. On 4 October 1957, he left on an official visit to Yugoslavia, and Albania. He returned to Moscow on 26 October, straight to a meeting of the Presidium, during which he was removed from that body. On 2 November, the Central Committee convened to hear Zhukov being accused of 'non-party behaviour', conducting an 'adventurist foreign policy', and sponsoring his own personality cult. He was expelled from the Central Committee and sent into forced retirement at age 61. The same issue of the Krasnaya Zvezda that announced Zhukov's return also reported that he had been relieved of his duties. According to many researchers, Soviet politicians—including Khrushchev himself—had a deep-seated fear of "powerful people".

== Later life ==
=== Retirement ===
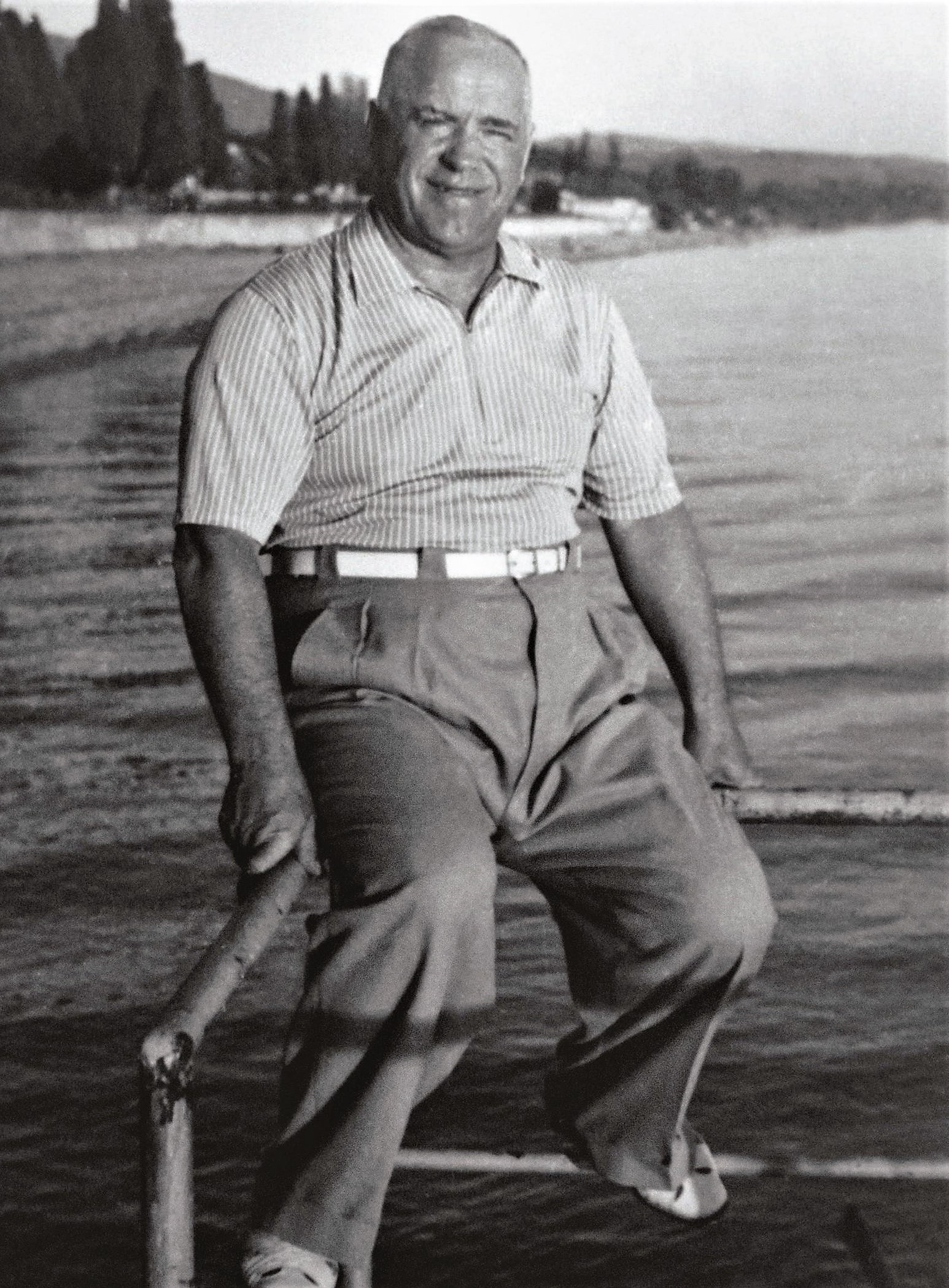
Zhukov on holiday in Sochi

After being forced out of the government, Zhukov stayed away from politics. Many people—including former subordinates—frequently paid him visits, joined him on hunting excursions, and exchanged reminiscences. In September 1959, while visiting the United States, Khrushchev told President Eisenhower that the retired Marshal Zhukov "liked fishing". Zhukov was actually a keen aquarist. In response, Eisenhower sent Zhukov a set of fishing tackle. Zhukov respected this gift so much that he is said to have exclusively used Eisenhower's fishing tackle for the remainder of his life, referring to Soviet fishing tackle as "substandard".

After Khrushchev was deposed in October 1964, Brezhnev restored Zhukov to favor—though not to power—in a move to use Zhukov's popularity to strengthen his political position. Zhukov's name was put in the public eye yet again when Brezhnev lionised Zhukov in a speech commemorating the Great Patriotic War. On 9 May 1965, Zhukov was invited to sit on the tribune of the Lenin Mausoleum and have the honour of reviewing the parade of military forces in Red Square.

Zhukov had begun writing his memoirs, Memories and Recollections, in 1958. He now worked intensively on them which, together with steadily deteriorating health, served to worsen his heart disease. It would take another decade until publication after Zhukov clashed constantly with Mikhail Suslov, the Communist Party's Chief Ideologue and Second in Command in charge of Censorship, who demanded many revisions and removals, particularly his criticisms of Stalin, Voroshilov, Budyonny and Molotov. After Brezhnev came to power, Suslov made further demands to exaggerate Colonel Brezhnev's role in WWII by glorifying the little known and strategically unimportant Battles of Malaya Zemlya and Novorossiysk as a decisive turning point in the Eastern Front, both of which Zhukov refused to do. In December 1967, Zhukov had a serious stroke. He was hospitalised until June 1968, and continued to receive medical and rehabilitative treatment at home under the care of his second wife, Galina Semyonova, a former officer in the Medical Corps. The stroke left him paralysed on his left side, his speech became slurred and he could only walk with assistance.

His memoirs were published in 1969 and became a best-seller. Within several months of the date of publication of his memoirs, Zhukov had received more than 10,000 letters from readers that offered comments, expressed gratitude, gave advice, or lavished praise. Supposedly, the Communist Party invited Zhukov to participate in the 24th Congress of the Communist Party of the Soviet Union in 1971, but the invitation was rescinded.

=== Death ===
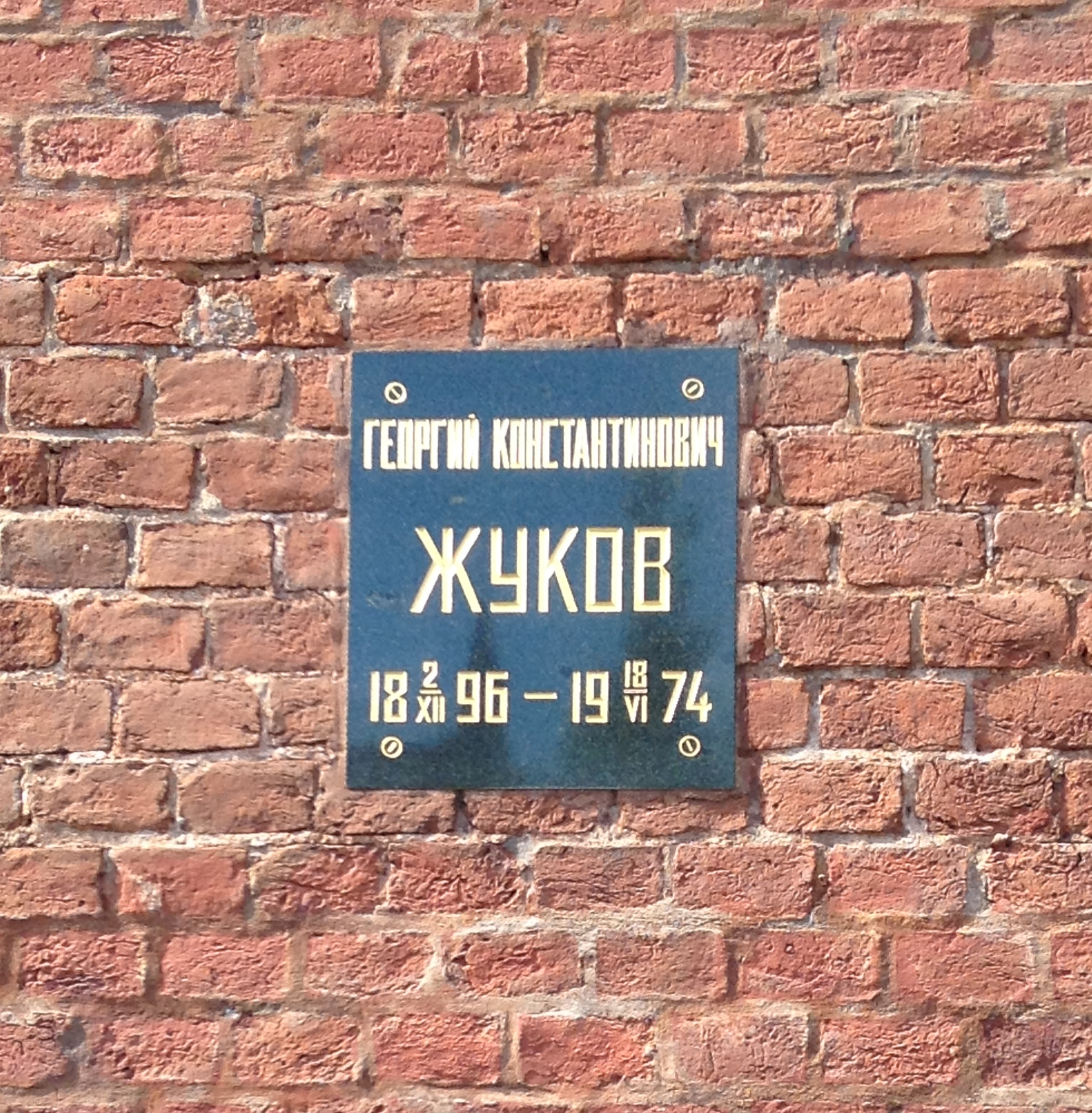
Zhukov's grave in the Kremlin Wall Necropolis

Zhukov died in Moscow, Russian SFSR on 18 June 1974 at age 77 after suffering a stroke. His body was cremated and his ashes were buried at the Kremlin Wall Necropolis alongside fellow generals and marshals of the Soviet Union during his funeral.

In 1995, an equestrian statue of Zhukov was erected in front of the State Historical Museum.

== Family ==
Father
Konstantin Artemyevich Zhukov (1851–1921); a shoemaker
Mother
Ustinina Artemievna Zhukova (1866–1944); farmer from a poor family
Siblings
1. Maria Konstantinovna Zhukova (1894–1954)
2. Alexei Konstantinovich Zhukov (born 1901); died prematurely
Spouses

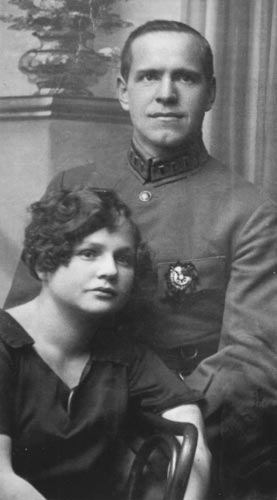
Zhukov and his wife Alexandra Dievna Zhukova

1. Alexandra Dievna Zuikova (1900–1967); common-law wife since 1920; married in 1953; divorced in 1965; died after a stroke
2. Galina Alexandrovna Semyonova (1926–1973); married in 1965; medical corps officer, at Burdenko hospital; specialized in therapeutics; died of breast cancer
Children
1. Era Zhukova (born 1928); by Alexandra Dievna Zukova
2. Margarita Zhukova (1929–2010); by Maria Nikolaevna Volokhova (1897–1983)
3. Ella Zhukova (1937–2010); by Alexandra Dievna Zukova
4. Maria Zhukova (born 1957); by Galina Alexandrovna Semyonova

== Legacy ==
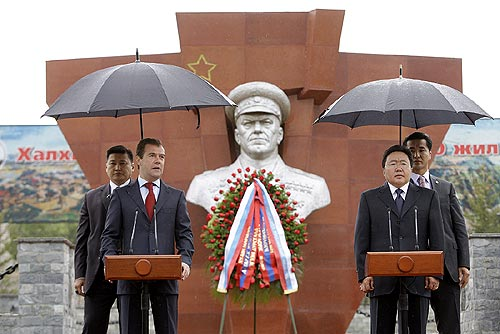
Russian president Dmitry Medvedev and Mongolian president Tsakhiagiin Elbegdorj visit the monument to Georgy Zhukov in Ulaanbaatar, near the Marshall Zhukov House Museum in Zhukov Street (Mongolian: Жуковын гудамж) in memory of the Battle of Khalkin Gol.

The first monument to Georgy Zhukov was erected in Mongolia, in memory of the Battle of Khalkin Gol. After the dissolution of the Soviet Union, this monument was one of the few that did not suffer from anti-Soviet backlash in former Communist states. There is a statue of Zhukov on horseback as he appeared at the 1945 victory parade on Manezhnaya Square at the entrance of the Kremlin in Moscow. Another statue of Zhukov in Moscow is located on Prospekt Marshala Zhukova. A statue of Zhukov is located in the town of Irbit, in the Sverdlovsk Oblast. Other statues of Zhukov are found in Omsk, Irkutsk and Yekaterinburg.

A minor planet, 2132 Zhukov, discovered in 1975, by Soviet astronomer Lyudmila Chernykh, is named in his honour. In 1996, Russia adopted the Order of Zhukov and the Zhukov Medal to commemorate the 100th anniversary of his birthday.

Nobel laureate Joseph Brodsky's poem On the Death of Zhukov ("Na smert' Zhukova", 1974) is regarded by critics as one of the best poems on the war written by an author of the post-war generation. The poem is a stylization of The Bullfinch, Derzhavin's elegy on the death of Generalissimo Suvorov in 1800. Brodsky draws a parallel between the careers of these two famous commanders. Aleksandr Solzhenitsyn re-interpreted Zhukov's memoirs in the short story Times of Crisis.

In his book of recollections, Zhukov was critical of the role the Soviet leadership played during the war. The first edition of Vospominaniya i razmyshleniya was published during Leonid Brezhnev's premiership only on the conditions that criticism of Stalin was removed, and that Zhukov add a (fictional) episode of a visit to Brezhnev, politruk on the Southern Front, to consult on military strategy.

In 1989, parts of previously unpublished and censored chapters from Zhukov's memoir were published by Pravda, which his daughter said had been hidden in a safe until they could be published. The excerpts included criticism of the 1937–1939 purges for annihilating "[M]any thousands of outstanding party workers" and stated that Stalin had played no role in directing the war effort, although he often issued orders devised by the general staff as if they were his own.

Appraisals of Zhukov's career vary. For example, historian Konstantin Zaleski claimed that Zhukov exaggerated his own role in World War II. Marshal Konstantin Rokossovsky said that the planning and decisions for the Battle of Kursk were made without Zhukov, that he only arrived just before the battle, made no decisions and left soon after.

Zhukov also received many positive comments, mostly from his Army companions, from the modern Russian Army, and from his Allied contemporaries. General of the Army Dwight D. Eisenhower stated that, because of Zhukov's achievements fighting the Nazis, the United Nations owed him much more than any other military leader in the world. "The war in Europe ended with victory and nobody could have done that better than Marshal Zhukov—we owed him that credit. He is a modest person, and so we can't undervalue his position in our mind. When we can come back to our Motherland, there must be another type of Order in Russia, an Order named after Zhukov, which is awarded to everybody who can learn the bravery, the far vision, and the decisiveness of this soldier."

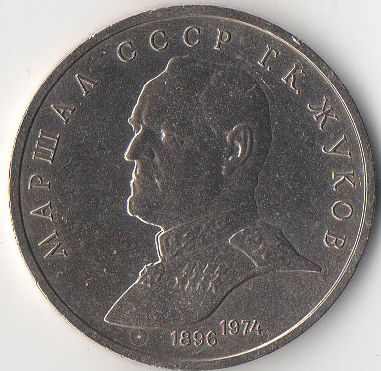
Zhukov depicted on a 1990 Soviet ruble commemorative coin

Marshal of the Soviet Union Aleksandr Vasilevsky commented that Zhukov is one of the most outstanding and brilliant military commanders of the Soviet military forces. Major General Sir Francis de Guingand, chief of staff of Field Marshal Bernard Montgomery, described Zhukov as a friendly person. John Gunther, who met Zhukov many times after the war, said that Zhukov was more friendly and honest than any of the other Soviet leaders.

John Eisenhower—son of Dwight Eisenhower—claimed that Zhukov was really ebullient and was a friend of his. Albert Axell in his work "Marshal Zhukov, the one who beat Hitler" claimed that Zhukov was a military genius like Alexander the Great and Napoleon. Axell also commented that Zhukov was a loyal communist and a patriot. At the end of his work about Zhukov, Otto Chaney concluded: "But Zhukov belongs to all of us. In the darkest period of World War II his fortitude and determination eventually triumphed. For Russians and people everywhere he remains an enduring symbol of victory on the battlefield."

In Russia, Zhukov is often credited with having said to Konstantin Rokossovsky in Berlin in 1945: "We have liberated them, and they will never forgive us for that."

== In popular culture ==
Zhukov has been portrayed by the following actors:

- Fedor Blazhevich in The Vow and The Fall of Berlin
- Mikhail Ulyanov in Stalingrad, Liberation, Battle of Moscow, and Take Aim
- Vladimir Menshov in The General and Liquidation
- Valeriy Grishko in White Tiger
- Aleksandr Baluev in Zhukov
- Jason Isaacs in The Death of Stalin

Star Trek: The Next Generation producers named an Ambassador-class starship after Zhukov, which was mentioned or made an appearance in several episodes of the series.

== Decorations ==
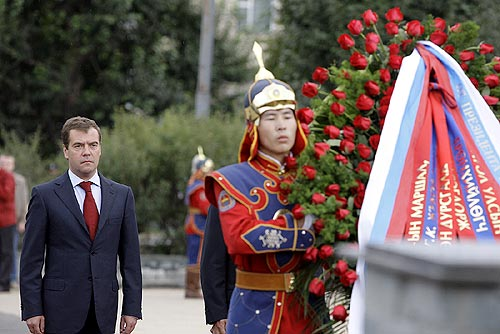
Russian president Dmitry Medvedev laying a wreath at a monument to Zhukov in Ulaanbaatar, while on a state visit to Mongolia in August 2009

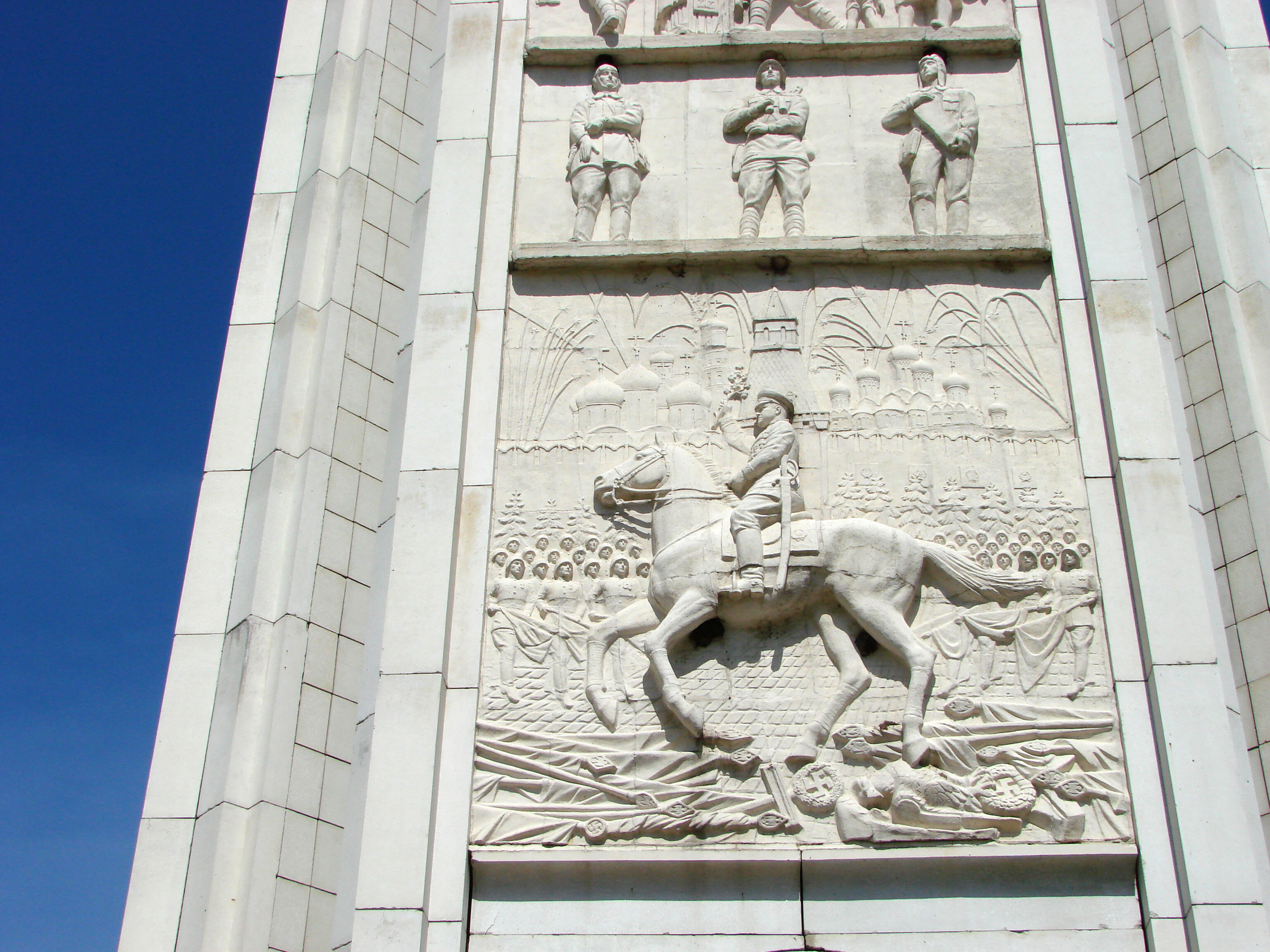
Marshal Zhukov depicted on façade of Victory Memorial, Prokhorovka, Russia

Zhukov was the recipient of many decorations. Most notably he was awarded the Hero of the Soviet Union four times. The medals of the only other four-time recipient, Leonid Brezhnev, were the result of self-awarding as birthday gifts.

Zhukov was one of only three recipients to receive the Order of Victory twice. He was also awarded high honours from many other countries. A partial listing is presented below.

=== Imperial Russia ===
Cross of St. George, 3rd class
Cross of St. George, 4th class

=== Soviet Union ===
Hero of the Soviet Union (29 August 1940, 29 July 1944, 1 June 1945, 1 December 1956)
Order of Victory (Serial No. 1, 10 April 1944 and Serial No. 5, 30 March 1945)
Order of Lenin (16 August 1936, 29 August 1939, 21 February 1945, 1 December 1956, 1 December 1966, 1 December 1971)
Order of the Red Star (1921)
Order of the October Revolution (22 February 1968)
Order of the Red Banner (31 August 1922, 3 November 1944, 20 June 1949)
Order of Suvorov, 1st class (Serial No. 1, 28 January 1943 and Serial No. 39, 28 July 1943)
Medal "For the Defence of Stalingrad"
Medal "For the Defence of Leningrad"
Medal "For the Defence of the Caucasus"
Medal "For the Defence of Moscow"
Medal "For the Liberation of Warsaw"
Medal "For the Capture of Berlin"
Medal "For the Victory over Germany in the Great Patriotic War 1941–1945"
Medal "For the Victory over Japan"
Jubilee Medal "Twenty Years of Victory in the Great Patriotic War 1941-1945"
Jubilee Medal "XX Years of the Workers' and Peasants' Red Army"
Jubilee Medal "30 Years of the Soviet Army and Navy"
Jubilee Medal "40 Years of the Armed Forces of the USSR"
Jubilee Medal "50 Years of the Armed Forces of the USSR"
Jubilee Medal "In Commemoration of the 100th Anniversary of the Birth of Vladimir Ilyich Lenin"
Medal "In Commemoration of the 250th Anniversary of Leningrad"
Medal "In Commemoration of the 800th Anniversary of Moscow"
Honorary weapon – sword inscribed with golden national emblem of the Soviet Union

=== Foreign ===
Hero of the Mongolian People's Republic (Mongolian People's Republic, 1969)
Order of Sukhbaatar (Mongolian People's Republic, 1968, 1969, 1971)
Order of the Red Banner (Mongolian People's Republic, 1939, 1942)
Medal "30 Years of the Victory in Khalkhin-Gol" (Mongolian People's Republic)
Medal "50 Years of the Mongolian People's Revolution" (Mongolian People's Republic)
Medal "For Victory over Japan" (Mongolian People's Republic)
Medal "50 Years of the Mongolian People's Army" (Mongolian People's Republic)
Order of the White Lion, 1st class (Czechoslovakia)
Military Order of the White Lion, 1st class (Czechoslovakia)
War Cross 1939–1945 (Czechoslovakia)
Virtuti Militari, 1st class (Poland)
Order of Polonia Restituta, 1st class (Poland)
Order of Polonia Restituta, 3rd class (Poland)
Cross of Grunwald, 1st class (Poland)
Medal "For Warsaw 1939–1945" (Poland)
Medal "For Oder, Neisse and the Baltic" (Poland)
Medal "25 Years of the Bulgarian People's Army" (Bulgaria)
Medal "90th Anniversary of the Birth of Georgi Dimitrov" (Bulgaria)
Garibaldi Partisan Star (Italy, 1956)
Grand Cross of the Order of Merit (Egypt, 1956)
Grand Officer of the Legion d'Honneur (France, 1945)
Croix de guerre (France, 1945)
Honorary Knight Grand Cross, Order of the Bath, (military division) (UK, 1945)
Chief Commander, Legion of Merit (United States, 1946)
Order of Freedom (Yugoslavia, 1956)
Medal of Sino-Soviet Friendship (China, 1953 and 1956)

== Notes ==
Military offices
Preceded by Kirill Meretskov	Chief of the Staff of the Red Army; 1941	Succeeded by Boris Shaposhnikov
Political offices
Preceded by Nikolai Bulganin	Minister of Defence of Soviet Union; 1955–1957	Succeeded by Rodion Malinovsky
