= Order of Chinggis Khaan =

Mongolian state decoration

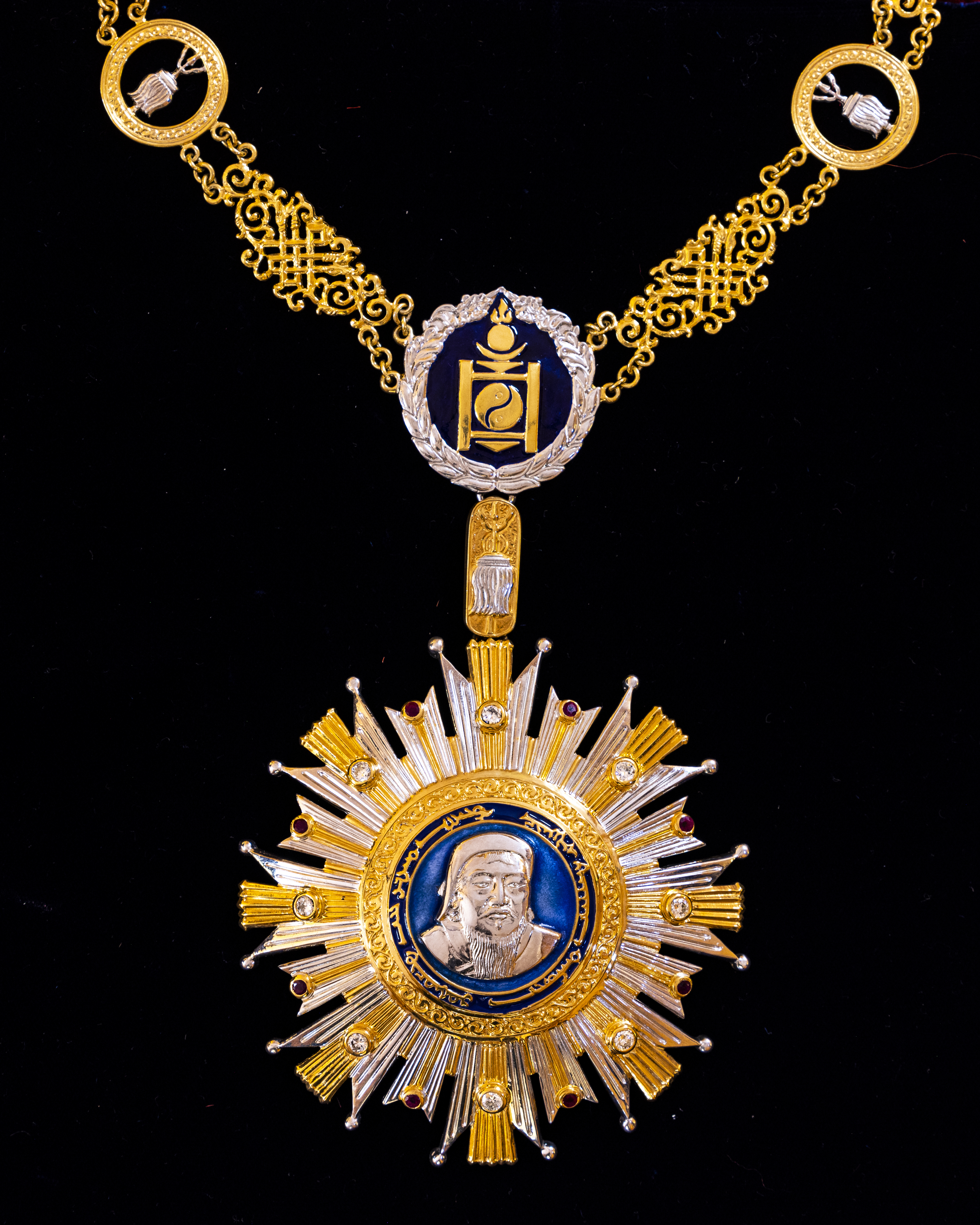
- Medal of the Order of Chinggis Khaan
- Native name: Чингис хаан одон
- Type: Award
- Awarded for: Special merits in society
- Presented by: Mongolia
- Eligibility: Mongolian and foreign citizens
- Established: 17 May 2002
- First award: 2005

Precedence
- Next (lower): Order of the Precious Wand

The Order of Chinggis Khaan (Mongolian: Чингис хаан одон, romanized: Chingis khaan odon) is the highest state decoration of Mongolia.

== The Supreme Decoration of the Mongolian State, the Order of Chinggis Khaan ==
In 2002, the State Great Khural backed the initiative of the second President of Mongolia, Natsagiin Bagabandi, and approved the Parliamentary Resolution No. 21 to award the Supreme Decoration of the Mongolian State, the Order of Chinggis Khaan. The first order was awarded to the first President of Mongolia in 2005, and 14 awards ceremonies have been held to date, 12 of which were conferred on individuals, one to “The Hu” band, and one to the General Staff of the Mongolian Armed Forces.

The Order of Chinggis Khaan is awarded to the distinguished citizens of Mongolia who made invaluable contributions to strengthening the independence and sovereignty of Mongolia and the unity of the people, ensuring social, economic, cultural, and scientific growth, promoting the historical and cultural heritage of Mongolia to the future generations and to the world, and performing great deeds for the state, community, and the nation along with a confirmation certificate.

== Criteria for awarding ==
1. To the distinguished citizens, bands, and organizations of Mongolia who made invaluable contributions to strengthening the independence and sovereignty of Mongolia and the unity of the people and promoting the historical and cultural heritages of Mongolia to the future generations and to the world, and performed great deeds for the state, community, and the nation.
2. State and social dignitaries and citizens of foreign countries for an exceptional contribution to the national unity, prosperity, strengthening the peace of humankind, development of relations and cooperation established by Mongolia with foreign countries, promotion of Mongolia’s reputation in the world, and specific involvement to the economic, social and intellectual development of the country.

== Number of the order conferred in a year ==
Although there is a limit of awarding one individual or organization with the Order of Chinggis Khaan in a year, it was decided to award two individuals in 2021.

== Incentives that accompany the award ==
- The recipient of Mongolian nationality will be given a cash prize equivalent to 35 grams of gold at the current exchange rate and the same amount of cash prize equivalent to 35 grams of gold at the current exchange rate or an equivalent commemorative item to a foreign national.
- A citizen of Mongolia who has been awarded the Order of Chinggis Khaan will be invited to the state ceremonies including the award ceremony of the Order of Chinggis Khaan, the National Naadam Festival, Constitution Day, and the Lunar New Year.
- A citizen of Mongolia awarded with the Order of Chinggis Khaan will be given a gift from the President of Mongolia on the birth anniversary of Chinggis Khaan which falls on the first day of the initial winter month by the Lunar calendar.
- According to the procedure for nomination and awarding of the Order of Chinggis Khaan, a citizen of Mongolia who has been awarded the Order of Chinggis Khaan has the right to be a part of the delegation of the President of Mongolia’s official visits to foreign countries.

== Glorifying the Laureates ==
- The portrait of the laureate will be respectfully placed in the Ceremonial Hall of the State Palace.
- 30-50 minute content or TV program showcasing the life and work of the laureate and the awards ceremony will be created and broadcast on at least three different television stations at least three times. One-page newspaper report, essay, and article will be published on at least three daily newspapers distributed throughout the country.
- As stipulated in the article 5.4, the one-page newspaper report, essay, and article will be kept in the archive of the Office of the President.
- Upon the request of the laureates or their heirs, the award and the confirmation certificate could be respectfully placed in the National Museum of Mongolia to perpetuate the honor of the laureate.

== List of recipients ==
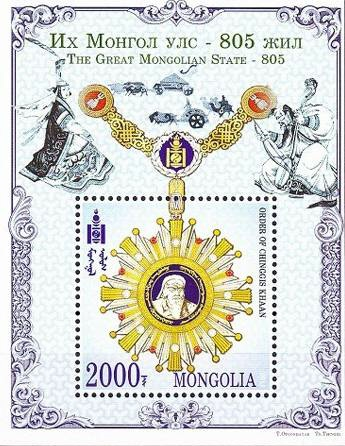
The award on a Mongolian stamp

1. Punsalmaagiin Ochirbat (2005)
2. Byambasuren Sharav (2006)
3. Dashiin Byambasüren (2009)
4. Radnaasümbereliin Gonchigdorj (2010)
5. Natsagiin Bagabandi (2011)
6. Damdiny Demberel (2012)
7. Dumaagiin Sodnom (2013)
8. Khavtgain Namsrai (2014)
9. Gombojavyn Mend-Ooyo (2015)
10. Ganbaataryn Ariunbaatar (2016)
11. Naidangiin Tüvshinbayar (2017)
12. The Hu (2019)
13. Jügderdemidiin Gürragchaa (2021)
14. Mongolian Armed Forces (2021)
15. D. Dorjgotov (2022)
16. Jack Weatherford (2022)
17. Morin Khuur Ensemble (2023)

== See also ==
- Orders, decorations, and medals of Mongolia
