= Order of the Precious Wand =

State decoration of Mongolia

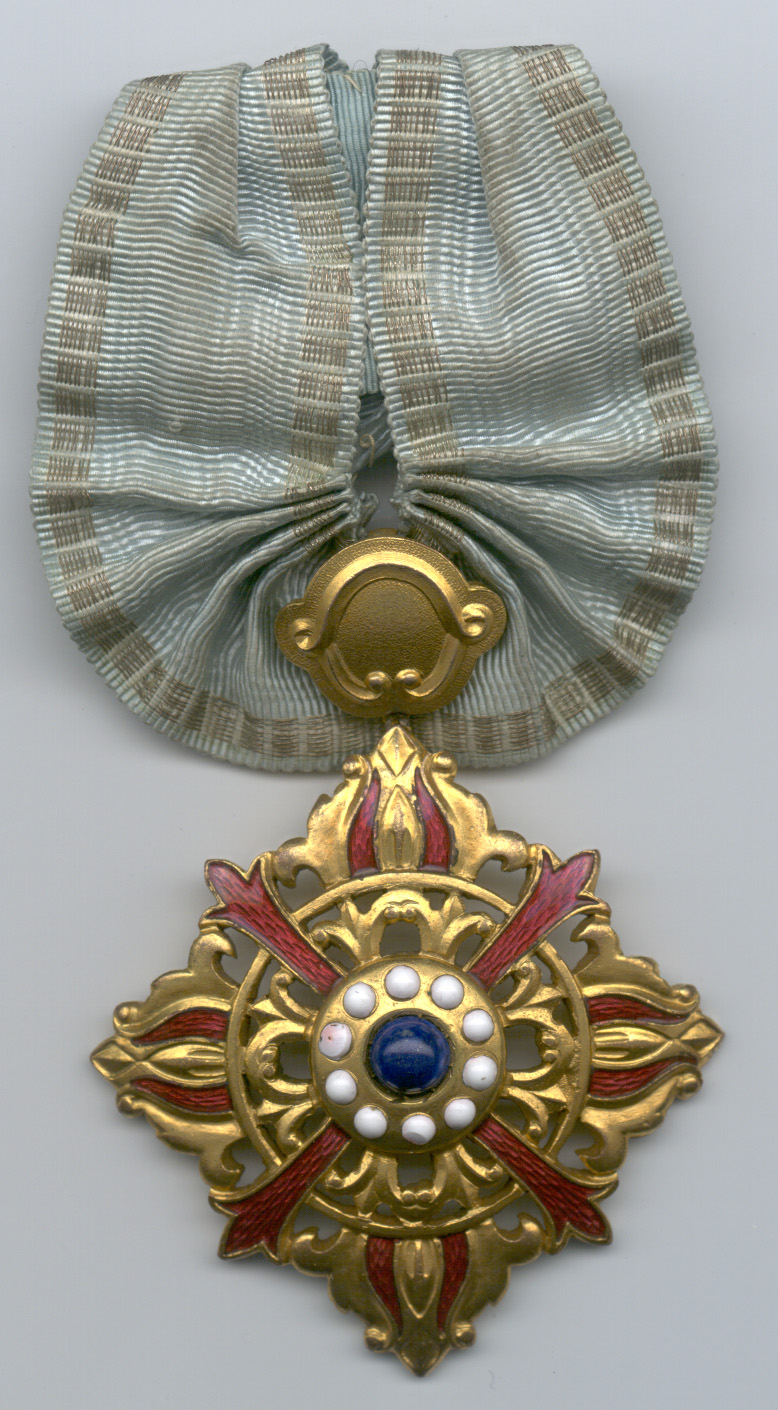
- Type: Award
- Awarded for: Contributions to strengthening the principles of democracy and cooperation with Mongolia
- Country: Mongolia
- Established: 1913 (re-established 1991)
- Ribbon of the order

Precedence
- Next (higher): Order of Chinggis Khaan

The Order of the Precious Wand (Mongolian: Эрдэнийн Очир одон, ᠡᠷᠳᠡᠨᠢ ᠶᠢᠨ ᠸᠴᠢᠷ ᠣᠳᠤᠨ), also known as the Order of the Vajra or the Order of the Precious Rod, is a state decoration of Mongolia originally instituted in 1913 and re-instituted in 1991. It is awarded to foreign statesmen and individuals who have made a great contribution to strengthening the principles of democracy and cooperation with Mongolia. It was the highest state award of Mongolia between the years 1913–1921 and 1991–2002.

== History ==
The Minister of Foreign Affairs of Mongolia Mijiddorjiin Khanddorj made a visit to St. Petersburg in 1912, immediately after the Mongolian Revolution of 1911, where during the visit he was awarded the Imperial Order of Saint Anne 1st class, as well as the Order of Saint Stanislaus 1st and 2nd classes. After the visit, Khanddorj proposed to the Bogd Khan to create a similar order based on the Russian one. The first awards were ordered by the Prime Minister Tögs-Ochiryn Namnansüren in St. Petersburg and were made in 1913. Initially, the order had three degrees, which were further divided into twelve classes. The first degree (тэргүүн зэрэг) included the Order of Genghis Khan, which was intended to award the heads (monarchs and heirs to the throne) of foreign states, the Order of Abtai Sain Khanfor awarding foreign princes, and Undur Gegen. The second and third degree orders were awarded to both Mongolian and foreign government officials and private individuals.

After the Mongolian Revolution of 1921 overthrowing the Bogd Khanate of Mongolia, the order was presented to the head of the Soviet mission in the capital, A. Ya. Okhtin, the chief of staff of the Mongolian People's Army Vladimir Antonovich Khuva, and to the Soviet military leaders Konstantin Neumann and Dmitry Iosifovich Kosich. However, this order was soon abolished as it was deemed being "feudal".

The Order was re-established in 1991 with three degrees without classes. It is awarded to foreign statesmen and individuals who have made a great contribution to strengthening the principles of democracy and cooperation with Mongolia.

With the establishment of the Order of Chinggis Khaan in 2002, the Order of the Precious Staff lost its status as the highest state award.

== See also ==
- Orders, decorations, and medals of Mongolia
