= Orders, decorations, and medals of Mongolia =

List of Mongolian honours

Orders, decorations, and medals of Mongolia are governed by the laws of Mongolia on awards.

== History ==
=== Early awards ===
Titles in Mongolia have a history dating back to the time of the Mongol Empire. For example, the title of Baatar (“Hero”) was traditionally awarded to military leaders. At the beginning of the 20th century, Russia played a key role in establishing Mongolia's independence from China. To honor this contribution, the Order of the Vajra (translated as the “Order of the Precious Rod/Precious Wand”) was created for Mongolian nobility and foreigners, the latter were almost exclusively Russians. The order, divided into two degrees with four and five ranks correspondigly, was abolished after the Mongolian Revolution of 1921.

=== Communist era ===
Later on during the Cold War, state awards returned to the mainstream, with Mongolian designs being patterned off of the Soviet model. Many of the higher Mongolian awards were also manufactured in the Soviet Union. In 1936, the new Mongolian state had formally enshrined the title of “Hero” by law, and in 1941, the “Badge of the Hero” was established. In 1956 the Hero of Labor Golden Soyombo Medal was added to the Mongolian awards system. A unique title, known as "Honorary Freeman of the Mongolian People’s Republic" was for Soviet leader Leonid Brezhnev to commemorate his visit to Ulaanbaatar in 1974.

=== Post-communism ===
Unlike the situation after the fall of the Soviet Union, the communist-era awards of the Mongolian People's Republic were not abolished after the Mongolian Revolution of 1990, with many being awarded to this day. Besides this, the Order of the Vajra (Precious Rod) was re-established in 1991, and in 2005 the first Order of Genghis Khan was awarded.

Since there is lack of a single law regulating state awards and decorations – currently the process is based on various pieces of legislation, including a 1990 decree by the People's Great Khural, a 1999 Decree No. 71 of the President of Mongolia and others – there have been many calls and initiatives to reform the award system since then. In 2009, the Office of the President of Mongolia started a phased development of a draft law in 2009. By September/December 2015, the draft Law on State Awards was published on the office's website, after the initial version, published in April 2014, was amended after consultations. A contest to select new designs for the highest state orders and medals was held and results were announced on 9 October 2014.

Some of the published designs include an updated Hero of Mongolia badge with a Mongolian flag-styled ribbon; a new badge of the State Treasure title featuring the Mahayana Buddhist Three Jewels; a slightly changed version of the Order of Genghis Khan; de-communized and updated designs for the Order of the Polar Star, the Order of Mother Heroine, the Honored Worker of Mongolia title and the State Cultural Prize badge, featuring the current Emblem of Mongolia; a new Honorary Medal of Labor, Honorary Medal of Combat, Just Actions Medal (Fair Procedure Medal) Friendship Medal design.

==== Proposed table of awards ====
Highest awards:

- Hero of Mongolia title (Монгол Улсын баатар цол)
- State ("National") Treasure title (Улсын эрдэнэ цол)
- Order of Genghis Khan

High awards:

- Honored Worker of Mongolia title (Монгол Улсын гавьяат зүтгэлтэн цол)
- Order of the Precious Wand

Other awards:

- Order of the Polar Star
- Order of Military Merit (Цэргийн гавьяа одон)
- Order of Mother Heroine, 1st and 2nd Class (Эхийн алдар I, II одон)

Medals:

- Honorary Medal of Combat (Цэргийн хүндэт медаль)
- Honorary Medal of Labor (Хөдөлмөрийн хүндэт медаль)
- Just Actions Medal (Fair Procedure Medal, Шударга журам медаль)
- Friendship Medal (Найрамдал медаль)
- Medal of Peace (Энхийн төлөө медаль).

In January 2016, President Tsakhiagiin Elbegdorj presented the draft bill in a press conference. It was announced that the draft law would go in effect on 1 October 2016, however, it is unclear, if the law was implemented, since some of the original awards of the People's Republic period are still presented (as of 2024).

== Mongolia (since 1990) ==
=== Titles ===
- Hero of Mongolia
- Hero of Labour of Mongolia

=== Orders ===
- Order of Genghis Khan
- Order of Sukhbaatar
- Order of Mother Heroine, 1st Class
- Order of Mother Heroine, 2nd Class
- Order of the Polar Star
- Order of the Precious Wand
- Order of the Red Banner (for Military Merit)

=== Honorary Titles ===
- People's Artist of Mongolia
- People's Writer of Mongolia
- Meritorious Artist of Mongolia
- Cultural Leading Worker
- Honorary Medal of Combat
- Honored Service Officer

== Mongolian People's Republic (1923-1990) ==
=== Titles ===
- Hero of the Mongolian People's Republic
- Hero of Labour of the Mongolian People's Republic

=== Order ===
- Order of Military Merit
- Order of the Red Banner (for Military Merit)
- Order of the Red Banner of Labour

=== Honorary Titles ===
- Honorary Freeman of the Mongolian People's Republic (a one-time title created for Leonid Brezhnev during his visit to Mongolia in 1974)
- People's Artist
- People's Writer

=== Prizes ===
- Natsagdorj Literary Prize
- Choibalsan Prize (established in 1945 and renamed as the State Prize in 1962)

== Jubilee medals ==
- Medal "30 years of the Victory in Khalkhin-Gol"
- Medal "40 years of the Victory in Khalkhin-Gol"
- Medal "50 Years of the Mongolian People's Revolution"
- Medal "For the Victory over Japan"
- Medal "30th anniversary of the Victory over Japan"
- Medal "25th Anniversary of Mongolian People's Revolution"
- Medal "50 years of the Mongolian People's Republic"
- Medal "50 years of the Mongolian People's Army"

== See also ==
- Orders, decorations, and medals of Russia
