= Medal "30 years of the Victory in Khalkhin-Gol" =

Awarded by People's Republic of Mongolia
- Type: Medal
- Eligibility: Mongolian citizens and foreign nationals
- Awarded for: military and civil services
- Status: Obsolete
- People's Republic of Mongolia

The Medal "30 years of the Victory in Khalkhin-Gol" (Mongolian: Халхын голын ялалтын 30 жилийн ойн медаль) was an award of the Mongolian People's Republic, instituted on 9 June 1969.
It was awarded to Mongolians and foreigners for military and civil services. The Medal was created in 1969, in honor of the 30th anniversary of the Battle of Khalkhin-Gol.

== See also ==
- Orders, decorations, and medals of Mongolia
- Hero of the Mongolian People's Republic
- Order of Sukhbaatar
- Medal "50 Years of the Mongolian People's Revolution"
