= Medal "For the Victory over Japan" (Mongolia) =

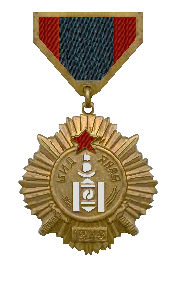
- Country: Mongolian People's Republic
- Established: 20 November 1945

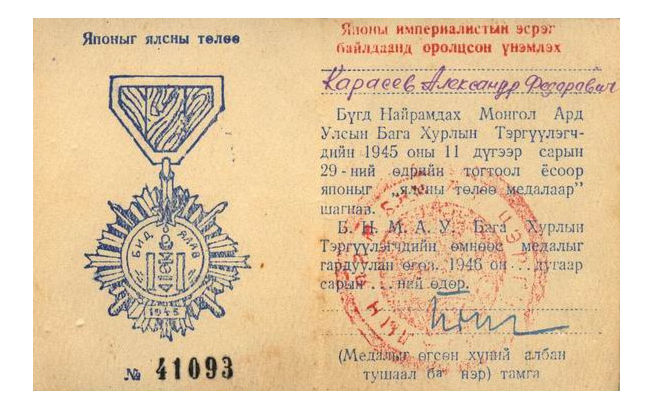
Medal certificate

The Medal "For the Victory over Japan" (Mongolian: Япон дээгүүр ялалт нь медаль) was a medal of the Mongolian People's Republic was established by the decree of the Presidium of the Little Khural on November 20, 1945 to commemorate the victory in the Soviet–Japanese Conflict of the Second World War.

== Recipients ==
=== Mongolian ===
- Khorloogiin Choibalsan
- Yumjaagiin Tsedenbal

=== Soviet ===
- Joseph Stalin
- Kliment Voroshilov
- Mikhail Belov
- Kirill Meretskov
- Leon Orbeli
- Georgy Zhukov
- Aleksandr Vasilevsky
- Nikolai Dedaev

== See also ==
- Orders, decorations, and medals of Mongolia

== Literature ==
- Herfurth D. Sowjetische Auszeichnungen 1918—1991. Auszeichnungen der Mongolische Volksrepublik. 1924—1992. Ein Katalog. Germany. 1999.
- Викторов-Орлов И. В. Награды Монгольской Народной Республики. Определитель. Горький: РИО Горьковского областного клуба экслибрисистов, 1990.
- Шейн Р., Содномдаржа Ц. Государственные награды Монгольской Народной Республики. 1921—1983 гг. Справочник. Улан-Батор: Госиздат МНР, 1984.
