= Medal "50 Years of the Mongolian People's Revolution" =

State award of Mongolia

- Type: Award
- Presented by: Mongolian People's Republic
- Eligibility: Mongolian and foreign citizens
- First award: June 9, 1970

The Medal "50 Years of the Mongolian People's Revolution" (Mongolian: Монгол ардын хувьсгалын 50 жилийн ойн медаль) was a state award of the Mongolian People's Republic.

== See also ==
- Orders, decorations, and medals of Mongolia
- Hero of the Mongolian People's Republic
- Order of Sukhbaatar
