= Stavka of the Supreme High Command =

- Ставка Верховного главнокомандования
- Emblem of the Workers' and Peasants' Red Army
- Active: June 23, 1941 – August 3, 1945
- Country: Soviet Union
- Branch: Armed Forces of the Soviet Union
- Engagements: Great Patriotic War

The Stavka of the Supreme High Command was an extraordinary body of the highest military command, exercising strategic leadership of the Soviet Armed Forces during the Great Patriotic War.

== History ==
On June 23, 1941, the Main Military Council of the Red Army was abolished. On the same day, by the resolution of the Council of People's Commissars of the Soviet Union and the Central Committee of the All–Union Communist Party (Bolsheviks) No. 825, the Headquarters of the Main Command of the Armed Forces of the Soviet Union was established. It included: Semyon Timoshenko (Chairman), Georgy Zhukov, Joseph Stalin, Vyacheslav Molotov, Kliment Voroshilov, Semyon Budyonny, Nikolai Kuznetsov. (Note: The first meetings of the Headquarters of the High Command of the Armed Forces in June were held without Stalin. The chairmanship of the People's Commissar of Defense of the Soviet Union, Marshal Semyon Timoshenko, was only nominal. As a member of the General Headquarters, I had to attend only one of these meetings, but it was not difficult to notice that the People's Commissar of Defense was not prepared for the position he held. And the members of the Headquarters too. The functions of each were not clear – there was no provision on the Headquarters. The people who were part of it were not at all going to obey the People's Commissar of Defense. They demanded from him reports, information, even a report on his actions. Semyon Timoshenko and Georgy Zhukov reported on the situation on the land fronts...)

On July 10, 1941, by a decree of the State Defense Committee, in connection with the formation of the High Commands of the Troops of the Directions (North–West, West and South–West), it was transformed into the Stavka of the High Command, Joseph Stalin became the chairman, and Boris Shaposhnikov was introduced to it.

On July 10, 1941, it was renamed into the Stavka of the Supreme High Command.

On February 17, 1945, by a resolution of the State Defense Committee, the following composition of the Stavka of the Supreme High Command was determined: Joseph Stalin (Supreme Commander–in–Chief), Georgy Zhukov (Deputy People's Commissar of Defense of the Soviet Union), Alexander Vasilevsky (Deputy People's Commissar of Defense), Alexey Antonov, Nikolai Bulganin, Nikolai Kuznetsov.

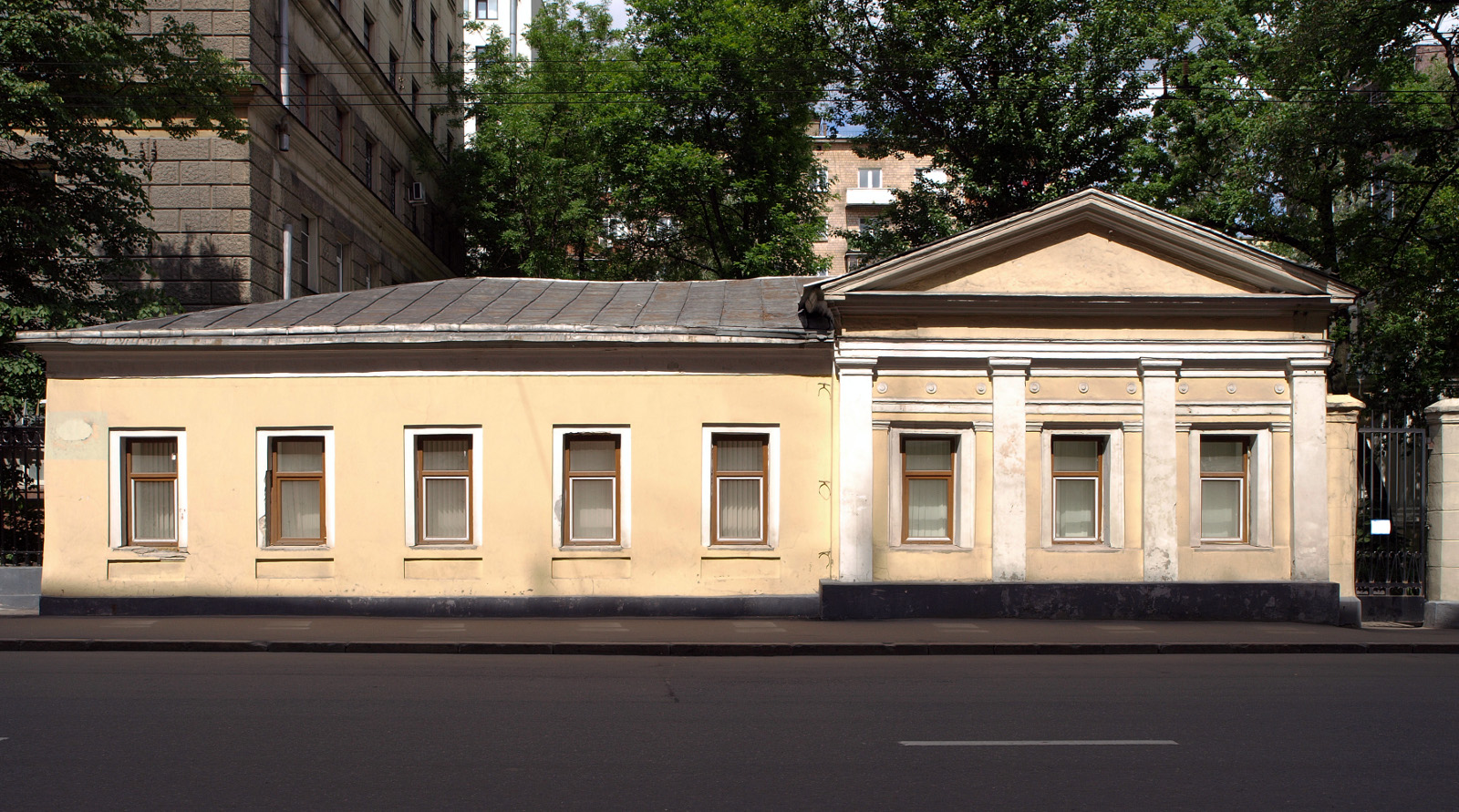
The city estate of Dokuchaev-Soldatyonkov where the Stavka met at certain period

The Stavka of the Supreme High Command carried out its activities under the leadership of the State Defense Committee.

Throughout the entire war, the Stavka of the Supreme High Command did not leave Moscow. The members of the Headquarters gathered in Stalin's Kremlin office, but with the start of the bombing of Moscow, it moved from the Kremlin to a small mansion at Kirov Street, 37, with reliable offices and communications. During the bombing, the work moved to the Kirovskaya Metro Station, where an underground strategic center for the management of the Armed Forces was prepared.

In October 1945, the Headquarters of the Supreme Command was abolished.

== Composition ==
	June 23 – July 10, 1941	July 10, 1941 – February 17, 1945	February 17 – August 3, 1945
Chairman	Semyon Timoshenko	Joseph Stalin	Joseph Stalin
Composition	Joseph Stalin	Semyon Timoshenko	Alexey Antonov
	Georgy Zhukov	Georgy Zhukov	Georgy Zhukov
	Semyon Budyonny	Semyon Budyonny	Alexander Vasilevsky
	Kliment Voroshilov	Kliment Voroshilov	Nikolay Bulganin
	Nikolay Kuznetsov	Boris Shaposhnikov	Nikolay Kuznetsov
	Vyacheslav Molotov	Vyacheslav Molotov	

== Formations ==
- Central Headquarters of the Partisan Movement at the Headquarters of the Supreme High Command;
- Rocket Artillery Formations, from September 8, 1941, to April 24, 1943;
- Long–Range Aviation of the Soviet Union;
- Guards Armies.

== Famous Orders of the Headquarters of the Supreme High Command ==
- Order of the Headquarters of the Supreme High Command No. 270 of August 16, 1941 "On the Responsibility of Servicemen for Surrendering and Leaving Weapons to the Enemy";
- Order of the Headquarters of the Supreme High Command No. 428 of November 17, 1941 "Destroy and Burn to the Ground All the Settlements in the Rear of the German Troops".

== Addresses ==
- Stalin's office in the Kremlin;
- First days of the war and until the end of 1941 – Kirov Street, 37 (the former estate of Dokuchaev–Soldatenkov, later there was the reception of the Minister of Defense of the Soviet Union, later the reception of the Minister of Defense of Russia);
- Since 1942 – the Kremlin.

Throughout the war, the headquarters was located in Moscow. This was of great moral importance. In connection with the threat of enemy air strikes at the beginning of July, it was transferred from the Kremlin to the Kirov Gate area to a small mansion with reliable work space and communications, and a month later, operators of the General Staff were stationed nearby, on the platform of the Kirovskaya metro station – working body of the headquarters.

— Georgy Zhukov

== Documents ==
- "On the Establishment of the Headquarters of the Main Command of the Armed Forces of the Soviet Union"
- "On the Transformation of the Headquarters of the Main Command and the Creation of the Main Commands of the North–West, West and South–West Directions"

== See also ==
- Supreme Commander–in–Chief
- Reserve of the Supreme High Command
- Headquarters of the Supreme Commander–in–Chief (World War I)
- Order No. 270
- Order No. 227

== Sources ==
- Alexander Vasilevsky. Life's Work. 4th Edition. Moscow, Publishing House of Political Literature of the Central Committee of the Communist Party of the Soviet Union, 1983
- Team of Authors. The Great Patriotic War (1941–1945): Dictionary–Reference Book / Edited by Mikhail Kiryan – 2nd Edition – Moscow: Publishing House of Political Literature of the Central Committee of the Communist Party of the Soviet Union, 1988 – ISBN 5-250-00107-6
- Military Encyclopedic Dictionary. Moscow, Military Publishing House, 1984
- Yuri Gorkov. Joseph Stalin and the Headquarters of the Supreme High Command // Military History Journal – 1995 – No. 3 – Pages 20–25
- Yuri Gorkov. On the History of the Creation of the State Defense Committee and the Headquarters of the Supreme High Command. Based on New Archival Materials // "New and Contemporary History" – 1999 – No. 4 – Pages 17–34
- Yuri Gorkov. Kremlin. Headquarters. General Base – Tver: RIF LTD, 1995 – 384 Pages
- Kuznetsov, Nikolay (1969). The Day Before. Military Memoirs. Moscow: Military Publishing House of the Ministry of Defense of the Soviet Union.
