= Order of Victory =

Soviet military award

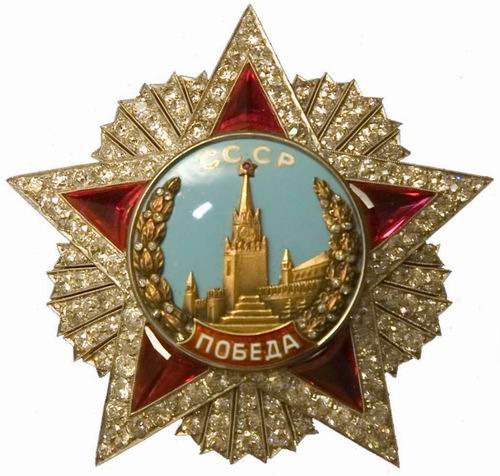
- The Order of Victory
- Type: Single-grade order
- Awarded for: Conducting combat operations involving one or more army groups and resulting in a "successful operation within the framework of one or several fronts resulting in a radical change of the situation in favor of the Red Army"
- Presented by: Soviet Union
- Eligibility: Military Generals and Marshals only
- Status: No longer awarded
- Established: November 8, 1943
- First award: April 10, 1944
- Final award: February 20, 1978 (was revoked)

Highlights
- Total: 20
- Ribbon of the Order of Victory

The Order of Victory (Russian: Орден «Победа», romanized: Orden "Pobeda") was the highest military decoration awarded for World War II service in the Soviet Union, and one of the rarest orders in the world. The order was awarded only to Generals and Marshals for successfully conducting combat operations involving one or more army groups and resulting in a "successful operation within the framework of one or several fronts resulting in a radical change of the situation in favor of the Red Army." The Order of Victory is a standalone decoration awarded specially for service in World War II; unlike other awards such as the Hero of the Soviet Union, it does not belong to any order of ranking. In the history of the Soviet Union, the award had been awarded twenty times to twelve Soviet leaders and five foreign leaders, with one revocation. The last living recipient was King Michael I of Romania, who died on 5 December 2017.

== History ==
The order was proposed by Colonel N. S. Neyelov, who was serving at the Soviet Army Rear headquarters around June 1943. The original name that Colonel Neyelov suggested was Order for Faithfulness to the Homeland; however, it was given its present name around October of that year.

On October 25, 1943, artist A. I. Kuznetsov, who was already the designer of many Soviet orders, presented his first sketch to Stalin. The sketch of a round medallion with portraits of Lenin and Stalin was not approved by the Supreme Commander. Instead, Stalin wanted a design with the Spasskaya Tower in the centre. Kuznetsov returned four days later with several new sketches, of which Stalin chose one entitled "Victory". He asked Kuznetsov to slightly alter the design, and on the 5th of November a prototype was finally approved. The order was officially adopted on November 8, 1943, and was first awarded to Georgy Zhukov, Aleksandr Vasilevsky, and Joseph Stalin. All three were awarded a second order a year or more later.

The order was also bestowed to top commanders of the Allied forces. Every order was presented during or immediately after World War II, except for the controversial 1978 award to Leonid Brezhnev, who was not given a personal award, but an older one, originally awarded to Leonid Govorov, Marshal of the Soviet Union. (Govorov was already deceased, with his award returned to the state) Brezhnev's award was revoked posthumously in 1989 for not meeting the requirements for the award.

Like other orders awarded by Communist nations, the Order of Victory could be awarded more than once to the same individual. In total, the order was presented twenty times to seventeen people (including Brezhnev).

Unlike all other Soviet orders, the Order of Victory had no serial number on it, the number was only mentioned in the award certificate. After a holder of the Order of Victory died, the award was to be given back to the state. Most of awards are now preserved by the Diamond Fund in the Moscow Kremlin. Notable exceptions are King Michael I of Romania's Order of Victory, which is held in the collection of the Romanian Royal Family, Dwight D. Eisenhower's Order of Victory, which is on display at the Dwight D. Eisenhower Presidential Library and Museum in Abilene, Kansas, Field Marshal Bernard Montgomery's Order of Victory, which is on display at the Imperial War Museum in London, and Josip Broz Tito's Order of Victory, which is kept in the Museum of Yugoslav History in Belgrade.

== Construction details ==
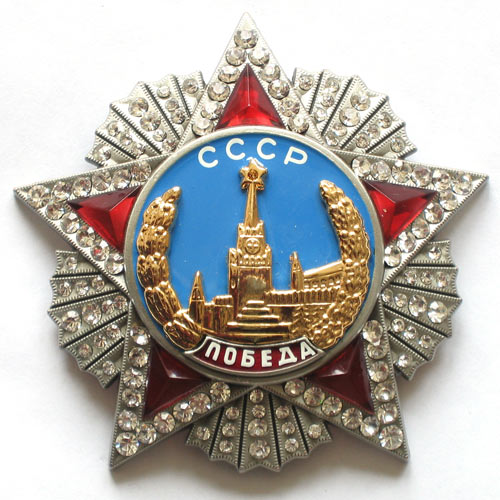
The Soviet Order of Victory

Against the sky, the letters "СССР" (USSR) appear in white enamel centered on the top of the medallion, while the word "Победа" (Victory) in white, is displayed on the red banner at the bottom, also made with enamel. The total mass of the order is 78g, which consists of 47g of platinum, 2g of gold, 19g of silver, and 16 carats of diamond. The rubies in the Order are artificial, as natural rubies would differ too much in color. The medal is estimated to be worth $10 million.

Instead of being made at a mint, each Order was made in a jeweler's workshop.

Dwight D. Eisenhower had his star valued by an American jeweler; according to Bernhard, Prince Consort of the Netherlands (who, having been Commander of the Dutch Armed Forces during the war, was interested in receiving such a prestigious award himself but never got it), Eisenhower told him that his stones were "fakes".

== Ribbon ==
The Order Ribbon.

The ribbons of various Soviet orders have been combined to create the Order Ribbon. The total length of the ribbon is 44 mm and it is mostly worn on the field uniform. The following featured orders are depicted on the ribbon (read from outside towards the center):

- Order of Glory (Орден Славы/Orden Slavy). Orange with black center stripe
- Order of Bogdan Khmelnitsky (Орден Богдана Хмельницкого/Orden Bogdana Khmelnitskogo). Light blue stripe
- Order of Alexander Nevsky (Орден Александра Невского/Orden Aleksandra Nevskogo). Dark red stripe
- Order of Kutuzov (Орден Кутузова/Orden Kutuzova). Dark blue stripe
- Order of Suvorov (Орден Суворова/Orden Suvorova). Green stripe
- Order of Lenin (Орден Ленина/Orden Lenina). Large Red stripe (center section)

== List of recipients ==
#	Date	Name	Image	Died	Note
1	April 10, 1944	(Soviet Union) Georgy Zhukov		June 18, 1974	
2	April 10, 1944	(Soviet Union) Aleksandr Vasilevsky		December 5, 1977	
3	April 10, 1944	(Soviet Union) Joseph Stalin		March 5, 1953	
4	March 30, 1945	(Soviet Union) (Poland) Konstantin Rokossovsky		August 3, 1968	
5	March 30, 1945	(Soviet Union) Ivan Konev		May 21, 1973	
6	April 19, 1945	(Soviet Union) Aleksandr Vasilevsky		December 5, 1977	(2nd time)
7	April 26, 1945	(Soviet Union) Rodion Malinovsky		March 31, 1967	
8	April 26, 1945	(Soviet Union) Fyodor Tolbukhin		October 17, 1949	
9	May 31, 1945	(Soviet Union) Leonid Govorov		March 19, 1955	
10	May 31, 1945	(Soviet Union) Georgy Zhukov		June 18, 1974	(2nd time)
11	June 4, 1945	(Soviet Union) Semyon Timoshenko		March 31, 1970	
12	June 4, 1945	(Soviet Union) Aleksei Antonov		June 18, 1962	
13	June 5, 1945	(United Kingdom) Bernard Montgomery		March 24, 1976	
14	June 10, 1945	(United States) Dwight D. Eisenhower		March 28, 1969	
15	June 26, 1945	(Soviet Union) Joseph Stalin		March 5, 1953	(2nd time)
16	July 6, 1945	(Kingdom of Romania) Michael I of Romania		December 5, 2017	
17	August 9, 1945	(Poland) Michał Rola-Żymierski		October 15, 1989	
18	September 8, 1945	(Soviet Union) Kirill Meretskov		December 30, 1968	
19	September 9, 1945	(Socialist Federal Republic of Yugoslavia) Josip Broz Tito		May 4, 1980	
20	February 20, 1978	(Soviet Union) ~~Leonid Brezhnev~~		November 10, 1982	Revoked posthumously in 1989 (Note: Brezhnev's receipt of the Order of Victory was controversial. Brezhnev was a young political commissar during the war who did reach the rank of lieutenant general (two-star rank), but did not command responsibility close to the other recipients of the Order. He only received the decoration after he was General Secretary of the Communist Party and thus able to essentially award the medal to himself. As a result of general hostility to Brezhnev after his death and belief that this award had been done out of vanity rather than earned from merit, the Order of Victory was posthumously revoked in 1989.)

== Fate of the Orders ==
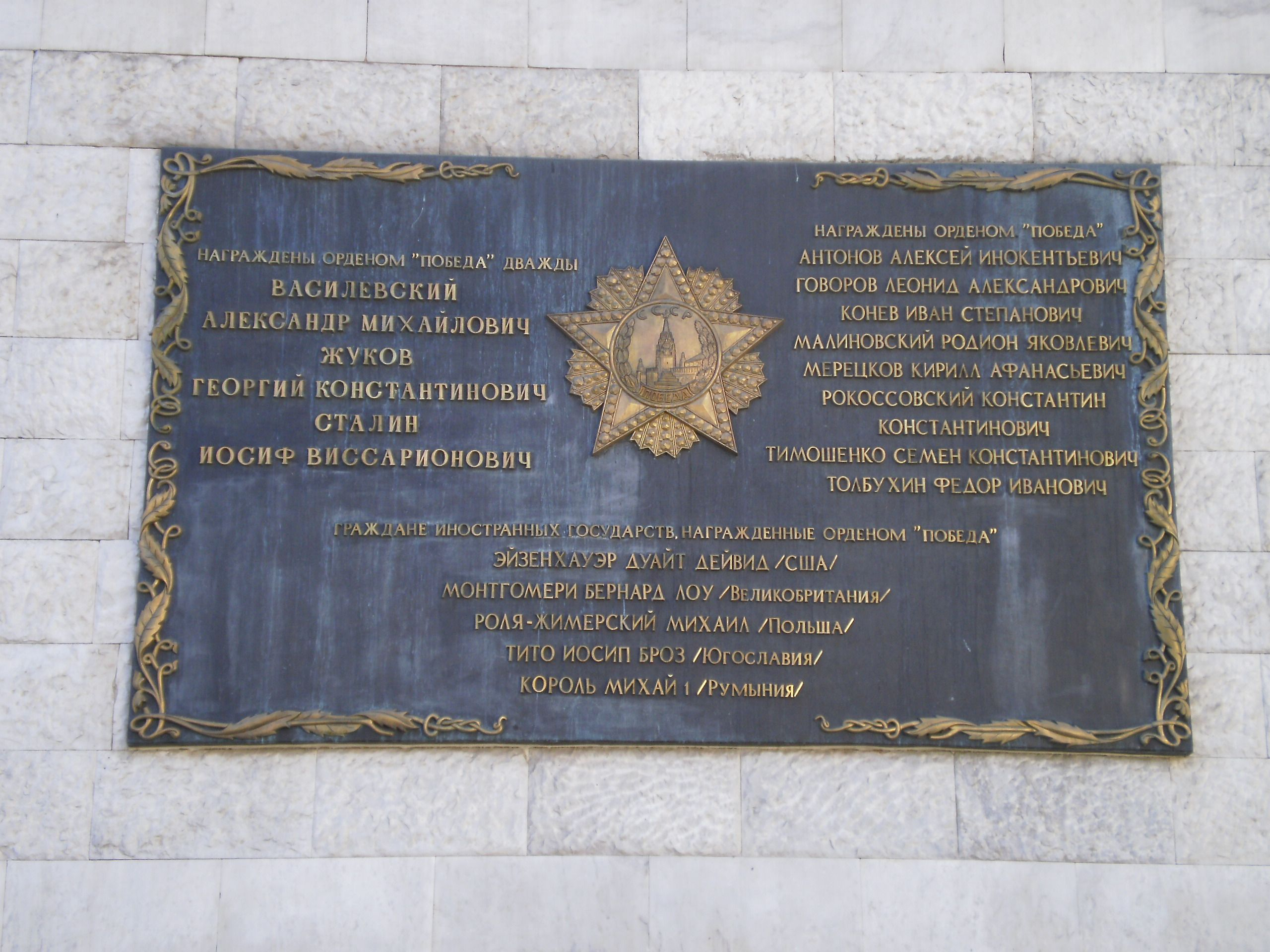
Plaque (2000) at the Grand Kremlin Palace in Moscow, listing the recipients of the Order of Victory. Brezhnev's name is not on the plaque, as his award was revoked in 1989.

After the death of the recipient of the Order of Victory, it was to be given back to the state.

- All orders awarded to Soviet commanders are in Russia.
  - The Central Armed Forces Museum in Moscow has five orders: two of Vasilevsky, two of Zhukov and one of Malinovsky.
  - The State Precious Metals and Gems Repository (Gokhran) in Russia has two orders: Rokossovski, and Rola-Żymierski.
  - All other orders that are in Russia are stored in the Moscow Kremlin, preserved by the Diamond Fund.
- King Michael I of Romania (d. 2017) was for 28 years the only living holder, following the death in 1989 of M. Rola-Żymierski; his order is held in the Royal Collection of the Romanian Royal Family.
- Tito's order is at the Museum of Yugoslavia, Belgrade (former the May 25th Museum)
- Dwight D. Eisenhower's Order is on display at the Dwight D. Eisenhower Presidential Library and Museum in Abilene, Kansas.
- Bernard Montgomery's Order is in the Imperial War Museum in London.

== See also ==
- Orders, decorations, and medals of the Soviet Union
