= Aleksandr Vasilevsky =

Soviet general (1895–1977)

- Александр Василевский
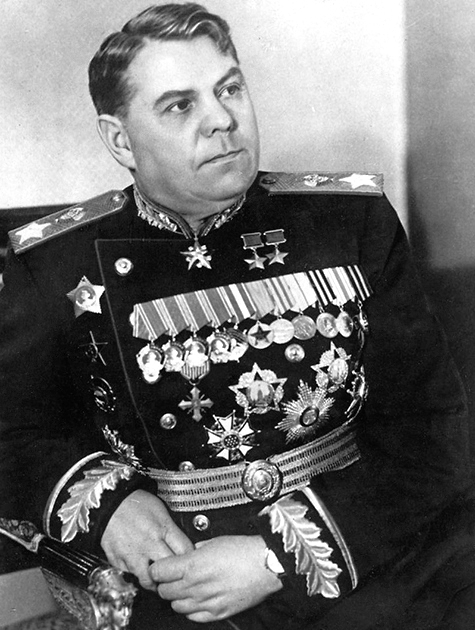
- Vasilevsky in 1946

Minister of War
- In office 25 February 1950 – 15 March 1953
- Premier: Joseph Stalin (1950–1953); Georgy Malenkov (1953)
- Preceded by: Position established
- Succeeded by: Position abolished (Post re-established as Ministry of Defence, with Nikolai Bulganin succeeding)

Minister of the Armed Forces
- In office 24 March 1949 – 25 February 1950
- Premier: Joseph Stalin
- Preceded by: Nikolai Bulganin
- Succeeded by: Position abolished (Himself as Minister of War)

Personal details
- Born: 30 September 1895 Novaya Golchikha, Russian Empire
- Died: 5 December 1977 (aged 82) Moscow, Soviet Union
- Resting place: Kremlin Wall Necropolis
- Awards: Hero of the Soviet Union (2); Order of Victory (2); Order of Suvorov, 1st Class; Order of Lenin (8); Order of the Red Banner (2); Virtuti Militari

Military service
- Allegiance: Russian Empire; Soviet Russia; Soviet Union
- Years of service: 1915–1959
- Rank: Marshal of the Soviet Union
- Commands: Chief of the General Staff; 3rd Belorussian Front; Far East Command
- Battles/wars: World War I; Russian Civil War; Polish–Soviet War; World War II; Winter War; Eastern Front; Operation Barbarossa; Battle of Moscow; Second Battle of Kharkov; Battle of Stalingrad; Voronezh–Kastornoye offensive; Battle of Kursk; Battle of the Dnieper; Dnieper–Carpathian offensive; Operation Bagration; East Prussian offensive; Battle of Königsberg; Soviet–Japanese War; Invasion of Manchuria

Aleksandr Mikhaylovich Vasilevsky (Note: In this name that follows East Slavic naming customs, the patronymic is Mikhaylovich and the family name is Vasilevsky.) (Note: Russian: Александр Михайлович Василевский) (30 September [O.S. 10 September] 1895 – 5 December 1977) was a Soviet general who served as a top commander during World War II and achieved the rank of Marshal of the Soviet Union. During World War II, he served as the chief of the General Staff and deputy Minister of Defense, and later served as Minister of Defense from 1949 to 1953.

Born in central Russia, Vasilevsky began his military career in the Imperial Russian Army during World War I and earned the rank of captain by 1917. After the October Revolution of 1917 and the start of the Russian Civil War, he was conscripted into the Red Army and took part in the Polish-Soviet War. Following the war, Vasilevsky quickly rose through the ranks, and in 1931 was appointed to the Directorate of Military Training. In 1939, after Joseph Stalin's Great Purge, he was appointed deputy chief of operations of the Red Army.

Soon after the German invasion of the Soviet Union in June 1941, Vasilevsky was promoted to chief of operations and deputy chief of the general staff on the recommendation of his mentor Boris Shaposhnikov. In June 1942, he succeeded Shaposhnikov as chief of the general staff, and also became deputy minister of defense that October. In these capacities, Vasilevsky coordinated fronts and often planned offensives in collaboration with Georgy Zhukov, particularly at the Battle of Kursk in 1943 and in Operation Bagration in 1944. He was made a Marshal of the Soviet Union in February 1943 after playing a key role at the Battle of Stalingrad. In February 1945, Vasilevsky gained command of the 3rd Belorussian Front in Germany and stepped down as chief of the general staff. After Germany's surrender, he was appointed commander-in-chief of Soviet forces in the Far East in July 1945 and carried out the invasion of Manchuria that August.

After the war, Vasilevsky again served as chief of the general staff from 1946 to 1948, and as Soviet Defense Minister from 1949 until after Stalin's death in 1953. After Nikita Khrushchev's rise to the Soviet leadership, Vasilevsky was removed from his positions in 1957. After his death in 1977, he was buried in the Kremlin Wall Necropolis in recognition of his past service and contributions to his country.

== Biography ==
=== Childhood and early years ===
Vasilevsky was born on September 30, 1895, in Novaya Golchikha in the Kineshma Uyezd (now part of the city of Vichuga, Ivanovo Oblast) in a family of Russian ethnicity. Vasilevsky was the fourth of eight children. His father, Mikhail Aleksandrovich Vasilevsky, was a priest to the nearby St. Nicholas Church. His mother, Nadezhda Ivanovna Sokolova, was the daughter of a priest in the nearby village of Ugletz. Vasilevsky reportedly broke off all contact with his parents after 1926 because of his Communist Party membership and his military duties in the Red Army; three of his brothers did so also. However, the family resumed relations in 1940, following Joseph Stalin's suggestion that they do so.

According to Vasilevsky, his family was extremely poor. His father spent most of his time working to earn money, while the children assisted by working in the fields. In 1897, the family moved to Novopokrovskoe, where his father became a priest to the newly built Ascension Church, and where Aleksandr began his education in the church school. In 1909, he entered Kostroma seminary, which required considerable financial sacrifice on the part of his parents. The same year, a ministerial directive preventing former seminarists from starting university studies initiated a nationwide seminarist movement, with classes stopping in most Russian seminaries. Vasilevsky, among others, was expelled from Kostroma, and only returned several months later, after the seminarists' demands had been satisfied.

=== World War I and Civil war ===
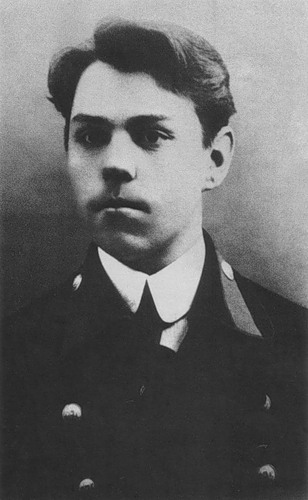
Vasilevsky as an officer in the Imperial Russian Army in 1914

After completing his studies in the seminary and spending a few years working as a teacher, Vasilevsky intended to become an agronomist or a surveyor, but the outbreak of the First World War changed his plans. According to his own words, he was "overwhelmed with patriotic feelings" and decided to become a soldier instead. Vasilevsky took his exams in January 1915 and entered the Alexander Military Law Academy in February. As he recalls, "I did not decide to become an officer to start a military career. I still wanted to be an agronomist and work in some remote corner of Russia after the war. I could not suppose that my country would change, and I would." After four months of courses that he later considered to be completely outdated, theoretical, and inappropriate for modern warfare, he was sent to the front with the rank of zauryad-praporshchik, the highest non-commissioned rank in the Russian infantry, in May 1915.

From June to September, Vasilevsky was assigned to a series of reserve regiments, and finally arrived at the front in September as a half-company commander (polurotny) in the 409th Novokhopersky regiment, 109th division, 9th Army. In the spring of 1916, Vasilevsky took command of a company, which eventually became one of the most recognized in the regiment. In May 1916, he led his men during the Brusilov offensive, becoming a battalion commander after heavy casualties among officers, and gaining the rank of captain by age 22.

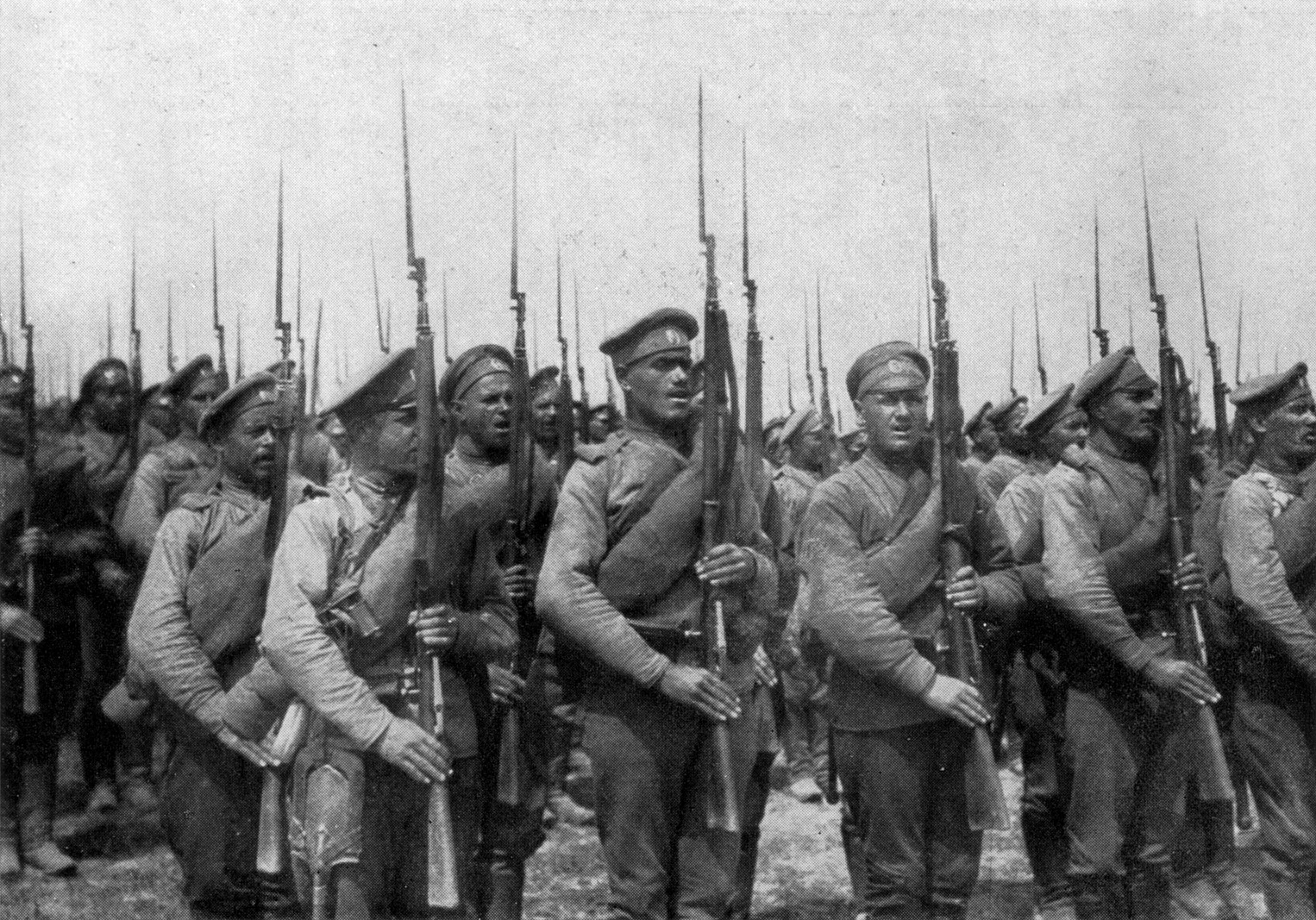
World War I Russian infantry.

In November 1917, just after the Russian Revolution, Vasilevsky decided to end his military career. As he wrote in his memoirs, "There was a time when I led soldiers to battle, thinking I was doing my duty as a Russian patriot. However, I understood that we have been cheated, that people needed peace.... Therefore, my military career had to end. With no remorse, I could go back to my favorite occupation, working in the field." He travelled from Romania, where his unit was deployed in 1917, back to his own village.

In December 1917, while back at home, Vasilevsky learned that the men of the 409th regiment, which had been relocated to Ukraine, had elected him as their commander (at the start of the Russian Revolution, commanders were elected by their own men). However, the local military authorities recommended that he decline the proposal because of the heavy fighting taking place in Ukraine between pro-Soviet forces and the pro-independence Ukrainian government (the Central Rada). He followed this advice and became a drill instructor in his own Kineshma uezd. He retired in September 1918 and became a school teacher in the Tula Oblast.

In April 1919, Vasilevsky was again conscripted into the Red Army and sent to command a company fighting against peasant uprisings and assisting in the emergency Soviet policy of prodrazvyorstka, which required peasants to surrender agricultural surplus for a fixed price. Later that year, Vasilevsky took command of a new reserve battalion, and, in October 1919, of a regiment. However, his regiment never took part in the battles of the Russian Civil War, as Anton Denikin's troops never got close to Tula. In December 1919, Vasilevsky was sent to the Western front as a deputy regimental commander, participating in the Polish-Soviet War.

As deputy regimental commander of the 427th regiment, 32nd brigade, 11th division, Vasilevsky participated at the Battle of Berezina, pulling back as the Polish forces had been slowly but steadily advancing eastward, and in the subsequent counterattack that began on May 14, 1920, breaking through Polish lines before being stopped by cavalry counterattacks. Later, starting from July 4, 1920, he took part in the Soviet offensive towards Wilno, advancing to the Neman River despite heavy Polish resistance and German fortifications erected in the region during World War I. Vasilevsky's regiment arrived near Wilno by mid-July and stayed there on garrison duty until the Polish-Soviet War ended with the signing (18 March 1921) of the Treaty of Riga.

=== The interwar period ===
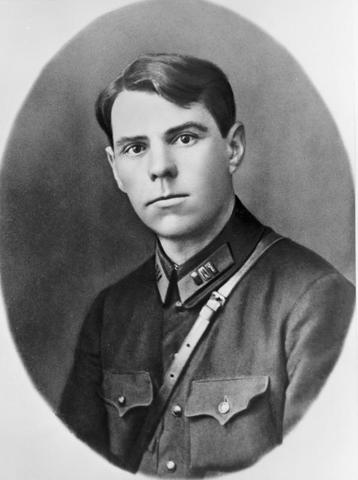
Regimental Commander Aleksandr Vasilevsky in 1928

After the Treaty of Riga, Vasilevsky fought against remaining White forces and peasant uprisings in Belarus and in the Smolensk Oblast until August 1921. By 1930, he had served as the regimental commander of the 142nd, 143rd, and 144th rifle regiments, where he showed great skill in organizing and training his troops. In 1928, he graduated from the Vystrel regimental commander's course. During these years, Vasilevsky established friendships with higher commanders and Party members, including Kliment Voroshilov, Vladimir Triandafillov and Boris Shaposhnikov. Shaposhnikov, in particular, would become Vasilevsky's protector until the former's death in 1945. Vasilevsky's connections and good performance earned him an appointment to the Directorate of Military Training in 1931.

While at the Directorate of Military Training, Vasilevsky supervised the Red Army's training and worked on military manuals and field books. He also met several senior military commanders, such as Mikhail Tukhachevsky and Georgy Zhukov, then the Deputy Cavalry Inspector of the Red Army. Zhukov would later characterize Vasilevsky as "a man who knew his job as he spent a long time commanding a regiment and who earned great respect from everybody." In 1934, Vasilevsky was appointed to be the Senior Military Training Supervisor of the Volga Military District (Privolzhsky voyenny okrug). In 1937, he entered the Academy of the General Staff, where he studied important aspects of military strategy and other topics under experienced generals, including Mikhail Tukhachevsky.

By mid-1937, Stalin's Great Purge eliminated a significant number of senior military commanders, vacating a number of positions on the General Staff. To his amazement, Vasilevsky was appointed to the General Staff in October 1937 and held "responsible for operational training of senior officers." In 1938, he was made a member of the Communist Party of the Soviet Union (a sine qua non condition for a successful career in the Soviet Union); in 1939, he was appointed Deputy Commander of the Operations Directorate of the General Staff, while holding the rank of divisional commander. While in this position he and Shaposhnikov were responsible for the planning of the Winter War, and after the Moscow peace treaty, for setting the demarcation line with Finland.

As a senior officer, Vasilevsky met frequently with Joseph Stalin. During one of these meetings, Stalin asked Vasilevsky about his family. Since Vasilevsky's father was a priest and thus a potential "enemy of the people", Vasilevsky said that he had ended his relationship with them in 1926. Stalin, surprised, suggested that he reestablish his family ties at once, and help his parents with whatever needs they might have.

=== World War II ===
==== Start and Battle of Moscow ====
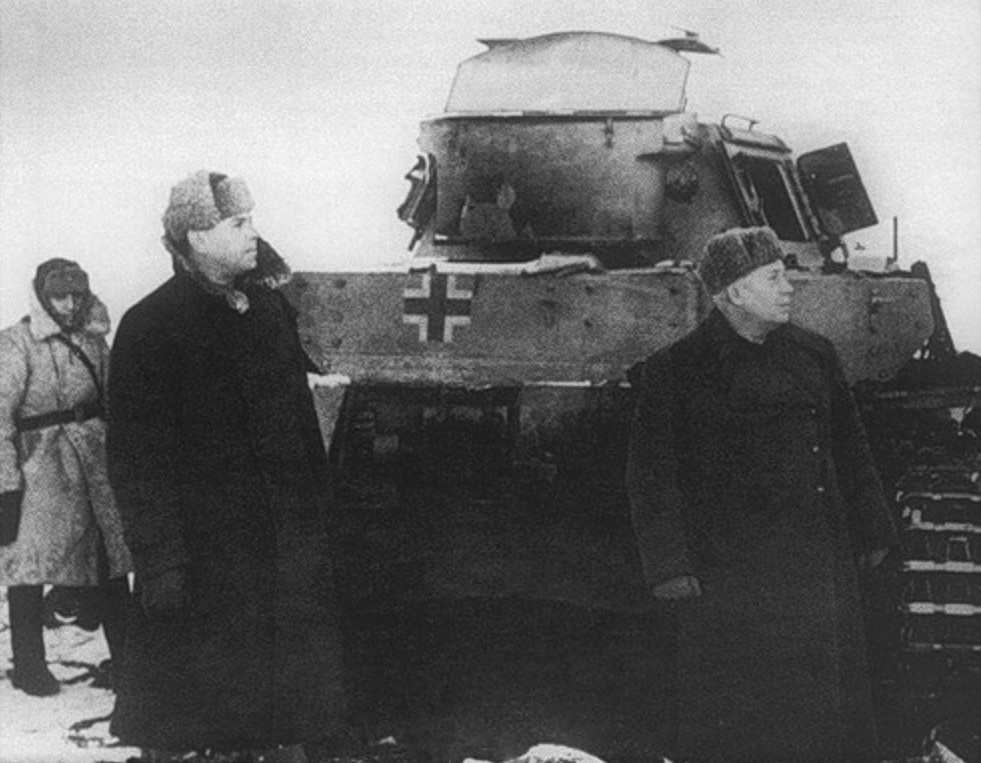
Vasilevsky (left) and Nikita Khrushchev inspect German equipment destroyed near Stalingrad, 1943

By June 1941, Vasilevsky was working around the clock in his General Staff office. On June 22, 1941, he learned of the German bombing of several important military and civilian objectives, starting Operation Barbarossa. In August 1941, Vasilevsky was appointed Chief of the Operations Directorate of the General Staff and Deputy Chief of the General Staff, making him one of the key figures in the Soviet military leadership. At the end of September 1941, Vasilevsky gave a speech before the General Staff, describing the situation as extremely difficult, but pointing out that the northern part of the front was holding, that Leningrad still offered resistance, and that such a situation would potentially allow some reserves to be gathered in the northern part of the front.

In October 1941, the situation at the front was becoming critical, with German forces advancing towards Moscow during Operation Typhoon. As a representative of the Soviet General Staff (Stavka), Vasilevsky was sent to the Western Front to coordinate the defense and guarantee a flow of supplies and men towards the region of Mozhaisk, where Soviet forces were attempting to contain the German advance. During heavy fighting near the outskirts of Moscow, Vasilevsky spent all of his available time both in the Stavka and on the front line trying to coordinate the three fronts committed to Moscow's defense. When most of the General Staff (including its chief Marshal Shaposhnikov) was evacuated from Moscow, Vasilevsky remained in the city as liaison between the Moscow Staff and the evacuated members of the General Staff. In his memoirs, Nikita Khrushchev described Vasilevsky as an "able specialist" even so early in the war. On October 28, 1941, Vasilevsky was promoted to Lieutenant General.

The Battle of Moscow was a very difficult period in Vasilevsky's life, with the Wehrmacht approaching close enough to the city for German officers to make out some of Moscow's buildings through their field glasses. As he recalls, his workday often ended at 4 a.m. Moreover, with Marshal Shaposhnikov having fallen ill, Vasilevsky had to make important decisions by himself. On October 29, 1941, a bomb exploded in the courtyard of the General Staff. Vasilevsky was slightly wounded but continued working. The kitchen was damaged by the explosion, and the General Staff was relocated underground without hot food. Nevertheless, the Staff continued to function. In December 1941, Vasilevsky coordinated the Moscow counteroffensive, and by early 1942, the general counteroffensive in the Moscow and Rostov directions, further motivated in his work by the return of his evacuated family to Moscow. In April 1942, he coordinated the unsuccessful elimination of the Demyansk pocket, the encirclement of the German 2nd Army Corps near Leningrad. On April 24, with Shaposhnikov seriously ill again, Vasilevsky was appointed as acting Chief of Staff and promoted to Colonel General on April 26.

==== Summer and fall 1942 ====
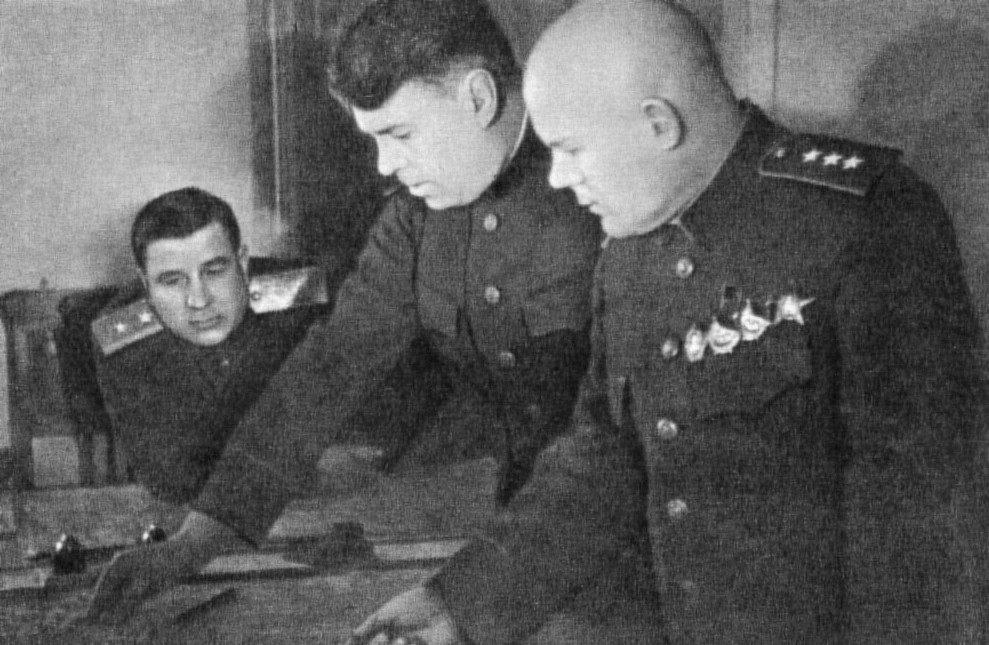
Vasilevsky (center) with Colonel-General Filipp Golikov (right) coordinating operations during the Voronezh–Kharkov offensive, 1943

In May 1942 one of the most controversial episodes in Vasilevsky's career occurred: the Second Battle of Kharkov, a failed counteroffensive that led to a stinging Red Army defeat, and ultimately to a successful German offensive (Operation Blue) in the south. After repelling the enemy from Moscow, Soviet morale was high and Stalin was determined to launch another general counteroffensive during the summer. However, Vasilevsky recognized that "the reality was more harsh than that." Following Stalin's orders, the Kharkov offensive was launched on May 12, 1942. When the threat of encirclement became obvious, Vasilevsky and Zhukov asked for permission to withdraw the advancing Soviet forces. Stalin refused, leading to the encirclement of the Red Army forces and a total defeat. In his memoirs, Khrushchev accused Vasilevsky of being too passive and indecisive, as well as being unable to defend his point of view in front of Stalin during that particular operation. As he wrote, "It was my view that the catastrophe... could have been avoided if Vasilevsky had taken the position he should have. He could have taken a different position... but he didn't do that, and as a result, in my view, he had a hand in the destruction of thousands of Red Army fighters in the Kharkov campaign."

In June 1942, Vasilevsky was briefly sent to Leningrad to coordinate an attempt to break the encirclement of the 2nd Shock Army led by General Andrei Vlasov. On June 26, 1942, Vasilevsky was appointed Chief of the General Staff, and, in October 1942, Deputy Minister of Defense. He was now one of the few people responsible for the global planning of Soviet offensives. Starting from July 23, 1942, Vasilevsky was a Stavka representative on the Stalingrad front, which he correctly anticipated as the main axis of attack.

The Battle of Stalingrad was another difficult period in Vasilevsky's life. Sent with Zhukov to the Stalingrad Front, he tried to coordinate the defenses of Stalingrad with radio links working intermittently, at best. On September 12, 1942, during a meeting with Stalin, Vasilevsky and Zhukov presented their plan for the Stalingrad counteroffensive after an all-night planning session. Two months later, on November 19, with Stalingrad still unconquered, Operation Uranus was launched. Since Zhukov had been sent to near Rzhev to execute Operation Mars (the Rzhev counteroffensive), Vasilevsky remained near Stalingrad to coordinate the double-pincer attack that ultimately led to the German defeat and annihilation of the armies entrapped in the cauldron, all a result of the plan he had presented to Stalin on December 9. This plan sparked some debate between Vasilevsky and Rokossovsky, who wanted an additional army for clearing Stalingrad, which Rokossovsky continued to mention to Vasilevsky even years after the war. The army in question was Rodion Malinovsky's 2nd Guards' which Vasilevsky committed against a dangerous German counter-attack launched from Kotelnikovo by the 57th Panzer corps that was designed to deblockade the Stalingrad pocket.

==== Soviet victory ====
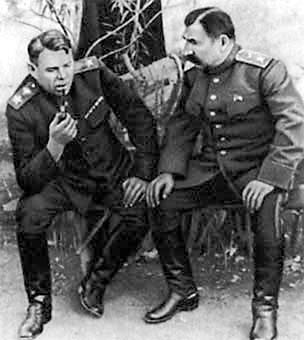
Vasilevsky and Budyonny in the Donbas, 1943

In January 1943, Vasilevsky coordinated the offensives on the upper Don River near Voronezh and Ostrogozhsk, leading to decisive encirclements of several Axis divisions. In mid-January, Vasilevsky was promoted to General of the Army and only 29 days later, on February 16, 1943, to Marshal of the Soviet Union.

In March 1943, after the creation of the Kursk salient and the failure of the Third Battle of Kharkov, Stalin and the Stavka had to decide if the offensive should be resumed despite this setback, or if it was better to adopt a defensive stance. Vasilevsky and Zhukov managed to persuade Stalin that it was necessary to halt the offensive for now, and wait for the initiative from the Wehrmacht. When it became clear that the supposed German offensive was postponed and would no longer take place in May 1943 as expected, Vasilevsky successfully defended continuing to wait for the Wehrmacht to attack, rather than making a preemptive strike as Khrushchev wanted. When the Battle of Kursk finally began on July 4, 1943, Vasilevsky was responsible for coordinating the Voronezh and Steppe Fronts. After the German failure at Kursk and the start of the general counteroffensive on the left bank of the Dnieper, Vasilevsky planned and executed offensive operations in the Donbas region. Later that year, he developed and executed the clearing of Nazi forces from Crimea.

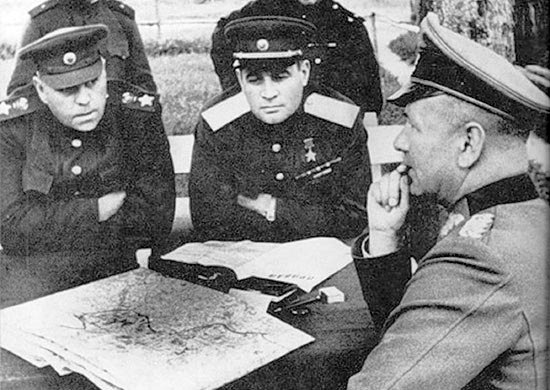
Marshal Vasilevsky (left) and General Ivan Chernyakhovsky interrogate captured Lieutenant General Alfons Hitter in Germany, 1944

At the start of 1944, Vasilevsky coordinated the Soviet offensive on the right bank of the Dnieper, leading to a decisive victory in eastern Ukraine. On April 10, 1944, the day Odessa was retaken, Vasilevsky was presented with the Order of Victory, only the second ever awarded (the first having been awarded to Zhukov). Vasilevsky's car rolled over a mine during an inspection of Sevastopol after the fighting ended on May 10, 1944. He received a head wound, cut by flying glass, and was evacuated to Moscow for recovery.

During Operation Bagration, the general counteroffensive in Belarus, Vasilevsky coordinated the offensives of the 1st Baltic and 3rd Belorussian Fronts. When Soviet forces entered the Baltic states, Vasilevsky assumed complete responsibility for all the Baltic fronts, discarding the 3rd Belorussian. On July 29, 1944, he was made Hero of the Soviet Union for his military successes. In February 1945, Vasilevsky was again appointed commander of 3rd Belorussian Front to lead the East Prussian Operation, leaving the post of General Chief of Staff to Aleksei Antonov. As a front commander, Vasilevsky led the East Prussian operation and organized the assaults on Königsberg and Pillau. He also negotiated the surrender of the Königsberg garrison with its commander, Otto Lasch. After the war, Lasch said that Vasilevsky did not respect the guarantees made during the city's capitulation. Indeed, Vasilevsky promised that German soldiers would not be executed, that prisoners, civilians and wounded would be treated decently, and that all prisoners would return to Germany after the end of the war. Instead, Lasch remained in prison for 10 years and returned to Germany only in 1955, as did many of the Wehrmacht soldiers and officers, while all German population was expelled from Eastern Prussia. For the brilliant successes at Königsberg and in Eastern Prussia, Vasilevsky was awarded his second Order of Victory.

John Erickson wrote that: Vasilevskii is a much underestimated soldier, a figure who flits about Soviet historiography but a commander inured to the battlefield yet deft in his handling of the whole Soviet war machine.

==== Manchurian Strategic Offensive Operation ====
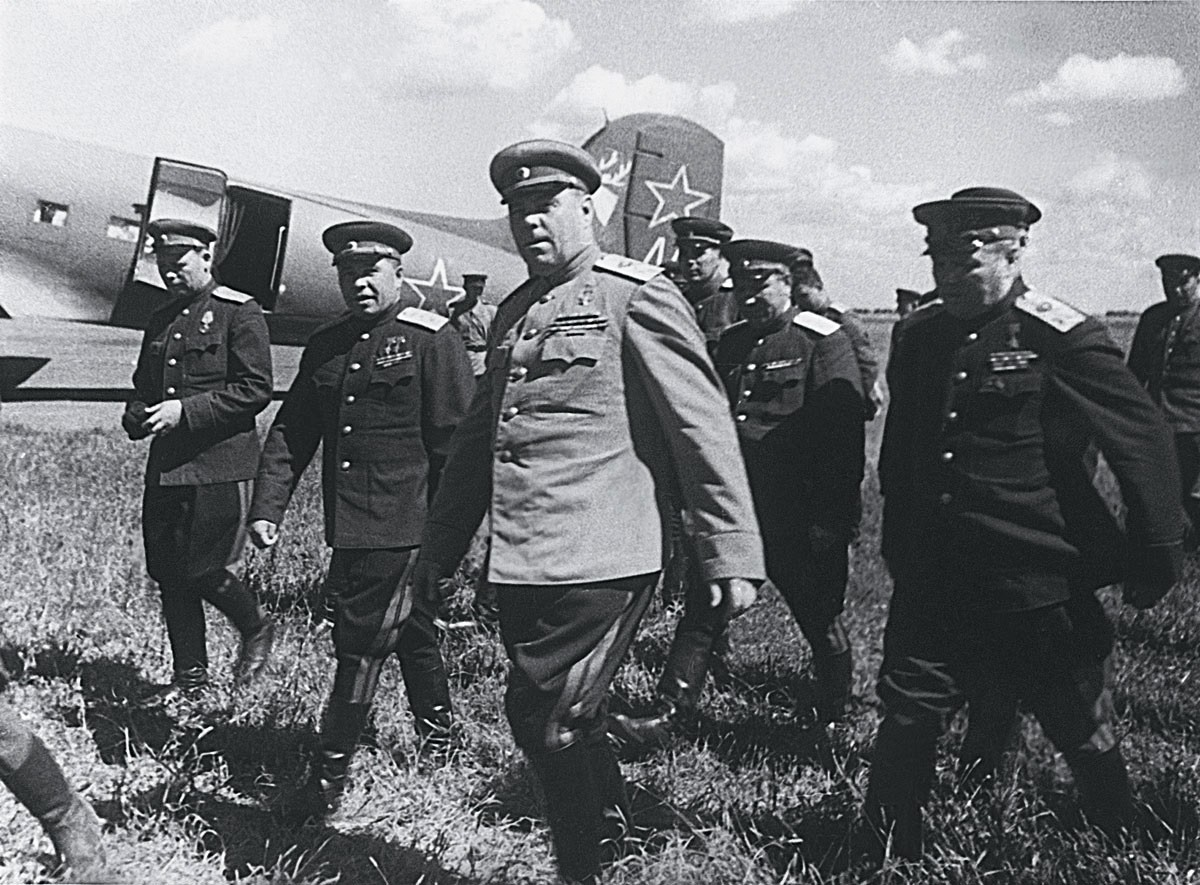
Vasilevsky in Port Arthur, China, 1945

During the 1944 summer offensive, Stalin announced that he would appoint Vasilevsky Commander-in-Chief of USSR Forces in the Far East once the war against Germany ended. Vasilevsky began drafting the war plan for Japan by late 1944 and began full-time preparation by April 27, 1945. In June 1945, Stalin approved his plan. Vasilevsky then received the appointment of Commander-in-Chief of USSR Forces in the Far East and travelled by armoured train to Chita to execute the plan.

During the preparation phase, Vasilevsky further rehearsed the offensive with his army commanders and directed the start of Manchurian Strategic Offensive Operation, also known as the Battle of Manchuria. In twenty-four days, from August 9 to September 2, 1945, Japanese armies in Manchukuo were defeated, with just 37,000 casualties out of 1,600,000 troops on the USSR side. For his success in this operation, Vasilevsky was awarded his second Hero of the Soviet Union decoration on September 8.

=== After World War II ===
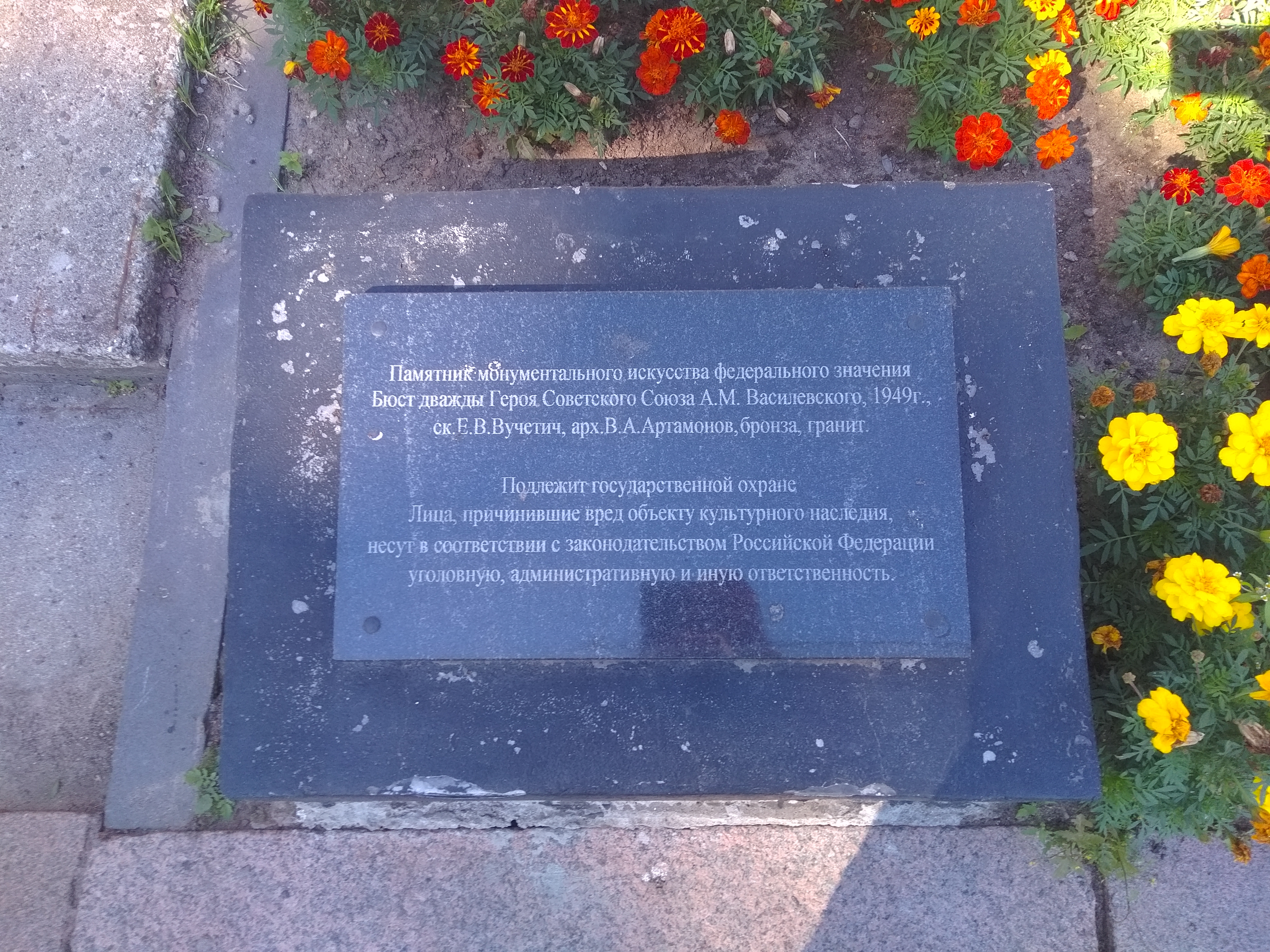
Kineshma Nameboard Bust of Aleksandr Vasilevsky

Between 1946 and 1949, Vasilevsky remained Chief of Staff, then became Defense Minister from 1949 to 1953. Following Stalin's death in 1953, Vasilevsky fell from grace and was replaced by Nikolai Bulganin, although he remained deputy Defense minister. In 1956, he was appointed Deputy Defense Minister for Military Science, a secondary position with no real military power. Vasilevsky would occupy this position for only one year before being pensioned off by Nikita Khrushchev, thus becoming a victim of the bloodless purge that also saw the end of Zhukov. In 1959, he was appointed a General Inspector of the Ministry of Defense, an honorary position. In 1973, he published his memoirs, The Cause of My Whole Life. Aleksandr Vasilevsky died on December 5, 1977, at the age of 82. His body was cremated and his ashes immured in the Kremlin Wall Necropolis.

== Family ==
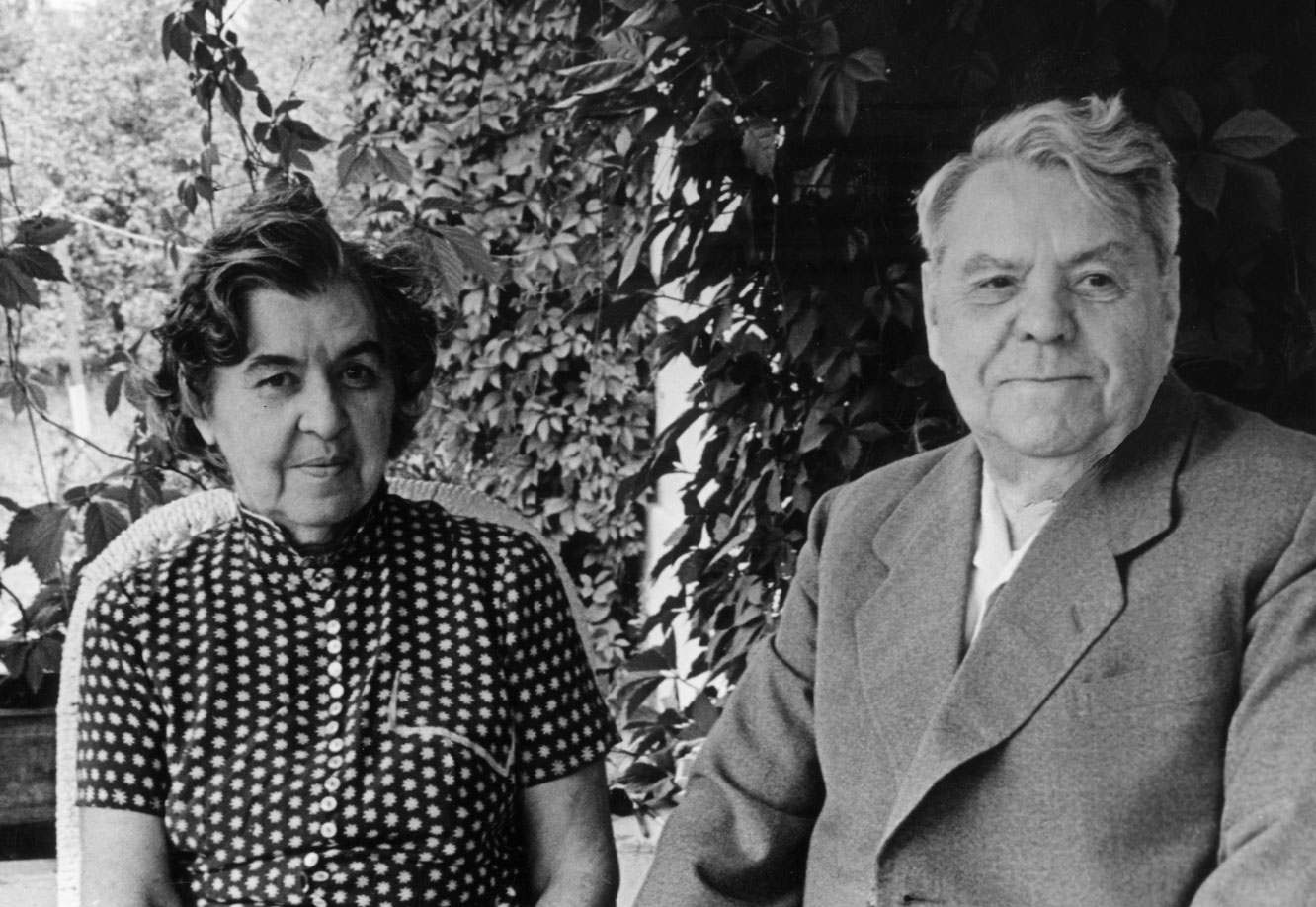
Vasilevsky with his wife Ekaterina (1975)

In 1923, Vasilevsky married Serafima Nikolaevna Voronova (1904–1980), before divorcing in 1934. The couple had a son named Yuri (1925–2013), who went on to become a lieutenant general in the Soviet Air Force. Yuri was married to Era Zhukova, daughter of Georgy Zhukov.

Vasilevsky later re-married to Ekaterina Vasilievna Saburova, with whom he had a son named Igor (born 1935). Igor went on to become a well-known architect, and was recipient of the title of Honored Architect of the Russian Federation and the State Prize of Czechoslovakia. Igor is married to the daughter of Soviet statesman Ivan Tevosian.

== Awards ==
In his memoirs, Vasilevsky recalls Stalin's astonishment when, at a ceremony taking place in the Kremlin on December 4, 1941, the Soviet leader saw just a single Order of the Red Star and the medal "XX years of the RKKA" on Vasilevsky's uniform. However, Vasilevsky eventually became one of the most decorated commanders in Soviet history.

Vasilevsky was awarded the Gold Star of Hero of the Soviet Union twice for operations on the German and Japanese fronts. He was awarded two Orders of Victory (an achievement matched only by Zhukov and Stalin) for his successes in Crimea and Prussia. During his career, he was awarded eight Orders of Lenin (several of them after the war), the Order of the October Revolution when it was created in 1967, two Orders of the Red Banner, a first class Order of Suvorov for his operations in Ukraine and Crimea, and his first decoration, an Order of the Red Star, earned in 1940 for his brilliant staff work during the Winter War. Finally, he was awarded a third class Order for Service to the Homeland as recognition for his entire military career when this order was created in 1974, just three years before Vasilevsky's death.

Vasilevsky was also awarded fourteen medals. For his participation in various campaigns, he was awarded the Defense of Leningrad, Defense of Moscow, Defense of Stalingrad and Capture of Königsberg medals. As with all Soviet soldiers who took part in the war with Germany and Japan, he was awarded the Medal For the Victory Over Germany and the Medal "For the Victory over Japan". He also received several commemorative medals, such as Twenty, Thirty, Forty, and Fifty Years Since the Creation of the Soviet Armed Forces medals, Twenty and Thirty Years Since the Victory in the Great Patriotic War medals, the Eight Hundredth Anniversary of Moscow medal (awarded in 1947 for his participation in the Battle of Moscow) and the Hundredth Birthday of Lenin medal. In addition to Soviet orders and medals, Vasilevsky was awarded several foreign decorations such as the Polish Virtuti Militari Order from the Polish communist government.

Soviet Union

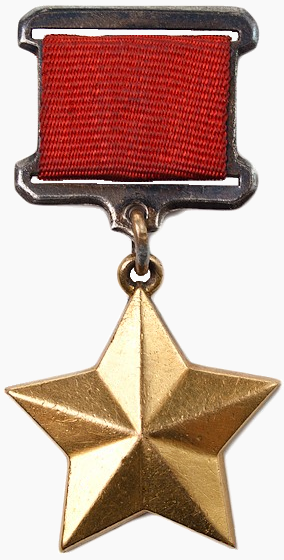
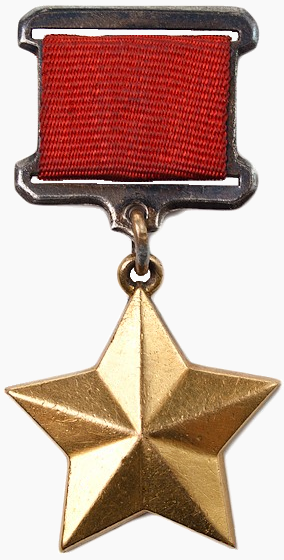

A reconstruction of Vasilevsky's ribbon bar, without foreign and Imperial era decorations

- "Gold Star" Hero of the Soviet Union, twice (29 July 1944, 8 September 1945)
- Order of Victory, twice (No. 2 and No. 7, 10 April 1944, 19 April 1945)
- Eight Orders of Lenin (21 May 1942, 29 July 1944, 21 February 1945, 29 September 1945, 29 September 1955, 29 September 1965, 29 September 1970, 29 September 1975)
- Order of the October Revolution (22 February 1968)
- Order of Red Banner, twice (3 November 1944, 20 June 1949)
- Order of Suvorov, 1st class (28 January 1943)
- Order of the Red Star (1939)
- Order for Service to the Homeland in the Armed Forces of the USSR, 3rd class (30 April 1975)
- "For military valour. To commemorate the 100th anniversary of the birth of Vladimir Ilyich Lenin"
- Medal "For the Defence of Moscow"
- Medal "For the Defence of Stalingrad"
- Medal "For the Capture of Königsberg"
- Medal "For the Victory over Germany in the Great Patriotic War 1941–1945"
- Medal "For the Victory over Japan"
- Jubilee Medal "Twenty Years of Victory in the Great Patriotic War 1941–1945"
- Jubilee Medal "Thirty Years of Victory in the Great Patriotic War 1941–1945"
- Medal "In Commemoration of the 800th Anniversary of Moscow"
- Medal "Veteran of the Armed Forces of the USSR"
- Jubilee Medal "XX Years of the Workers' and Peasants' Red Army"
- Jubilee Medal "30 Years of the Soviet Army and Navy"
- Jubilee Medal "40 Years of the Armed Forces of the USSR"
- Jubilee Medal "50 Years of the Armed Forces of the USSR"
- Honorary weapon with gold National Emblem of the USSR (1968)

Imperial Russia

| Order of Saint Anna, 4th class |
| Order of Saint Stanislaus, 3rd class |
| Cross of St. George, 4th class |

Foreign awards

| Order of Sukhbaatar, twice (Mongolia, 1966, 1971) |
| Order of the Red Banner (Mongolia, 1945) |
| Medal "30 Years of the Victory in Khalkhin-Gol" (Mongolia) |
| Medal "50 Years of the Mongolian People's Revolution" (Mongolia) |
| Medal "30 Years of Victory over Militaristic Japan" (Mongolia) |
| Medal "50 Years of the Mongolian People's Army" (Mongolia) |
| Order of the White Lion, 1st class (Czechoslovakia, 1955) |
| Military Order of the White Lion "For Victory", 1st class (Czechoslovakia, 1945) |
| War Cross 1939–1945 (Czechoslovakia, 1943) |
| Medal "In Commemoration of the Battle of Dukla Pass" (Czechoslovakia, 1960) |
| Order of Karl Marx (East Germany, 1975) |
| Virtuti Militari, 1st class (Poland, 1946) |
| Order of Polonia Restituta, 2nd class (Poland, 1968) |
| Order of Polonia Restituta, 3rd class (Poland, 1973) |
| Cross of Grunwald, 1st class (Poland, 1946) |
| Order of The People's Republic of Bulgaria, 1st class (Bulgaria, 1974) |
| Medal "90th Anniversary of the Birth of Georgi Dimitrov" (Bulgaria, 1972) |
| Grand Officer of the Legion d'Honneur (France, 1944) |
| Croix de guerre (France, 1944) |
| Honorary Knight Grand Cross of the Order of the British Empire (UK, 1943) |
| Chief Commander, Legion of Merit (U.S., 1944) |
| Order of National Liberation (Yugoslavia, 1946) |
| Order of the Partisan Star, 1st class (Yugoslavia, 1946) |
| Order of the National Flag, 1st class (North Korea, 1948) |
| Medal for the Liberation of Korea (North Korea, 1948) |
| Special Grand Cordon of the Order of the Sacred Tripod (Republic of China, 1946) |
| Medal of Sino-Soviet Friendship (China, 1956) |

== Personality and opinions ==
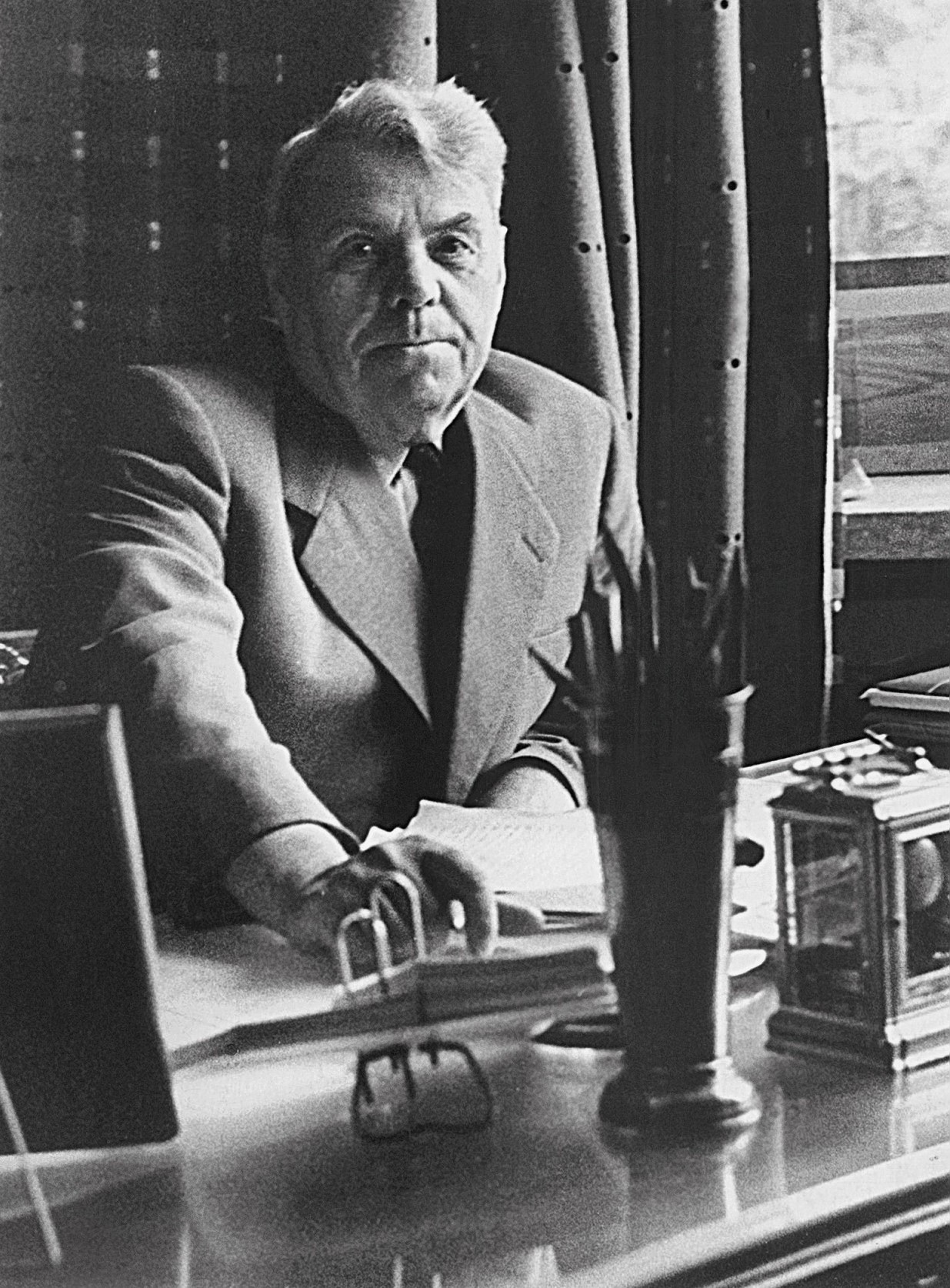
Vasilevsky in 1965

Vasilevsky was regarded by his peers as a kind and soft military commander. General Sergei Shtemenko, a member of the General Staff during the war, described Vasilevsky as a brilliant, yet modest officer with outstanding experience in staff work. Shtemenko pointed out Vasilevsky's prodigious talent for strategic and operational planning. Vasilevsky also showed his respect for subordinates and demonstrated an acute sense of diplomacy and politeness, which Stalin appreciated. As a result, Vasilevsky enjoyed almost unlimited trust from Stalin. Several years before the war, Zhukov described Vasilevsky as "a man who knew his job as he spent a long time commanding a regiment and who earned great respect from everybody." During the war, Zhukov described Vasilevsky as an able commander, enjoying exceptional trust from Stalin, and able to persuade him even during heated discussions. Vasilevsky never mentioned his awards (including the two orders of Victory) in his memoirs, attesting to his modesty. American military historians David M. Glantz and Jonathan M. House wrote that Vasilevsky "exercised a calm, rational influence" on Stalin and was "far less temperamental than Zhukov."

Vasilevsky's actions and personality were sometimes the object of dispute, while less controversial than those of Zhukov. In particular, Nikita Khrushchev defined Vasilevsky in his memoirs as a passive commander completely under the control of Stalin, and blamed him for the Kharkov failure in Spring 1942. Among Vasilevsky's strongest critics was Rokossovsky, who criticized Vasilevsky's decisions during the Stalingrad counteroffensive, especially his refusal to commit the 2nd Army to the annihilation of the encircled German divisions, and for general interference with his own work. Rokossovsky even wrote in his memoirs: "I do not even understand what role could Zhukov and Vasilevsky play on Stalingrad front." In fairness to Vasilevsky it needs noting that he diverted the 2nd army from the assault on the Stalingrad pocket only in order to commit it against a dangerous German counter-attack from Kotelnikovo, designed to deblockade the pocket, which was enjoying great numerical superiority. Vasilevsky, it seems, was dismayed by Rokossovsky's opposition to the transfer.

On the other hand, the writer Victor Suvorov held up Vasilevsky over Zhukov. According to him, Vasilevsky was the only officer responsible for the successful planning and execution of the Soviet counteroffensive at Stalingrad, and Zhukov played no role whatsoever in it. He said that Vasilevsky was the best Soviet military commander and that Soviet victory was mainly due to his actions as the Chief of Staff. According to Suvorov, Zhukov and the Soviet propaganda machine tried, after the war, to reduce the role of the General Staff (and thus Vasilevsky's importance) and to increase the role of the Party and Zhukov.

A post-1991 view on Vasilevsky was elaborated by Mezhiritzky in his book, Reading Marshal Zhukov. Mezhiritzky points out Vasilevsky's timidity and his inability to defend his opinions before Stalin. Reportedly, Vasilevsky was appointed to such high military positions because he was easy to manage. However, Mezhiritzky recognizes Vasilevsky's intelligence and assumes that Vasilevsky was indeed the main author of the Stalingrad counteroffensive. He also points out that Vasilevsky and Zhukov probably deliberately under-reported the estimated strength of the 6th Army to gain Stalin's approval for that risky operation.

== Legacy ==
Gazprom's LNG carrier/floating storage regasification unit is named after Vasilevsky. It was built in 2018 to serve the Arctic Ocean, and delivers gas from Portovaya to Kaliningrad, supplementing the Minsk–Kaliningrad Interconnection.

== Bibliography ==
- Khrushchev, Nikita (1999). Time. People. Power. (Memoirs). Vol. 1. Moscow: IIK Moscow News.
- Otto von Lasch (1991), So fell Königsberg ('So fiel Königsberg'). Moscow.
- Mezhiritzky, P. Ya. (2002). Reading Marshal Zhukov. Philadelphia: Libas Consulting.
- Rokossovsky, K. (1988). Soldier's Duty. Moscow: Politizdat.
- A.P. Shikman (1997), Actors of our History (biographical dictionary). Moscow.
- Shtemenko, S.M. (1989). The General Staff during the War (2nd ed.). Moscow: Voenizdat.
- Viktor Suvorov (2002), Shadow of Victory. Moscow: ACT.
- Vasilevsky, A. M. (1978). The Matter of My Whole Life. Moscow: Politizdat.
- K.A. Zalessky (2000), Stalin's empire (biographical dictionary). Moscow: Veche.
- Zhukov, G. K. (2002). Memoirs. Moscow: Olma-Press.
- (1969–1978) Great Soviet Encyclopedia. Moscow.
- (1976–1979) Soviet Military Encyclopedia. Moscow.

Military offices
| Preceded by Boris Shaposhnikov | Chief of the Staff of the Soviet Army; 26 June 1942 – February 1945 | Succeeded by Aleksei Antonov |
| Preceded by Aleksei Antonov | Chief of the Staff of the Soviet Army; 22 March 1946 – November 1948 | Succeeded by Sergei Shtemenko |
Political offices
| Preceded by Nikolai Bulganin | Minister of War; 24 March 1949 – 15 March 1953 | Succeeded by Nikolai Bulganin |
