= Mozg Armii =

Military theory book by Boris Shaposhnikov

Mozg Armii (Russian: Мозг армии), in English The Brain of the Army, is a three-volume military theory book published between 1927 and 1929. It is the most important work of Boris Shaposhnikov, a Soviet military commander then in command of the Moscow military region. Mozg Armii gained a wide popularity throughout the Red Army, and Shaposhnikov himself was held in high regard by Joseph Stalin.

== The author ==
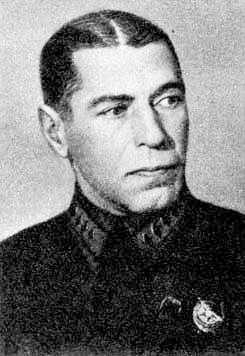
Boris Shaposhnikov

Boris Shaposhnikov had been, before the Russian Revolution, a graduate of the Imperial Nicholas Military Academy (1910) and then a colonel. Unusually for someone with such a background, he supported the revolution and rejoined the Red Army in 1918. As such, when the Red Army was in its early years, he was one of the few officers to have had formal military training. As early as May 1918, he seems to have had an important role in the Soviet Operations Branch, then in its infancy. He was a member of the Red Army General Staff from 1921 to 1925, and also had a role as Joseph Stalin's military mentor.

== Main theories in Mozg Armii ==
=== "Mobilization is the opium of war" ===
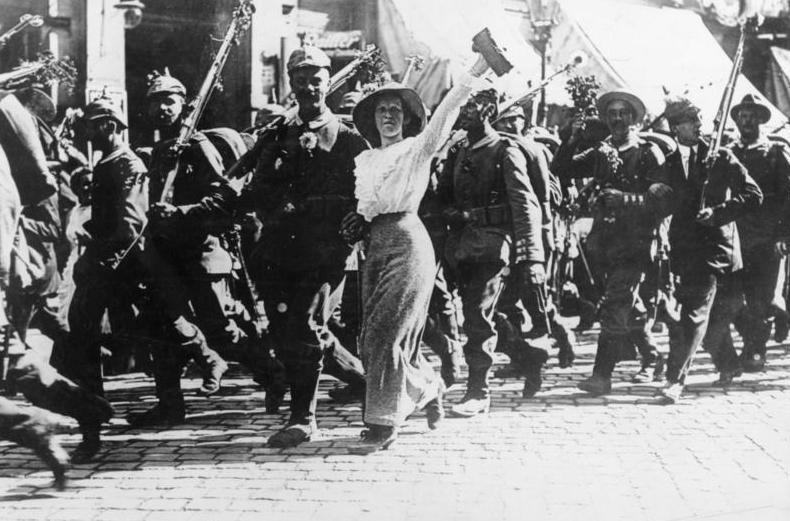
A mobilization scene in Germany on 1 August 1914, the day of the German declaration of war on Russia and two days before Germany declared war on France

"Mobilization is the opium of war" (a paraphrase of Marx) is the title of one of the book's chapters. In it, Shaposhnikov draws mainly from the experience of World War I and the efforts all belligerents made to mobilize as quickly as possible in order first to try and crush the enemy before he himself had been able to mobilize, then to sustain a prolonged war effort. According to Shaposhnikov, the next war would be as long and intense as World War I had been, and would require several mobilizations throughout.

Shaposhnikov also presented mobilization as being a dangerous yet essential measure. On the one hand, he affirmed that governments had to be mindful of the fact that to mobilize was in itself a step towards a full-blown conflict: he underlined the fact that, just before World War I began, mobilization by a country had been tantamount to a declaration of war, as neighbouring countries reacted to such a threat with mobilizations of their own. On the other hand, an early mobilization allowed for reinforcing the lines of defense, whereas delays in mobilization heightened the risk of having to face a fully mobilized enemy army with understrength forces.

In Shaposhnikov's eyes, this and the effort required to sustain a total war, as demonstrated during World War I, pointed to the importance of "pre-mobilization" measures. The drafting of millions of servicemen, and especially, according to Shaposhnikov, the conversion of a country's economy to a war economy, took time and should not be improvised on the go. But, so as not to raise the alarm in neighbouring countries, "pre-mobilization" should, according to Shaposhnikov, consist of as much measures as could be taken to prepare for the actual mobilization, but all the while keeping them secret.

=== The integral military leader: Franz Conrad von Hötzendorf as a model ===
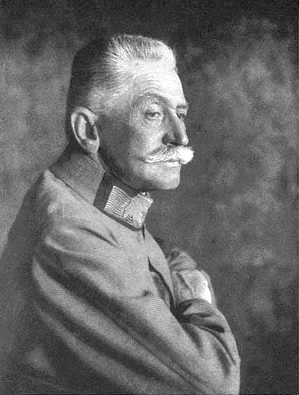
Count Conrad von Hötzendorf, Shaposhnikov's model of a good Chief of the General Staff

Clausewitz also considered a commander in chief to be a military leader without the additional word "supreme"; for us, the chief of the General Staff is considered a strategist and commander in chief who is only part of the leadership in war.

— B. Shaposhnikov, Mozg Armii, vol. 1, p.113.

Regarding military command, Shaposhnikov supported the ideas that one of his colleagues, Alexander Andreyevich Svechin, had already formulated in a book entitled Strategy (first published in 1926). The main idea here was that leadership had to be "integral": it could not be wholly entrusted to any single individual, because, in Svechin's words, the commander in chief "does not have all power over the entire state" and "giving full power to a chosen military leader is an obsolete formula which never reflected any kind of reality". For Svechin, the conduct of a war had to be assumed by the entire state.

For Shaposhnikov, who approved of this and quoted Svechin heavily, the main and ideal model for such an "integral" General Staff was that of the Austro-Hungarian Empire during World War I, and specifically, the staff of Count Franz Conrad von Hötzendorf (the Austro-Hungarian Army's Chief of the General Staff from 1914 to 1916).

According to Shaposhnikov, the cardinal virtue of Conrad was that under him, there was a real teamwork among the General Staff. Shaposhnikov praised Conrad's close relations with his operations chief; he also commended Conrad on his encouraging his subordinates to show initiative, his view of strategy as being subordined to politics (see below), and his willingness to delegate authority.

Shaposhnikov also attributed a range of personal virtues to Conrad, among which "boldness and strength of character", "energy and initiative", "independence", and his workaholism (virtues Shaposhnikov compared to these of Napoleon Bonaparte). However, in line with the Marxist view of history, Shaposhnikov rejected any kind of Great Man theory in warfare and stressed the importance of collective work. For him, this view was supported by Carl von Clausewitz's (see above quote) and Conrad's own writings. Conrad had been badly defeated in 1916 by Russian General Alexei Brusilov, who, like Shaposhnikov, joined the Red Army after the Revolution.

=== Subordination of strategy to politics ===
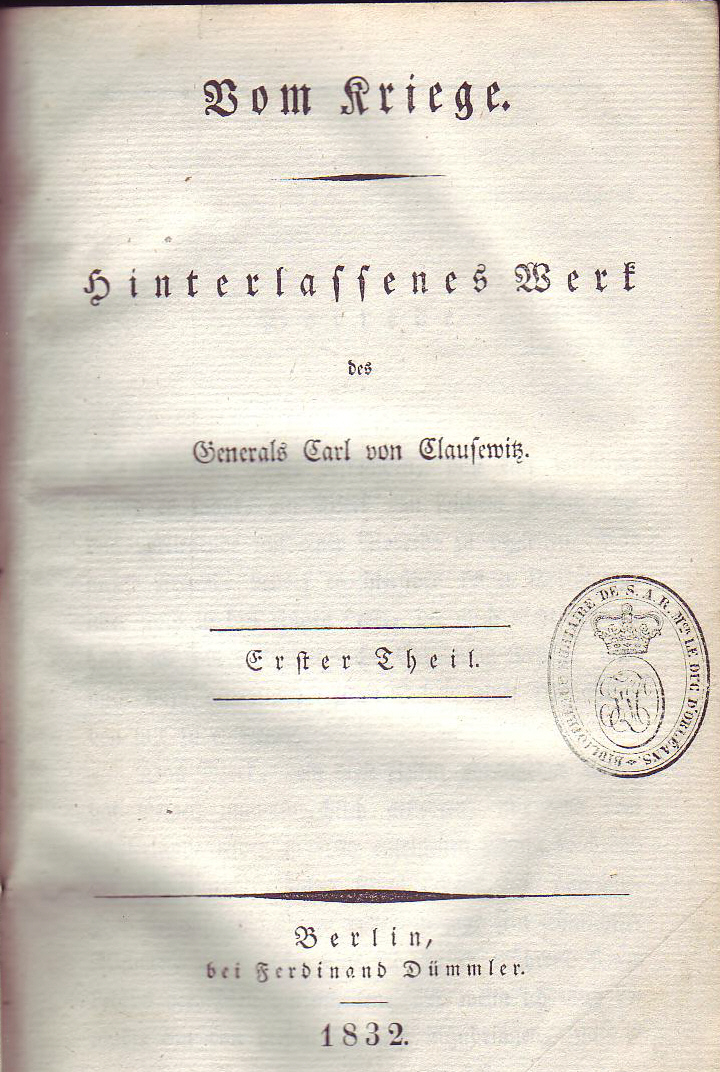
First edition of Clausewitz's On War (1832), an important reference in Mozg Armii

Another central reference to Clausewitz in Mozg Armii is to the famous clausewitzian idea that "war is a continuation of politics by other means". Shaposhnikov approved of this, and stressed that military planning in general, and mobilization in particular (see above), had to be made according to political imperatives.

While he was not at the time a member of the Communist Party of the Soviet Union, Shaposhnikov was, in Mozg Armii, in favour of a politically engaged General Staff, acting as directed by the Party. In his definition of "politics" as pertaining to the conduct of war, Shaposhnikov included the idea of class struggle – both at a worldwide and at a national scale (within each belligerent country).

Conrad von Hötzendorf, the main role model in Mozg Armii (see above), was also described as a politically savvy general by Shaposhnikov, and specifically, as one whose ideas were quite in accordance with these of Marxism. For instance, he noted that Conrad favoured the equality of all nationalities within the armed forces, without discriminations. Shaposhnikov even went so far as to say that Conrad was in favour of a mass "People's Army", which was in contradiction with Conrad's own writings.

== Reception and influence ==
In contrast with Alexander Andreyevich Svechin's Strategy, one of Shaposhnikov's inspirations and references (see above), Mozg Armii was very well received and had a lasting influence. Mozg Armii was quoted as an important text by nearly all Soviet military theorists and military historians; as late as the 1990s, it was still included as a textbook in the curriculum of the General Staff Academy. Thus, Mozg Armii can be seen as a landmark in Soviet military theory and doctrine on the organization of the Red Army's General Staff.
