= Olga Lepeshinskaya (dancer) =

Soviet ballerina (1916–2008)

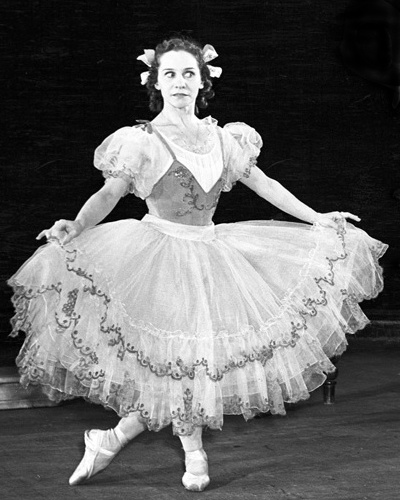
- Lepeshinskaya as Swanilda, Coppélia, 1957
- Born: Olga Vasilyevna Lepeshinskaya; 28 September 1916; Kyiv, Russian Empire
- Died: 20 December 2008 (aged 92); Moscow, Russia
- Education: Moscow State Academy of Choreography
- Occupations: Prima ballerina, teacher
- Years active: 1935–2008
- Spouse: Leonid Raykhman Aleksei Antonov (m. 1956; died 1962)
- Awards: Order of Lenin (1971); Order of the Badge of Honour (1936)

Olga Vasilyevna Lepeshinskaya (Russian: Ольга Васильевна Лепешинская; 28 September [O.S. 15 September] 1916 – 20 December 2008) was a Soviet ballerina. She was named a People's Artist of the USSR in 1951.

== Childhood ==
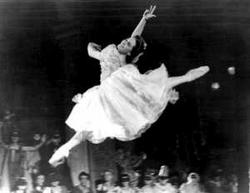
Lepeshinskaya as Kitry in Don Quixote in 1940

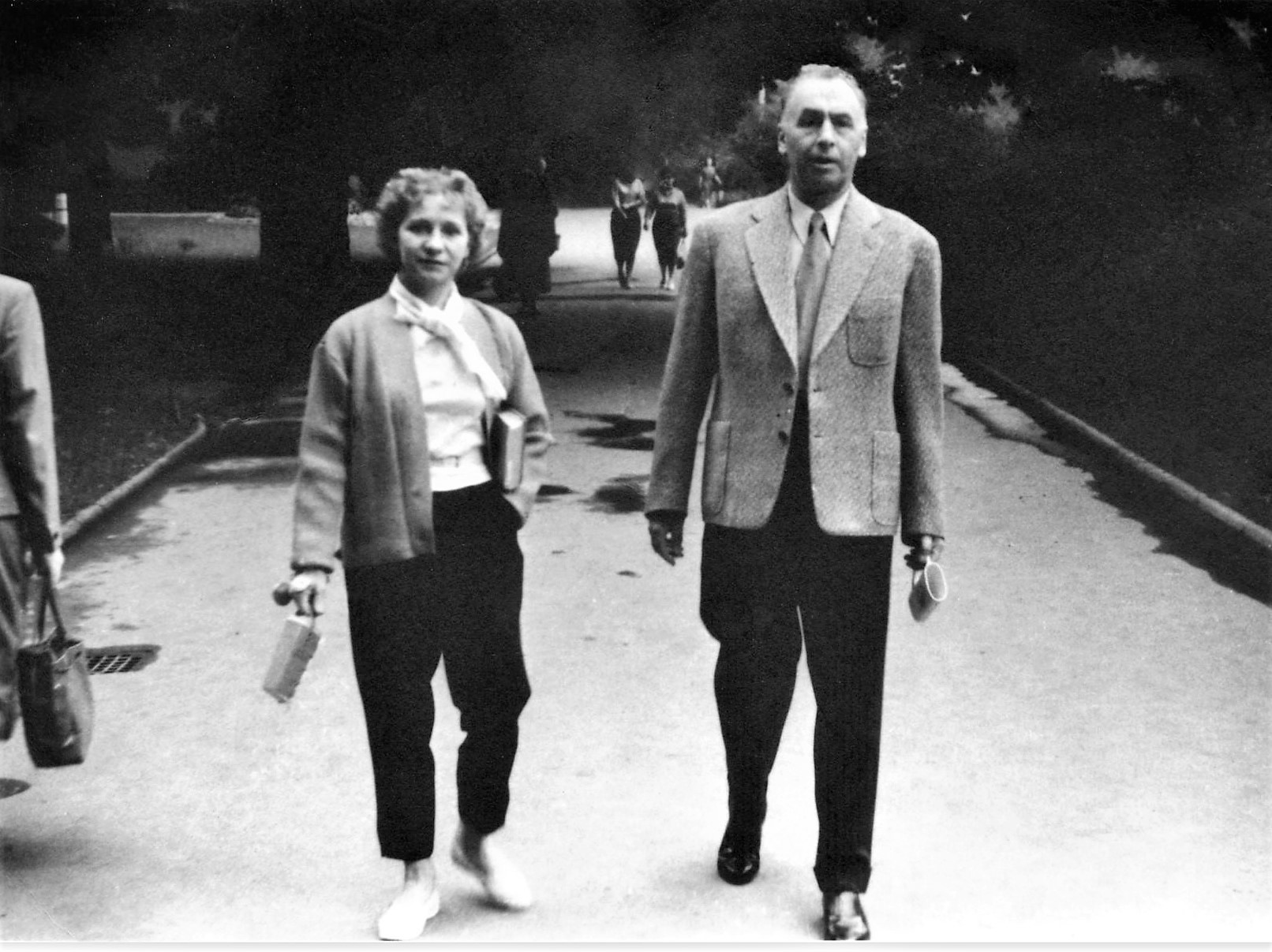
Lepeshinskaya with Aleksei Antonov in 1960

Lepeshinskaya was born to an old Polish noble family in Kyiv, Russian Empire (now the capital of Ukraine). Her grandfather, Vasily Pavlovich Lepeshinsky, was arrested as a member of the revolutionary organization Narodnaya Volya. Her father, Vasily Vasilyevich Lepeshinsky, was a railway engineer, one of the builders of the Chinese Eastern Railway.

From the early years Lepeshinskaya showed her talents in dancing and in the 1925 she was admitted to the Bolshoi Choreographic School. She appeared for the first time on the stage of the Bolshoi Theatre at the age of ten as one of the little birds in the ballet The Daughter of the Snows. In 1932, she played the Sugar Plum Fairy in The Nutcracker ballet.

== Prima ballerina ==
Lepeshinskaya graduated from Bolshoi Choreographic School and started working the Bolshoi Theatre. She started as Rosina in a ballet of The Barber of Seville (Тщетная предосторожность) performed by the second stage of the theater. In 1935, she performed the main role in the Three Fat Men ballet by Yury Olesha. The ballet became very popular and the 18-year-old ballerina became famous.

Lepeshinskaya performed in private concerts at the Moscow Kremlin from the age of 17. She was very close to Polina Zhemchuzhina, wife of Vyacheslav Molotov. It was a great shock for her when Zhemchuzhina was imprisoned in a Gulag. Lepeshinskaya was known as the favourite ballerina of Joseph Stalin and even rumoured to be his mistress. In 1943, she became a member of the Communist Party.

Lepeshinskaya married a Soviet intelligence MGB general Leonid Raykhman (known as the handler of Nikolai Kuznetsov). He was arrested on 19 October 1951 as an alleged participant in the fabricated Zionist Plot in MGB. Lepeshinskaya claimed that her appeals to Stalin saved the life of her husband. In March 1953, after Stalin's death, Raykhman was freed, rehabilitated and appointed the head of MVD Control Commission. In August 1953, he was arrested again that time for his own fabrications of criminal cases, tortures of prison inmates and other violations of the "Socialist Law". He was sentenced to five years in prison in August 1956 but amnestied in November 1956. After that, he did research work in astronomy.

In February 1940, the Kirov Ballet in Leningrad first performed their Don Quixote ballet with Lepeshinskaya as Kitry. The ballet was a great success. In 1941, when the Stalin Prize was established, Lepeshinskaya was among the first laureates of the prize for her performance in Don Quixote. Altogether Lepesinskaya received four Stalin Prizes.

With the beginning of the Great Patriotic War Lepeshinskaya became a member of the Front brigade of the Bolshoi Theater. The brigade performed near the front lines, in hospitals, in Moscow and in Saratov where the Bolshoi was evacuated. Lepeshinskaya was a member of the brigade until the end of World War II. Her performances near the battlefields were filmed in the 1941 Soviet Documentary Kontsert – Frontu (Concerto to the Front).

In 1942, the Soviet Youth Anti-Fascist Committee was organized. Lepeshinskaya was its Deputy chairperson.

In 1943, she starred as Assol in the Bolshoi premiere of Scarlet Sails. On 9 May, she was with her Bolshoi brigade with Soviet troops in Warsaw. The next day she received her invitation to perform in the Bolshoi's production of Cinderella. The ballet, first performed on 21 November 1945, was the first post-war show at the Bolshoi. Lepeshinskaya won her second Stalin prize for her performance. She received her third Stalin prize for her performance in the Flames of Paris and the fourth prize for the Tao-Hoa role in The Red Poppy. In 1951, she received the People's Artist of the USSR title along with Galina Ulanova.

== Teacher ==
She married Soviet General Aleksei Antonov in 1956. In 1962, her husband died. The nervous shock was so strong that she became temporarily blind. When her vision returned, after a year of treatment, she found herself unneeded by the Bolshoi Theater or the Bolshoi School. Fortunately, she found a place at the Komische Oper Berlin where she worked as a ballet mistress for ten years.

After this, she worked as a trainer in many different companies throughout the world. For thirty years, she served as the Chairperson of Ballet competitions in Moscow. She was the president of the Russian Choreographic Association (from 1992) and was the Chairperson for the Choreography Entrance Exams at the Russian Academy of Theatre Arts (for her last fifty years).

She helped painter Ilya Glazunov during his early career (she was reprimanded for organizing his first exhibition), so he declared Lepeshinskaya to be his godmother in the art.

Lepeshinskaya died of a heart attack on 20 December 2008 in Moscow at the age of 92.

== Honours and awards ==
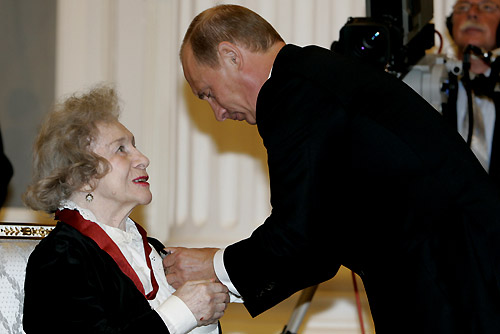
President Vladimir Putin awarded of Order "For Merit to the Fatherland", 2nd class to Olga Lepeshinskaya on 6 October 2006

- Order "For Merit to the Fatherland";
  - 2nd class (28 September 2006) – for outstanding contributions to the development of national choreography and many years of fruitful work
  - 3rd class (12 September 1996) – for outstanding contribution to the development of national culture
- Order of Lenin (1971)
- Order of the October Revolution (1986)
- Order of the Red Banner of Labour, twice (1951, 1966)
- Order of the Badge of Honour (1937)
- Medal "For the Defence of Moscow"
- Medal "For Valiant Labour in the Great Patriotic War 1941–1945"
- People's Artist of the USSR (1951)
- People's Artist of the RSFSR (1947)
- Honored Artist of the RSFSR (1942)
- Stalin Prizes;
  - 1st degree (1941) – for outstanding achievements in the field of ballet
  - 1st degree (1946) – for performing the title roles in the ballet "Cinderella" by Prokofiev
  - 1st degree (1947) – for her performance as Joan in the ballet "Flames of Paris" Asafiev
  - 2nd degree (1950) – for her performance as Tao Hoa in the ballet "The Red Poppy" by R. Glier
- Gratitude of the President of Russia (2005)
- Medal "Veteran of Labour"
- Award of the World Youth Festival in Prague (1947)
- Prize "Soul Dance" magazine "Ballet" in the "Maestro of Dance" (2000)
- Jubilee Medal "In Commemoration of the 100th Anniversary of the Birth of Vladimir Ilyich Lenin"
- Order of the Banner, with diamonds (Hungary)

== See also ==
- List of Russian ballet dancers
