= Far East Command =

The Far East Command was a military regional division of the British military, the United States military, and the Soviet Armed Forces

- British Far East Command
- Far East Command (United States), a United States military command (1947–57)
- Far East Command (Soviet Union), a command created in 1945 specifically for the Soviet invasion of Manchuria. Not to be confused with the Far Eastern Military District

== See also ==
- American-British-Dutch-Australian Command (ABDACOM)
- South East Asia Command (SEAC)
