= Aleksei Antonov =

Soviet general (1896–1962)

- Алексей Антонов
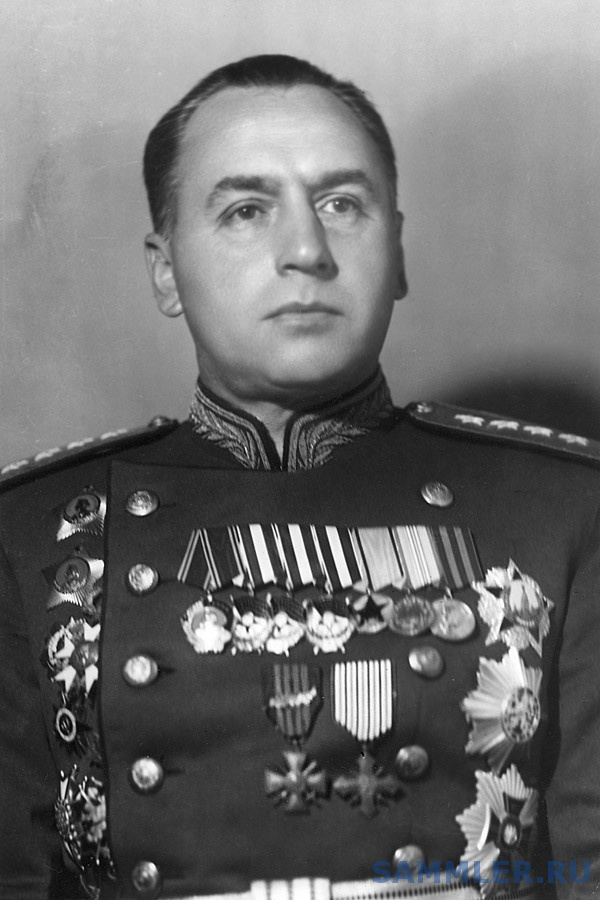
- Army general Aleksei Antonov.

Personal details
- Born: 9 September 1896 Grodno, Russian Empire
- Died: 16 June 1962 (aged 65) Moscow, Russian SFSR, Soviet Union
- Resting place: Kremlin Wall Necropolis, Moscow
- Spouse: Olga Lepeshinskaya (m. 1956)
- Occupation: Chief of Staff of the Combined Forces of the Warsaw Pact
- Awards: Order of Victory

Military service
- Allegiance: Soviet Russia (1921–1922); Soviet Union (1922–1962)
- Branch/service: Soviet Army
- Years of service: 1921–1962
- Rank: Army General
- Commands: Transcaucasus Military District
- Battles/wars: Russian Civil War; World War II; Cold War

Aleksei Innokentievich Antonov (Russian: Алексей Иннокентьевич Антонов; 9 September 1896 – 16 June 1962) was a General of the Soviet Army, awarded the Order of Victory for his efforts in World War II. From 1945 to 1946 he was Chief of the General Staff of the Armed Forces of the Soviet Union.

== Career ==
Born in Grodno in a family of Kryashen ethnicity as the son of an artillery officer of the Imperial Russian Army, Antonov graduated from Frunze Military Academy in 1921 and joined the Red Army during the Russian Civil War. He became an instructor at Frunze Military Academy in 1938.

In 1941, Antonov became chief of staff for the Soviet Southwestern Front and Southern Front. In December 1942, he became Deputy Chief General Staff of the combined Soviet forces and Head of the Operations Directorate, a pivotal role within the Stavka. In fact, A. I. Antonov was effective leader of the Soviet General Staff since chief of staff A. M. Vasilevsky was usually absent due to his frequent frontline missions as Stavka representative. As a result, Stavka relieved Antonov of his position in Operational Directorate, so that Antonov could fully concentrate on the leadership in the General Staff. In February 1945, Vasilevsky was appointed as the commander of 3rd Belarusian Front, and Antonov finally became the formal leader of Soviet General Staff. In spite of his key role in the Red Army's ultimate victory, he was never named a Marshal of the Soviet Union.

Richard Overy writes of him at this time:

Vasilevsky came to rely on one subordinate above all others: the chief of operations, General Aleksei Antonov. [...] On December 11 [1942] the forty-six-year-old Antonov stepped into the role which was more directly exposed to Stalin's inquisitive leadership than any other. Antonov rose to the challenge. Instead of rushing off to report to Stalin when he arrived in Moscow, he spent the first week familiarizing himself thoroughly with the General Staff and the state of the front. Only when he was fully primed did he go to see his commander. The two men developed the most effective working relationship of the war. Antonov displayed a calm intelligence married to a massive energy and exceptional industry. According to his deputy, General Sergei Shtemenko, Antonov never lost his temper or allowed circumstances to get the better of him. He was firm, caustic, slow to praise and a tough taskmaster, but the rigorous regimen that he imposed on his staff won their respect. Above all he was adept at manipulating Stalin. He did not sugar-coat his reports. He was prepared to stand up to Stalin with what his deputy regarded as a 'brave outspokenness'. So skilled was he at providing the evening situation reports concisely and accurately that even Zhukov bowed to his capability and allowed Antonov to present them in his place. The trust that Stalin came to place in Antonov was reflected in his survivability. He retained his office until February 1945, when he was made chief of staff in Vasilevsky's place.

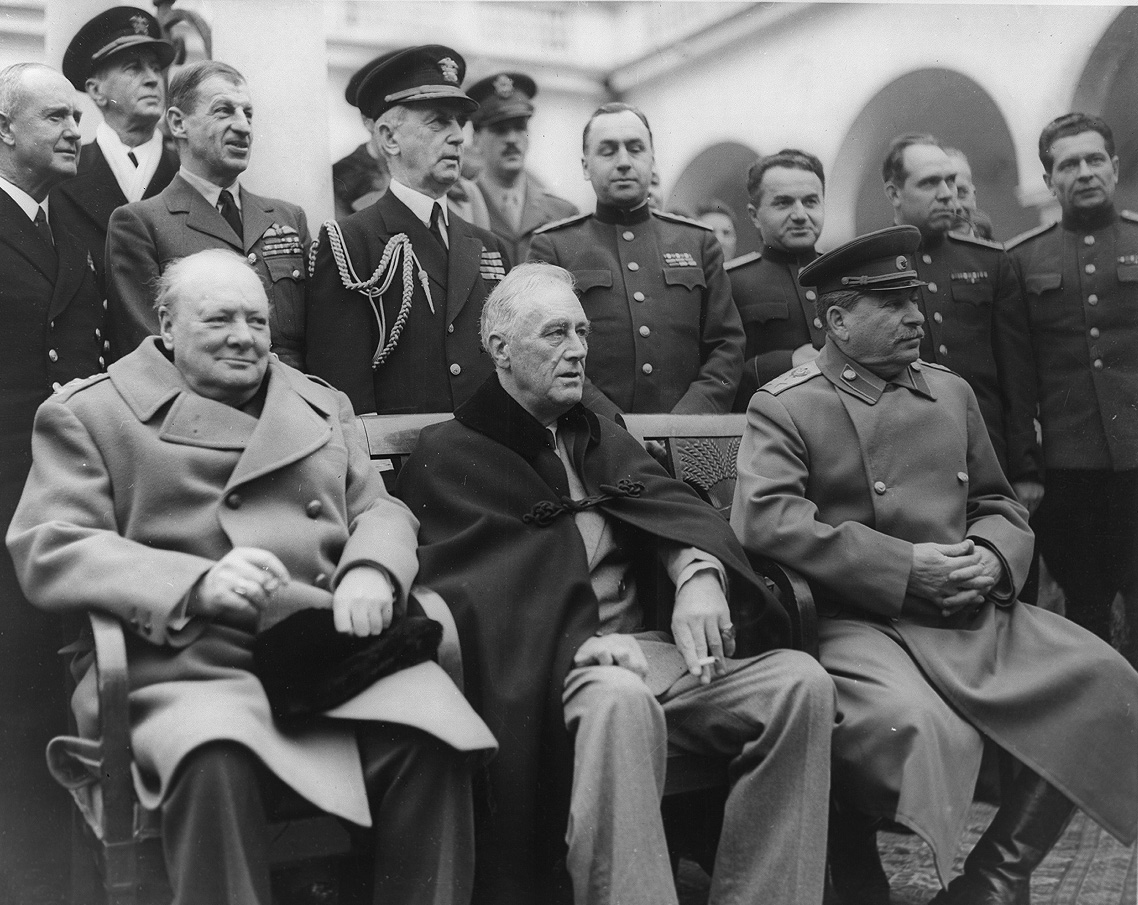
Antonov standing behind Stalin at the Yalta Conference, 9 February 1945.

By 1944, Antonov was Chief Spokesman and was present at the Moscow, Yalta and Potsdam Conferences. At the Yalta Conference, he briefed the Western Allies on coordinating military actions, and by stressing how the Allies could aid Soviets through bombing lines of communications contributed to the Dresden raid.

After the war, Antonov became Deputy Commander-in-Chief and then Commander-in-Chief of the Transcaucasus Military District. In 1955, he became Chief of Staff of the Combined Forces of the Warsaw Pact. He held this post until his death in 1962.

Antonov died on 16 June 1962 in Moscow, and his ashes were interred in the Kremlin Wall Necropolis.

== Family ==
In 1956, Antonov married ballerina Olga Lepeshinskaya. It was his second marriage.

== Sources ==
- Bonn, Keith E. (2005). Slaughterhouse: Handbook of the Eastern Front. Aberjona Press.
- S. M. Shtemenko. The Soviet General Staff. Progress Publisher, Moskva.

Military offices
Preceded by Aleksandr Vasilevsky	Chief of the Staff of the Red Army; 1945–1946	Succeeded by Aleksandr Vasilevsky
