= Boris Shaposhnikov =

Soviet marshal (1882–1945)

- Russian: Бори́с Ша́пошников
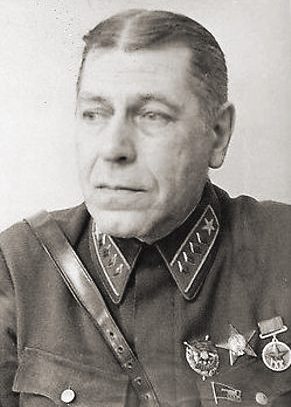
- Shaposhnikov c. 1940
- Born: Boris Mikhailovitch Shaposhnikov; 2 October 1882; Zlatoust, Ufa Governorate; Russian Empire
- Died: 26 March 1945 (aged 62); Moscow, Soviet Union
- Burial place: Kremlin Wall Necropolis
- Military career
- Allegiance: Russian Empire (1901–1917); Soviet Russia (1917–1922); Soviet Union (1922–1945)
- Service years: 1901–1945
- Rank: Colonel (Imperial Army); Marshal of the Soviet Union (Red Army)
- Commands: Leningrad Military District; Moscow Military District; Chief of the General Staff; Volga Military District
- Conflicts: Russo-Japanese War; World War I Russian Civil War; World War II
- Other work: Mozg Armii (The Brain of the Army), 1929

Boris Mikhaylovich Shaposhnikov (Russian: Бори́с Миха́йлович Ша́пошников) (2 October [O.S. 20 September] 1882 – 26 March 1945) was a Soviet military officer, theoretician and Marshal of the Soviet Union. He served as the Chief of the General Staff of the Soviet Armed Forces from 1928 to 1931 and at the start of the Second World War. Shaposhnikov was one of the foremost military theorists during the Stalin-era. His most important work, Mozg Armii ("The Brain of the Army"), is considered a landmark in Soviet military theory and doctrine on the organization of the Red Army's General Staff.

Born to a family of Orenburg Cossack origins in Zlatoust in the Urals, Shaposhnikov was a graduate of the Nicholas General Staff Academy and served in the Imperial Russian Army, reaching the rank of colonel during the First World War. He supported the Russian Revolution and later joined the Red Army, but did not become a member of the Communist Party until 1939. He was Chief of the Staff of the Red Army from 1928 to 1931, followed by a stint as commandant of the Frunze Military Academy. In 1937, he was appointed to the newly created title of Chief of the General Staff. In 1940, he was named a Marshal of the Soviet Union.

Shaposhnikov resigned as Chief of the General Staff following Soviet failures during the Winter War in Finland. He was reappointed to the position following the Axis invasion of the Soviet Union in 1941, replacing Georgy Zhukov, but was again forced to resign a year later due to declining health. He then held the post of commandant of the Academy of the General Staff, and remained an influential and respected advisor to Stalin until his death in 1945.

== Biography ==
Shaposhnikov, born at Zlatoust, near Chelyabinsk in the Ural Mountains, had Orenburg Cossack origins. He joined the army of the Russian Empire in 1901 as an officer cadet, and graduated from the Nicholas General Staff Academy in 1910, reaching the rank of colonel in the Caucasus Grenadiers division in September 1917 during World War I. Also in 1917, unusually for an officer of his rank, he supported the Russian Revolution, and in May 1918 joined the Red Army.

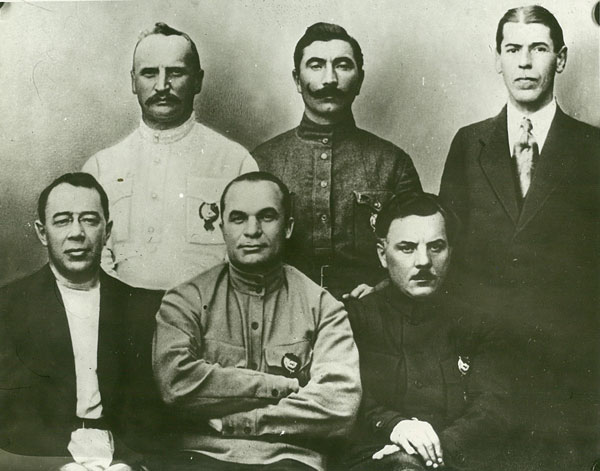
Shaposhnikov (top right) with other prominent Soviet military commanders, including three future Marshals of the Soviet Union, 1921

Shaposhnikov was one of the few Red Army commanders with formal pre-revolutionary military training, and in 1921 he became 1st Deputy Chief of Staff of the Army's General Staff, where he served until 1925. He was appointed commander of the Leningrad Military District in 1925 and then of the Moscow Military District in 1927. From 1928 to 1931 he served as Chief of the Staff of the Red Army, replacing Mikhail Tukhachevsky, with whom he had a strained relationship. He was then demoted to command of the Volga Military District from April 1931 to 1932 as a result of slanderous accusations (made by an arrested staff-officer) of belonging to a clandestine organization. In 1932 he was appointed commandant of the Red Army's Frunze Military Academy, then in 1935 he returned to the command of the Leningrad region. In 1937, he was appointed as Chief of the General Staff, in succession to Alexander Ilyich Yegorov, a defendant of the Case of Trotskyist Anti-Soviet Military Organization secret trial during Joseph Stalin's Great Purge of the Red Army. In May 1940 he was appointed a Marshal of the Soviet Union.

Despite his background as a Tsarist officer, Shaposhnikov won the respect and trust of Stalin. Due to his status as a professional officer, he did not join the Communist Party until 1939. This may have helped him avoid Stalin's suspicions. The price he paid for his survival during the purges was collaboration in the destruction of Tukhachevsky and of many other colleagues. Stalin showed his admiration for the officer by always keeping a copy of Shaposhnikov's most important work, Mozg Armii (Мозг армии, "The Brain of the Army") (1929), on his desk. Shaposhnikov was one of the few men whom Stalin addressed by his Christian name and patronymic. Mozg Armii has remained on the curriculum of the General Staff Academy since its publication in 1929.

Fortunately for the Soviet Union, Shaposhnikov had a fine military mind and high administrative skills. He combined these talents with his position in Stalin's confidence to rebuild the Red Army's leadership cadres after the purges. He obtained the release from the Gulag of 4,000 officers deemed necessary for this operation. In 1939 Stalin accepted Shaposhnikov's plan for a rapid buildup of the Red Army's strength. Although the planned changes remained incomplete at the time of the Axis invasion of June 1941, they had advanced sufficiently to save the Soviet Union from complete disaster.

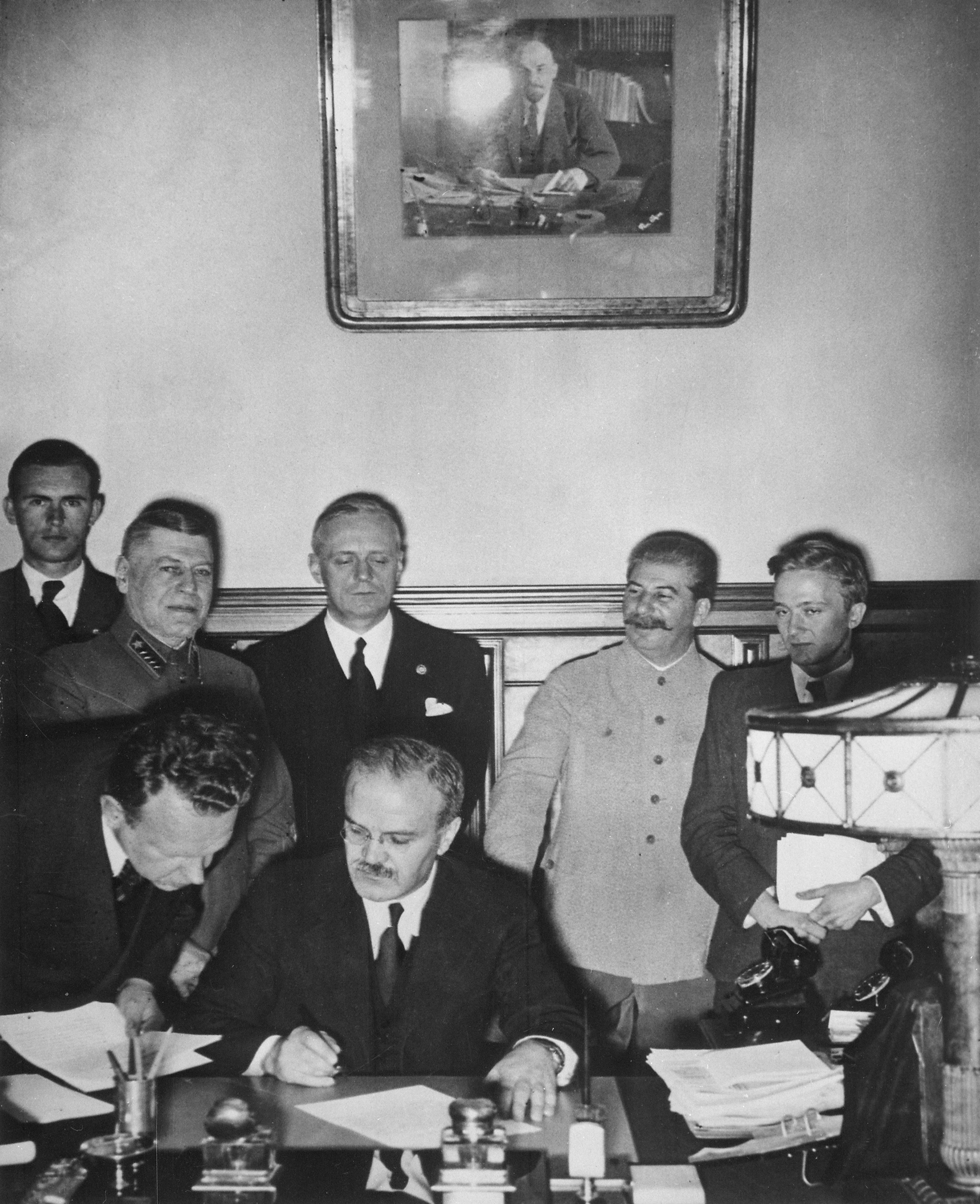
Shaposhnikov with Stalin, Ribbentrop and Molotov at the signing of German–Soviet Frontier Treaty on 28 September 1939

Shaposhnikov planned the 1939 Soviet invasion of Finland, but was much less optimistic about its duration than Stalin and the campaign's commander Kliment Voroshilov. The resultant Winter War (1939–1940) did not deliver the immediate success the Soviet side had hoped for, and Shaposhnikov resigned as Chief of the General Staff in August 1940, due to ill-health and to disagreements with Stalin about the conduct of that campaign. Following the Axis invasion of the Soviet Union on 22 June 1941, he was reinstated (29 July 1941) as Chief of the General Staff to succeed Georgy Zhukov, and also became Deputy People's Commissar for Defence, the post he held until his career was cut short by ill-health in 1943. He resigned again as Chief of the General Staff due to ill-health on 10 May 1942. He held the position of commandant of the Voroshilov Military Academy until his death in 1945 at the age of 62. Shaposhnikov had groomed his successor as Chief of Staff, Aleksandr Vasilevsky, and remained an influential and respected advisor to Stalin until his death. His ashes were buried in the Kremlin Wall Necropolis.

== Honours and awards ==
Russian Empire

- Order of St. Anna, 4th class (26 October 1914), 3rd class with Swords and Bow (1915), 2nd class with Swords (1 November 1916)
- Order of St. Vladimir, 4th class with Swords and Bow (2 November 1914)
- Order of Saint Stanislaus, 3rd class with Swords and Bow (22 July 1916)

Soviet Union

- Three Orders of Lenin (31 December 1939, 3 October 1942, 21 February 1945)
- Order of the Red Banner, twice (14 October 1921, 3 November 1944)
- Order of Suvorov, 1st class (22 February 1944)
- Order of the Red Star, twice (15 January 1934, 22 February 1938)
- Jubilee Medal "XX Years of the Workers' and Peasants' Red Army" (22 February 1938)
- Medal "For the Defence of Moscow" (1 May 1944)

== See also ==
- Russian destroyer Marshal Shaposhnikov (BPK 543)

Military offices
Preceded by Mikhail Tukhachevsky	Chief of the Staff of the Red Army; May 1928 – April 1931	Succeeded by Vladimir Triandafillov
Preceded by Alexander Yegorov	Chief of the Staff of the Red Army; 10 May 1937 – August 1940	Succeeded by Kirill Meretskov
Preceded by Georgy Zhukov	Chief of the Staff of the Red Army; 29 July 1941 – 11 May 1942	Succeeded by Aleksandr Vasilevsky
