= Guards Army (Russia) =

Soviet-era military guard organization

- Guard Badge, Soviet Union
- Country: Soviet Union
- Allegiance: Armed Forces of the Soviet Union
- Branch: Workers' and Peasants' Red Army
- Type: Guards operational formation
- Engagements: Great Patriotic War

The Guards Army was a guards operational formation (association, army) of the Workers' and Peasants' Red Army of the Armed Forces of the Soviet Union during the Great Patriotic War and in the postwar period. Guards Armies are also currently in the Russian Armed Forces.

Guards Armies appeared in the Armed Forces of the Soviet Union, when for the displayed heroism, courage and high combat skill by the personnel of the formations (such as the army and the tank army), they were awarded honorary titles – the guards.

== History ==
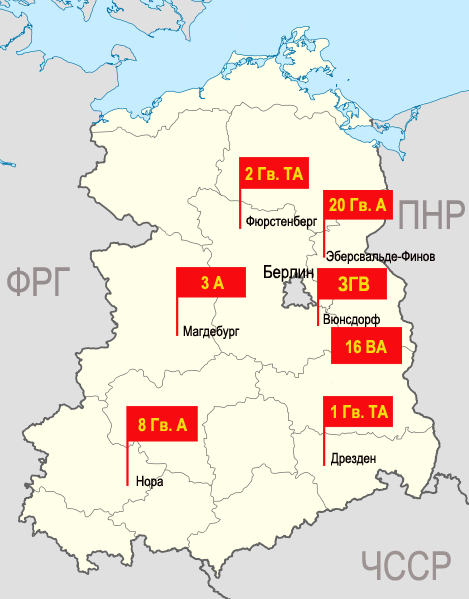
Symbols of the armies of the Western Group of Forces on the diagram of the territory of the German Democratic Republic, as of 1991

As an operational formation, the "army" first emerged at the beginning of the 19th century. The emergence of armies was caused by an increase in the size of the armed forces of the state, the development of weapons and military equipment, communications and the increased spatial scope of military operations. In these conditions, to increase the efficiency of command and control, to better use the combat and maneuverable capabilities of the troops, it was necessary to divide the armed forces operating in the theater of operations into armies, and the Russians were the first to do this. From 1806 to the 60s of the 19th century, the Russian Imperial Army included corps (the highest formations in the infantry and cavalry are non–permanent), which had two divisions (a permanent military formation consisting of two or three brigades of two-regiment composition and an artillery brigade) and artillery brigades (corps).

There were guards formations in the Russian Imperial Army, the largest of which is the 1st Guards Corps. After the October Revolution, they were all disbanded.

During the Great Patriotic War, for the heroism, courage and high military skill of the personnel shown in the defense of the Fatherland from the attacking enemy, the assignment of honorary titles to the formations of the Workers' and Peasants' Red Army began – the guards. Upon receipt of its formation, it was renamed, they were assigned new military numbers. Accordingly, as the number of guards formations increased, guards corps and armies appeared. Guards Armies were formed from guards formations and units.

During operations, the Guards Armies were used in the most critical sectors and directions, since they had an increased combat ability in the offensive and special staunchness in defense.

In total, during the Great Patriotic War, 11 armies and 6 tank armies were awarded the honorary title of the Guards.

During the period of Khrushchev's reductions, Guards Mechanized Armies appeared in the Armed Forces of the Soviet Union, and later returned to the Guards Tank Armies.

== Structure ==
The composition of the Guards Army, depending on the type of troops, included:

- Management (headquarters);
- Formations (corps, divisions);
- Units (brigades, regiments, separate battalions, divizions and companies);
- Institutions (hospitals, bases, warehouses).

== Banner ==
Each Guards Army was awarded a Guards Red Banner in accordance with the Regulations on the Red Banners of the Guards Army and the Guards Corps:

1. The Guards Red Banner is awarded to armies and corps when they are given a guards name. The Guards Red Banner obliges all personnel of the Guards armies and corps to be a model for all other units and formations of the Red Army.
2. The Guards Red Banner is presented on behalf of the Presidium of the Supreme Soviet of the Soviet Union by a representative of the People's Commissariat of Defense of the Soviet Union.
3. The Guards Red Banner is retained by the Guards Army and the Guards Corps for the entire time, regardless of the change in the name and numbering of the army or corps. Changes in the name and numbering of the army or corps are recorded in the certificate issued upon delivery of the Red Banner.
4. The Red Banner of the Guards Army or the Guards Corps is always located with the army headquarters or the corps headquarters.
5. If the Guards Banner is lost due to disorganization, cowardice and instability in battle, the commanding staff guilty of such a shame is subject to a military tribunal, and the army or corps are deprived of their guards rank and are subject to reorganization.

— Regulations on the Red Banners of the Guards Army and the Guards Corps

== Formations ==
- 1st Guards Army;
- 2nd Guards Army;
- 3rd Guards Army;
- 4th Guards Army;
- 5th Guards Army;
- 6th Guards Army;
- 7th Guards Army;
- 8th Guards Army;
- 9th Guards Army;
- 10th Guards Army;
- 11th Guards Army;
- 20th Guards Army;
- 1st Guards Tank Army;
- 2nd Guards Tank Army;
- 3rd Guards Tank Army;
- 4th Guards Tank Army;
- 5th Guards Tank Army;
- 6th Guards Tank Army;
- 1st Guards Mechanized Army;
- 2nd Guards Mechanized Army;
- 3rd Guards Mechanized Army;
- 4th Guards Mechanized Army;
- 5th Guards Mechanized Army;
- 6th Guards Mechanized Army;
- 33rd Guards Missile Army.

== See also ==
- Separate Missile Attack Warning Army

== Sources ==
- Great Soviet Encyclopedia, Third Edition, Published by the Publishing House "Soviet Encyclopedia" in 1969–1978 in 30 Volumes
- A – Bureau of Military Commissars / Edited by Andrey Grechko – Moscow: Military Publishing House of the Ministry of Defense of the Soviet Union, 1976 – 637 Pages – (Soviet Military Encyclopedia: in 8 Volumes; 1976–1980, Volume 1)
- Soviet Armed Forces – 60 Years Old (Accompanying Text, Part Two) / N. I. Kobrin, B. P. Frolov – Moscow: Knowledge, 1978 – 32 Pages
- Soviet Armed Forces. Construction History – Moscow: Military Publishing House of the Ministry of Defense of the Soviet Union, 1978
- Military Encyclopedic Dictionary, Moscow, Military Publishing House of the Ministry of Defense of the Soviet Union, 1984, 863 Pages With Illustrations, 30 Sheets
- Guards Army // Great Patriotic War, 1941–1945: Encyclopedia / Edited by Mikhail Kozlov – Moscow: Soviet Encyclopedia, 1985 – Page 501 – 500,000 Copies
- Dictionary of Military Terms / Compiled by Anatoly Plekhov, S. G. Shapkin – Moscow: Military Publishing House of the Ministry of Defense of the Soviet Union, 1988
- A. Kryukovskikh. Dictionary of Historical Terms – 1998;
- Vadim Zolotarev; V. V. Marushchenko; Sergey Avtyushin, eds. (1999). In the Name of Russia: the Russian State, the Army and Military Education. p. 336. ISBN 5-86273-020-6.
- Big Encyclopedic Dictionary, 2000
- Andrey Lensky, Mikhail Tsybin. "Soviet Ground Forces in the Last Year of the Soviet Union. Directory" – Saint Petersburg, 2001
- Vitaly Feskov, Konstantin Kalashnikov, Valery Golikov. Soviet Army During the Cold War (1945–1991) – Tomsk: Tomsk University Publishing House, 2004 – 236 Pages
- 60 Years of the Great Victory
- Soviet Tank Troops, 1941–1945
