= Nikandr Chibisov =

Soviet military commander (1892–1959)

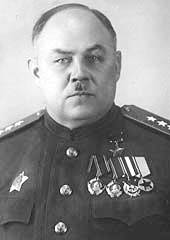
- Born: 5 November 1892; Romanovskaya, Don Host Oblast, Russian Empire
- Died: 20 September 1959 (aged 66); Minsk, Belarusian SSR, Soviet Union
- Military career
- Allegiance: Russian Empire (1913–1918) RSFSR (1918–1922) Soviet Union (from 1922)
- Branch: Imperial Russian Army (1913–1918); Red Army/Soviet Army (1918–1954)
- Service years: 1913–1954
- Rank: Colonel general
- Commands: 4th Rifle Corps; Odessa Military District; Separate Coastal Army; Bryansk Front; 38th Army; 3rd Shock Army; 1st Shock Army; Frunze Military Academy
- Awards: Hero of the Soviet Union

Nikandr Yevlampievich Chibisov (Russian: Никандр Евлампиевич Чибисов; 17 November (O.S. 5 November) 1892 – 20 September 1959) was a Soviet Army colonel general and Hero of the Soviet Union (1943).

== Early life and World War I ==
Nikandr Yevlampievich Chibisov was born on 17 November 1892 in the stanitsa of Romanovskaya, Don Host Oblast. His name was listed as Chibizov in Imperial army records and his social status as petty bourgeois from Tsaritsynsky Uyezd of Saratov Governorate, but in his Red Army records the spelling of his name was changed to Chibisov and his social origin recorded as working class. He graduated from the four-year Don Theological Seminary in 1912 and in June of that year passed the exam for admission to the army as a volunteer of the 2nd category. He worked as manager of the agricultural storehouse in the Land Department of the stanitsa of Kletskaya. After World War I began, Chibisov was called up for military service in October 1914 and enrolled in the reserve battalion of the Life Guards Jager Regiment. Graduating from the regimental training detachment in March 1915, he was sent to the 1st Petergof School of Praporshchiks (Warrant officers).

After graduating from the school in July Chibisov was promoted to praporshchik and sent to the front. With the Life Guards Jager Regiment, Chibisov fought on the Western and Southwestern Fronts as a battalion junior officer and company commander. He was awarded the Cross of St. George three times and the rank of staff captain. After being wounded and concussed he continued to serve as commandant of a staging point in the 2nd Guards Staging Battalion (for troops in transit), then in the 3rd Consolidated Guards Reserve Battalion. In 1917 he was commandant of the assembly staging point of the Southwestern Front in Lutsk. At the beginning of 1918 he was captured by German troops in Lutsk, but escaped with a group of soldiers and arrived in Petrograd.

Chibisov joined the Red Army in May 1918, serving as a platoon commander of a border post on the Karelian Isthmus. With the 7th Petergof Battalion he fought with White Finns in the area of Kemi. Chibisov was promoted to command a company of the 9th Rifle Regiment of the 7th Army in August 1918, and in November to commander of a battalion of the 166th Rifle Regiment. With these units he fought in battles against the Northwestern Army in the Narva sector. In late April 1919 he was appointed commander of the 86th Rifle Regiment, which he led in the fighting against White forces in the Pskov sector and was wounded. In December he was appointed assistant chief of staff of the 30th Rifle Brigade of the 10th Rifle Division of the 16th Army, with which he fought in the Polish–Soviet War. After the end of the war, he took part in the suppression of the Tambov Rebellion.

== Interwar period ==
From November 1921 he was seconded to Forces of Special Purpose (ChON), serving as assistant chief of the 1st department, chief of the operational section and first assistant chief of staff of the ChON in Pskov. In November 1923 he became assistant chief of staff of the 1st Rifle Corps of the Leningrad Military District, and in November 1924 chief of the operational section of the corps staff. Chibisov served as acting chief of staff of the 16th Rifle Division from February 1926 and in January 1927 reverted to assistant division chief of staff. He served as division chief of staff once again from August 1930. In 1935 he graduated from the Frunze Military Academy, and in November 1936 was appointed chief of the 2nd department of the district staff. From 1937 he commanded the 85th Rifle Division of the Ural Military District, and in April 1938 the 4th Rifle Corps of the Belorussian Military District.

In May 1938 Chibisov was promoted to kombrig, and to komdiv in November 1939. In June 1938 he was appointed chief of staff of the Leningrad Military District. During the Winter War, he was chief of staff of the 7th Army of the Northwestern Front. After the end of the Winter War Chibisov received a promotion to komkor, receiving the rank of lieutenant general when the army introduced general officer ranks on 4 June. In July 1940 he was appointed deputy commander of the Leningrad Military District, and in January 1941 transferred to hold the same position in the Odessa Military District.

== World War II ==
After Operation Barbarossa began, the Odessa Military District was reorganized into the Southern Front on 25 June, under the command of Army General Ivan Tyulenev. Simultaneously a new headquarters for the district was created under the leadership of Chibisov. In the first days of the war he worked to bring the troops of the district to full combat readiness, carry out the process of mobilization, form new units for the front, and evacuate industry and state facilities deeper into the country. In late June the 9th Separate Army was formed from troops of the district. The Coastal Group of Forces of the Southern Front was formed from troops of the district on 6 July for the defense of Odessa, and later renamed the Separate Coastal Army. Chibisov simultaneously commanded this army between 15 and 26 July. However, for retreating under the pressure of superior Axis troops he was relieved of command. In September 1941 he became deputy commander of the Bryansk Front, simultaneously commanding an operational group of the front from June 1942. Chibisov briefly commanded the front between 7 and 13 July.

Chibisov was appointed commander of the new 38th Army, formed from the 4th Reserve Army and the operational group, on 3 August 1942. The army transferred to the Voronezh Front on 2 September, fighting in defensive and offensive battles near Voronezh. In January and February 1943 he led the army in the Voronezh–Kastornoye offensive and the Kharkov offensive operation. In March the units of the army fought in desperate defensive battles during the Third Battle of Kharkov, at the end of which the army consolidated its positions on the line northeast of Sumy and defended there until August. Chibisov led the army in the Belgorod–Kharkov offensive operation, covering the main forces of the Voronezh Front from attacks from the northwest, and for his skillful leadership of the army in the crossing of the Dnieper Chibisov was awarded the title Hero of the Soviet Union on 29 October. Chibisov was replaced in command of the army by Kirill Moskalenko on 27 October. Despite this, he was promoted to colonel general on 7 November and appointed commander of the 3rd Shock Army of the Kalinin Front on 21 November. Chibisov led the 3rd Shock Army in the Gorodok and Vitebsk offensives, until 5 April 1944. From early April 1944 he commanded the 1st Shock Army, but on 22 May was relieved of command. Chibisov was appointed chief of the Frunze Military Academy in June.

== Postwar ==
After the war ended, Chibisov continued to lead the academy. In March 1949 he became deputy chairman of the Central Committee of DOSAAF, then assistant commander of the Belorussian Military District in October. Chibisov retired in May 1954 and died in Minsk on 20 September 1959.

== Decorations ==
Chibisov was awarded the following decorations:

- Hero of the Soviet Union (29 October 1943)
- Order of Lenin (21 March 1940, 29 October 1943, 21 February 1945)
- Order of the Red Banner (22 February 1938, 3 November 1944, 24 June 1948)
- Order of Suvorov, 1st class (8 February 1943)
- Jubilee Medal "XX Years of the Workers' and Peasants' Red Army" (22 February 1938)
- Medal "For the Defence of Odessa"

== Dates of rank ==
Chibisov received the following ranks after the Red Army introduced conventional military ranks in 1935:

- Polkovnik (13 December 1935)
- Kombrig (17 February 1938)
- Komdiv (4 November 1939)
- Komkor (21 March 1940)
- General-leytenant (4 June 1940)
- General-polkovnik (7 November 1943)

== In popular culture ==
General Fotii Kobrisov, the protagonist of the 1994 novel The General and His Army by Georgi Vladimov, was based on Chibisov. The book focused on the Battle of Moscow (1941) and the Battle of Kiev (1943). The novel differed from the real-life biography of Chibisov in that he did not take part in the former. The book was awarded the Russian Booker Prize in 1995 and the Sakharov Prize in 2000.

Military offices
Preceded by Yakov Cherevichenko	Commanding General of the Odessa Military District; 1941	Succeeded by Ivan Ivanov
Preceded by Newly Formed	Commanding General of the Separate Coastal Army; July 1941	Succeeded by Lieutenant General Georgy Sofronov
Preceded by Lieutenant General Filipp Golikov	Commanding General of the Bryansk Front; 7–13 July 1942	Succeeded by Lieutenant General Konstantin Rokossovsky
Preceded by Newly formed	Commanding General of the 4th Reserve Army; August 1942	Succeeded by Redesignated as 38th Army (2nd Formation)
Preceded by Reformed from 4th Reserve Army	Commanding General of the 38th Army; August 1942 – October 1943	Succeeded by Kirill Moskalenko
Preceded by Kuzma Galitsky	Commanding General of the 3rd Shock Army; November 1943	Succeeded by Vasily Yushkevich
Preceded by Lieutenant General Gennady Korotkov	Commanding General of the 1st Shock Army; April 1944 – May 1944	Succeeded by Lieutenant General Nikanor Zakhvataev
Preceded by Nikolai Veryovkin-Rakhalsky	Commandant of the Frunze Military Academy; 1944–1948	Succeeded by Vyacheslav Tsvetayev
