= Romanovsky (rural locality) =

Set index of articles associated with the same name

Romanovsky (Russian: Романовский; masculine), Romanovskaya (Романовская; feminine), or Romanovskoye (Романовское; neuter) is the name of several rural localities in Russia:

- Romanovsky, Kemerovo Oblast, a settlement in Ust-Sosnovskaya Rural Territory of Topkinsky District of Kemerovo Oblast
- Romanovsky, Republic of Mordovia, a settlement in Russko-Karayevsky Selsoviet of Temnikovsky District of the Republic of Mordovia
- Romanovsky, Orenburg Oblast, a settlement in Romanovsky Selsoviet of Alexandrovsky District of Orenburg Oblast
- Romanovsky, Rostov Oblast, a khutor in Donskoye Rural Settlement of Orlovsky District of Rostov Oblast
- Romanovsky, Ulyanovsk Oblast, a settlement in Fabrichno-vyselkovsky Rural Okrug of Novospassky District of Ulyanovsk Oblast
- Romanovskoye, Kaluga Oblast, a village in Kozelsky District of Kaluga Oblast
- Romanovskoye, Kostroma Oblast, a village in Petrovskoye Settlement of Chukhlomsky District of Kostroma Oblast
- Romanovskoye, Kurgan Oblast, a selo in Novodostovalovsky Selsoviet of Belozersky District of Kurgan Oblast
- Romanovskoye, Moscow Oblast, a village in Bazarovskoye Rural Settlement of Kashirsky District of Moscow Oblast
- Romanovskoye, Smolensk Oblast, a village in Slobodskoye Rural Settlement of Monastyrshchinsky District of Smolensk Oblast
- Romanovskoye, Tver Oblast, a selo in Romanovskoye Rural Settlement of Vesyegonsky District of Tver Oblast
- Romanovskoye, Tyumen Oblast, a selo in Berkutsky Rural Okrug of Yalutorovsky District of Tyumen Oblast
- Romanovskoye, Vladimir Oblast, a selo in Alexandrovsky District of Vladimir Oblast
- Romanovskaya, Kholmogorsky District, Arkhangelsk Oblast, a village in Ukhtostrovsky Selsoviet of Kholmogorsky District of Arkhangelsk Oblast
- Romanovskaya, Shenkursky District, Arkhangelsk Oblast, a village in Nikolsky Selsoviet of Shenkursky District of Arkhangelsk Oblast
- Romanovskaya, Ustyansky District, Arkhangelsk Oblast, a village in Minsky Selsoviet of Ustyansky District of Arkhangelsk Oblast
- Romanovskaya, Rostov Oblast, a stanitsa in Romanovskoye Rural Settlement of Volgodonskoy District of Rostov Oblast
