= Museum of Local History of Volgodonsk District =

Local museum in Volgodonsky, Rostov, Russia

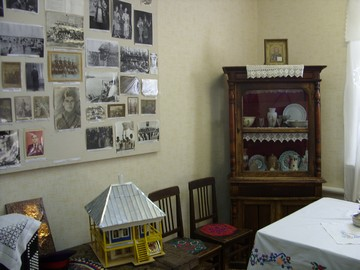
- Established: 1998
- Location: Plot 71, 50 Years of Victory Street, Romanovskaya, Volgodonsky District, Rostov Oblast, Russia
- Type: Local museum
- Director: Dzyuba Irina Anatolyevna

Museum of Local History of Volgodonsk District (Russian: Музей краеведения Волгодонского района ) is a museum of local history in the village Romanovskaya, Rostov region. The director is Dzyuba Irina Anatolyevna. The museum was opened in 1998. It is located in the building built in 1908 with a total area of 516 m². Visiting of the museum is included in tourist routes of regional travel companies.

== Activity ==
The main directions of the museum's work are the storage and exhibition of antiquities, everyday life of peoples inhabiting the region; the revival and preservation of folk traditions, customs, rituals, crafts and crafts inherent in the population of the Rostov region in Volgodonsk district.

Special attention is paid to patriotic education of youth and younger generation.

The museum developed and operates a patriotic section "Soldier's medallion", which allowed to find the nameless graves and military burial places of the Great Patriotic War on the territory of the district, to restore the names of the dead soldiers.

== Exposition ==
The main fund of the museum - 1097 units of storage, scientific and auxiliary - 608 units of storage.

Also, the museum developed a layout of the village, in a scale of 1:5.
