= Romanovsky =

Romanovsky (masculine), Romanovskaya (feminine), or Romanovskoye (neuter) may refer to:

- Romanovsky (surname)
- Romanovsky District, name of several districts in Russia
- Romanovsky (rural locality) (Romanovskaya, Romanovskoye), name of several rural localities in Russia
- Romanovskoye, Kyrgyzstan, a town in Kyrgyzstan
