= Veryovkin =

Veryovkin (Russian: Верёвкин) sometimes transliterated as Verevkin, feminine: Veryovkina is a Russian surname associated with the ancient Russian noble Veryovkin family. Notable people with the surname include:

- Aleksandr Veryovkin, Russian cave diver, the namesake of the Veryovkina Cave
- Marianne von Werefkin (1860–1938), Russian painter active in Germany and Switzerland
- Nikolay Veryovkin-Rakhalsky
- Vladimir Verevkin
