= First Battle of Kharkov =

1941 battle of WW2 on the Eastern Front

- Part of the Eastern Front of World War II
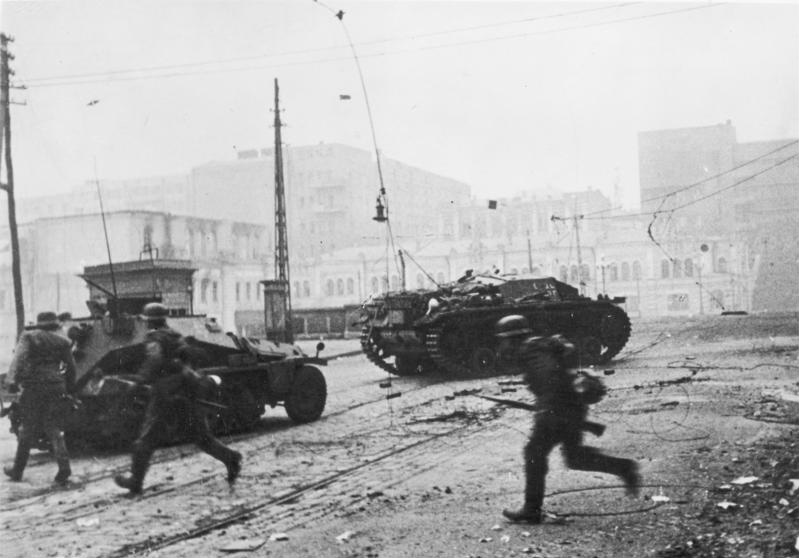
- German infantry and armored vehicles battle Soviet defenders on the streets of Kharkov
Date	20–24 October 1941 (4 days)
Location	Kharkov, Ukrainian SSR, Soviet Union 49°59′N 36°13′E
Result	German victory

Belligerents
Germany	Soviet Union

Commanders and leaders
(Nazi Germany) Erwin Vierow (Nazi Germany) Anton Dostler	(Soviet Union) Viktor Tsyganov

Strength
Two divisions 1 Sturmgeschütz battalion 10,000–30,000 men (est.); 12 StuG III	One division (Note: According to Glantz 2001, p. 247–248, the strength of the weakened Southwestern Front on 30 September was 147,110 men, mostly survivors from the battle of Kiev. Reinforcements sent after this date include several NKVD divisions and brigades fighting as regular ground units.)

Casualties and losses
Unknown	96,509 casualties (Note: According to Glantz 2001, p. 248, the losses of the Southwestern Front from 30 September to 30 November numbered 96,509 men, including 75,720 irrecoverable (dead, missing or captured) and 20,789 sick and wounded.)
- Location within the European Soviet Union

The First Battle of Kharkov was a battle that took place from 20 to 24 October 1941 for control of the city of Kharkov, (Note: Kharkov is the Russian language name of the city, while Kharkiv is the Ukrainian one; both Russian and Ukrainian were official languages in the Soviet Union Language Policy in the Soviet Union L.A. Grenoble & Eastern Europe and the Commonwealth of Independent States, Routledge) located in the Ukrainian SSR, during the final stage of Operation Barbarossa. The battle was fought between the German 6th Army, part of Army Group South, and the Soviet Southwestern Front. The Soviet 38th Army was tasked with defending the city while its factories were dismantled and moved to a more easterly location.

The main objective for the German 6th Army was to capture Kharkov, which would help them close the growing gap between themselves and the German 17th Army. By 20 October, the Germans had advanced to the western edge of the city, and by 24 October, the 57th Infantry Division was able to take control of Kharkov. By this time, however, most of the city's industrial facilities had been evacuated or rendered useless by Soviet authorities.

== Importance of Kharkov ==
=== Kharkov's railroad system ===
In the fall of 1941, Kharkov was of great strategic importance to the Soviets due to its vital rail and air connections. The city served as a crucial north–south and east–west link between many regions of Ukraine, as well as various areas of the USSR such as the Crimea, the Caucasus, the Dnieper region, and the Donbass.

=== Military importance ===
As one of the largest industrial centers in the Soviet Union, Kharkov played a significant role in contributing to the country's military capabilities. In particular, the Kharkov Tractor Plant was instrumental in the design and development of the Soviet T-34 tank, and the highly productive facility was a symbol of the city's industrial prowess. In addition to the Tractor Plant, Kharkov was home to other important industrial facilities such as the Kharkov Aircraft Plant, the Kharkov Plant of the NKVD (FED), and the Kharkov Turbine Plant.

The city's military industries were responsible for the production of several critical military assets, including Su-2 aircraft, artillery tractors, 82mm mortars, submachine guns, ammunition, and other equipment. Given the strategic importance of Kharkov's industrial production, German forces set their sights on seizing control of the city's railroads and military factories during the First Battle of Kharkov.

Adolf Hitler himself emphasized the importance of capturing these military installations, recognizing that the region, especially the Donets Basin extending from the Kharkov area, was the foundation of the Russian economy. The Germans believed that control of this vital economic center would inevitably lead to the collapse of the entire Russian economy. As a result, they fought fiercely to retain control of the Kharkov industrial area.

=== Population of Kharkov ===
Kharkov, a major Soviet city, had a population of 901,000 on 1 May 1941. By September of that year, however, the population had swelled to 1.5 million due to an influx of evacuees from other cities seeking refuge from the ongoing war. After enduring years of deadly conflict, Kharkov's population dwindled significantly to between 180,000 and 190,000 by the time the city was retaken in August 1943.

== Before the battle ==
=== The aftermath of Kiev ===
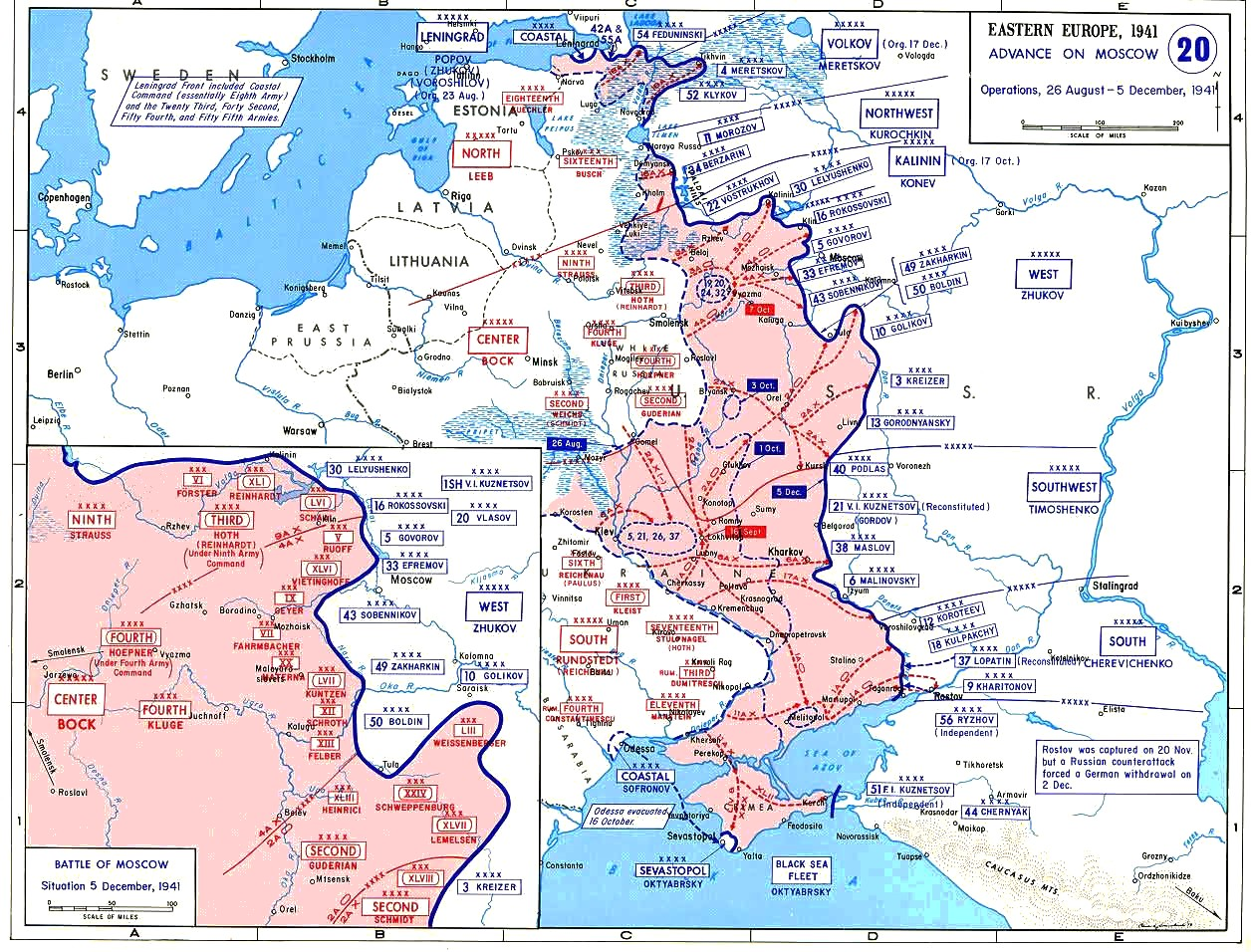
German advances, 26 August – 5 December 1941

After the Battle of Kiev, the German Army High Command (OKH) ordered the Army Group Center to redeploy its forces for the attack on Moscow. As a result, the 2nd Panzer Group turned north toward Bryansk and Kursk. In its place, Army Group South, led by Walther von Reichenau's 6th Army and Carl-Heinrich von Stülpnagel's 17th Army, took command of the Panzer divisions. Meanwhile, the main offensive formation of Army Group South, Paul Ludwig Ewald von Kleist's 1st Panzer Group, received orders to move south toward Rostov-on-Don and the Caucasian oil fields in accordance with Führer Directive No. 35. While the 1st Panzer Group secured the German victory at the Battle of Melitopol, the burden of processing the 600,000 Soviet prisoners of war from Kiev fell to the 6th and 17th Armies, resulting in a three-week regrouping period for those two armies.

To stabilize its southern flank, Stavka (the Soviet High Command) poured reinforcements into the area between Kursk and Rostov at the expense of its forces in front of Moscow. The Southwestern Front, decimated during the Battle of Kiev, was rebuilt under the command of Marshal Semyon Timoshenko, known as one of the Red Army's most capable commanders. The 6th, 21st, 38th and 40th Armies were reconstituted almost from scratch.

=== Approaching Kharkov ===
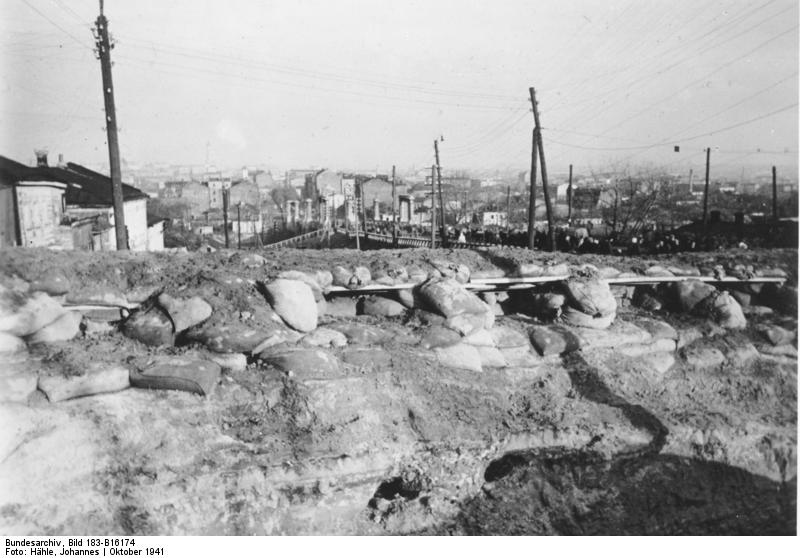
Soviet bunkers used in the defense of Kharkov

During the Battle of Moscow, the Germans found it crucial to protect their flanks, and they applied these lessons in their march towards Kharkov. On 6 October, von Reichenau led an advance through Sumy and Okhtyrka towards Belgorod and Kharkov. At the same time, the 17th Army launched an offensive from Poltava toward Lozova and Izyum to protect the long flank of the 1st Panzer Army (formerly the 1st Panzer Group). This offensive resulted in the Soviet 6th Army (commanded by Rodion Malinovsky) and the 38th Army (commanded by Viktor Tsiganov) being pushed back in disarray. As the Battle of Moscow approached, the Soviet Red Army suffered major defeats at Vyazma and Bryansk, resulting in 700,000 casualties. The meager reserves available were urgently needed to defend the Soviet capital, leaving the Southwestern Front vulnerable. With no reinforcements to fill the gap, the Soviets were forced to retreat to Voronezh to prevent the collapse of their southern flank.

The German Army's primary objectives before winter were to seize Leningrad, Moscow, and the approaches to the Caucasian oil fields. Kharkov, though a secondary objective, was of vital importance. In addition to protecting the flanks of their motorized spearheads, the Germans valued Kharkov for its industrial importance and its role as a critical rail junction. Capturing the city would push the Soviet armies of the Southwest and Southern Fronts back toward Voronezh and Stalingrad, cutting off their main transportation hubs. By the second week of October, however, the German offensive was hampered by the Rasputitsa mud season and logistical challenges in the area between the Dnieper River and the front lines. All road bridges had collapsed, and the threat of ice posed a challenge to pontoon replacements. To ensure the capture of Kharkov, Hitler diverted resources from the 17th Army to support the 6th Army. This weakened the 17th Army's efforts to protect the flank of the 1st Panzer Army and contributed to the German defeat at the Battle of Rostov. After 17 October, night frosts improved road conditions, but the autumn-equipped Germans were hampered by snow and cold, partially because they had prepared under the expectation that the entire Barbarossa invasion could be completed before winter.

== Course of the battle ==
=== Preparing to take the city ===
The task of attacking Kharkov itself was assigned to the German LV. Armeekorps under the command of General der Infanterie Erwin Vierow. This corps consisted of three divisions: 101st Leichte-Division, under the command of Generalleutnant Josef Brauner von Haydringen, advancing from the north; the 57th Infanterie-Division, under the command of Generalmajor Anton Dostler, advancing from the south; and the 100th Leichte-Division, which did not take part in the battle. Hauptmann Kurt von Barisani's Sturmgeschütz-Abteilung 197 had two of its three batteries attached to the 57. Infanterie-Division and provided close fire support during the attack.

For the defense of Kharkov, the Soviet 216th Rifle Division had been re-established there after its destruction in Kiev. However, it received little to no support, as the 38th Army was in strategic retreat and planned to defend Kharkov only until its factory equipment had been evacuated.

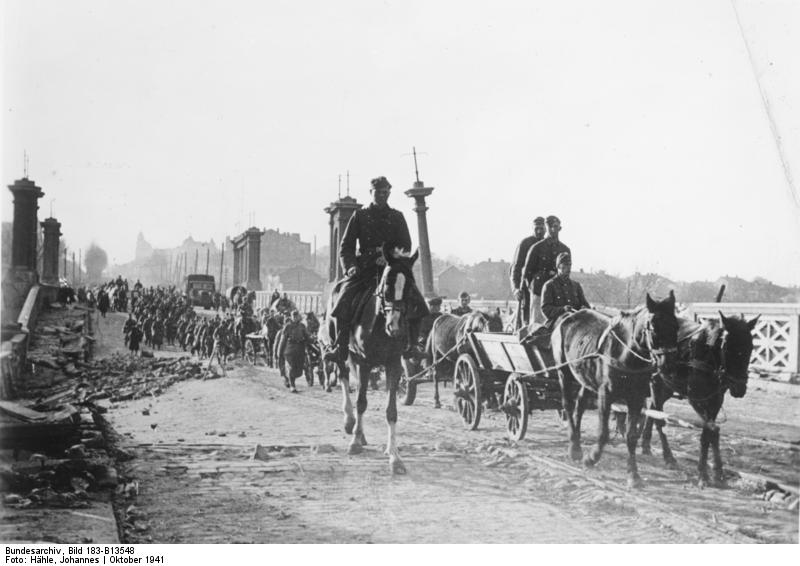
German troops enter Kharkov from the west, crossing the main railroad running through the city on the viaduct of Sverdlov Street.

=== Battles on the western edge of the city (20–23 October) ===
==== 101st Light Division ====
By 21 October, the 101st Light Division had advanced to a position about six kilometers west of Kharkov. As the spearhead of the division, the 228th Light Regiment positioned its 1st and 3rd Battalions defensively at the front, while the 2nd Battalion remained in reserve. On 22 October, the regiment was assigned to conduct reconnaissance to assess enemy strength. Later that day, around noon, a Soviet infantry battalion with tank support launched an attack against the regiment. The regiment successfully repulsed the attack and managed to disable two enemy tanks. During the night, reconnaissance information was relayed to division headquarters, revealing that the 216th Rifle Division had taken up position on the western edge of the city, reinforcing its position with machine gun nests, mortar pits, and minefields.

In preparation for the upcoming offensive, the 3rd Battalion (positioned on the regiment's right flank) received reinforcements, including two guns from the division's artillery unit, the 85th Artillery Regiment, a company of engineers, and an 88 mm anti-aircraft gun. The 2nd Battalion received the same reinforcements except for the anti-aircraft gun. Meanwhile, the 1st Battalion was designated as the regimental reserve. In addition, the 1st Battalion of the 229th Light Regiment was assigned to secure the left flank of the 228th.

The planned hour for the attack was set for noon to coincide with the actions of the 57th Infantry Division. However, due to a delay in the readiness of the 85th Artillery, the attack had to be postponed. During this time, the anti-tank company, which had been stuck in the mud in the rear, finally reached the front and was ordered to provide a 37mm AT gun platoon to each frontline battalion. Finally, at 14:25, the artillery was fully prepared and the attack was rescheduled for 15:00.

=== Assault on the city (23–24 October) ===
The evacuation of industrial plants had begun before the Germans arrived and was nearly complete by 20 October 1941. A total of 320 trains were used to transport equipment from 70 large factories. On 24 October 1941, Kharkov was captured by von Reichenau's 6th Army.

== Occupation of Kharkov ==
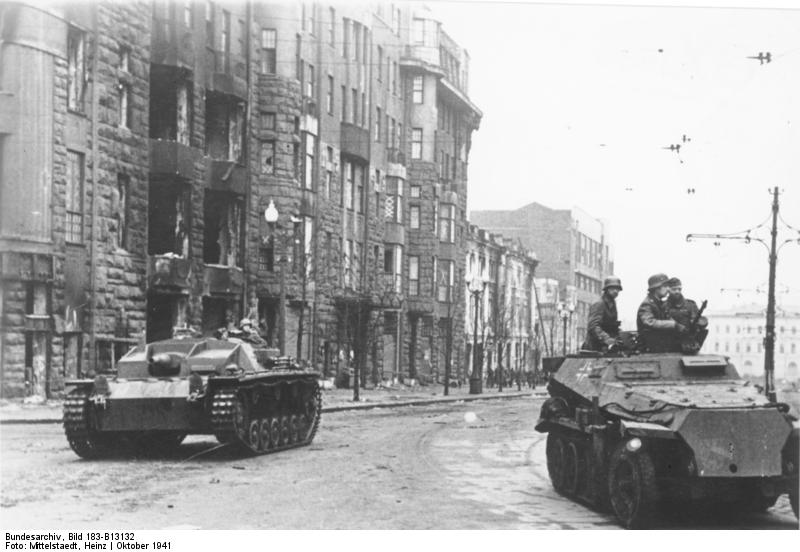
German armored vehicles in Kharkov

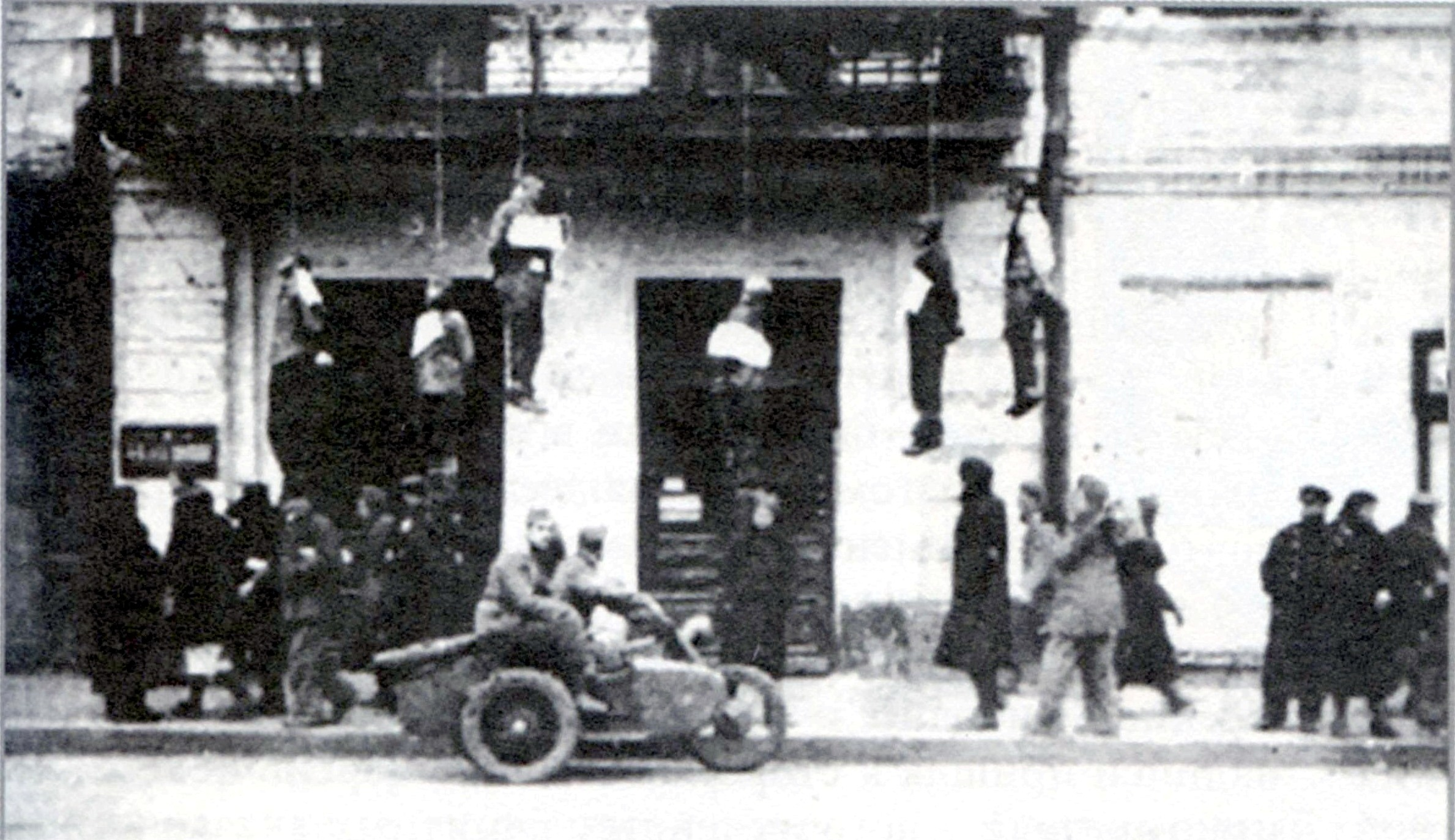
Sumskaya street in Kharkov, 25 October 1941

Following the battle's conclusion, Kharkov experienced its first occupation during the war, which lasted until 16 February 1943. Kharkov did not become part of the Reichskommissariat Ukraine due to its proximity to the front. The staff of the LV Army Corps acted as the occupation authority, with the 57th ID served as the occupation force. Generalmajor Anton Dostler held the position of Stadtkommandant until 13 December, when he was succeeded by Generalleutnant Alfred von Puttkamer. Kharkov was then transferred to the Heeresgebiet of the 6th Army and placed under the joint authority of the Stadtkommandant and Field Command 757.

German troops, acting under the authority of the Reichenau-Befehl of 10 October (effectively an order to execute anyone associated with Communism), terrorized the remaining population after the battle. Several corpses of Soviet commanders were displayed on balconies to instill fear in those who remained. This caused many people to flee the city and generally created chaos.

In the early morning hours of 14 November, several buildings in the city center were detonated by timer devices left behind by the retreating Red Army. Casualties included the commander (Generalleutnant Georg Braun) and staff of the 68th Infantry Division. The Germans then arrested about 200 civilians, mostly Jews, and hanged them from the balconies of large buildings. Another 1,000 people were taken hostage and interned in the Hotel International on Dzerzhinsky Square. These war crimes were committed by front-line Wehrmacht commanders, not SS troops.

On 14 December, the Stadtkommandant ordered the confinement of the Jewish population to a shantytown near the Kharkov Tractor Factory. Within two days, 20,000 Jews were gathered there. Sonderkommando 4a, commanded by SS-Standartenführer Paul Blobel of Einsatzgruppe C, began shooting them in December and continued the killings throughout January using a gas van. This vehicle was modified to hold 50 people and drove around the city, slowly killing those trapped inside with carbon monoxide emitted from the vehicle itself and channeled into an airtight compartment. The victims died from a combination of carbon monoxide poisoning and suffocation.

The German army confiscated large quantities of food for its troops, causing acute shortages in Ukraine. By January 1942, about one-third of the city's remaining 300,000 inhabitants were starving, and many died during the harsh winter months.

The fighting in Kharkov left the city in ruins, with many architectural monuments destroyed and artistic treasures looted. The famous Soviet writer Aleksey Nikolayevich Tolstoy wrote: "I saw Kharkiv. As if it were Rome in the 5th century. A huge cemetery..."

== See also ==
- Second Battle of Kharkov
- Third Battle of Kharkov
- Belgorod–Kharkov offensive operation

== Sources ==
- Chen, Peter (2004–2007). "First Battle of Kharkov". World War II Database.
- Glantz, David M. (2001). Before Stalingrad, Tempus Publishing Ltd. ISBN 0-7524-2692-3
- Kharkov News
- Kiessling, Hannes (2007–2011). Bericht über die Einnahme von Charkow, 57.Infanterie-Division. Retrieved 14–08–2011
- Kirchubel, Robert (2003). Operation Barbarossa 1941: Army Group South, Praeger Publishers. ISBN 0-275-98282-3
- Margry, Karel (February 2001). "Kharkov", After The Battle, Issue 112, p. 3–45
- Memoir of Kharkov’s History
- Ukrainian Historical Journal
