= 38th Army (Soviet Union) =

- 38-я армия
- Active: August 1941 – July 1942 (merged with 21st Army); August 1942 – May 1946 ?–1991
- Country: Soviet Union
- Branch: Red Army / Soviet Army
- Type: Combined arms
- Size: Field Army
- Part of: Carpathian Military District
- Garrison/HQ: Ivano-Frankivsk
- Engagements: World War II; First Battle of Kiev; First Battle of Kharkov; Barvenkovo–Lozovaya Offensive; First Battle of Voronezh; Western Carpathian Offensive; Operation Danube

Commanders
- Notable commanders: Viktor Tsyganov; Kirill Moskalenko; Nikandr Chibisov

The 38th Red Banner Army (Russian: 38-я армия) was a field army of the Soviet Union that existed between 1941 and 1991.

== August 1941 to January 1942 ==
The 38th Army was formed on 4 August 1941 after a large Soviet force had been surrounded by Axis forces in the area of Uman in western Ukraine. Under the command of Lieutenant-General Dmitry Ryabyshev, 38th Army was based on the forces and headquarters of the 8th Mechanised Corps and incorporated other Soviet units then in the Cherkassy area. The army was subordinated to the Soviet Southwestern Front command, and Riabyshev's task was to defend the line of the Dnepr upriver from Kremenchuk, a task that became more urgent after the Soviet forces at Uman surrendered on 12 August and German forces began to close up to the Dnepr.

On 30 August Riabyshev was assigned to command Soviet forces further south and Major-General Nikolay Feklenko was appointed to the command of 38th Army. By then 38th Army (based on seven rifle divisions, four cavalry divisions and two tank battalions) had been made responsible for an additional stretch of the Dnepr southeast of Kremenchuk to the river's confluence with the Vorskla. It was along this section of the Dnepr that the German Seventeenth Army forced a crossing on 31 August. German high command intended to develop this crossing into a bridgehead that would form the southern arm of an encirclement of much of Southwestern Front east of the Dnepr. (The northern arm of this encirclement had already crossed the river Desna 200 kilometres northeast of Kiev).

Feklenko was ordered to eliminate Seventeenth Army's bridgehead as soon as possible, but he was unable to do so. German reinforcements were fed into the lodgement including panzer divisions from the German First Panzer Group, and the Germans were able to enlarge their bridgehead. On 12 September German armoured forces broke through 38th Army's lines and struck north, first to Lubny and then to Lokhavytsa where, on 16 September, they made contact with German armoured forces moving south from Romny. Most of Southwestern Front, including much of 38th Army, was caught in the trap, and few of the encircled Soviet forces escaped.

Maj. Gen. Viktor Tsyganov was appointed to replace Feklenko (Tsyganov's chief of staff was Maj. Gen. Aleksei Maslov), but there was little that Tsyganov could do, despite the Soviet reserves being rushed to eastern Ukraine, to prevent the remnants of his army being pushed back towards Poltava. By the beginning of October 38th Army included six rifle divisions and tank division, but during October, under constant pressure from the German Sixth Army, it was forced to withdraw to the east on the Poltava - Kharkov axis towards the Donets. Since the German mechanized forces in the region had been directed towards Moscow and Rostov, 38th Army easily avoided encirclement by the slow-moving infantry divisions of Sixth Army. Tsyganov's forces abandoned Kharkov on 24 October, and by early November the frontline had begun to stabilize east of the Donets in the Kupyansk area. In December, with Tsyganov's departure from 38th Army, Maslov was appointed to the Army's command and Lieutenant-Colonel Semyon Ivanov became the army's chief of staff.

At the beginning of 1942 Maslov's forces, based on just five rifle divisions, were required to participate in a general offensive by Soviet forces in Ukraine to retake Kursk, Kharkov and the Donbas region. On 5 January the right flank of 38th Army attacked the German Sixth Army's positions northeast of Kharkov in an attempt to advance on Belgorod, but Maslov had failed to disguise his intentions and the German defences were well prepared. By the second week of January Southwestern Front's offensives north of Kharkov, including that of 38th Army, had ground to a halt. However, a complementary offensive further south had been more effective and Soviet forces had made a deep penetration into the German lines south of Kharkov.

== February to July 1942 ==
During the late winter and spring of 1942 the frontline in the Kharkov area was relatively static. An additional Soviet army was introduced into the frontline on 38th Army's right, resulting in 38th Army relinquishing responsibility for the northern section of its frontline positions, but acquiring responsibility for more of the frontline further south. Part of these new frontline positions were within the salient into German lines that Southwestern Front had established south of Kharkov in January (the so-called Barvenkovo Pocket). During this time 38th Army experienced two changes in command; Maslov was dismissed in February, and in March Major-General Kirill Moskalenko was appointed to the command of the army. (Ivanov, promoted to the rank of colonel in January 1942, remained as chief of staff).

During the spring of 1942 Soviet high command had been preparing a renewed offensive to take Kharkov. The plan envisaged the envelopment of the city from north and south, the southern arm of the envelopment being based on an advance to the north by an army within the Barvenkovo Pocket off 38th Army's left flank. This offensive opened on 12 May. The attacks north of Kharkov were held by German forces, and in the south the Germans responded by launching an offensive of their own against the shoulders of the Barvenkovo Pocket. The southern shoulder was attacked by powerful mechanised forces on 17 May, and on the northern shoulder the positions of 38th Army's left flank in the Balakliya area were attacked two days later. By 23 May the Soviet forces in the Barvenkovo Pocket, including two entire field armies, a mechanised group, part of a third army and part of 38th Army, had been cut off. By the end of the month the encircled force had been destroyed, less than one in ten of the surrounded personnel being able to effect an escape, and Moskalenko was left defending roughly the same positions in the Kupyansk area that 38th Army had occupied in November 1941. Yet despite his losses, Moskalenko's army, facing the right wing of the German Sixth Army and the left flank of First Panzer Army, at this time included eight rifle divisions amply supported by armour.

On the morning of 28 June the main German strategic offensive of 1942 (Case Blue) opened with an attack from the Kursk area towards the Don at Voronezh. The German objective was to advance down the right bank of the Don to cut in behind Southwestern Front and so isolate it from its sources of supply. By 6 July this objective had become clear to Soviet high command and the next day, in order to avoid a major encirclement, Southwestern Front was authorised to retreat to the east. As the days passed this retreat became increasingly chaotic and by 12 July Moskalenko was struggling to maintain close control over his forces, which were in danger of being surrounded at Markivka. One week later and 100 kilometres further to the southeast, part of 38th Army was surrounded at Millerovo. The rest of Moskalenko's army was able to cross to the relative safety of the left bank of the Don, but on 23 July most of its residual forces were assigned to 21st Army, 38th Army was formally disbanded, and Moskalenko's headquarters was withdrawn into the high command reserve. (Three days later Moskalenko and his headquarters staff were assigned to command the newly formed 1st Tank Army).

== August 1942 to June 1943 ==
On 3 August 1942 the 4th Reserve Army, part of the Soviet strategic reserve, was designated as the second formation of 38th Army and was assigned to Bryansk Front on a relatively quiet sector of the frontline northeast of Kastornoe facing part of the German Second Army. The commander of 38th Army was Lieutenant-General Nikandr Chibisov, and its chief of staff was Colonel Anton Pilipenko. In September command responsibility for 38th Army and for 38th Army's sector of the frontline was transferred from the left flank of Bryansk Front to the right flank of the more southerly Voronezh Front. On 13 January 1943 Voronezh Front launched a major offensive against Axis forces on the middle Don in the Rossosh area, employing forces on its left flank and centre. Within days this offensive had proved successful, leaving Second Army in a deep salient, and Soviet high command proposed an extension of the offensive north to the Kastornoe area in an effort to encircle Second Army west of Voronezh. This operation (the Voronezh-Kastornoe Operation) would involve four Soviet armies and would include an attack on Second Army's positions by 38th Army. The operation, hurriedly prepared, commenced on 24 January. Recognising the threat to Second Army, later that day German high command authorised its withdrawal from exposed positions at Voronezh, but the bulk of the army was surrounded when Soviet forces from north and south met at Kastornoe on 28 January. Over the next five days 38th Army was involved in attempts to subdue the surrounded forces of Second Army but on 2 February it was assigned to participate in a general advance of Voronezh Front to the west and southwest (towards Kursk and Kharkov respectively). Chibisov's forces took Tim on 5 February, reached Oboyan on 18 February and by early March were approaching Sumy. However German counter-attacks from south and southwest of Kharkov in the second half of February and the first half of March thwarted efforts by Voronezh Front to advance west of Sumy towards the Desna river. During the second half of March the frontline stabilised around the Kursk Salient, a rectangular salient of 15,000 square kilometres that protruded into German lines north, west and south of the city of Kursk. The salient's frontline, in which 38th Army was positioned in the southwest corner on Voronezh front's right flank south of Koronevo, remained largely unchanged through the rest of March, April, May and June.

== July to September 1943 ==
On 5 July 1943 Germany's last strategic offensive on the Eastern Front (Operation Citadel) opened with attacks on the northern and southern shoulders of the Kursk Salient. The objective was to envelop and destroy the defending Central and Voronezh Fronts north and south of Kursk. At that time 38th Army, occupying what was expected to be a relatively quiet sector of the frontline facing VII Army Corps of the German Second Army, was based on six rifle divisions and two tank brigades. The German offensive ran into well prepared Soviet defences, but the offensive in the south made sufficient progress towards Oboyan that Soviet high command, having already committed much of its reserves, had to withdraw forces from quieter sectors. During July Chibisov saw one of his rifle divisions and all of his armour withdrawn for deployment elsewhere.

On 12 July Soviet forces began to go over to the offensive. Although during July and August the forces of Voronezh Front made considerable advances east of the Psel river, advancing south to within 50 kilometres of Poltava, 38th Army's positions on the other side of the Psel (on Voronezh Front's extreme right flank south of Korenevo) changed little. However, by the end of August Soviet forces had penetrated deeply into the German lines north of Korenevo and south of Sumy, prompting, by early September, a general German retreat to the Dnepr. Chibisov's forces took Sumy on 2 September and advanced rapidly west towards Kiev. On 21 September Chibisov was ordered to direct his efforts towards Pukhovka on the lower Desna north of Kiev and to try to develop an encirclement of Kiev from the north. Within a week 38th Army had crossed the Desna and had seized two small bridgeheads across the Dnepr north of Kiev in the Lutezh area. The bridgeheads were subsequently linked to form a viable lodgement on the right bank of the Dnepr, but Chibisov's forces were unable to achieve a breakout.

October 1943 to February 1944

Throughout October the German Fourth Panzer Army was able to prevent a breakout from the Lutezh bridgehead and was able to limit Soviet attempts to expand the lodgement. In the last week of October Soviet forces in the bridgehead were strengthened considerably, much of this reinforcement going undetected by German military intelligence. During September 38 Army's five rifle divisions had been strengthened by the addition of a further three rifle divisions and a tank corps, and by the beginning of November it had been further strengthened with another three rifle divisions. Also at this time Chibisov was reassigned and Moskalenko, by this time with the rank of colonel-general, returned to the command of 38th Army. A renewed breakout effort, made with the assistance of a massive artillery bombardment, was launched on 3 November, with 38th Army attacking south towards Kiev from the southern sector of the bridgehead. The scale and ferocity of the assault took the defending German VII Army Corps by surprise. Supported by 3rd Guards Tank Army, Moskalenko's forces broke through the German lines on the first day. By that evening they had reached Kiev, and by the next day German forces had been cleared from the city.

After the capture of Kiev, 38th Army advanced rapidly to the southwest, taking Radomyshl on 11 November and Zhitomir the next day. However, the defending German Fourth Panzer Army had by then assembled reserves and counter-attacked 38th Army, retaking Zhitomir on 17 November and continuing to drive Moskalenko's forces back to the northeast of Radomyshl. By the third week of December additional Soviet armies had been introduced into the Red Army's penetration west and southwest of Kiev, and Moskalenko's forces occupied the Brusilov sector of the frontline southeast of Radomyshl. A renewed Soviet offensive effort to the southwest was opened on 24 December when, in conjunction with two tank armies, 38th Army advanced towards Kazatin, the town being taken six days later. During January 1944 the forces of First Ukrainian Front (the former Voronezh Front, renamed on 20 October 1943) advanced further to the southwest to Berdichev (taken on 5 January) to Vinnitsa and towards Zhmerinka, but the advance to the upper Bug was repulsed by German forces and during February the frontline stabilised southwest of Berdichev and Kazatin. By then 38th Army, having been on First Ukrainian Front's extreme right flank north of Kiev at the end of October 1943, found itself on the Front's extreme left wing south of Kazatin four months later.

== March to November 1944 ==
On 4 March 1st Ukrainian Front renewed its offensive to the southwest in what rapidly developed into a general offensive across western Ukraine involving 25 Soviet armies. At that time 38th Army was based on eleven rifle divisions under four corps headquarters. (The tank corps had been withdrawn from 38th Army to be used as the basis of a new tank army). Having forced a gap in the lines of the defending German First Panzer Army, Moskalenko's forces, in conjunction with two tank armies advanced on Vinnitsa and Zhmerinka, taking both towns during the third week of March. On 25 March 1944 Pilipenko, who had been promoted to the rank of major-general in January 1943, was killed in a plane crash, and he was replaced as the army's chief of staff by Lieutenant-General Vasilii Vorobev. By mid-April 1944 the army had reached the river Siret near the eastern foothills of the Carpathian mountain range, and had secured several bridgeheads on the right bank of the river southwest of Chernovtsy. Here the frontline stabilised during the late spring and early summer of 1944, during which, after some regrouping of First Ukrainian Front's forces, 38th Army was positioned west of Ternopil on the Lvov axis.

On 13 July Moskalenko's forces participated in a major offensive by First Ukrainian Front to advance from the Western Bug to the Vistula. In preparation for this offensive 38th Army was, during July, doubled in strength from five to ten rifle divisions. As the offensive developed the forces of First Ukrainian Front began to diverge; the bulk of its forces on the right and centre advanced west on the Lvov axis striking across the river San and towards the Vistula, while the two armies on the Front's left flank (to the left of 38th Army) advanced southwest on the Stanislav axis towards the northern Carpathians. This anomalous situation was resolved on 5 August when First Ukrainian Front's two left flank armies were assigned to Fourth Ukrainian Front, at which time 38th Army found itself once again the extreme left wing of First Ukrainian Front. Moskalenko's forces continued to advance to the west, crossing the San southwest of Przemysl and establishing a stable frontline north of the Carpathians in the Krosno area by the end of August. Early in September 38th Army was further reinforced with a tank corps, a cavalry corps and the Red Army's Czechoslovak corps. On 8 September the army launched an offensive to break into Slovakia through the Dukla Pass. This offensive was coordinated with an uprising in Slovakia, but neither the uprising nor 38th Army's offensive were successful, Moskalenko's forces running into stiff German opposition in the mountains. The offensive was renewed on 28 September, but it took more than a week of hard fighting before Moskalenko's forces were able to secure the Dukla Pass on 6 October. For a further three weeks 38th Army continued to advance slowly to the south, fighting off German counter-attacks on its right flank, and eventually reaching the village of Kapisova a few kilometres north of Svidnik. This offensive was terminated on 28 October.

== November 1944 to May 1945 ==
During remainder of 1944 the frontline in the Krosno - Svidnik sector remained relatively static. At the end of November 38th Army was reassigned from the command of First Ukrainian Front to that of Fourth Ukrainian Front, though its frontline positions facing the right flank of the German Seventeenth Army and the left flank of First Panzer Army remained largely unchanged. By early January Moskalenko's forces had been pulled out of Slovakia to be concentrated west of Krosno in preparation for the Red Army's major winter offensive in Poland. This offensive was opened by First Ukrainian Front on 12 January 1945 and was joined by other Soviet Fronts over the next few days. Moskalenko's army, based on thirteen rifle divisions, attacked the positions of the German 545th Volksgrenadier Division, part of the German Seventeenth Army, on 14 January, and achieved a rapid breakthrough. Advancing west towards Nowy Sacz and Czchow, by 19 January 38th Army was across the river Dunajec and was advancing towards the river Raba south of Cracow. Two days later it was across the Raba and by 24 January it was southwest of Cracow. Thereafter the rate of advance began to slow, though by mid-February Moskalenko's forces had reached the area west of Bielsko Biala.

Further north the armies of First Ukrainian Front and First Belorussian Front had made more spectacular progress, crossing southern and central Poland, and closing up to the Oder along much of its length. Consequently, 38th Army's positions in the western Carpathians became of lesser strategic significance. On 10 March 38th Army was one of three Soviet armies to launch the Moravian-Ostrava Offensive from southern Poland across the Czech border towards Ostrava. The offensive met well-prepared and determined German resistance, and Ostrava was not taken until 30 April. The final brief offensive of 38th Army began on 6 May when it was one of more than 20 Soviet armies to launch an offensive against the German Army Group Centre in western Czechoslovakia, the key objective of which was Prague. Against collapsing opposition 38th Army advanced more than 100 kilometres west from the Ostrava area before the final surrender of Army Group Centre on 10 May.

On 1 May 1945, the army, still part of 4th Ukrainian Front, consisted of the 11th Rifle Corps (30th, 221st, 276th Rifle Divisions), 52nd Rifle Corps (121st, 241st, 305th Rifle Divisions), 101st Rifle Corps (70th Guards Rifle Division, 140th, 183rd, 226th Rifle Divisions), 126th Light Mountain Rifle Corps (31st, 32nd, 72nd Guards Rifle Brigades), 24th Artillery Breakthrough Division (174th Gun Artillery Brigade, 177th Howitzer Brigade, 180th Heavy Howitzer Artillery Brigade, 126th Super-Heavy Howitzer Brigade (габр БМ), 40th Mortar Brigade, 47th Heavy Mortar Brigade, 34th Guards Rocket Artillery Brigade), 3rd Corps Artillery Brigade, 135th Gun Artillery Brigade, 901st Mountain Corps Artillery Regiment, 6th Anti-Tank Artillery Regiment, 130th, 1506th, 1642nd, 1663rd, 1672nd Anti-Tank Artillery Regiments, 197th, 253rd, 496th Mountain Mortar Regiments, 276th, 491st Mortar Regiments, 5th and 16th Guards Rocket Artillery Regiments, 76th Anti-Aircraft Artillery Division (223rd, 416th, 447th, 591st Anti-Aircraft Artillery Regiments), 1954th Anti-Aircraft Artillery Regiment.

== WW II Commanders ==
- Lieutenant General Dmitry Ryabyshev (July - August 1941)
- Major General of the Tank Forces Nikolay Feklenko (August - September 1941)
- Major General Viktor Tsyganov (September - December 1941)
- Major General Aleksey G. Maslov (December 1941 - February 1942)
- Major General Gavril I. Sherstyuk (February - March 1942)
- Artillery Major General Kirill Moskalenko (March - July 1942)
- Colonel-General Nikandr Chibisov (August 1942 - October 1943)
- Colonel-General Kirill Moskalenko (October 1943 - August 1948)
- Colonel-General Yakov Kreizer (April 1949 - June 1955)

== Postwar ==
In January 1951 it comprised 3rd Rifle Corps (128th Guards and 318th RDs), and 35th Guards Rifle Corps (66th and 70th Guards Rifle Divisions).

By November 19, 1990, it was located in Ivano-Frankivsk as part of the Carpathian Military District. The army had 413 tanks, 758 BTR and BMP armored personnel carriers, 197 artillery guns and multiple rocket launcher systems, 40 attack and 36 transport helicopters of army aviation.

During the late 1980s, the army included the following units:

- 17th Guards Motor Rifle Division (Khmelnitsky)
- 128th Guards Motor Rifle Division (Mukachevo)
- 70th Guards Motor Rifle Division (Ivano-Frankivsk) (disbanded 1991)
- 223rd Anti-aircraft Rocket Brigade (Terebovlya)
- 335th Separate Helicopter Regiment (Kalyniv): 40 Mi-24, 24 Mi-8, 6 Mi-9
- 488th Separate Helicopter Regiment (Vapnyarka): 40 Mi-24, 25 Mi-8, 4 Mi-9
- 96th Mixed Aviation Squadron (Shypintsi): 5 Mi-8
- 222nd Engineer Brigade (Kryva): 2 Engineer recon vehicles (IRM)
- 135th Engineer Regiment
- 321st Engineer-Sapper Regiment (Kryva)
- 188th Separate Communications Regiment (Ivano-Frankivsk)

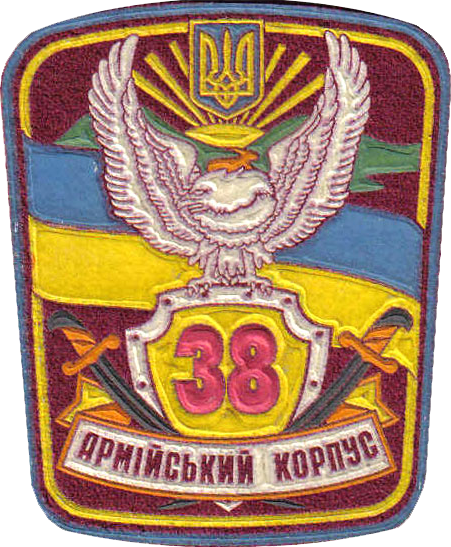
Insignia of the 38th Army Corps

After becoming part of the Ukrainian Ground Forces upon the dissolution of the Soviet Union, the army became the 38th Army Corps in 1992. On 1 January 2001, it included the following units:

- 15th Separate Mechanized Brigade (Khmelnitsky)
- 22nd Separate Mechanized Brigade (Chernivtsi)
- 128th Mechanized Division (Mukacheve)
- 432nd Rocket Brigade (Nadvirna)
- 93rd Self-Propelled Artillery Regiment (Khmelnitsky)
- 300th Anti-Aircraft Rocket Regiment (Khmelnitsky)
- 160th Reactive Artillery Regiment (Deliatyn)
- 980th Anti-Tank Artillery Regiment (Zhoevka)
- 188th Separate Communications Regiment (Ivano-Frankivsk)

The corps was disbanded in 2003.

== Notes ==
=== Bibliography ===
- Feskov, V.I.; Golikov, V.I.; Kalashnikov, K.A.; Slugin, S.A. (2013). Вооруженные силы СССР после Второй Мировой войны: от Красной Армии к Советской [The Armed Forces of the USSR after World War II: From the Red Army to the Soviet: Part 1 Land Forces] (in Russian). Tomsk: Scientific and Technical Literature Publishing. ISBN 9785895035306.
