= Viktor Tsyganov =

Soviet military officer (1896–1944)

Viktor Viktorovich Tsyganov
- Tsyganov in 1941–1942
- Born: 19 November 1896; Nizhnii Novgorod, Russian Empire
- Died: 25 June 1944 (aged 47); Moscow, Soviet Union
- Military career
- Allegiance: Russian Empire (1914–1917); Soviet Union (1918–1944)
- Service years: 1914–1944
- Rank: Lieutenant General
- Commands: 38th Army; 56th Army
- Conflicts: World War I Russian Civil War; World War II
- Awards: Order of the Red Banner; Order of the Red Star

Viktor Viktorovich Tsyganov (Russian: Виктор Викторович Цыганов; 19 November [O.S. 7 November] 1896 – 25 June 1944) was a lieutenant general of the Red Army during the Second World War.

== Early life, World War I and Russian Civil War ==
Viktor Viktorovich Tsyganov was born on 19 November 1896 in Nizhny Novgorod, the son of a priest. After graduating from a theological seminary, he became a performer, singing in different entertainment establishments. On the eve of the war in 1914, Tsyganov graduated from Kazan University. He joined the Imperial Russian Army as a volunteer in 1914 after World War I began, graduating from the Kazan Military School and a cavalry officers school in 1916. Tsyganov fought on the Northern Front as a junior officer, squadron commander, and junior adjutant at the headquarters of a Separate Cavalry Brigade of the Northern Front, reaching the rank of poruchik by 1917.

After the October Revolution, Tsyganov supported Soviet rule. During the Russian Civil War, he joined the Red Army on 2 October 1918, being assigned to the 39th Rifle Regiment as its adjutant four days later. Tsyganov became adjutant to the chief of the Nizhny Novgorod garrison on 24 December, and spent most of 1919 with the 8th Reserve Regiment in the city. On 12 November 1919 he returned to his previous post as adjutant to the chief of the garrison. After a period in the reserve of the Reserve Army headquarters from early 1920, Tsyganov was sent to the front as chief of staff of the Separate Shock Artillery Brigade on 3 August 1920. In this role, he fought against the Army of Wrangel on the Southern Front, and was wounded in the leg and contused in the stomach during the Perekop–Chongar Operation in November 1920.

== Interwar period ==
After the end of the fighting in Crimea, Tsyganov returned to Nizhny Novgorod in February 1921 as chief of staff of the Nizhny Novgorod Territorial Brigade. He served in the same role with the 73rd Separate Brigade from 12 March and the 187th Separate Brigade from 26 May. During 1921 and 1922 he took part in the suppression of anti-Soviet resistance on the Western Front in Belorussia, where he served for most of the 1920s. After being placed in the reserve of the Western Front on 22 September, Tsyganov transferred to serve as chief of staff of the 23rd Brigade of the 8th Rifle Division on 14 October, and was shifted to the front headquarters in September 1922, briefly serving as assistant chief of a section and of a department.

In November, Tsyganov was sent to serve as chief of staff of the 13th Rifle Regiment of the 5th Rifle Division. Tsyganov served in the same role with the division's 15th Rifle Regiment from March 1923, and was moved up to the 4th Rifle Corps headquarters as assistant chief of the operations section in August 1924. In April 1925 he returned to division level, becoming chief of the operations section of the 2nd Rifle Division. At the beginning of 1926, Tsyganov was transferred to the 4th Rifle Division as its assistant chief of staff, serving as its acting chief of staff from September of that year. In April 1928 he was transferred to serve as assistant chief of staff of the 18th Territorial Rifle Division at Yaroslavl.

After completing the Improvement Course for Higher Command Personnel in 1930, Tsyganov served as military instructor of the Vyatka Pedagogical Institute from the beginning of 1931 and in May of that year transferred to hold the same role at the Leningrad Institute of Physical Culture. Tsyganov graduated from the Frunze Military Academy by correspondence in 1933, and briefly commanded a rifle regiment in 1934, his only prewar command assignment. Later in 1934, he rose to the rifle division chief of staff, and in July 1935 was transferred to serve as assistant chief of the Tambov Infantry School, before holding similar instructional postings at infantry schools for the next two years. When the Red Army introduced personal ranks on 13 December 1935, he became a colonel. Tsyganov was shifted to the Military Administration Academy in September 1937, where he became a senior instructor. He rose to chief of the combined tactics and rear department at the academy in February 1939. Promoted to kombrig on 2 April 1940, Tsyganov received the rank of major general on 4 June when the Red Army introduced general officer ranks. He became chief of a department in February 1941 after the academy was renamed the Red Army Quartermaster Academy.

== World War II ==
After the German invasion began in June 1941, Tsyganov served as deputy chief of staff of the Southwestern Main Direction's rear services in August and September, before taking command of 38th Army during its unsuccessful defense of Kharkov in late September and October. Having served exclusively in staff and instruction roles during the interwar period, Tsyganov was an unlikely choice for high-level wartime field command. However, after his army helped halt the German advance in November, in the following month the STAVKA appointed him to command of Southern Front's 56th Army, which participated in that Front's successful winter counteroffensives. After assisting in driving the 1st Panzer Army out of Rostov-on-Don in early December and back to the Mius River, 56th Army spent the rest of the winter and spring of 1942 on the southernmost sector of Southern Front, right down to the coast of the Sea of Azov. At the start of the German summer offensive the Army consisted of two rifle brigades and three rifle divisions in the first echelon, backed by two more rifle brigades and a tank brigade with 55 tanks, plus two fortified regions manning fixed defenses in and around Rostov.

1st Panzer and 17th Armies began their attack on 7 July and by the 16th the Front commander, Lt. Gen. Rodion Malinovsky, was authorized by the STAVKA to order his armies to begin an orderly withdrawal to the Don River south of Rostov over five nights, protected by strong rearguards. Late on the 20th, LVII Panzer Corps had crossed the Mius and was driving the rearguards of 56th Army back towards the city. In the following days Tsyganov ordered his forces to defend Rostov by manning the outer and inner defensive belts on the northern and eastern sectors. These plans were undone by the rapid advance of the German tank forces and the premature withdrawal of 18th Army south of the Don. 56th Army was forced to withdraw as well, and after a bitter defense mainly by NKVD security troops Rostov-on-Don fell to the Germans for the second time on 27 July. Deemed by Stalin to be unfit for field command, Tsyganov was relieved a few days later.

Tsyganov was immediately reassigned to become deputy commander in chief for military schools in the Moscow Military District. On 16 October 1943, he was promoted to the rank of lieutenant general. He was still serving in the training establishment when he died of illness on 25 June 1944, at the age of 47. Tsyganov was buried at the Novodevichy Cemetery.

== Awards ==
Tsyganov was a recipient of the following decorations:

- Order of the Red Banner
- Order of the Patriotic War, 1st class
- Jubilee Medal "XX Years of the Workers' and Peasants' Red Army"
