= Romanovsky District =

Location of Altai Krai in Russia

Location of Saratov Oblast in Russia

Romanovsky District is the name of several administrative and municipal districts in Russia:

- Romanovsky District, Altai Krai, an administrative and municipal district of Altai Krai
- Romanovsky District, Saratov Oblast, an administrative and municipal district of Saratov Oblast

== See also ==
- Romanovsky (disambiguation)
