= Frunze Military Academy =

Military academy of the Russian Armed Forces

M. V. Frunze Military Academy
- Военная академия имени М. В. Фрунзе
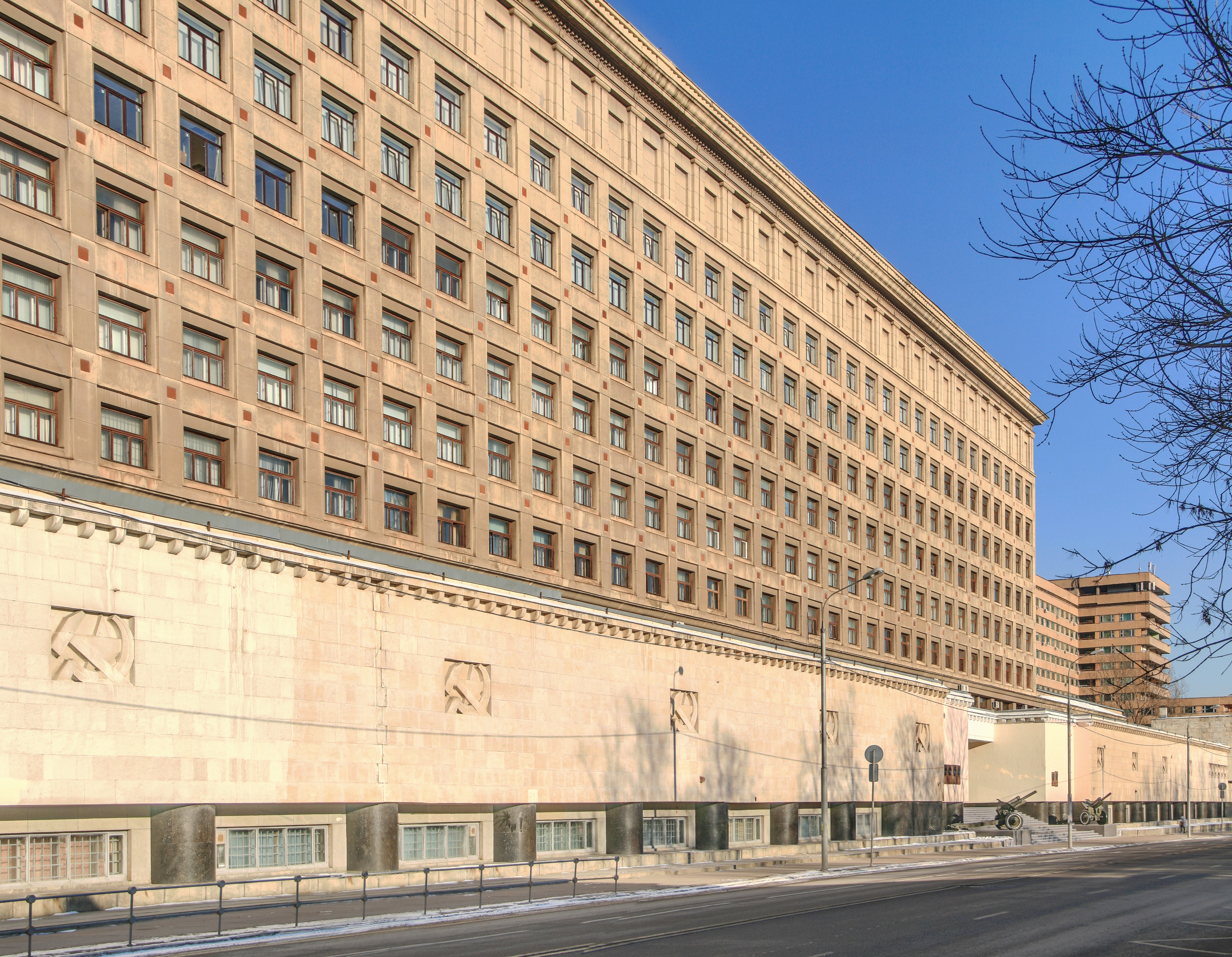
- Type: Military academy
- Active: 1918–1998
- Location: 4 Devichego Polya Drive, Moscow, Russia; 55°44′17″N 37°34′40″E

The M. V. Frunze Military Academy (Russian: Военная академия имени М. В. Фрунзе), or in full the Military Order of Lenin and the October Revolution, Red Banner, Order of Suvorov Academy in the name of M. V. Frunze (Russian: Военная орденов Ленина и Октябрьской Революции, Краснознамённая, ордена Суворова академия имени М. В. Фрунзе), was a military academy of the Soviet and later the Russian Armed Forces.

Established in 1918 to train officers for the newly formed Red Army, the academy was one of the most prestigious military educational institutions in the Soviet Union. At first titled the General Staff Academy of the Red Army, taking on a similar role to its pre-revolutionary predecessor, the Imperial Nicholas Military Academy, it was renamed the Military Academy in 1921 and then the M. V. Frunze Military Academy in 1925, honouring Mikhail Frunze, who had been a commandant of the academy.

It became a higher staff college with the addition of courses for senior command officers in the 1930s, before these were transferred in 1936 to the newly formed Military Academy of the General Staff. By this time many of the Red Army's most senior commanders were graduates of the academy. During the Second World War, large numbers of staff and students were called up to fight. Many won decorations and awards, including 244 Heroes of the Soviet Union, and 18 twice Heroes of the Soviet Union. Training and research at the academy continued throughout the war.

The academy continued to train senior officers for the Soviet Armed Forces after the war, acting as a stepping stone for those tipped for high command before they attended the Military Academy of the General Staff. It was ranked as the most prestigious of all the Soviet military academies, taking officers ranked captain or above for a three-year course of study to prepare them for higher commands. The academy also offered research and postgraduate degrees in various aspects of military studies. Between 1934 and 1988, 722 graduates of the academy were awarded the title of Hero of the Soviet Union, while the academy received the Order of Lenin, the Order of Suvorov First Class, and the Order of the October Revolution.

The academy continued to operate after the dissolution of the Soviet Union in 1991. In 1998 it was merged with the Malinovsky Military Armoured Forces Academy and the Vystrel officer training courses to form the Combined Arms Academy of the Armed Forces of the Russian Federation.

== History ==
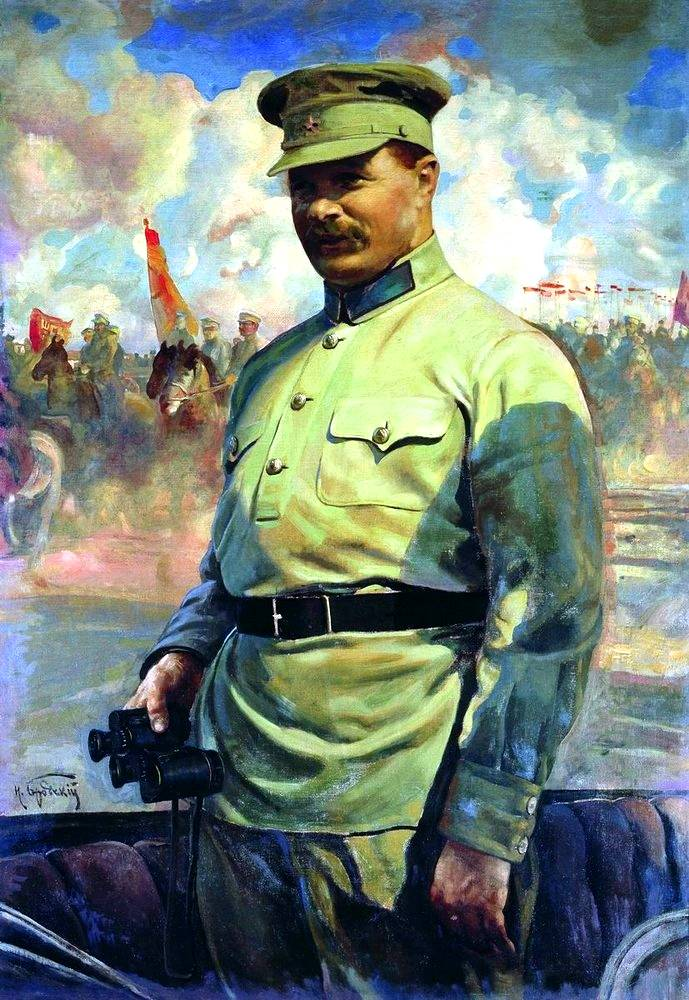
Mikhail Frunze, a posthumous 1929 portrait by Isaak Brodsky. Commandant of the academy between 1924 and 1925, and subsequently its namesake.

Establishing an academy for the training of command and staff officers was an Imperial-era innovation, carried out at the Imperial Nicholas Military Academy. With the outbreak of the First World War, classes at the academy ceased. Special wartime courses for staff officers were briefly instituted from 30 October 1916 on the initiative of General Mikhail Alekseyev, but closed in late April 1917.

The early battles of the Red Army during the first stages of the Russian Civil War demonstrated that battlefield commands could not be given to former workers and soldiers who had little experience with tactics or with leading men. On 7 October 1918 the Revolutionary Military Council ordered the foundation of the General Staff Academy of the Red Army, based in Moscow and taking on the functions of the Imperial-era General Staff Academy. The first intake of students, who joined on 25 November that year, numbered 183, with the official opening of the academy taking place on 8 December 1918.

It was renamed the Military Academy of the Red Army on 5 August 1921. Several years later on 5 November 1925, it was renamed as the M. V. Frunze Military Academy honouring Mikhail Frunze. He had commanded the academy between 19 April 1924 and his death on 31 October 1925.

Higher courses were added in 1921 and expanded in 1925 to become the courses known as KUVNAS to provide advanced training in military science for earlier graduates. These courses became the basis for the Military Academy of the General Staff, which was split from the Frunze Military Academy in 1936. On 18 January 1934 the academy was awarded the Order of Lenin, and became known as the Red Banner Order of Lenin Military Academy named after M.V. Frunze.

From 1922 the academy had occupied a location on Prechistenka Street, in the expropriated Dolgorukov Palace. A new building was designed by Lev Rudnev, with the academy moving into it in August 1937. Training for that semester began on 1 September. The academy, in common with many other Soviet institutions of military education, suffered during the Great Purges of the late 1930s. The commandant and many of the senior department heads and professors were arrested and executed with little justice. By 1941 more than 7,500 personnel had graduated from the academy.

=== Wartime ===
Following the Axis invasion of the Soviet Union in June 1941, many of the academy's students and teachers were posted to active roles. Between June and July 1941, 43 generals and 167 senior officers were dispatched to the front from the academy, many of them taking up high positions in the Soviet defence effort. Four were appointed regimental commanders, eleven as infantry brigade commanders and chiefs of staff, forty-two as divisional chiefs of staff, twenty-one as division commanders, six as corps commanders and chiefs of staff, twenty-two to army headquarters, and forty-four to front headquarters. Those who remained at the academy were soon occupied in preparing defensive lines and fortifications around Moscow, and in training militia units.

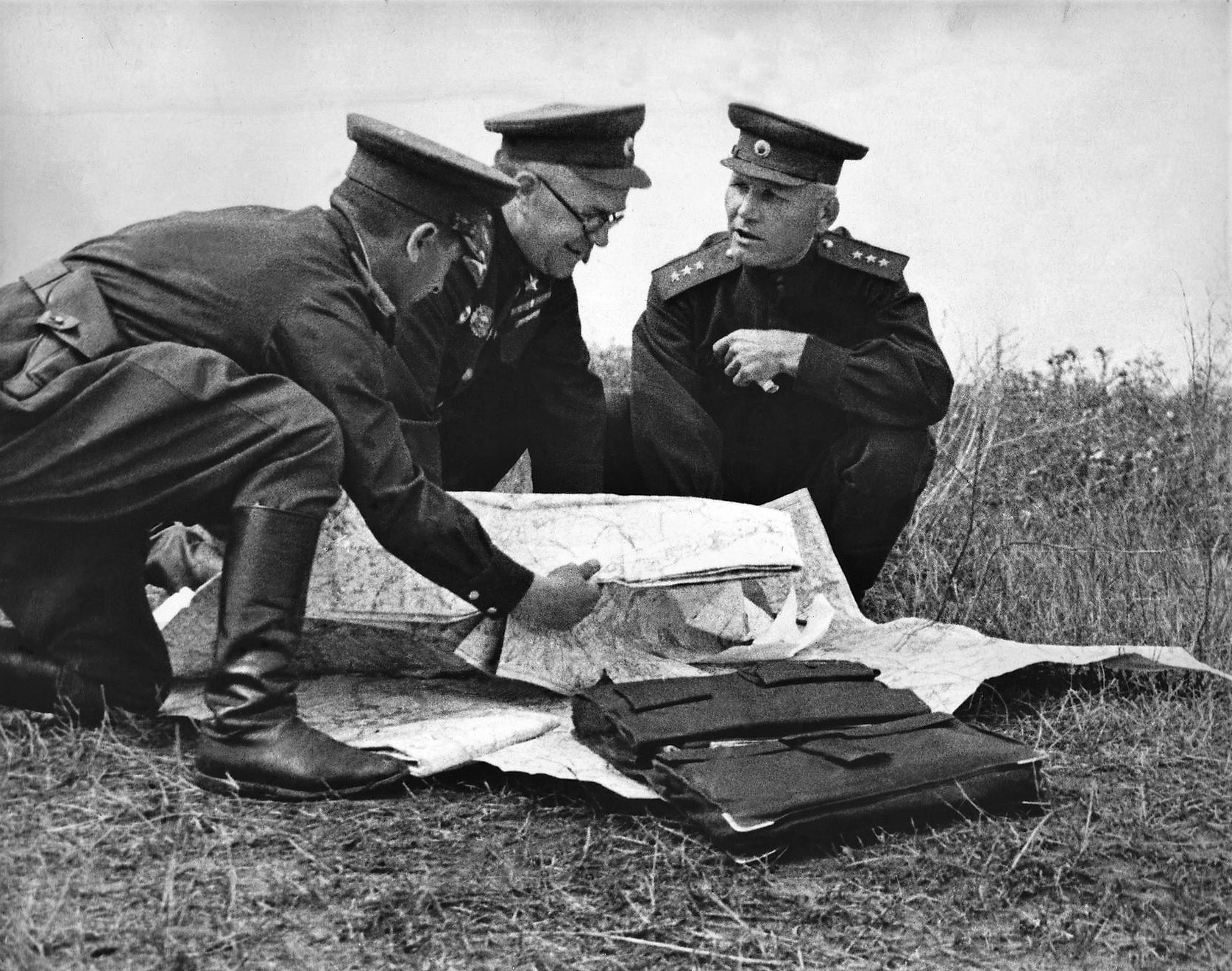
Georgy Zhukov and Ivan Konev in 1943, both graduates of the academy

Training efforts continued during the war, with a shortened programme for command officers to link the regiment and division levels, and from 1944 onwards, for division and corps levels. To meet shortages in personnel, those who had a secondary education and qualified as junior lieutenants were also enrolled. As the war progressed, by 1944 training was also provided for combined-arms officers in division and corps units.

Scientific research work continued throughout the war, taking in experience gathered during combat operations and producing summaries of frontline combat activity, manuals on tactics, military geography, and the history of military art. On 21 February 1945 the academy was awarded the Order of Suvorov First Class by the Presidium of the Supreme Soviet of the USSR, and became the Red Banner Order of Lenin and Order of Suvorov First Class Military Academy named after M.V. Frunze.

=== Post war ===
After the war the academy continued to train combined-arms officers, establishing a faculty to incorporate tactical and strategic innovations developed during the Second World War, and subsequent advances in science and technology. With developments in nuclear weapons, the academy trained officers in the use of tank, motorized rifle units, aviation and artillery in a possible nuclear war. In 1978 it was awarded the Order of the October Revolution, becoming the Orders of Lenin and October Revolution, the Red Banner Order of Suvorov Military Academy named after M.V. Frunze. As of 1979, the Academy had 'chairs of operational-tactical disciplines such as Marxism-Leninism, the history of the CPSU and party-political work, as well as history of war and military art, foreign languages, and other subjects.

The academy continued to operate after the dissolution of the Soviet Union in 1991, training officers for the Russian Armed Forces. On 29 August 1998, in accordance with government decree No. 1009, the academy was combined with the Malinovsky Military Armoured Forces Academy and the Vystrel officer training courses to form the Combined Arms Academy of the Armed Forces of the Russian Federation.

== Education ==
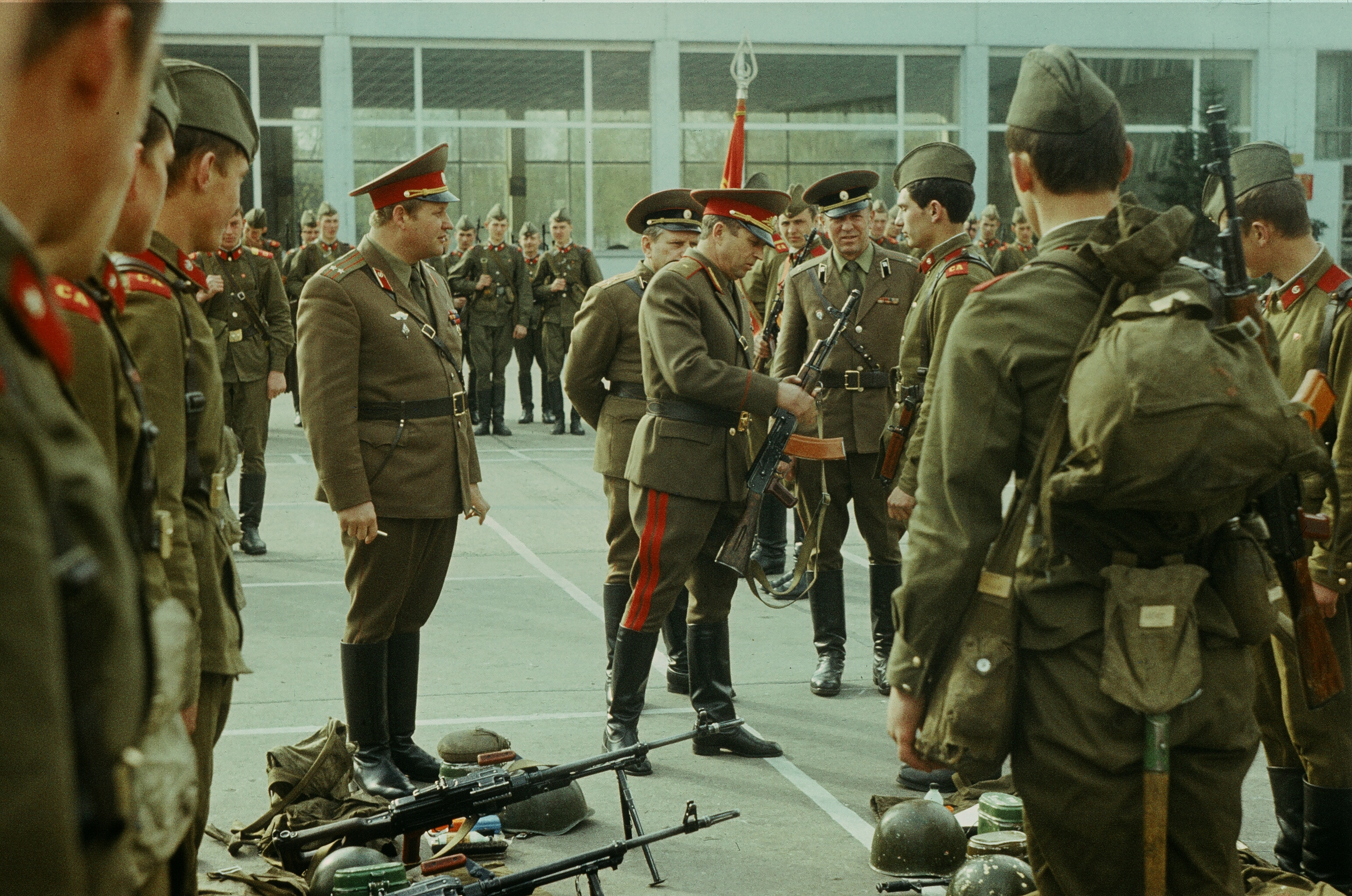
Soviet troops and officers in 1981. By the 1980s many of the higher-ranking officers in the Soviet Ground Forces were graduates of the academy

With the splitting of the higher strategic courses into the new Military Academy of the General Staff in 1936, the Frunze Military Academy concentrated on preparing officers for combined arms warfare. The majority of students were from the Soviet Ground Forces, though there were those from other services, particularly the Air Forces and Air Defence Forces. A late 1970s work recorded that a third of students had graduated from one of the country's Suvorov Military Schools.

Students generally entered for a three-year course of study, usually at the rank of captain. By the time they had finished their studies, graduates usually qualified for promotion to the rank of major. In addition to officers from the Soviet Union, students were also drawn from the armed forces of Warsaw Pact and other associated countries.

During the Soviet period the academy had departments on operational-tactical disciplines, Marxism–Leninism, the history of the Communist Party and its work, the history of war and military art, foreign languages, and others. Studies were supported by a library containing over two million volumes. The academy was also an important centre for military scientific research, offering postgraduate and research programmes leading to the award of candidate or doctoral degrees. By the late 1970s it was considered the most prestigious of the seventeen Soviet military academies.

Candidates attended the academy after having graduated from one of the higher military training colleges and spent some time on active service. Having graduated from the academy, and subsequently attained the rank of colonel or similar, the most capable candidates were then considered for entry to the General Staff Academy, and so to the highest ranks and echelons of the Soviet military.

== Faculty ==
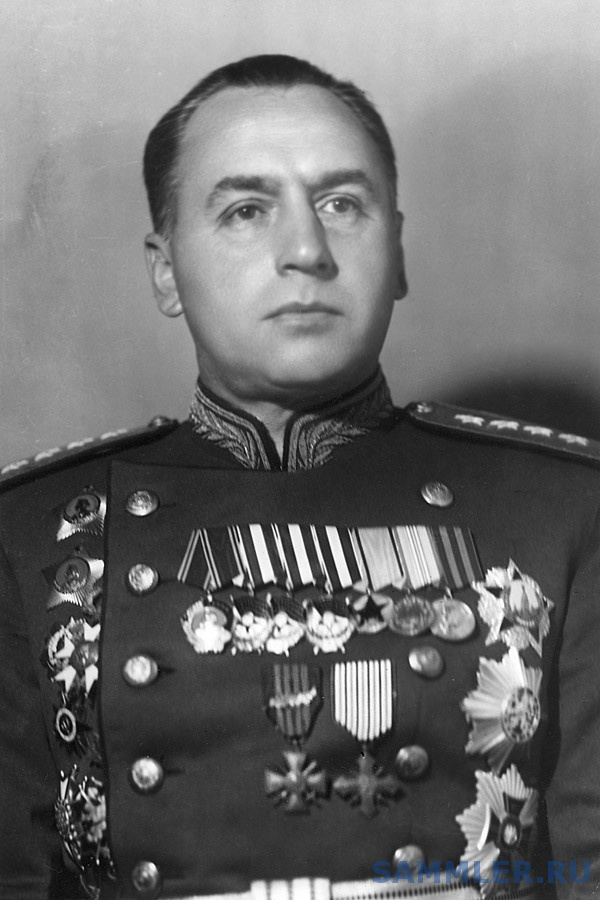
Aleksei Antonov, one of a number of academy graduates who returned to take up teaching posts

Teaching faculty at the academy often held senior military ranks alongside higher academic qualifications. The commandant of the academy usually held a general's rank. By the late 1970s between twenty-five and fifty general officers were teaching at the academy. Among the early military commanders who taught at the academy was Aleksei Antonov, who was a student at the academy between 1928 and 1931, and returned in December 1938 as a lecturer in the general tactics faculty, becoming a senior lecturer in February 1940 and deputy head of the faculty in January 1941.

== Graduates ==
A number of the first academy graduates went on to high ranks, among whom were future marshals of the Soviet Union Nikolay Voronov, Kirill Meretskov, Vasily Sokolovsky and Vasily Chapayev. During the Second World War a total of twenty-four academy graduates had commands of either fronts or armies. Among them were marshals Georgy Zhukov, Leonid Govorov, Ivan Konev, Rodion Malinovsky, Kirill Meretskov, Fyodor Tolbukhin, Konstantin Rokossovsky, army generals Andrey Yeryomenko, Ivan Bagramyan, and generals Hamazasp Babadzhanian, Pavel Batitsky, Pavel Belov, Vladimir Kirpichnikov, Pavel Batov, Afanasy Beloborodov, Alexander Gorbatov, Mikhail Yefremov, Lev Dovator, Pyotr Koshevoy, David Dragunsky, Alexander Lizyukov, Issa Pliyev and Vasily Chuikov, among others.

During the Second World War 244 academy graduates received the title of Hero of the Soviet Union, with a further 18 being awarded the title twice. Between 1934 and 1988, 722 graduates of the academy were awarded the title of Hero of the Soviet Union.

== Heads ==
The first head of the academy was Anton Klimovich, a major general and division commander, who had served in the Russo-Japanese War and World War I.

- Anton Klimovich (1918–1919)
- Andrei Snesarev (1919–1921)
- Mikhail Tukhachevsky (1921–1922)
- Anatoly Gekker (1922)
- Pavel Lebedev (1922–1924)
- Mikhail Frunze (1924–1925)
- Roberts Eidemanis (1925–1932)
- Boris Shaposhnikov (1932–1935)
- August Kork (1935–1937)
- Nikolay Veryovkin-Rakhalsky (1937–1939)
- Mikhail Khozin (1939–1941)
- Nikolay Veryovkin-Rakhalsky (1941–1944)
- Nikandr Chibisov (1944–1948)
- Vyacheslav Tsvetayev (1948–1950)
- Aleksey Zhadov (1950–1954)
- Pavel Kurochkin (1954–1968)
- Andrei Stuchenko (1968–1969)
- Alexei Radzievsky (1969–1978)
- Pavel Melnikov (1978–1982)
- Gennady Obaturov (1982–1985)
- Vladimir Konchits (1985–1991)
- Vladimir Lobov (1991)
- Fyodor Kuzmin (1992–1997)
- Leonid Zolotov (1997–1998)
