= Romanovskoye, Vladimir Oblast =

Romanovskoye Романовское
- Selo
- Location within Vladimir Oblast Location within Russia
- Coordinates: 56°17′N 38°51′E
- Country: Russia
- Region: Vladimir Oblast
- District: Alexandrovsky District
- Time zone: UTC+3:00

Romanovskoye (Russian: Романовское) is a rural locality (a selo) in Karinskoye Rural Settlement, Alexandrovsky District, Vladimir Oblast, Russia. The population was 53 as of 2010. There are two streets.

== Geography ==
Romanovskoye is located on the Maly Kirzhach River, 21 km southeast of Alexandrov (the district's administrative centre) by road. Dubki is the nearest rural locality.
