= Volgodonskoy District =

Volgodonskoy District Волгодонской район (Russian)
- District
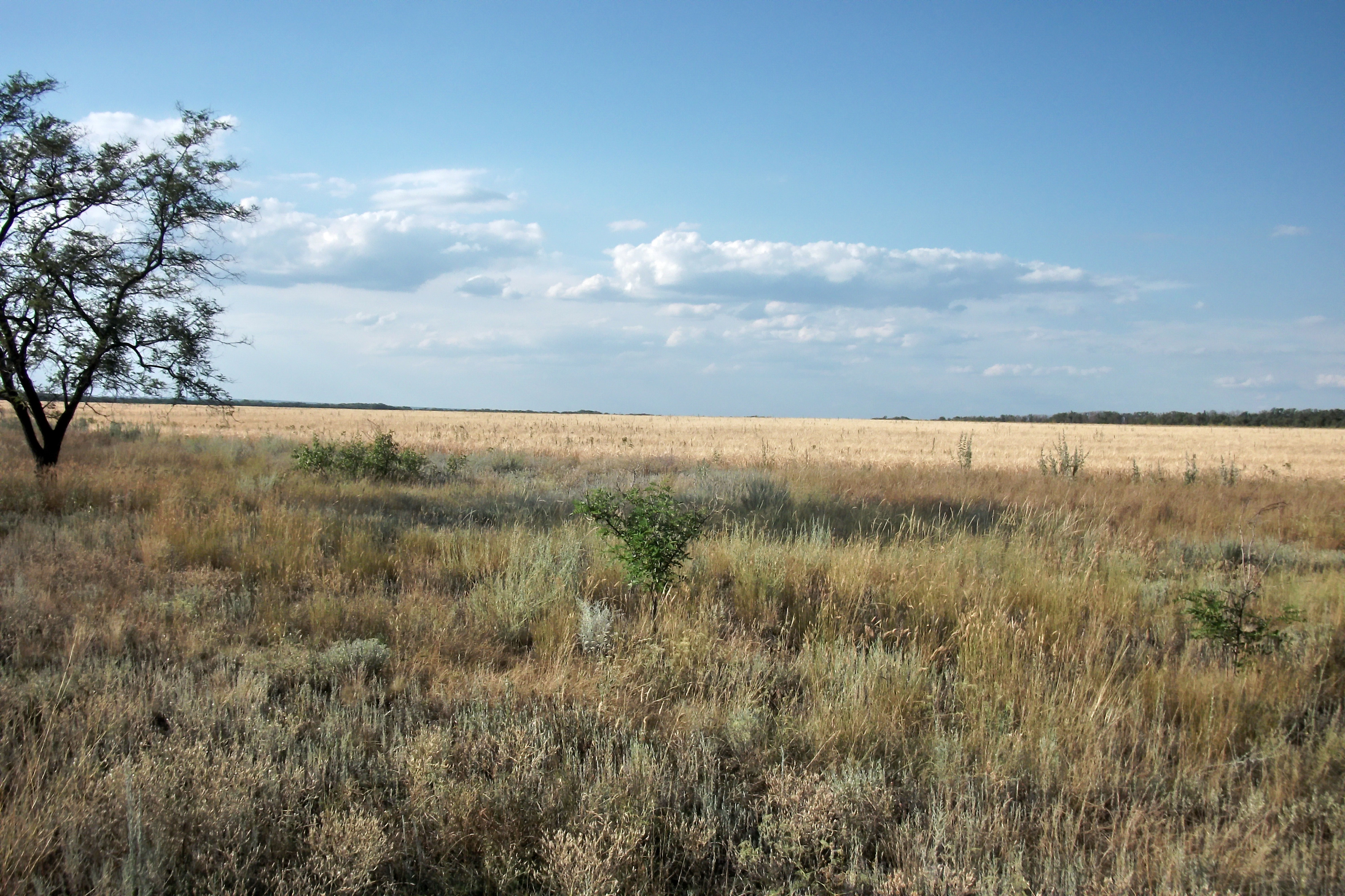
- Landscape in Volgodonsky District

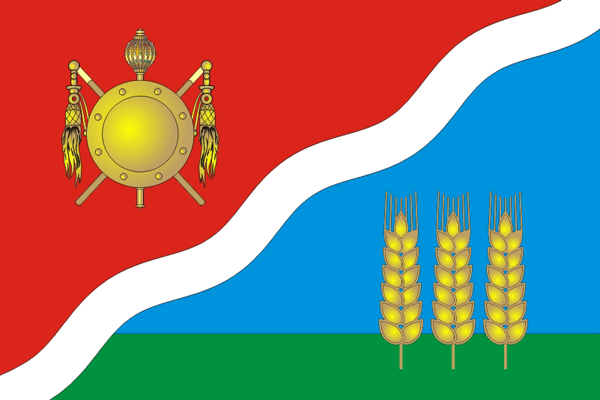
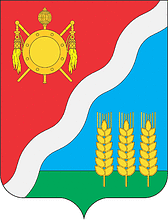
- Flag Coat of arms
- Location of Volgodonskoy District in Rostov Oblast
- Coordinates: 47°32′36″N 42°01′39″E
- Country: Russia
- Federal subject: Rostov Oblast
- Established: 1983
- Administrative center: Romanovskaya

Area
  - Total: 1,479 km^{2} (571 sq mi)

Population (2010 Census)
  - Total: 33,779
  - Density: 22.84/km^{2} (59.15/sq mi)
  - Urban: 0%
  - Rural: 100%

Administrative structure
  - Administrative divisions: 7 rural settlement
  - Inhabited localities: 33 rural localities

Municipal structure
  - Municipally incorporated as: Volgodonskoy Municipal District
  - Municipal divisions: 0 urban settlements, 7 rural settlements
- Time zone: UTC+3 (MSK)
- OKTMO ID: 60612000
- Website: http://volgodonskoiraion.ru/

Volgodonskoy District (Russian: Волгодонско́й райо́н) is an administrative and municipal district (raion), one of the forty-three in Rostov Oblast, Russia. It is located in the eastern central part of the oblast. The area of the district is 1,479 square kilometers (571 sq mi). Its administrative center is the rural locality (a stanitsa) of Romanovskaya. Population: 33,779 (2010 Census); 30,170 (2002 census); 24,690 (1989 Soviet census). The population of Romanovskaya accounts for 24.4% of the district's total population.

== Notable residents ==
- Nikandr Chibisov (1892–1959), Soviet military commander and Hero of the Soviet Union, born in the stanitsa of Romanovskaya
- Yefim Trotsenko (1901–1972), Soviet military leader, born in Yegorov
