= Nikolay Veryovkin-Rakhalsky =

Nikolay Andreevich Veryovkin-Rakhalsky
- Born: 1893 Bilenke, Yekaterinoslav Governorate, Russian Empire
- Died: 1984 (aged 90–91) Moscow, Russian SFSR, Soviet Union
- Allegiance: Russian Empire; Soviet Union
- Branch: Imperial Russian Army; Soviet Red Army
- Conflicts: World War I Russian Civil War; Basmachi Revolt; World War II

Nikolay Andreevich Veryovkin-Rakhalsky (10 February 1893–1984) was a Soviet general. He fought in the Imperial Russian Army during World War I before going over to the Bolsheviks in the subsequent civil war. He was promoted to Komkor (corps commander) in 1939. He was a recipient of the Order of Lenin, the Order of the Red Banner, the Order of Kutuzov, the Order of the Red Star, the Order of the October Revolution and the Order of Bogdan Khmelnitsky (Soviet Union). He was a member of the Communist Party of the Soviet Union. He retired in 1958 at the age of 65.

== Biography ==
Veryovkin-Rakhalsky was born on 10 February 1893 in the village of Bilenke, which was then part of the Yekaterinoslav Governorate in the Russian Empire (now in Zaporizhzhia Oblast, Ukraine). He was the son of a rural schoolteacher. His grandfather was a general who fought under Mikhail Skobelev during the Russian conquest of Central Asia.
