= Romanovskaya, Rostov Oblast =

Romanovskaya Романовская
- Stanitsa
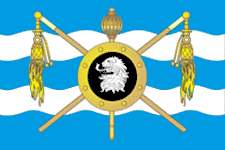
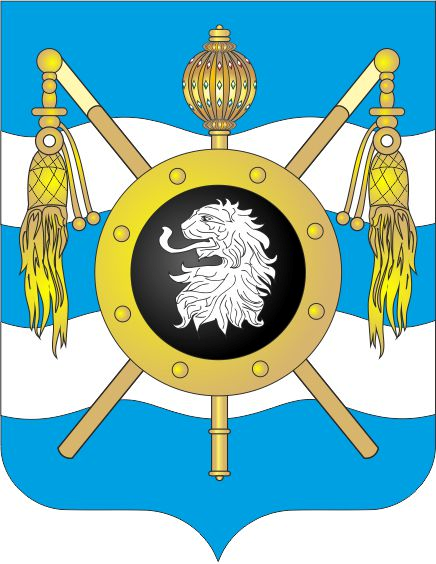
- Flag Coat of arms
- Interactive map of Romanovskaya
- Location of Romanovskaya Romanovskaya (Rostov Oblast)
- Coordinates: 47°32′36″N 42°01′39″E
- Country: Russia
- Federal subject: Rostov Oblast
- Administrative district: Volgodonskoy District
- Founded: 1672

Population (2010 Census)
  - Total: 8,248
  - Estimate (2010): 8,248 (0%)
- Time zone: UTC+3 (MSK)
- Postal code: 347350
- OKTMO ID: 60612432101

Romanovskaya (Russian: Романовская) is a rural locality (a stanitsa) in Volgodonskoy District of Rostov Oblast, Russia. Population: 8,248 (2010 census); 6,896 (2002 census). It is also the administrative center of Volgodonskoy District.

== History ==
Romanovskaya was first mentioned in official documents in 1613. It is believed that it was named after the first Tsar among Romanov House, Mikhail Feodorovich. Initially, the village was located on the right bank of the Don River. For almost two centuries, it had been moved several times from the right bank to the left, as the Don changed its flow and due to the raids of Tatars and Caucasian Highlanders.

Since 1840 it has been situated on the left bank. By the beginning of the 20th century there were 525 cossack and 151 peasant households, a church and two parochial schools.

During the period of general land surveying of Russia in 1888, the stanitsa of Romanovskaya was designated along with Tsimlyanskaya to the 1st Don district, with the district center in the stanitsa of Konstantinovskaya. In 1963, with the consolidation of rural areas and cities in the region, Romanovsky District, which had existed since 1937 and in 1957 was renamed Volgodonskoy, became part of Tsimlyansky District. Romanovskaya stanitsa became the administrative center of Volgodonskoy District, newly formed on May 10, 1983, at the expense of part of the territory of Tsimlyansky District.

== Landmarks ==
- Monument to Saints Peter and Fevronia.
- Church of Michael the Archangel, built in 2010.
