= Soviet destroyer Boyevoy (1984) =

Sovremenny-class destroyer of the Soviet Navy

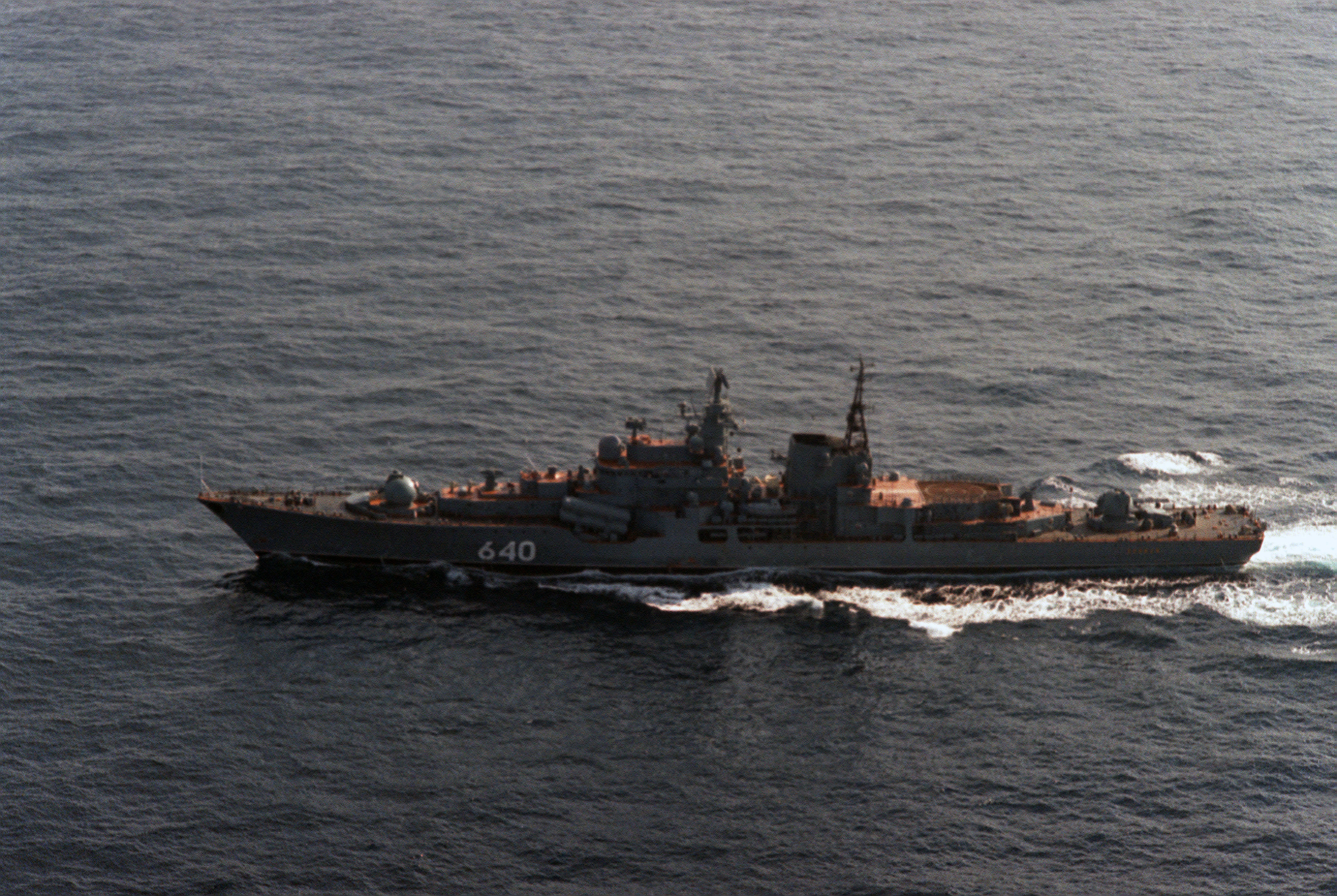
- Boyevoy underway in 1987

History

Soviet Union → Russia
- Name: Boyevoy; (Боевой)
- Namesake: Militant in Russian
- Builder: Zhdanov Shipyard, Leningrad
- Laid down: 26 March 1982
- Launched: 4 August 1984
- Commissioned: 5 November 1986
- Decommissioned: 1998
- Home port: Vladivostok
- Identification: Pennant number: 554, 640, 678, 720, 728, 770
- Status: Undergoing scrap

General characteristics
- Class & type: Sovremenny-class destroyer
- Displacement: 6,600 tons standard, 8,480 tons full load
- Length: 156 m (511 ft 10 in)
- Beam: 17.3 m (56 ft 9 in)
- Draught: 6.5 m (21 ft 4 in)
- Propulsion: 2 shaft steam turbines, 4 boilers, 75,000 kW (100,000 hp), 2 fixed propellers, 2 turbo generators, and 2 diesel generators
- Speed: 32.7 knots (60.6 km/h; 37.6 mph)
- Range: 3,920 nmi (7,260 km; 4,510 mi) at 18 knots (33 km/h; 21 mph); 1,345 nmi (2,491 km; 1,548 mi) at 33 knots (61 km/h; 38 mph)
- Complement: 350
- Sensors & processing systems: Radar: Air target acquisition radar, 3 × navigation radars, 130 mm gun fire-control radars, 30 mm air-defence gun fire control radar; Sonar: Active and passive under-keel sonar; ES: Tactical situation plotting board, anti-ship missile fire control system, air defence, missile fire-control system, and torpedo fire control system
- Electronic warfare & decoys: 2 PK-2 decoy dispensers (200 rockets)
- Armament: Guns: 2 × twin AK-130 130 mm (5 in) naval guns; 4 × 30 mm (1.2 in) AK-630 CIWS; Missiles; 2 × quad (SS-N-22 'Sunburn') anti-ship missiles; 2 × 24 SA-N-7 'Gadfly' surface-to-air missiles; Anti-submarine: 2 × twin 533 mm (21 in) torpedo tubes; 2 × 6 RBU-1000 300 mm (12 in) anti-submarine rocket launchers
- Aircraft carried: 1× Ka-27 helicopter
- Aviation facilities: Helipad

Boyevoy was a Sovremenny-class destroyer of the Soviet and later Russian navy.

== Development and design ==
The project began in the late 1960s when it was becoming obvious in the Soviet Navy that naval guns still had an important role particularly in support of amphibious landings, but existing gun cruisers and destroyers were showing their age. A new design was started, employing a new 130-millimetre (5 in) automatic gun turret.

The Sovremenny-class ships were 156 metres (512 ft) in length, with a beam of 17.3 metres (56 ft 9 in) and a draught of 6.5 metres (21 ft 4 in).

== Construction and career ==
Boyevoy was laid down on 26 March 1982 and launched on 4 August 1984 by Zhdanov Shipyard in Leningrad. She was commissioned on 5 November 1986.

On 28 November 1987 in the Indian Ocean, she met with a detachment of warships. From 29 November to 3 December, under the flag of Rear Admiral V.I. Darnopykh, she paid a visit to Bombay, India and then on 11 December passed through the Malacca Strait. From 14 to 16 December she entered the naval base at Cam Ranh, Vietnam and on the evening of 22 December, together with the destroyers Marshal Shaposhnikov and Admiral Zakharov arrived in Vladivostok. From 12 to 16 May 1988, together with the icebreaker Novorossiysk and Admiral Zakharov under the flag of Admiral G.А. Khvatova, paid a visit to the port of Wonsan, North Korea. In the port of Wonsan, Boyevoy was visited by the commander of the North Korean Navy.

From 4 April 1989, she carried out combat service in the Persian Gulf, performing reconnaissance and escorting tasks. From 14 to 18 August, she was in Madras, India and later in the South China Sea she carried out tracking of a multi-purpose aircraft carrier group of the United States Navy. In a storm, she saved 50 Vietnamese from the junks and brought them to Cam Ranh. On 23 September she returned to Vladivostok. From April to September she had covered 16,876.6 nautical miles (31,255.5 km; 19,421.2 mi). The ship's combat service was excellent. At the end of 1989, the ship received the Navy Main Committee Prize for artillery fire and took first place among the surface ships of the Pacific Fleet, declared the best ship in preparation for protection against weapons of mass destruction, the crew was awarded the Challenging Red Banner of the Pacific Fleet Military Council.

On 12 July 1990, as part of a detachment of warships, she went out to sea, on 16–18 July she entered Petropavlovsk-Kamchatsky, from 31 July to 4 August, together with the destroyer Admiral Vinogradov and the tanker Argun under the flag of Admiral G. Khvatov, made a goodwill visit to the naval base of San Diego, United States. During the visit, 49,000 Americans visited the ships. On 18 August 1990, she entered Petropavlovsk-Kamchatsky, on 22 August, arrived in Vladivostok. During the cruise, she covered 12,100 nmi (22,400 km; 13,900 mi) with five underway replenishments. In the year 1991, the ship traveled 4,730 nmi (8,760 km; 5,440 mi). From 15 October 1992 to 30 August 1993, repairs were carried out at SRZ No. 178.

In 1994, she won first place in the Navy in missile training. Docking took place in October-December 1994. In August 1995, as part of the ship's strike group with the destroyer Bezofaznenny, she won the Navy Commander's Prize for missile training and the prize for the search for submarines. In 1996, with faulty boilers, she went out to sea as part of a ship's strike group, winning the Navy Commander's Prize for missile training.

Since 1998, the vessel has been withdrawn to the reserve due to lack of funds to replace pipes in the main boilers. In June 2020, during the disposal, she sank, polluting the water area, a month later the ship was raised.
