= Chabanenko =

- Andrei Chabanenko
- Ivan Chabanenko (1900–1972), Soviet Ukrainian actor, stage director, professor, and rector of the Kiev Institute of Theatre Arts
- Viktor Chabanenko (1937–201), Ukrainian linguist, lexicographer, folklorist
