= Russian destroyer Marshal Vasilyevsky =

Udaloy-class destroyer of the Russian Navy

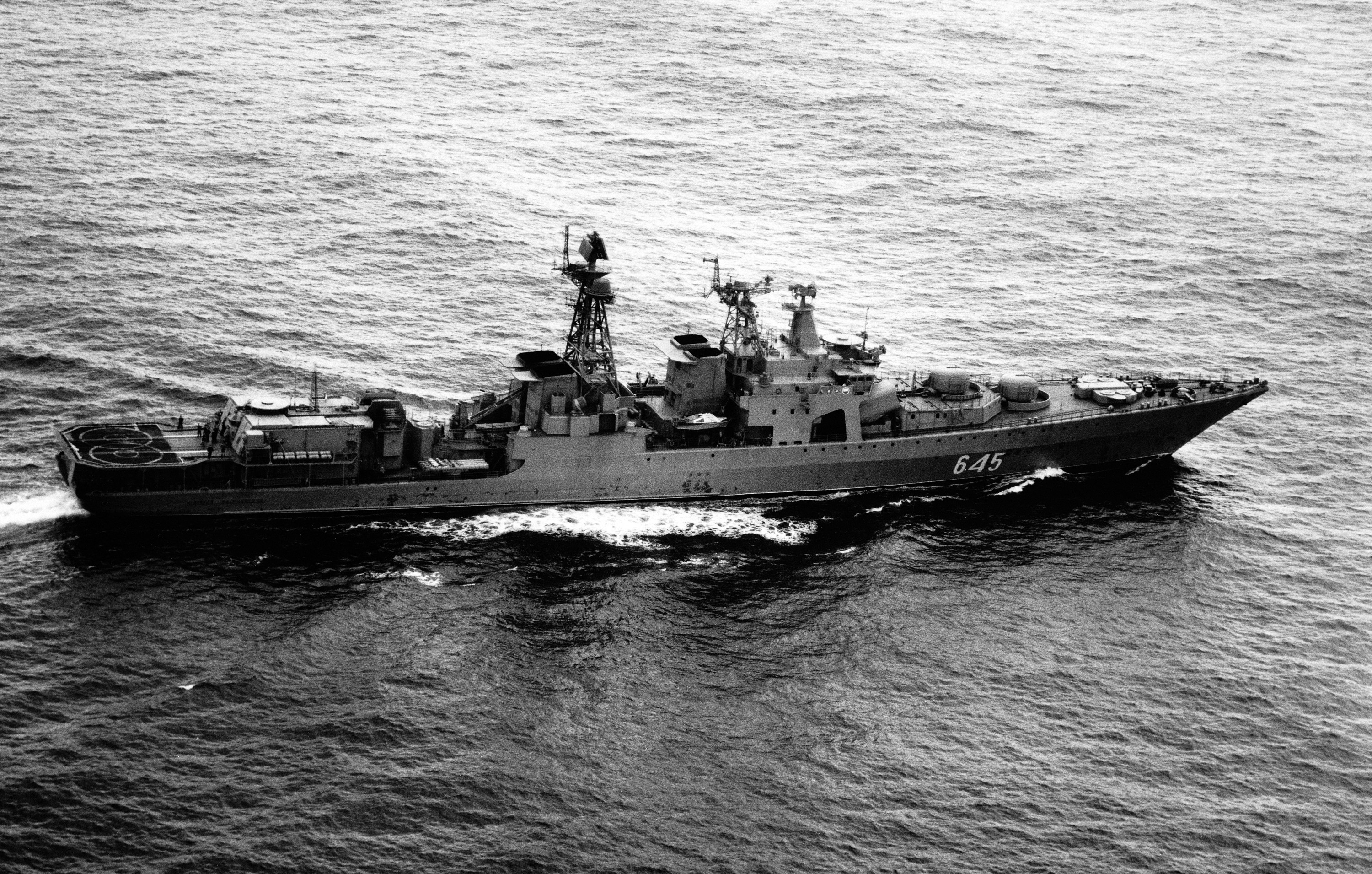
- Marshal Vasilevsky in 1986

History

Russia
- Name: Marshal Vasilevsky; (Маршал Василевский)
- Namesake: Aleksandr Vasilevsky
- Builder: Severnaya Verf, Leningrad
- Laid down: 22 April 1979
- Launched: 29 December 1981
- Commissioned: 8 December 1983
- Decommissioned: 2006
- Home port: Severomorsk
- Identification: Pennant number: 412, 630, 645, 687
- Fate: Scrapped

General characteristics
- Class & type: Udaloy-class destroyer 7,570 tons full load
- Length: 163 m (535 ft)
- Beam: 19.3 m (63 ft)
- Draught: 6.2 m (20 ft)
- Propulsion: 2 shaft COGAG, 2× D090 6.7 MW and 2× DT59 16.7 gas turbines, 120,000 hp 89.456 MW
- Speed: 35 kn (65 km/h; 40 mph)
- Range: 10,500 nmi (19,400 km; 12,100 mi) at 14 kn (26 km/h; 16 mph)
- Complement: 300
- Sensors & processing systems: Radar: MR-760MA Fregat-MA/Top Plate 3-D air search radar and MR-320M Topaz-V/Strut Pair air/surface search radar; Sonar: Horse Tail LF VDS sonar and Horse Jaw bow mounted LF sonar; Fire Control: 2 MR-360 Podkat/Cross Sword SA-N-9 SAM control, 2 3P37/Hot Flash SA-N-11 SAM control, Garpun-BAL SSM targeting
- Electronic warfare & decoys: Bell Squat jammer; Bell Shroud intercept; Bell Crown intercept; 2 × PK-2 decoy RL; 10 × PK-10 decoy RL in later ships
- Armament: 2 × 1 AK-100 100 mm naval guns; 8 (2 × 4) SS-N-14 'Silex' anti-submarine/anti-ship missiles; 64 (8 × 8) VLS cells for SA-N-9 'Gauntlet' surface-to-air missiles; 4 × 6 30 mm AK-630 CIWS; 2 × 1 21KM AA guns; 2 × 4 533 mm torpedo tubes for Type 53 or Type 65 torpedoes; 2 × 12 RBU-6000 anti-submarine rocket launchers
- Aircraft carried: 2 × Ka-27 series helicopters
- Aviation facilities: Helipad and hangar

Marshal Vasilevsky was a Udaloy-class destroyer of the Russian Navy.

== Development and design ==
Project 1155 dates to the 1970s when it was concluded that it was too costly to build large-displacement, multi-role combatants. The concept of a specialized surface ship was developed by Soviet designers.

They are 156m in length, 17.3m in beam and 6.5m in draught.

== Construction and career ==
Marshal Vasilevsky was laid down on 22 April 1979, and launched on 29 December 1981 by Severnaya Verf in Leningrad. She was commissioned on 8 December 1983. On December 12, 1983, the naval ensign was raised for the first time. January 18, 1984 she was included in the KSF.

In 1986, she conducted combat patrols in the Mediterranean Sea.

In the 1990s she was a member of the 10th Brigade of Large Anti-Submarine Ships of the Second Division of Anti-Submarine Ships of the Kola Flotilla of various forces of the Northern Fleet. Her military unit number was 31247.

From 1996 to 1998 she was based at berth 20 in Severomorsk and survived decommissioning of several other Udaloy class ships. At the end of 1997 the reduced crew of the Udaloy was transferred to the Marshal Vasilevsky. On account of nonfunctioning engines she was moored at the berth with a full ammunition load while in the city of Severomorsk.

The last time she went to sea was in April 1997. During this final sortie the ship's hydroacoustics recorded contact with a foreign submarine lasting 10 minutes. By order of the commander of the Kola flotilla, the ship's hydroacoustics team, which recorded the contact, received a bonus short-term vacation.

In 2004 the mountings of the AK-100 guns were dismantled and removed from the ship. They were installed on the Vice-Admiral Kulakov during her repair.

On December 11, 2006 (according to other sources, February 10, 2007), the naval flag was solemnly lowered on the ship and the crew was disbanded.

== Gallery ==
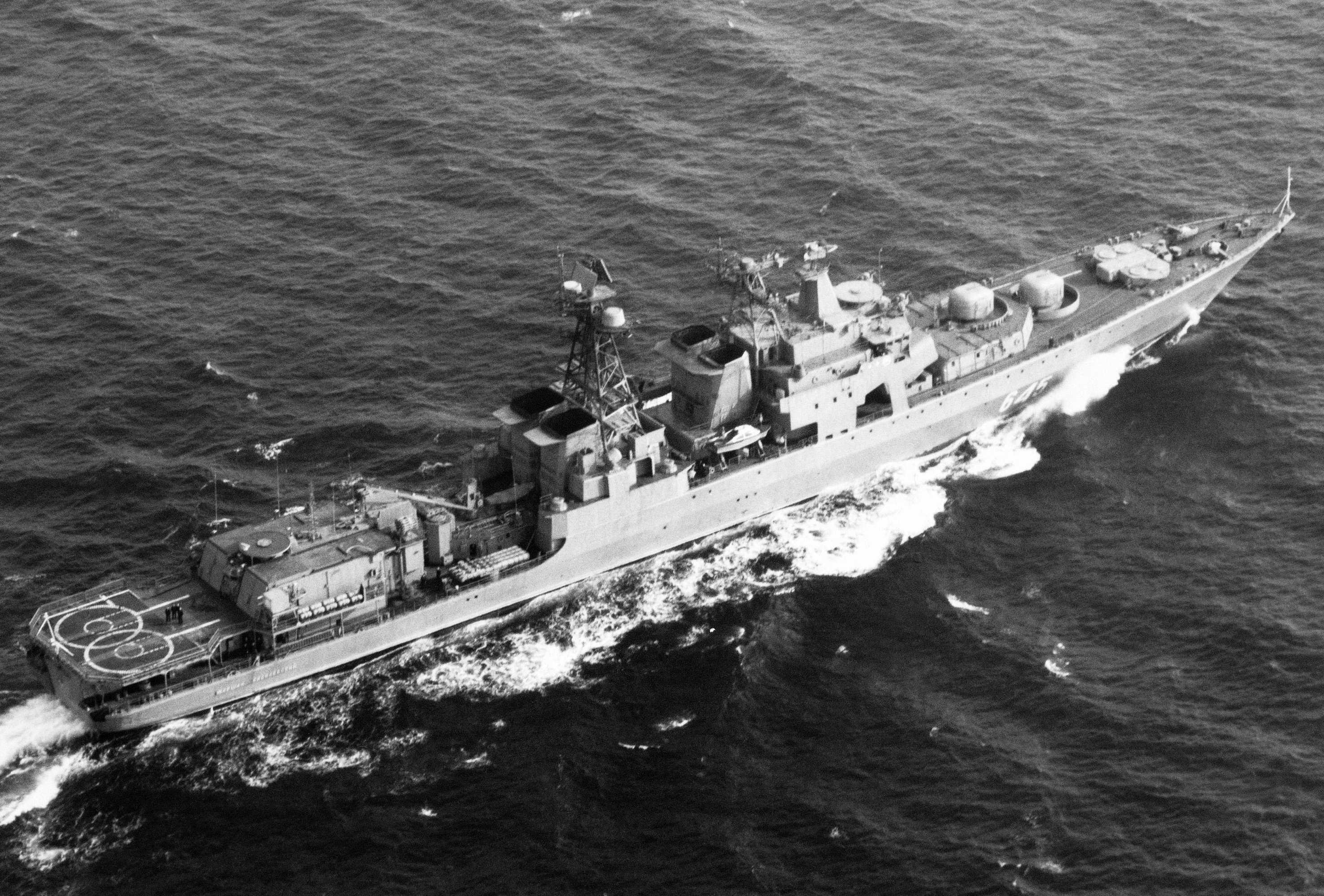
Marshal Vasilevsky in 1986.

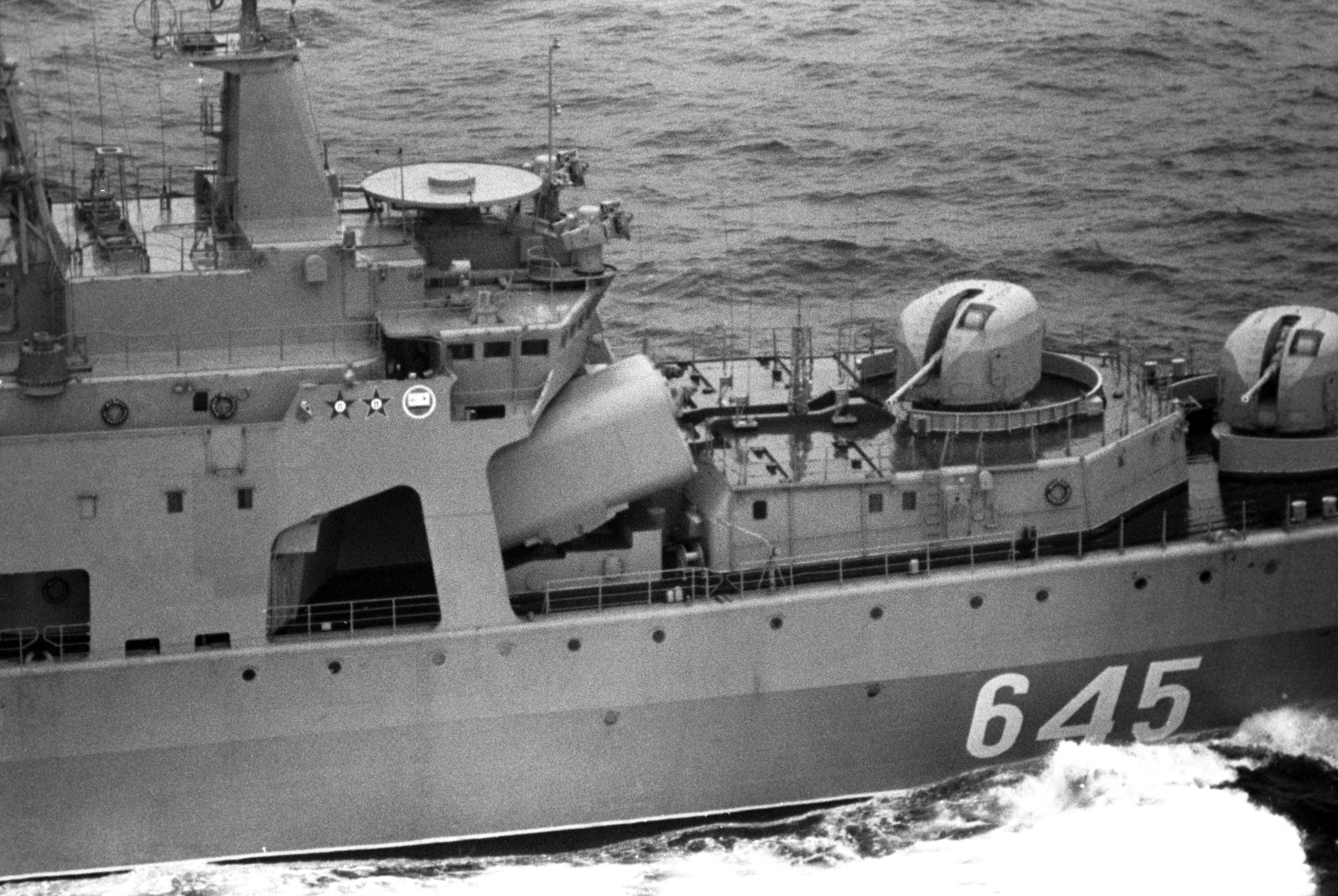
Marshal Vasilevsky in 1987.

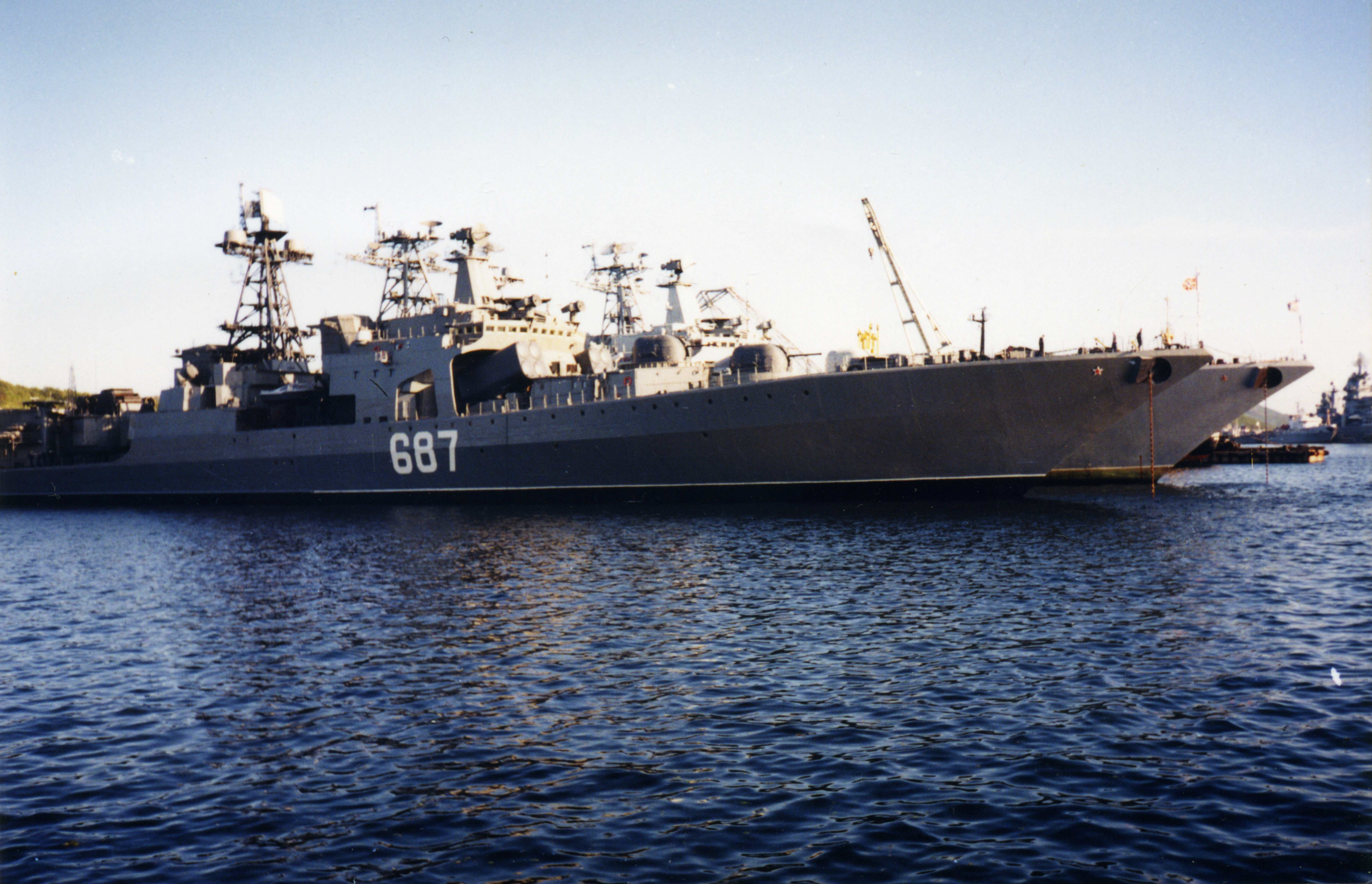
Marshal Vasilevsky in August 1997.
