= Udaloy-class destroyer =

1980s class of Soviet/Russian guided-missile anti-submarine destroyer

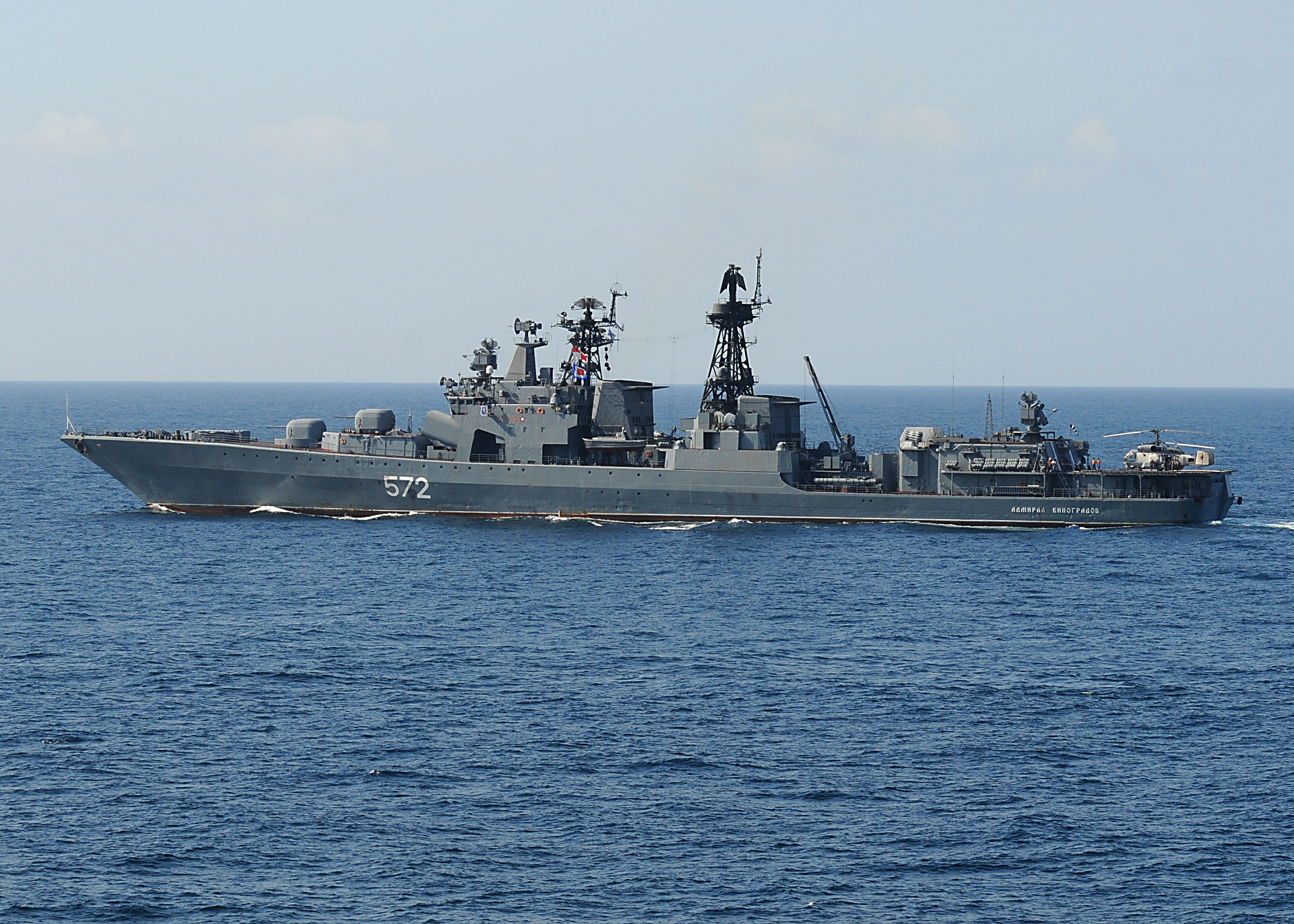
- Admiral Vinogradov underway

Class overview
- Name: Udaloy class
- Builders: Yantar Shipyard; Zhdanov Shipyard
- Operators: Soviet Navy; Russian Navy
- Preceded by: Sovremenny class
- Succeeded by: Lider class project (uncertain status)
- Built: 1977–1994
- In commission: 1980–present
- Planned: 15
- Completed: 13 (12 Udaloy I, 1 Udaloy II)
- Canceled: 2
- Active: 8
- Laid up: 1
- Retired: 5

General characteristics
- Type: Guided-missile destroyer
- Displacement: 6,930 tons standard; 7,570 tons full load
- Length: 163 m (535 ft)
- Beam: 19.3 m (63 ft)
- Draught: 6.2 m (20 ft)
- Propulsion: 2-shaft COGAG, 2 × D090 6.7 MW and 2 × DT59 16.7 gas turbines, 120,000 hp (89 MW)
- Speed: In excess of 28 knots (52 km/h; 32 mph)
- Range: 10,500 nmi (19,400 km; 12,100 mi) at 14 kn (26 km/h; 16 mph)
- Complement: 300
- Sensors & processing systems: Radar: MR-760MA Fregat-MA/Top Plate 3-D air search radar and MR-320M Topaz-V/Strut Pair air/surface search radar; Sonar: Horse Tail LF VDS sonar and Horse Jaw bow mounted LF sonar; Fire control: 2 × MR-360 Podkat/Cross Sword SA-N-9 SAM control, 2 × 3P37/Hot Flash SA-N-11 SAM control, Garpun-BAL SSM targeting
- Electronic warfare & decoys: Bell Squat jammer; Bell Shroud intercept; Bell Crown intercept; 2 × PK-2 decoy RL; 10 × PK-10 decoy RL in later ships
- Armament: Udaloy I: 2 × 1 AK-100 100 mm naval guns; 8 (2 × 4) SS-N-14 'Silex' anti-submarine/anti-ship missiles; 64 (8 × 8) VLS cells for SA-N-9 'Gauntlet' surface-to-air missiles; 4 × 6 30 mm AK-630 CIWS; 2 × 1 21KM AA guns; 2 × 4 533 mm torpedo tubes for Type 53 torpedoes; 2 × 12 RBU-6000 anti-submarine rocket launchers; Udaloy II: 1 × 2 AK-130 130 mm naval guns; 8 (2 × 4) SS-N-22 'Sunburn' anti-ship missiles; 64 (8 × 8) VLS cells for SA-N-9 'Gauntlet' surface-to-air missiles; 2 × Kashtan CIWS; 2 × 4 553 mm torpedo tubes for SS-N-16 'Stallion' anti-submarine missiles; 2 × 10 RBU-12000 anti-submarine rocket launchers
- Aircraft carried: 2 × Ka-27 series helicopters
- Aviation facilities: Helipad and hangar

The Udaloy class, Soviet designation Project 1155 Fregat and Russian designation Project 11551 Fregat-M (Russian: Фрегат, 'Fregat' - the family of seabird), are series of anti-submarine guided-missile destroyers built for the Soviet Navy, seven of which are currently in service with the Russian Navy. Twelve ships were built between 1980 and 1990, while the thirteenth ship built to a modified design, known as Udaloy II class, followed in 1999. They complement the Sovremenny-class destroyers in anti-aircraft and anti-surface warfare operations. The codename Udaloy comes from a Russian adjective удалой, meaning daring or bold. It is the last active destroyer class of the Russian Navy.

== History ==
The Project 1155 dates to the 1970s when it was concluded that it was too costly to build large-displacement, multi-role combatants. The concept of a specialized surface ship was developed by Soviet designers. Two different types of warships were laid down, which were designed by the Severnoye Design Bureau: Project 956 destroyer and Project 1155 large anti-submarine ship. The Udaloy class are generally considered the Soviet equivalent of the American Spruance-class destroyers. There are variations in SAM and air search radar among units of the class. Based on the Krivak class, the emphasis on anti-submarine warfare (ASW) left these ships with limited anti-surface and area anti-air capabilities.

In 2015, the Russian Navy initially announced that five out of the eight Project 1155 ships will be refurbished and upgraded as part of the Navy modernization program by 2022. In 2020 it was suggested that a total of eight Project 1155/1155.1 vessels would be upgraded to the same standard, though work on the remaining three units would extend beyond 2022. In addition to overhauling their radio-electronic warfare and life support systems, they will receive modern missile complexes to fire P-800 Oniks and Kalibr cruise missiles. The ships are to have their service life extended by 30 years until sufficient numbers of Admiral Gorshkov-class frigates are commissioned. Upgrades will include replacing the Rastrub-B missiles with 3S24 angling launchers fitted with four containers using the 3M24 anti-ship missile, and two 3S14-1155 universal VLS with 16 cells for Kalibr land attack, anti-ship, and anti-submarine cruise missiles in place of one of the AK-100 guns.

=== Udaloy II ===
Following the Udaloy's commissioning, designers began developing an upgrade package in 1982 to provide more balanced capabilities with a greater emphasis on anti-ship warfare. The resulting Project 1155.1 Fregat-M Large ASW Ship (NATO reporting name: Udaloy II) is roughly the counterpart of the improved Spruance-class. Due to the collapse of the Soviet Union, the dire economic situation in Russia that followed it and the radical cuts in military spending, only one ship was completed.

Similar to the Udaloy-class externally, it has a new weapon configuration with P-270 Moskit anti-ship missiles replacing the URK-5 Rastrub-B ASW/ASuW missiles; a twin 130 mm AK-130 gun replacing two single 100 mm AK-100 guns; two RBU-12000 ASW rocket launchers replacing both RBU-6000 ASW rocket launchers and two Kortik CIWS replacing all six AK-630 CIWS. A standoff ASW capability is retained by launching RPK-6 Vodopad missiles from the torpedo tubes.

Powered by a modern gas turbine engine, the Udaloy II is equipped with more capable sonars, an integrated air defense fire control system, and a number of digital electronic systems based on state-of-the-art circuitry. The original MGK-355 Polinom integrated sonar system (with NATO reporting names Horse Jaw and Horse Tail for the hull-mounted and towed parts respectively ) on Udaloy-I ships is replaced by its successor, a newly designed Zvezda M-2 sonar system that has a range in excess of 100 kilometres (62 mi) in the 2nd convergence zone. The Zvezda sonar system is considered by its designers to be the equivalent in terms of overall performance of the AN/SQS-53 on US destroyers, though much bulkier and heavier than its American counterpart: the length of the hull-mounted portion is nearly 30 m (98 ft). The torpedo approaching warning function of the Polinom sonar system is retained and further improved by its successor.

== Operational history ==
In 2008, Admiral Chabanenko became the first Russian warship to transit the Panama Canal since World War II.

Vice-Admiral Kulakov deployed to the Mediterranean Sea from its home base in Russia's Northern Fleet in June 2014.

== Ships ==
Name	Namesake	Laid down	Launched	Commissioned	Status
Udaloy I class
Udaloy	"bold"	23 July 1977	5 February 1980	31 December 1980	Decommissioned in 1997. Scrapped at Murmansk in 2002.
Vice-Admiral Kulakov	Nikolai Kulakov	4 November 1977	16 May 1980	29 December 1981	Modernization completed in 2010. In service with the Northern Fleet.
Marshal Vasilyevsky	Aleksandr Vasilevsky	22 April 1979	29 December 1981	8 December 1983	Decommissioned in 2006 and scrapped.
Admiral Zakharov	Mikhail Zakharov	16 October 1981	4 November 1982	30 December 1983	Caught fire in 1991. Decommissioned in 2002 and scrapped.
Admiral Spiridonov	Emil Spiridonov	11 April 1982	28 April 1984	30 December 1984	Decommissioned in 2001 and scrapped.
Admiral Tributs	Vladimir Filippovich Tributs	19 April 1980	26 March 1983	30 December 1985	Caught fire in 1991, but modernized and returned to service. In service with the Pacific Fleet.
Marshal Shaposhnikov	Boris Shaposhnikov	25 May 1983	27 December 1984	30 December 1985	Returned to service on 27 April 2021 after reconfiguration, now referred to as a frigate. In service with the Pacific Fleet.
Severomorsk	Severomorsk	12 June 1984	24 December 1985	30 December 1987	Tasked to the Northern Fleet, though operating regularly in the Baltic as of 2026
Admiral Levchenko	Gordey Levchenko	27 January 1982	21 February 1985	30 September 1988	Active with the Northern Fleet as of 2026
Admiral Vinogradov	Nikolai Vinogradov	5 February 1986	4 June 1987	30 December 1988	Undergoing refit to Marshal Shaposhnikov standard. Set to return to service with the Pacific Fleet.
Admiral Kharlamov	Nikolay Kharlamov	7 August 1986	29 June 1988	1 April 1990	Decommissioned on 1 December 2020.
Admiral Panteleyev	Yuri Aleksandrovich Panteleyev	24 May 1987	1988	1 May 1992	In service with the Pacific Fleet.
Udaloy II class
Admiral Chabanenko	Andrei Chabanenko	28 February 1989	16 June 1994	28 January 1999	In overhaul, planned to return to service with the Northern Fleet by 2025.
Admiral Basisty	Nikolai Basistiy	1991	Scrapped in 1994		
Admiral Kucherov	Stepan Kucherov	1991	Scrapped in 1993		

== Gallery ==
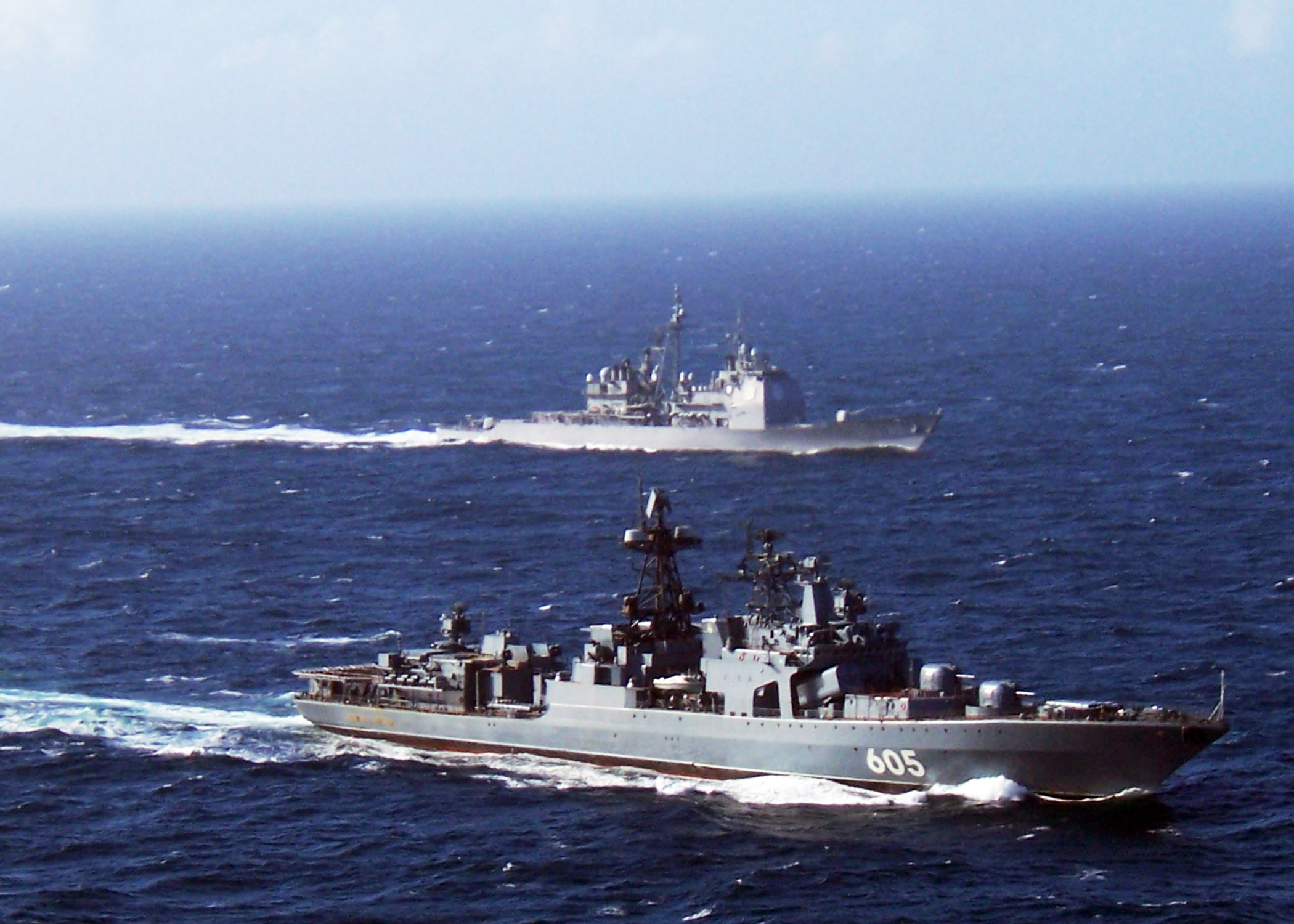
Admiral Levchenko (605) sailing along with USS Hue City in the North Sea, 2004

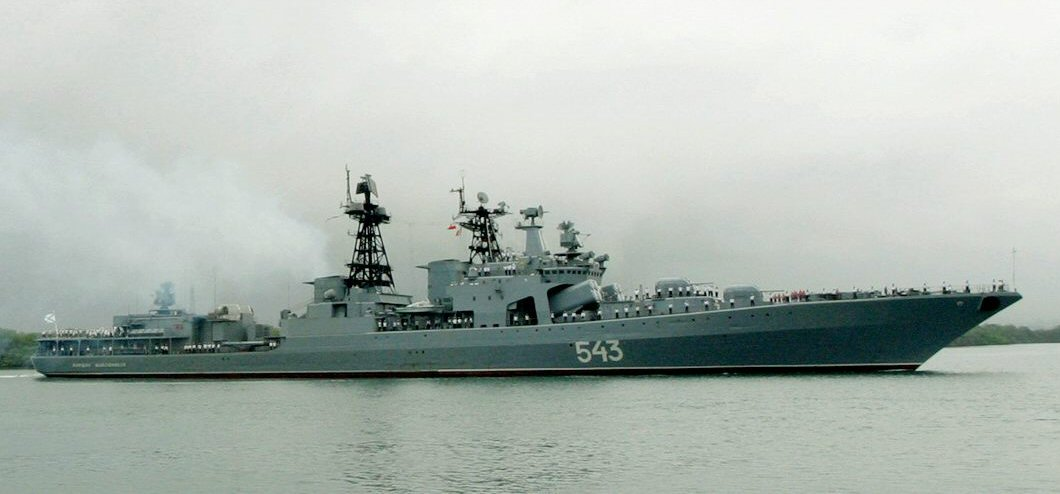
Marshal Shaposhnikov transiting the channel into Pearl Harbor in 2003

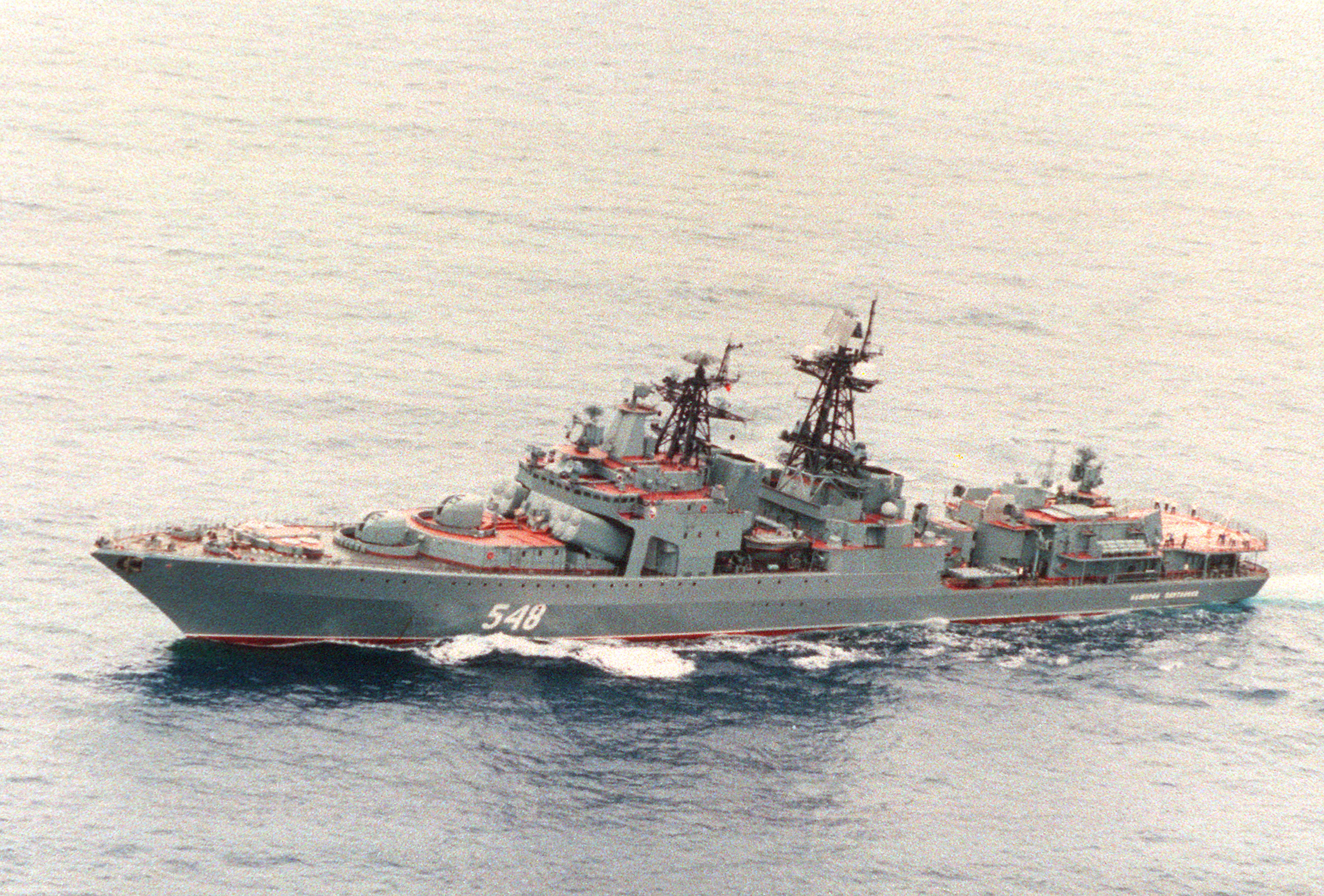
Admiral Panteleyev

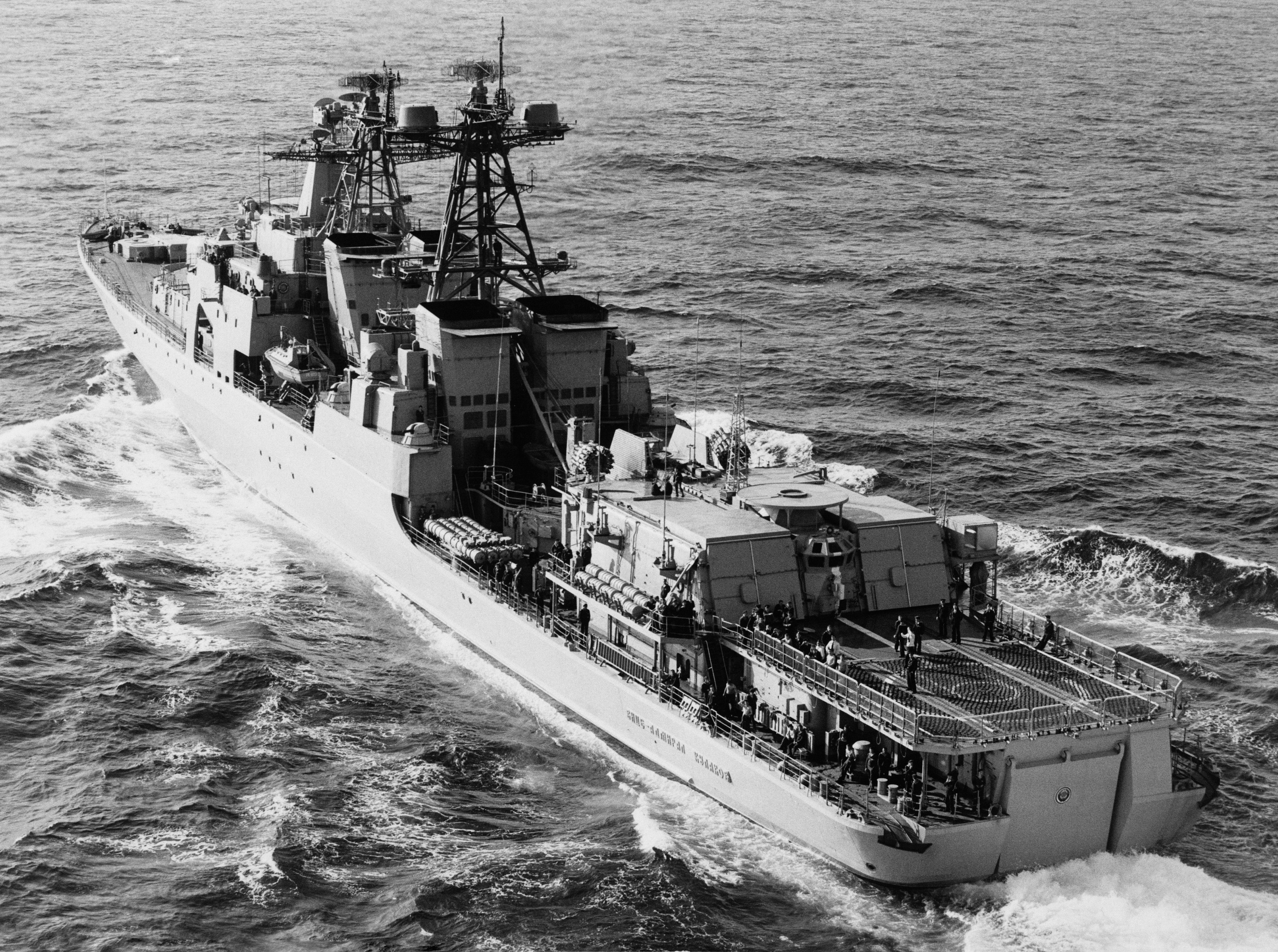
Vice Admiral Kulakov in 1985

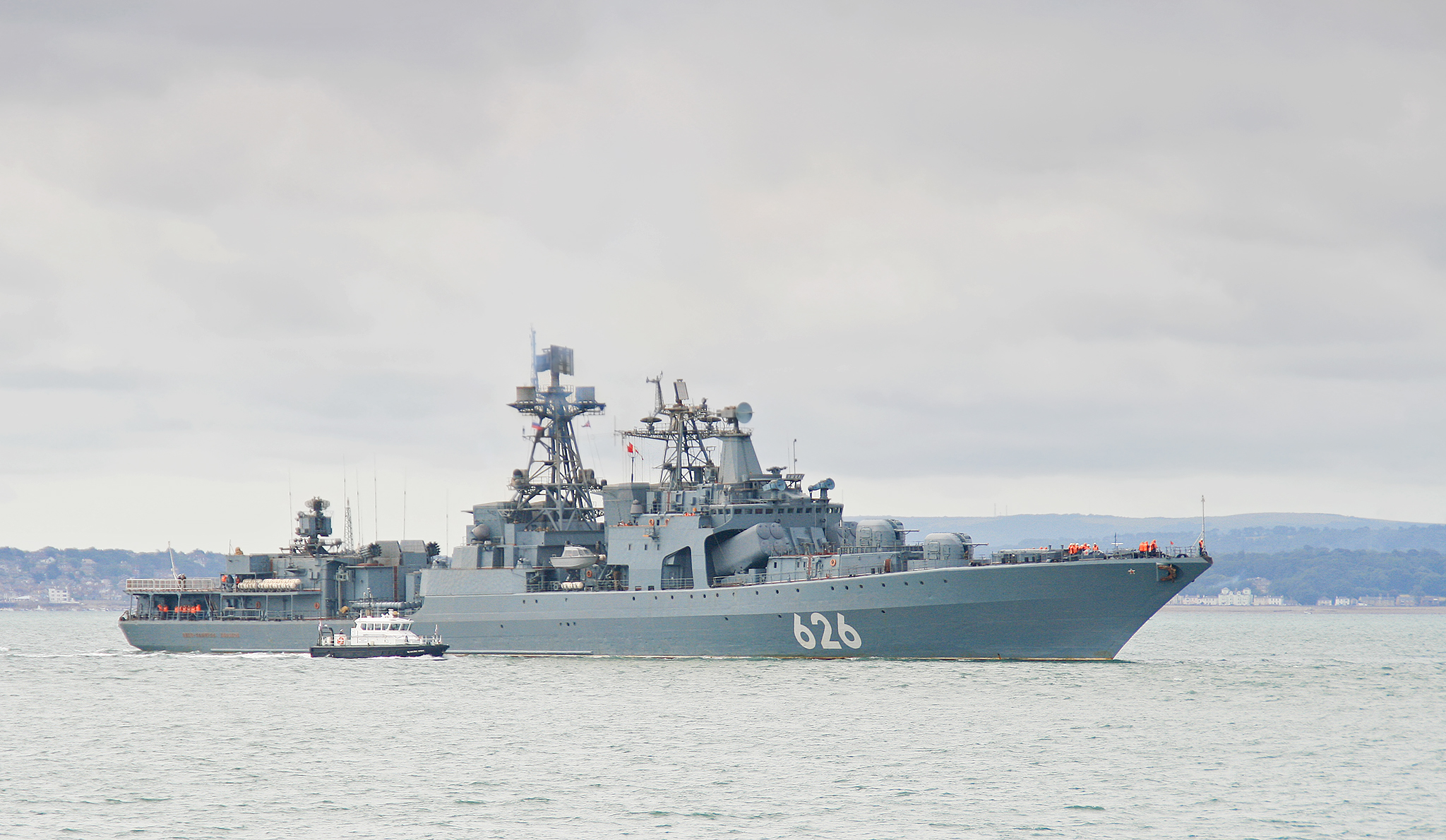
Vice-Admiral Kulakov arriving at Portsmouth, UK in August 2012.

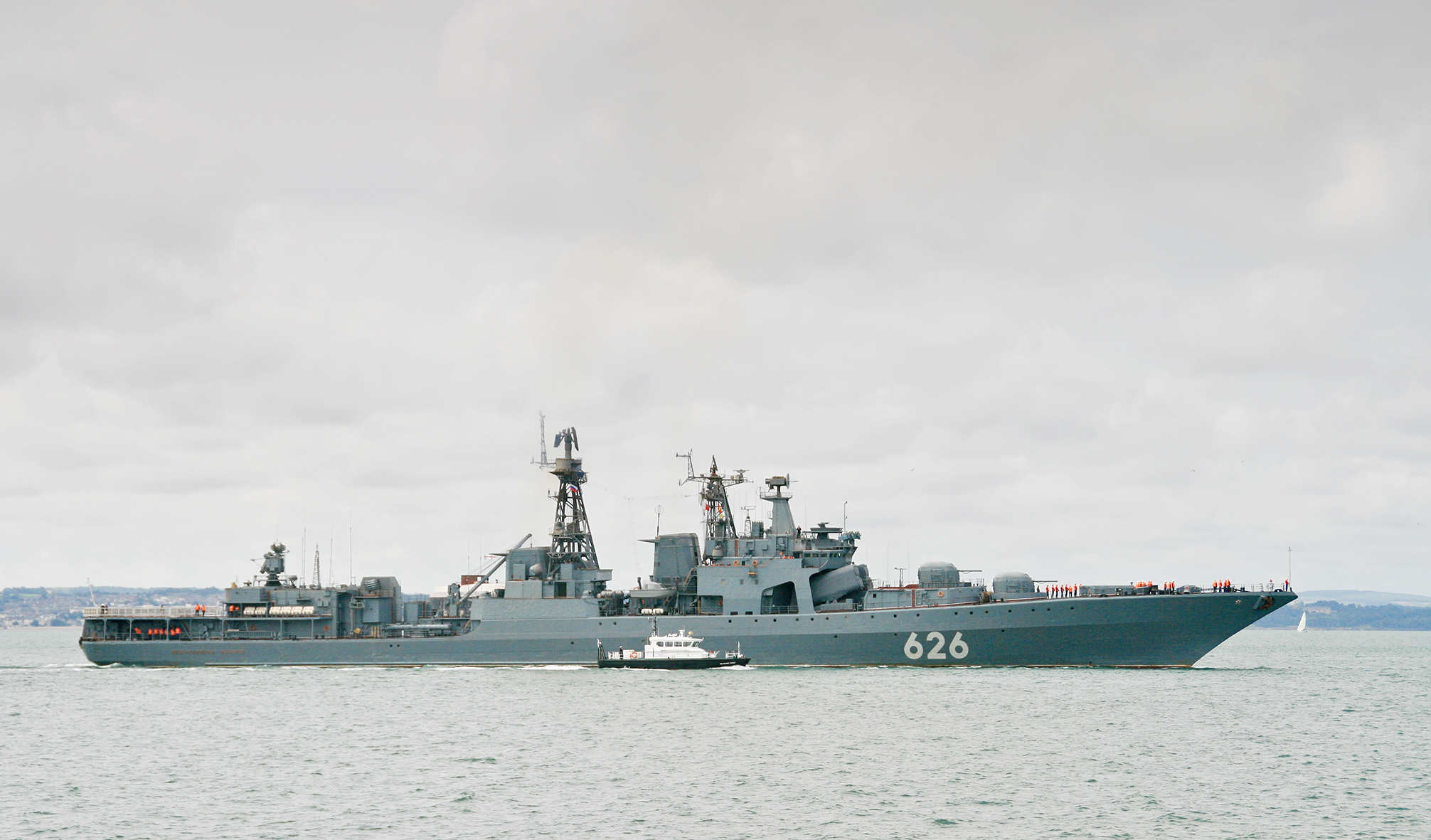
Vice-Admiral Kulakov arriving at Portsmouth, UK in August 2012.

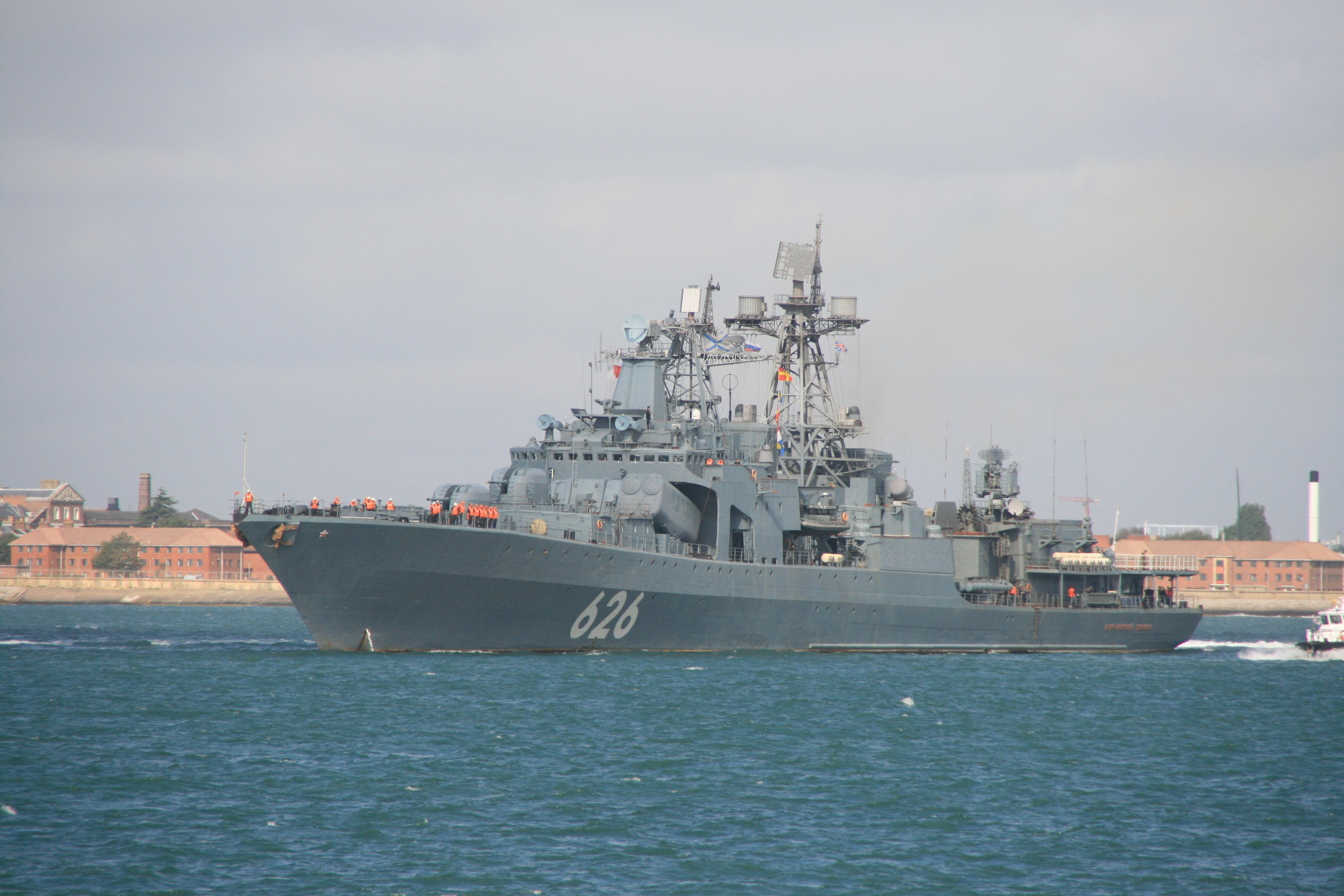
Vice-Admiral Kulakov leaving Portsmouth, UK in August 2012.

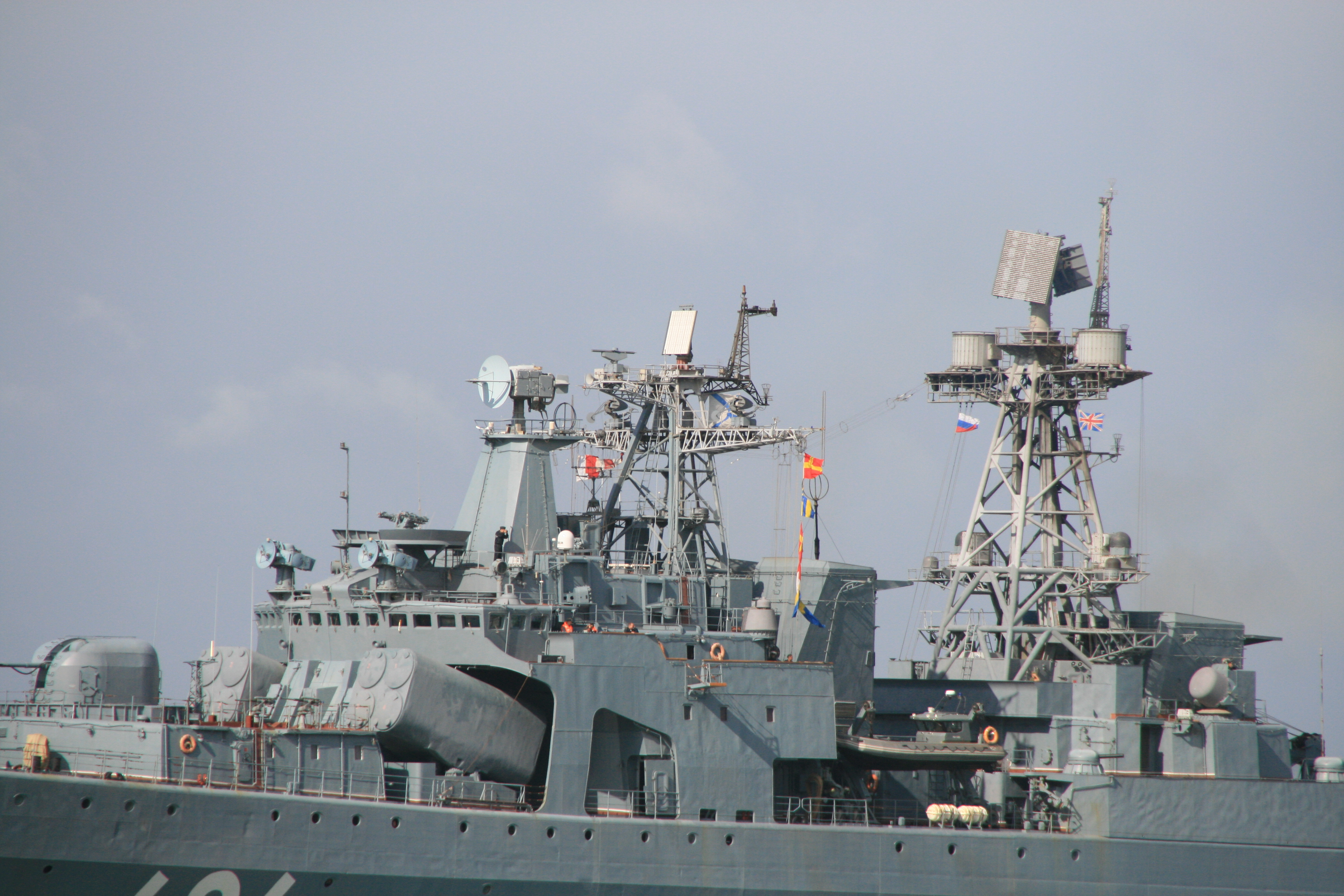
Vice-Admiral Kulakov's upperworks and Top Plate radar.

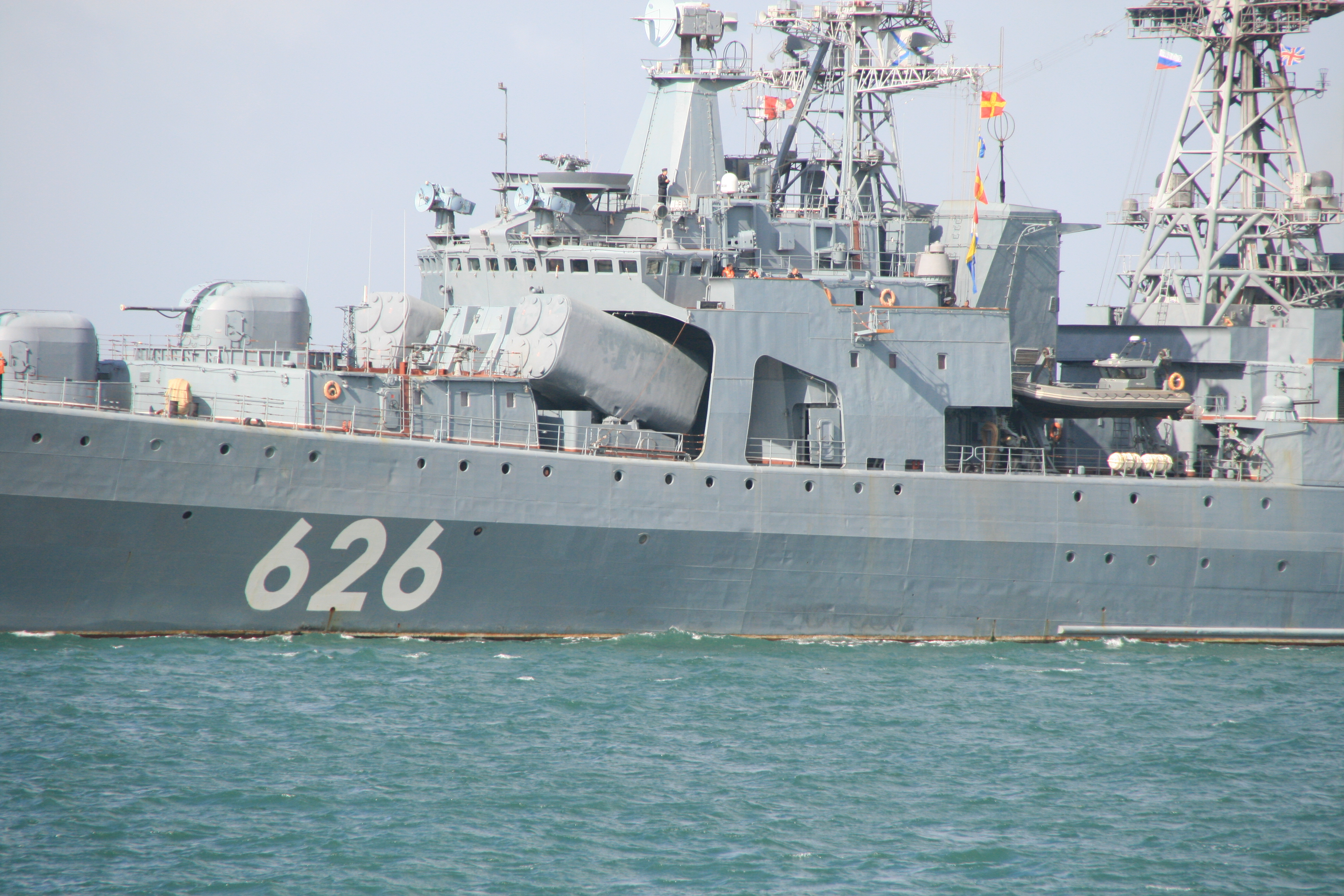
SS-N-14 Silex missiles aboard Vice-Admiral Kulakov.

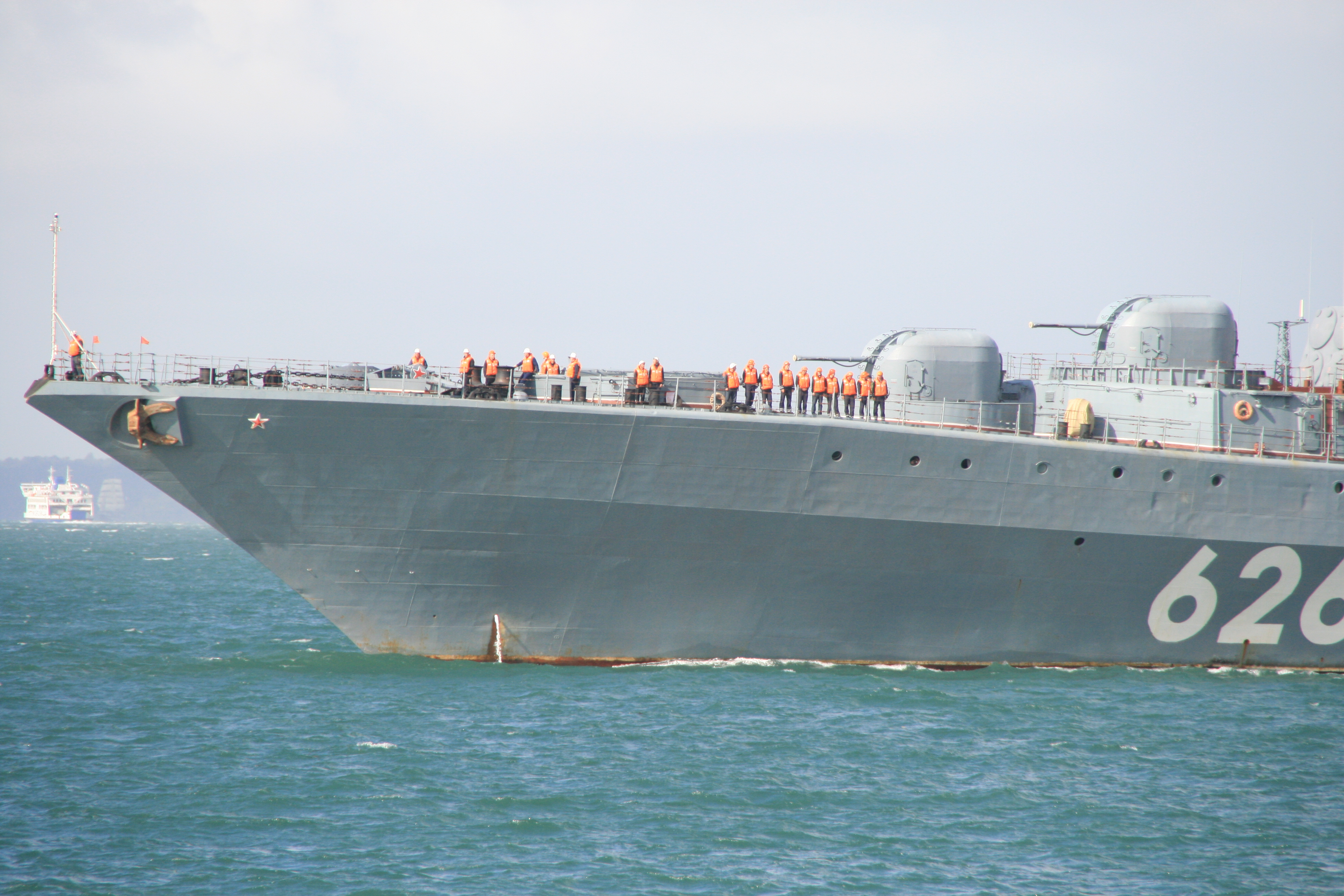
100mm 70cal DP guns of Vice-Admiral Kulakov.

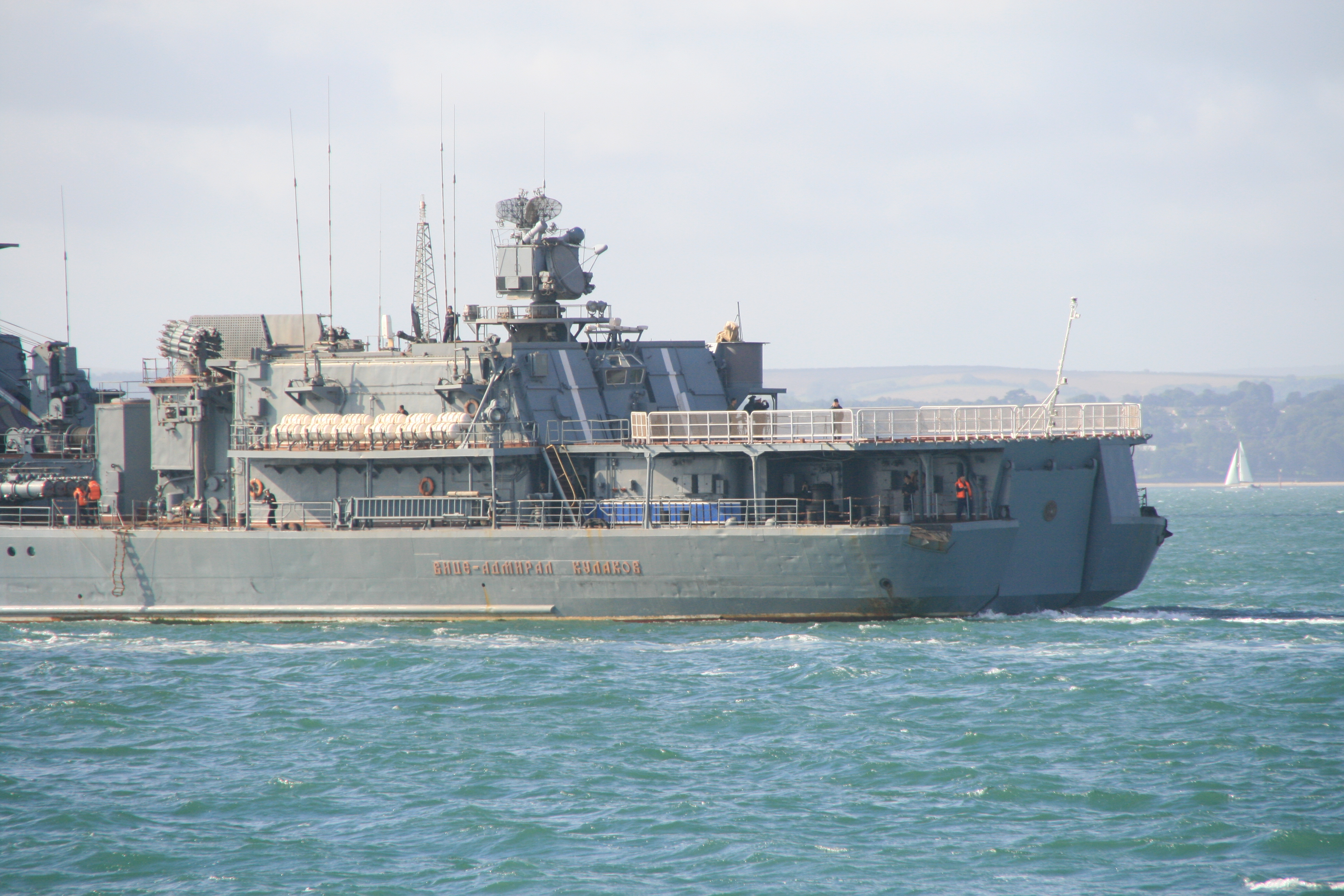
Stern & flight deck of Vice-Admiral Kulakov.

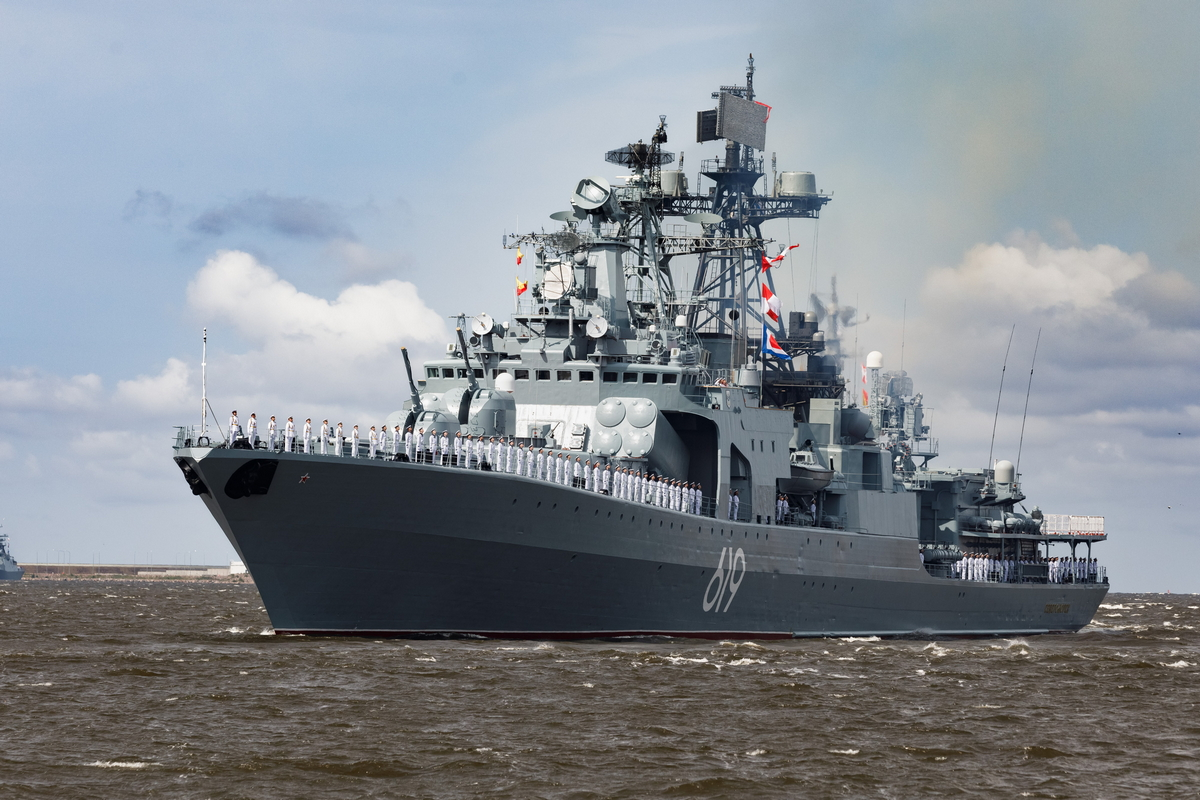
Severomorsk during the Russian Navy Day Parade in 2023.

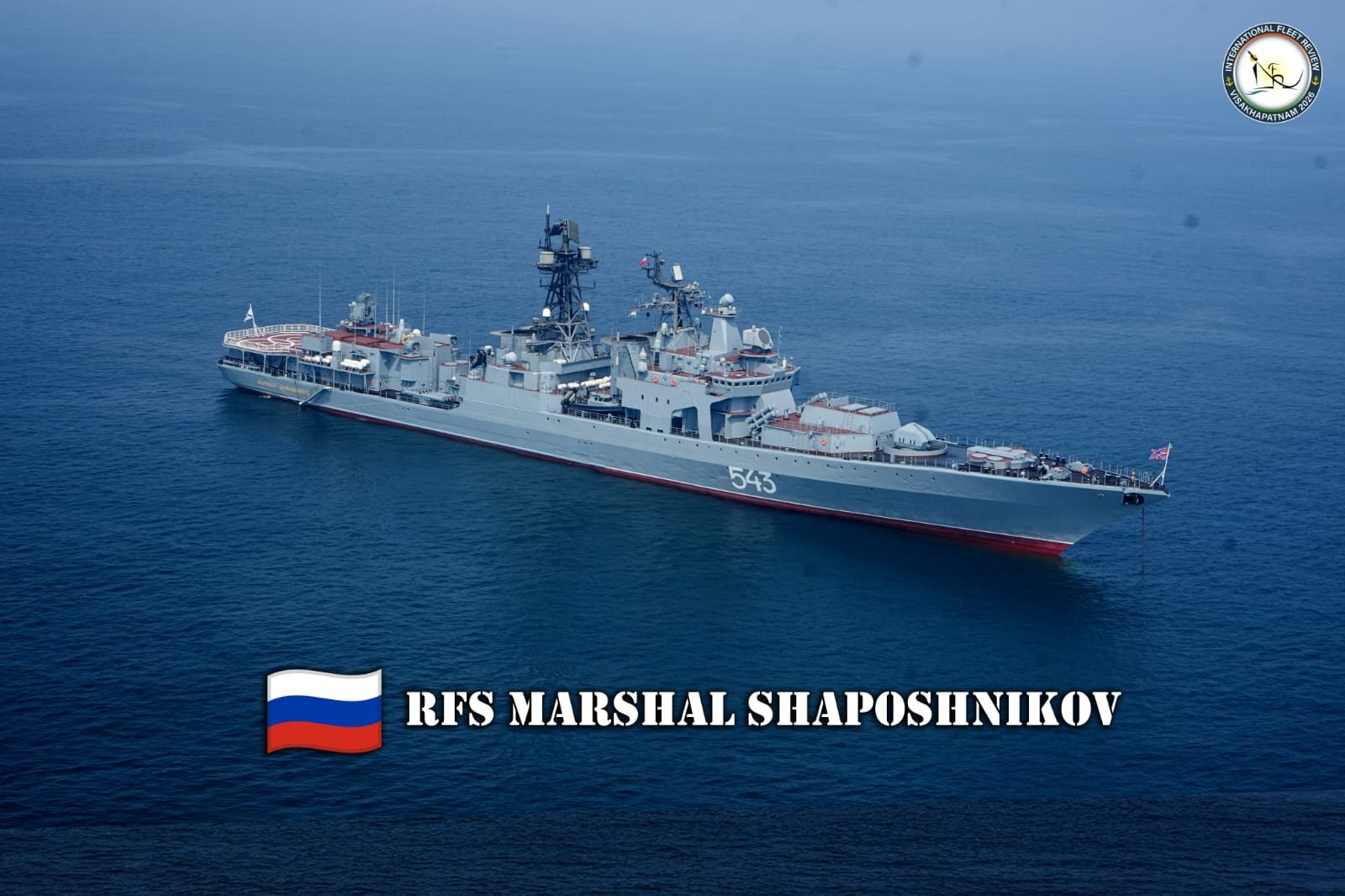
Marshal Shaposhnikov underway after its modernization, showing its new armaments: A-190, Kalibr/Oniks/Zircon VLS, and Kh-35 missile system.

== See also ==
- List of ships of Russia by project number
- List of destroyer classes in service

Equivalent destroyers of the same era

- Kidd class
- Hatakaze class
- Rajput class
- Type 051D
- Almirante Brown class

== Bibliography ==
- Friedman, Norman (1995). "Soviet Union 1947–1991: Russian Federation and Successor States 1991–". In Chumbley, Stephen (ed.). Conway's All the World's Fighting Ships, 1947–1995. Naval Institute Press. pp. 337–426. ISBN 1-55750-132-7.
- Pavlov, A. S. (1997). Warships of the USSR and Russia 1945–1995. Naval Institute Press. ISBN 1-55750-671-X.
- Radziemski, Jan (2026). Soviet Cold War Destroyers. Osprey Publishing. ISBN 978-1-4728-7489-4.
