= Belokamenka =

Belokamenka (Russian: Белокаменка) is the name of several rural localities in Russia:

- Belokamenka, Chelyabinsk Oblast, a settlement in Nizhnesanarsky Selsoviet of Troitsky District of Chelyabinsk Oblast
- Belokamenka, Murmansk Oblast, a selo under the administrative jurisdiction of the closed administrative-territorial formation of Alexandrovsk in Murmansk Oblast
- Belokamenka, Penza Oblast, a selo in Teleginsky Selsoviet of Kolyshleysky District of Penza Oblast
- Belokamenka, Ulyanovsk Oblast, a settlement under the administrative jurisdiction of Nikolayevsky Settlement Okrug in Nikolayevsky District of Ulyanovsk Oblast
- Belokamenka, Volgograd Oblast, a selo in Ilovatsky Selsoviet of Staropoltavsky District of Volgograd Oblast
