= Russian destroyer Udaloy =

Udaloy-class destroyer of the Russian Navy

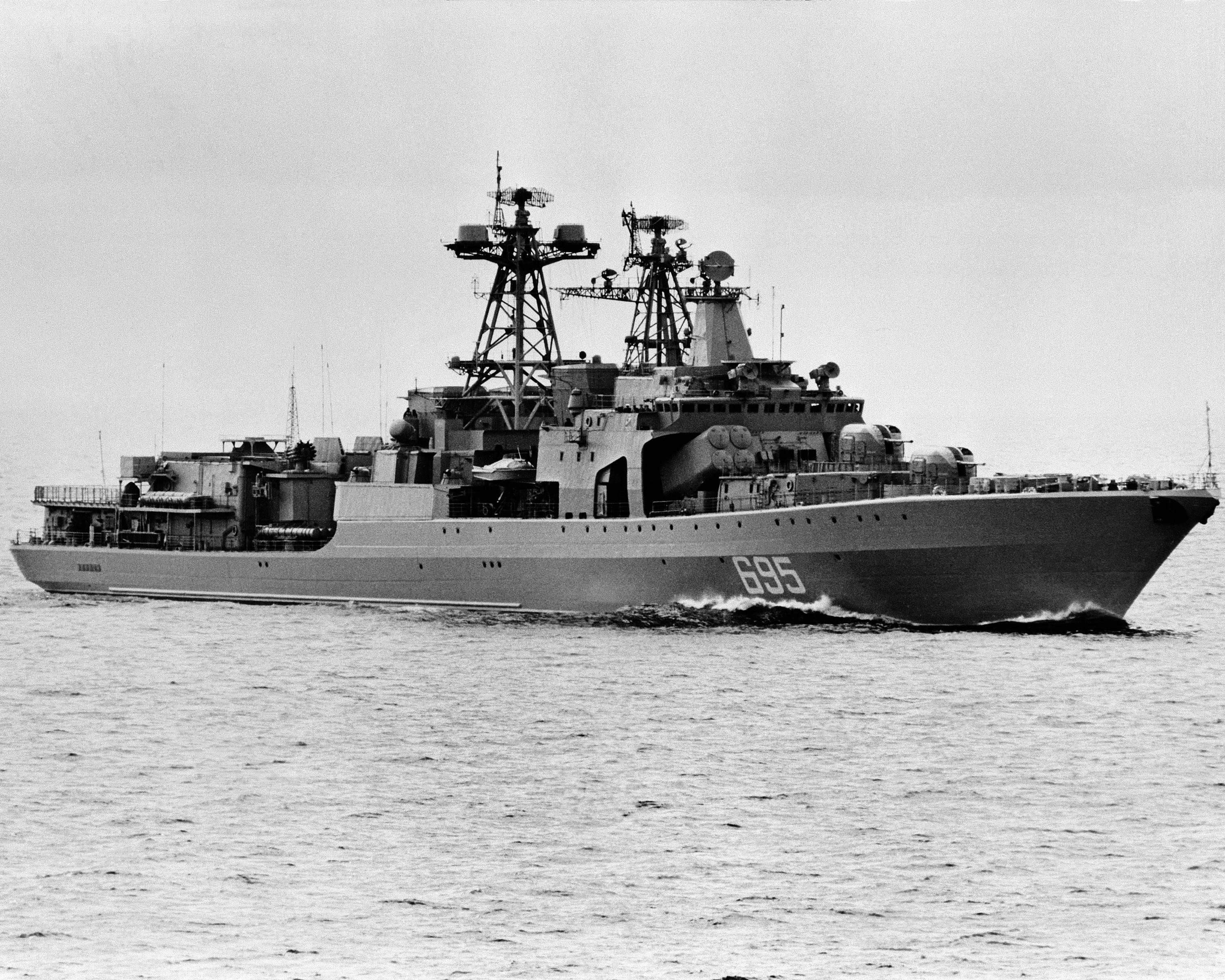
- Udaloy in 1983

History

Russia
- Name: Udaloy; (Удалой)
- Namesake: Udaloy
- Builder: Yantar Shipyard, Kaliningrad
- Laid down: 23 July 1977
- Launched: 5 February 1980
- Commissioned: 31 December 1980
- Decommissioned: 1996
- Home port: Severomorsk
- Identification: Pennant number: 444, 480, 612, 637, 658, 695
- Fate: Scrapped 2006

General characteristics
- Class & type: Udaloy-class destroyer 7,570 tons full load
- Length: 163 m (535 ft)
- Beam: 19.3 m (63 ft)
- Draught: 6.2 m (20 ft)
- Propulsion: 2 shaft COGAG, 2× D090 6.7 MW and 2× DT59 16.7 gas turbines, 120,000 hp 89.456 MW
- Speed: 35 kn (65 km/h; 40 mph)
- Range: 10,500 nmi (19,400 km; 12,100 mi) at 14 kn (26 km/h; 16 mph)
- Complement: 300
- Sensors & processing systems: Radar: MR-760MA Fregat-MA/Top Plate 3-D air search radar and MR-320M Topaz-V/Strut Pair air/surface search radar; Sonar: Horse Tail LF VDS sonar and Horse Jaw bow mounted LF sonar; Fire Control: 2 MR-360 Podkat/Cross Sword SA-N-9 SAM control, 2 3P37/Hot Flash SA-N-11 SAM control, Garpun-BAL SSM targeting
- Electronic warfare & decoys: Bell Squat jammer; Bell Shroud intercept; Bell Crown intercept; 2 × PK-2 decoy RL; 10 × PK-10 decoy RL in later ships
- Armament: 2 × 1 AK-100 100 mm naval guns; 8 (2 × 4) SS-N-14 'Silex' anti-submarine/anti-ship missiles; 64 (8 × 8) VLS cells for SA-N-9 'Gauntlet' surface-to-air missiles; 4 × 6 30 mm AK-630 CIWS; 2 × 1 21KM AA guns; 2 × 4 533 mm torpedo tubes for Type 53 or Type 65 torpedoes; 2 × 12 RBU-6000 anti-submarine rocket launchers
- Aircraft carried: 2 × Ka-27 series helicopters
- Aviation facilities: Helipad and hangar

Udaloy was a Udaloy-class destroyer of the Russian Navy.

== Development and design ==
Project 1155 dates to the 1970s when it was concluded that it was too costly to build large-displacement, multi-role combatants. The concept of a specialized surface ship was developed by Soviet designers.

They are 156m in length, 17.3m in beam and 6.5m in draught.

== Construction and career ==
Udaloy was laid down on 23 July 1977, and launched on 5 February 1980 by Yantar Shipyard in Kaliningrad. She was commissioned on 31 December 1980.

She joined the Northern Fleet on January 24, 1981. Enlisted in the 10th brigade of anti-submarine ships of the 7th operational squadron based at Severomorsk.

Since October 26, 1983, he has been in the Atlantic Ocean. Together with Admiral Isakov, Otchayannyy and Genrikh Hasanov escorted the Novorossiysk to the latitude of Gibraltar.

March 26–30, 1984, an official visit to the island of Cuba in Havana, Cienfuegos, then completed the tasks of combat service in the Mediterranean Sea.

In the period from October 24, 1988, to January 19, 1990, it underwent a major overhaul in Kronstadt.

In December 1991, together with the Vigilant in the Strait of Gibraltar, he met and began to escort the Admiral Kuznetsov to Severomorsk. During the voyage, he established and maintained contact with 4 foreign submarines.

Due to a shortage of conscripts at the beginning of 1993, he was transferred to the 2nd category reserve.

On August 16, 1997, he was removed from the Navy.

In 2002, after partial dismantling, he sank in the Kola Bay near the village of Belokamenka. In March 2006, it was raised from the bottom by LLC Gidrotekhservice and disposed of.
