= Russian destroyer Admiral Chabanenko =

Russian anti-submarine destroyer

- Admiral Chabanenko in 2011

History

Russia
- Name: Admiral Chabanenko
- Namesake: Andrei Chabanenko
- Builder: Yantar Shipyard, Kaliningrad
- Laid down: 28 February 1989
- Launched: 16 June 1994
- Commissioned: 28 January 1999
- Status: In overhaul

General characteristics
- Class & type: Udaloy-class destroyer
- Displacement: 6,200 t (6,102 long tons) standard; 7,900 t (7,775 long tons) full load
- Length: 163 m (535 ft)
- Beam: 19 m (62 ft)
- Draught: 7.8 m (26 ft)
- Propulsion: 2 shaft COGAG, 4 gas turbines, 89,000 kW (120,000 hp)
- Speed: 35 knots (65 km/h; 40 mph)
- Range: 10,500 nautical miles (19,400 km) at 14 knots (26 km/h; 16 mph)
- Complement: 300
- Armament: 2 × 4 SS-N-22 anti-ship missiles; 4 × 8 vertical launchers for 32 SA-N-9 surface-to-air missiles; 1 twin-gunned AK-130 130 mm (5.1 in) guns; 4 × AK-630; 2 × 4 553 mm (21.8 in) torpedo tubes, Type 53 ASW/ASuW torpedo; 2 × RBU-6000 anti submarine rocket launchers
- Aircraft carried: 2 x Ka-27 'Helix' series helicopters
- Aviation facilities: Helicopter deck and hangar

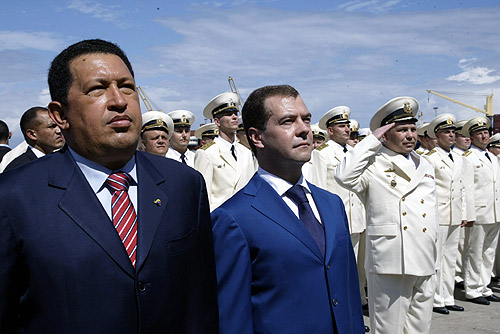
Venezuelan President Hugo Chavez and Russian President Dmitry Medvedev on board Admiral Chabanenko in 2008.

Admiral Chabanenko is an Udaloy II-class anti-submarine destroyer of the Russian Navy. The destroyer was laid down in 1989, during the Soviet period, and was finished by Russia 10 years later, after the dissolution of the Soviet Union. She is the last destroyer commissioned in the Russian Navy. In 1999 she deployed with the Northern Fleet. The Admiral Chabanenko is the sole vessel of the Project 1155.1 design, a modified version of the Project 1155 design, also called Udaloy class. The design is also known as the Udaloy II class. The ship includes updated weapon systems like the SS-N-22 anti-ship missile and the "Zvezda" M-2 series sonar system. She is named after Admiral Andrei Chabanenko, commander of the Northern Fleet between 1952 and 1962.

In 2008 the Admiral Chabanenko became the first Russian warship to sail through the Panama Canal since World War II, while participating in joint exercises with the Venezuelan Navy. In late 2009 she and the Black Sea Fleet's rescue tug Shakhter deployed off the Horn of Africa, as part of the anti-piracy measures off the Somali coast. Both vessels then sailed to Norfolk Naval Base to participate in FRUKUS 2011, a series of joint exercises between the Russian, French, British and US navies, held between 23 and 30 June 2011.

In December 2013 Admiral Chabanenko docked at the 35th ship repair plant in Murmansk to undergo the overhaul of her engines. The repairs were expanded in August 2017 into a more thorough overhaul and refit of the ship, expected to be completed in December 2019. However, it was later confirmed that the ship still remained in refit as of 2020. In September 2023, it was reported that Admiral Chabanenko would return to service in 2025 at the earliest. According to Ukrainian sources as of 2025, it appears the ship was in disrepair, and most if not all of its weapons systems had been removed.
