= Mikhail Zakharov =

Soviet naval officer

Mikhail Nikolayevich Zakharov
- Born: 5 November 1912; Saint Petersburg, Russian Empire
- Died: 19 February 1978 (aged 65); Leningrad, Soviet Union
- Burial place: Serafimovskoe Cemetery
- Military career
- Allegiance: Soviet Union
- Branch: Soviet Navy
- Service years: 1930–1977
- Rank: Admiral
- Conflicts: Second World War
- Awards: Order of Lenin; Order of the Patriotic War First and Second Class; Order of the Red Banner – twice Order of the Red Star – three times Order "For Service to the Homeland in the Armed Forces of the USSR" Third Class

Mikhail Nikolayevich Zakharov (Russian: Михаил Николаевич Захаров) (5 November 1912 – 19 February 1978) was an officer of the Soviet Navy. He saw action in the Second World War and rose to the rank of admiral.

Born in Saint Petersburg, in the Russian Empire in 1912, Zakharov began his naval career in 1930 with service with Coastal Defence Artillery Brigades, before moving into the political branch. He was military commissar at the Pacific Fleet's base at Nikolayevsk-on-Amur during the German invasion of the Soviet Union, and during the war served on the military councils of the Pacific Fleet, the Volga Military District and the Northern Fleet. He followed this with work as a propagandist and as a senior instructor, and later as inspector of the fleet's political administration.

Zakharov served in the political department of the Black Sea Fleet after the war, and in 1956 joined the Pacific Fleet's military council, which he served on for the next 15 years, rising through the ranks to admiral. His last posting was head of the political department of the Naval Academy, which he held until shortly before his retirement in 1977. He had served as deputy to both the Supreme Soviet of the Soviet Union and the Supreme Soviet of the RSFSR during this time. He received a number of awards and honours over his career, and after his death in 1978 a street in Vladivostok and an Udaloy-class destroyer, Admiral Zakharov, were named in his honour.

== Early life ==
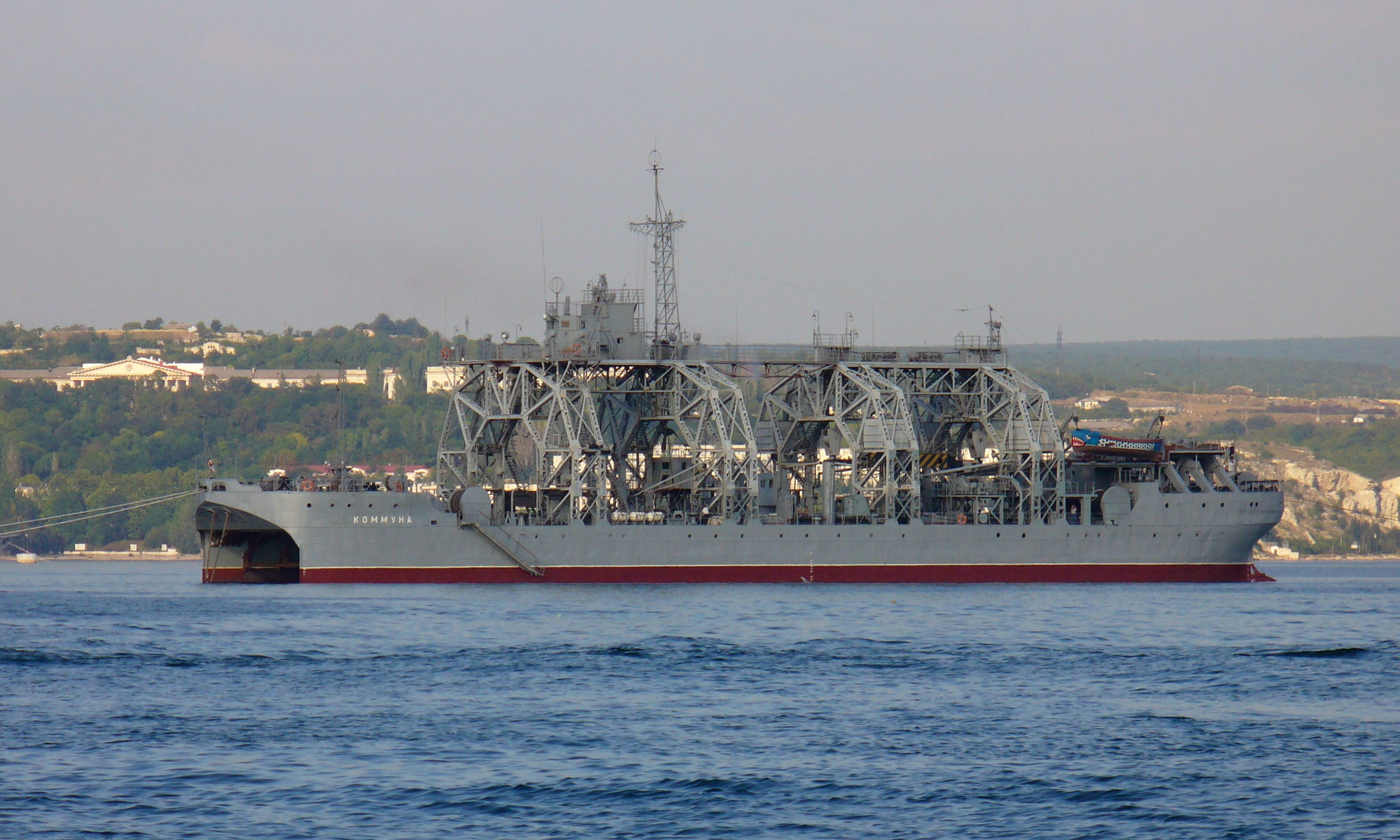
The submarine support ship Kommuna. Zakharov spent several months aboard her during his studies.

Born in Saint Petersburg, in the Russian Empire on 5 November 1912, Zakharov entered the navy in 1930 and from October to December 1930 served as the commander of a company of the Red Navy's 1st Coastal Defence Artillery Brigade. In December 1930 he entered the Baltic Fleet's Machine School, graduating in November 1931 after time spent between May and August 1931 aboard the submarine support ship Kommuna. In November 1931 he became commander of the Baltic Fleet's 1st Division of Coastal Defence Artillery Brigade, and joined the Communist Party in 1932. From January until November 1932 Zakharov was commander of the 3rd Independent Artillery Division, followed by service as political commissar of a company of the Red Navy's 1st Training Battalion of the Far East Naval Forces from November 1932 to August 1933.

== Political commissar and the Great Patriotic War ==
In August 1933 Zakharov became political commissar of the 5th Separate Railway Artillery Division's battery, holding the post until September 1937. In that month he became commander of the guard ship Vyuga, having completed the six-month course for political officers. In June 1938 he became military commissar of the destroyer Voikov, and in June 1939 took up the post of head of the political department of the Sovgavan fortified area. Zakharov became military commissar of the Pacific Fleet's base at Nikolayevsk-on-Amur in April 1940, holding the position until October 1942. In January 1943 he was on the military council of the Pacific Fleet, followed by the Volga Military District's military council. In March 1943 he went to the Far North to serve on the Northern Fleet's military council, and then from April to June served as a propagandist for the submarine squadron's political department. Zakharov followed this with a post as senior instructor in the organizational and training department.

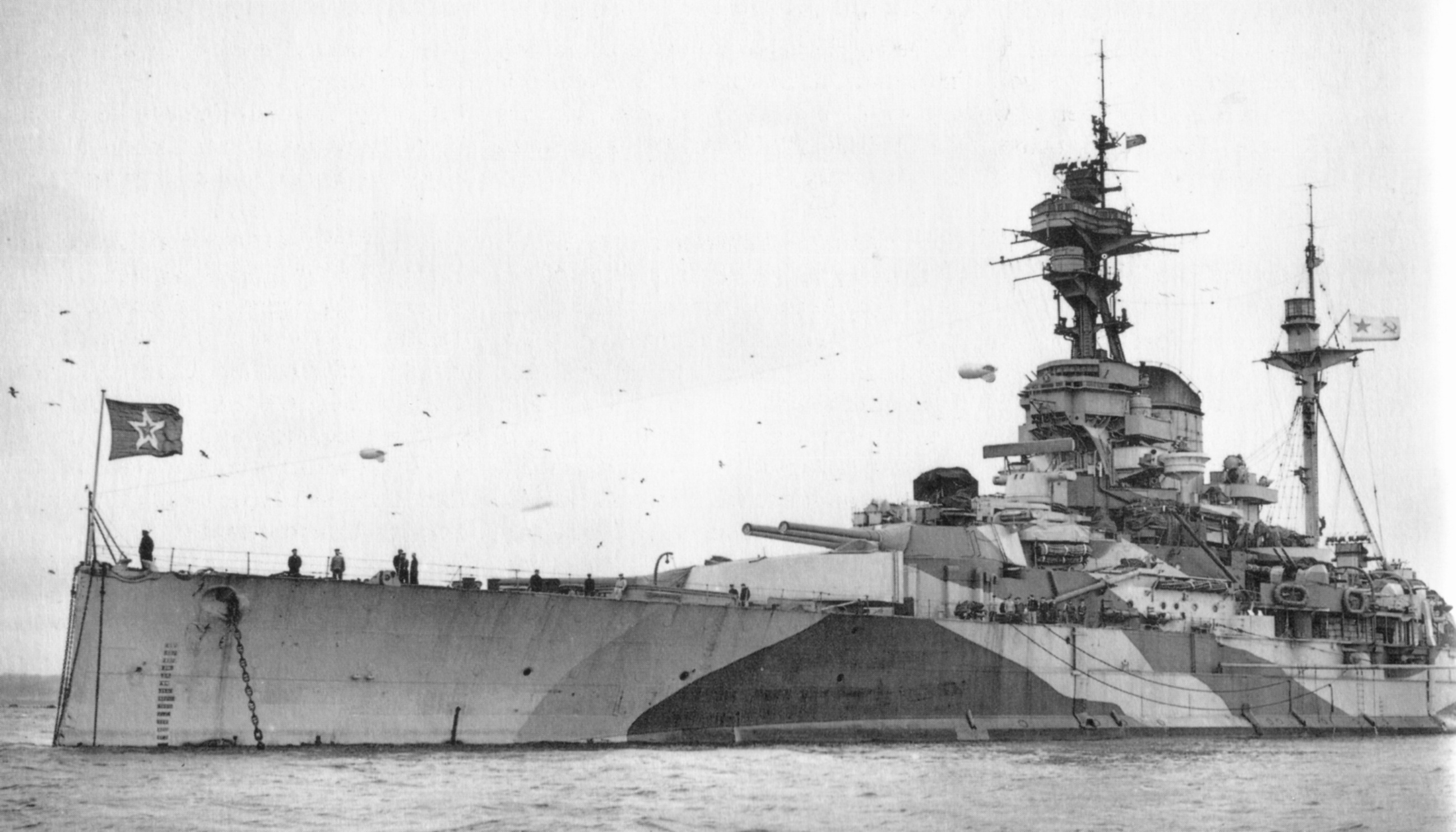
The battleship Arkhangelsk, Zakharov's ship from September 1944 to May 1947

Between October 1943 to September 1944 Zakharov was inspector of the fleet's political administration, and from September 1944 to May 1947 deputy commander for political affairs of the battleship Arkhangelsk. He took the Navy's higher military-political courses in 1947–1948 and then became head of the personnel department of the political department of the Black Sea Fleet. From May 1950 to May 1953 he was head of the Black Sea Fleet's political department concurrently with his post as deputy for the squadron commander's political affairs. During this period he was promoted to rear admiral, on 3 November 1951. He studied at the K.E. Voroshilov Higher Military Academy between May 1953 and November 1955. In January 1956 he was on the military council of the East Baltic Fleet, followed by the Pacific Fleet's military council from October 1956 to September 1971. He received a promotion to vice admiral on 7 May 1960, and then to admiral on 25 October 1967.

== Later life and legacy ==
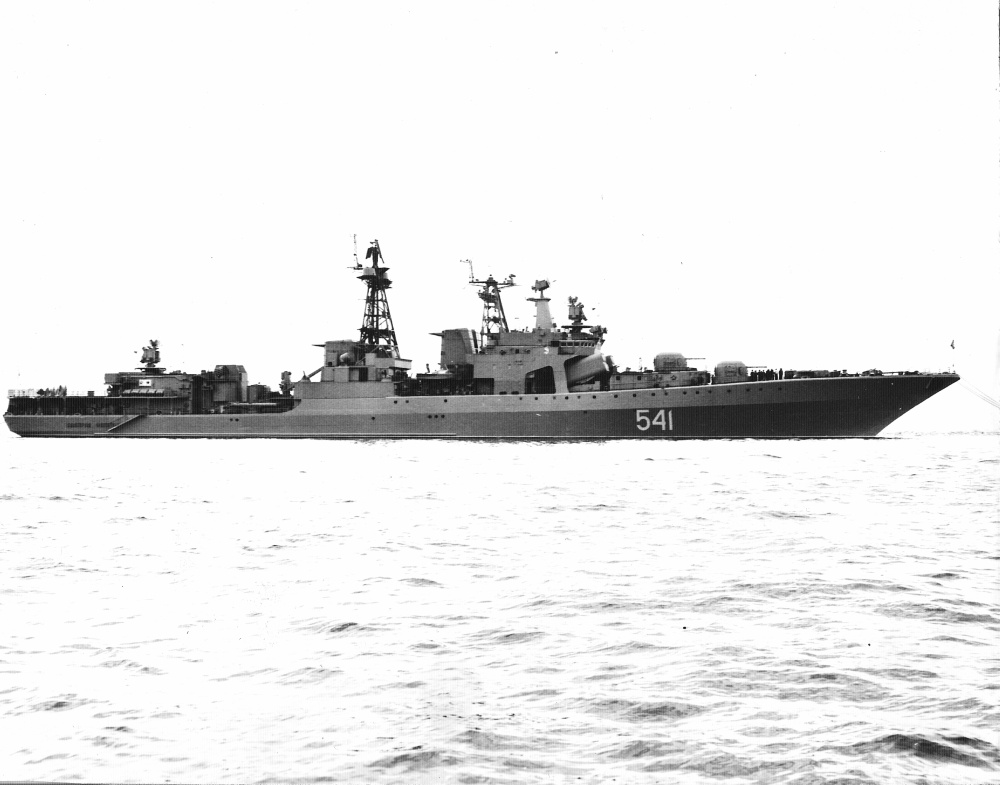
Zakharov's namesake, the Udaloy-class destroyer Admiral Zakharov, in 1990

Between January and March 1969 Zakharov took a two-month course at the V. I. Lenin Military-Political Academy, and after stepping down from the Pacific Fleet's military council in September 1971 he became head of the political department of the Naval Academy. Zakharov was a deputy to the Supreme Soviet of the Soviet Union's sixth and seventh convocations, from 1962 to 1966, and 1966 to 1970 respectively; and deputy to the Supreme Soviet of the RSFSR's 8th convocation. He stepped down from his naval duties in August 1976 and in February 1977 retired due to ill health. He died in Leningrad on 19 February 1978, and was buried at the Serafimovskoe Cemetery. Obituaries appeared in Leningradskaya Pravda on 21 February; Krasnaya Zvezda on 22 February; and Sovetskii Moryak on 24 February 1978.

Zakharov received a number of awards and honours during his career. He was awarded the Order of Lenin in 1955; was twice awarded the Order of the Red Banner; held both the first and second classes of the Order of the Patriotic War; the Order "For Service to the Homeland in the Armed Forces of the USSR" Third Class; and was awarded the Order of the Red Star three times, including in 1947 and 1963. He was also awarded an honorary weapon in 1972. A street was named after him in Vladivostok, with a commemorative plaque installed in 1979. The Udaloy-class destroyer Admiral Zakharov, launched in 1982, was named in his honour.
