= Nikolai Basistiy =

Soviet naval officer (1898-1971)

Nikolai Efremovich Basistiy
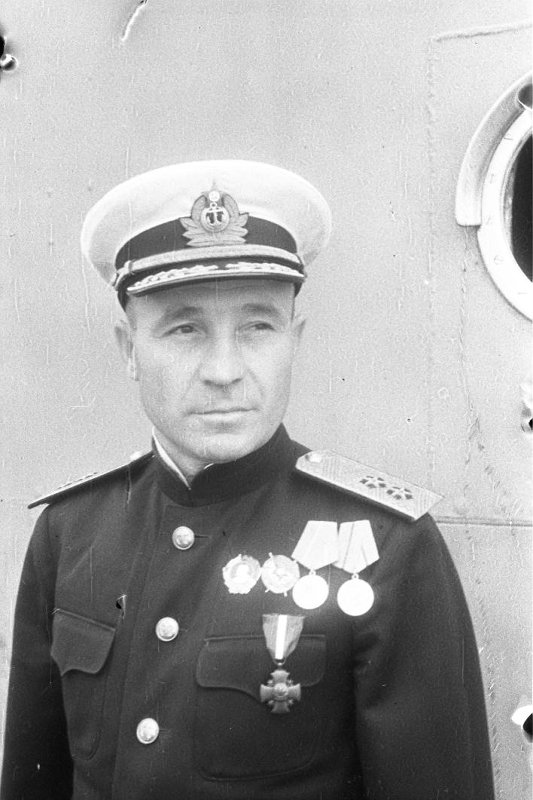
- Basistiy, 1943
- Born: 22 May [O.S. 10 May] 1898; Yurevka, Yelisavetgradsky Uyezd, Kherson Governorate, Russian Empire
- Died: 20 October 1971 (aged 73); Moscow, Soviet Union
- Burial place: Novodevichy Cemetery
- Military career
- Allegiance: Russian Empire; Soviet Union
- Branch: Imperial Russian Navy; Soviet Navy
- Service years: 1914–1960
- Rank: Admiral
- Commands: Black Sea Fleet
- Awards: Imperial Russia: George Medal; Soviet Union: Order of Lenin (twice); Order of the Red Banner (four times); Order of Ushakov Second Class; Order of Kutuzov Second Class; Foreign Awards: Navy Cross (USA)

Nikolai Efremovich Basistiy (Russian: Николай Ефремович Басистый) (22 May [O.S. 10 May] 1898 – 20 October 1971) was an officer of the Soviet Navy. He rose to the rank of admiral and was commander of the Black Sea Fleet, in a career that spanned the First and Second World Wars, and the Russian Civil War.

Born into a peasant family, Basistiy served as a mine specialist during the First World War, being decorated for his service in the Black Sea Fleet. Continuing his naval career after the Russian Revolution, Basistiy became a supporter of the Bolsheviks, and served in the Workers' and Peasants' Red Fleet during the Russian Civil War. He saw action against the White movement and other anti-Bolshevik risings in Odessa and Astrakhan, and as part of the Volga and Caspian Flotillas. With the Bolshevik victory in the civil war, Basistiy undertook various studies and specialised in mine warfare. He was sent to serve as an advisor to the Spanish Republican Navy during the Spanish Civil War, and was decorated for his service.

He served with distinction in the Black Sea during the Second World War, at first as commander of a cruiser, and then rising to the post of chief of staff, and for a time acting fleet commander. He saw action at many of the defensive operations during the sieges of Soviet Black Sea ports, and at the landing operations to force enemy invaders back. Shortly after the war he became commander in chief of the Black Sea Fleet. Towards the end of his career he was a deputy to Supreme Soviet of the Soviet Union, and an advisor to the Group of Inspectors General of the Ministry of Defence, before his retirement in 1960. He wrote his memoirs, which were published shortly before his death in 1971.

== Early career ==
Basistiy was born to a peasant family on 22 May [O.S. 10 May] 1898 in the village of Yurevka, Yelisavetgradsky Uyezd, in the Kherson Governorate, which was at that time part of the Russian Empire. He entered the military with the outbreak of the First World War, graduating from the junker school in Sevastopol in 1915, and in 1916 entered the Black Sea Fleet's mine school. After time aboard the training ship Rion, he served in the fleet as a non-commissioned mine officer second class aboard the destroyers Zharky and Sulin. He was awarded the George Medal and promoted to mine officer first class in autumn 1916.

Basistiy continued in naval service during the Russian Revolution, being elected to the Zharky's ship committee in February 1917 and serving in the Workers' and Peasants' Red Fleet from 1918 onwards. He took part in the Russian Civil War, at first aboard the Zharky where he participated in the suppression of the Haidamaka rising in Odessa, and then as a signalman aboard the artillery barge Serezha, aroundNizhny Novgorod. He then served aboard the gun boat Krasnoye Znamya with the Volga military flotilla in the Tsaritsyn area. Here he fought against the troops of the White movement, led by Generals Anton Denikin and Pyotr Krasnov. Basistiy then served in the Caspian Flotilla, helping to suppress the anti-Bolshevik uprising in Astrakhan.

== Soviet Navy service ==
After the Bolshevik victory in the Civil War, Basistiy attended the Sverdlov Communist University in Moscow from October 1921 to August 1922, and served from August 1922 to October 1926 in various administrative posts in different parts of the Navy. He attended the Naval Academy, graduating in 1931 and from March 1931 to April 1932 worked as an adjunct in the Naval Academy. From April 1932 to March 1934 Basistiy was chief of staff of the minesweeping forces, and from March 1934 to October 1936 was chief of the combat training department at the Pacific Fleet headquarters. Basistiy then went to Spain from April 1937 to July 1938, during the Spanish Civil War, where he served as an adviser to the commander of the Spanish Republican Navy. The Soviets awarded him the Order of the Red Banner for his service in Spain. He completed a course of studies at the Military Academy of the General Staff and from July 1938 to October 1939 was the Black Sea Fleet's chief of operations.

== The Second World War ==
The cruiser Chervona Ukraina, Basistiy's ship from 1939 until 1941

October 1939 Basistiy took command of the cruiser Chervona Ukraina, and was her captain at the German invasion of the Soviet Union in 1941. Basistiy was transferred to command the Black Sea Fleet's Light Squadron in November 1941, holding the post until July 1942. During this time he assisted in the Kerch-Feodosiya landing operation in December 1941-January 1942. From July 1942 to March 1943 he was commander of the Black Sea Fleet's cruiser squadron, taking part in the defence of Novorossiysk. He was temporarily the fleet's chief of staff from April to May 1943, after which he once more commanded a squadron of the fleet. He was once more chief of staff of the fleet from November 1944 to November 1948, with a brief period from January to April 1945 when he was acting commander of the Black Sea Fleet.

== Postwar ==
Basistiy was commander of the Black Sea Fleet from November 1948 to August 1951, after which he became First Deputy Naval Minister of the USSR, until April 1953. From April 1953 to November 1956 he served as First Deputy Commander-in-Chief of the Navy, and from November 1956 to June 1958 was Deputy Commander-in-Chief of the Navy for military research. From 1952 to 1956 he was a candidate member of the Central Committee of the Communist Party of the Soviet Union, and was a Deputy of the Supreme Soviet of the Soviet Union at its 3rd and 4th convocation sessions, from 1950 to 1954 and 1954 to 1958 respectively. Basistiy's last posting was as Advisor to the Group of Inspectors General of the Ministry of Defence, from June 1958 to September 1960. Basistiy retired in September 1960, and in retirement wrote accounts of his service. Over his career he was awarded the Order of Lenin twice, in 1942 and 1945; the Order of the Red Banner four times, in 1937, 1944, 1945, and 1948; the Order of Ushakov Second Class in 1944; and the Order of Kutuzov Second Class in 1945. He was also awarded the Navy Cross from the United States of America in 1943. Basistiy died in Moscow on 20 October 1971, and was buried in the Novodevichy Cemetery. His wife, Tamara Iosifovna, had predeceased him in 1960 and they were buried side by side. In 2011 their daughter, Elena Nikolaevna, was interred in the same plot. The Soviet Navy planned to honour Basistiy by naming an Udaloy II-class destroyer Admiral Basistiy. She was laid down in 1991, but the dissolution of the Soviet Union later that year interrupted her building, and she was scrapped on the slipway in 1994.

== Bibliography ==
- Basistiy, N. E., Battles with the White Guards and the Interventionists on the Volga (1918-1919) (Russian: боях с белогвардейцами и интервентами на Волге (1918—1919 гг.), Boyakh c Belogvardeitsami i interventami na Volge (1918-1919 gg.), Morskoi Sbornik (1968). № 2. pp. 25–31.
- Basistiy, N. E., Sea and Shore (Russian: Море и берег, More i bereg), (1970) Moscow, Voenizdat.
- Basistiy, N. E., Unforgettable Happenings (Russian: Незабываемое бывает, Nezabymaemoe budaet), (1970) Moscow. 1970. No. 5. pp. 171–172.
