= Russian destroyer Admiral Zakharov =

Udaloy-class destroyer of the Russian Navy

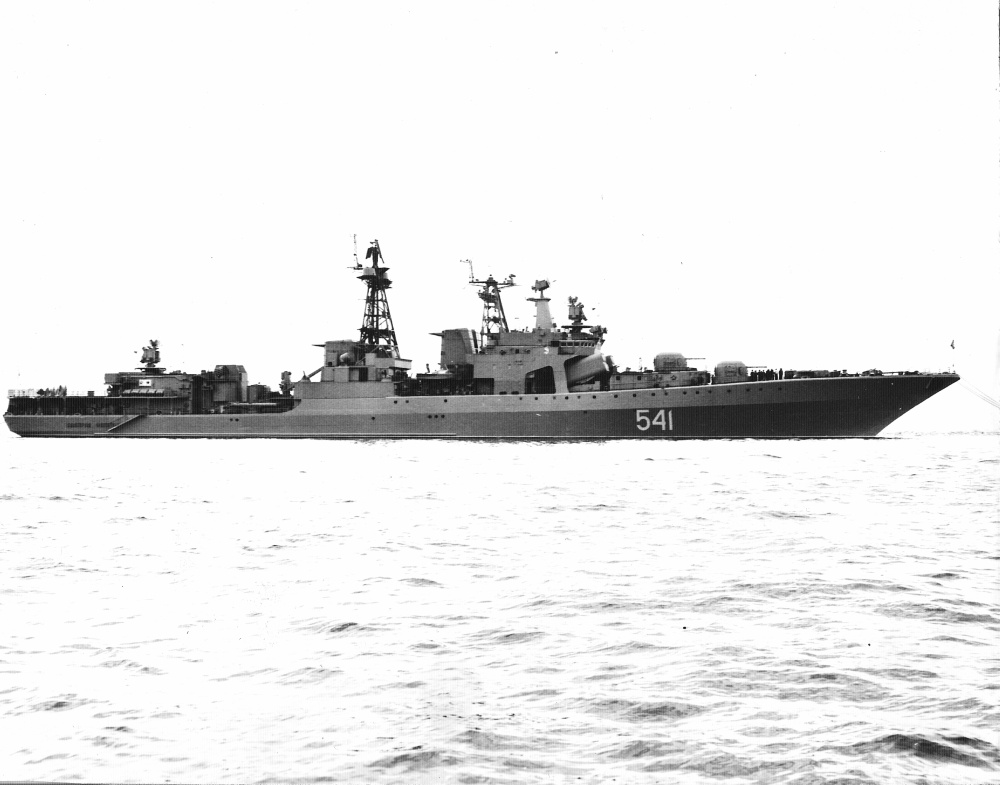
- Admiral Zakharov in 1990

History

Russia
- Name: Admiral Zakharov; (Адмирал Захаров)
- Namesake: Mikhail Zakharov
- Builder: Yantar Shipyard, Kaliningrad
- Laid down: 16 October 1981
- Launched: 4 November 1982
- Commissioned: 30 December 1983
- Decommissioned: 2002
- Home port: Vladivostok
- Identification: Pennant number: 443, 464, 472, 501, 513, 541
- Fate: Scrapped

General characteristics
- Class & type: Udaloy-class destroyer 7,570 tons full load
- Length: 163 m (535 ft)
- Beam: 19.3 m (63 ft)
- Draught: 6.2 m (20 ft)
- Propulsion: 2 shaft COGAG, 2× D090 6.7 MW and 2× DT59 16.7 gas turbines, 120,000 hp 89.456 MW
- Speed: 35 kn (65 km/h; 40 mph)
- Range: 10,500 nmi (19,400 km; 12,100 mi) at 14 kn (26 km/h; 16 mph)
- Complement: 300
- Sensors & processing systems: Radar: MR-760MA Fregat-MA/Top Plate 3-D air search radar and MR-320M Topaz-V/Strut Pair air/surface search radar; Sonar: Horse Tail LF VDS sonar and Horse Jaw bow mounted LF sonar; Fire Control: 2 MR-360 Podkat/Cross Sword SA-N-9 SAM control, 2 3P37/Hot Flash SA-N-11 SAM control, Garpun-BAL SSM targeting
- Electronic warfare & decoys: Bell Squat jammer; Bell Shroud intercept; Bell Crown intercept; 2 × PK-2 decoy RL; 10 × PK-10 decoy RL in later ships
- Armament: 2 × 1 AK-100 100 mm naval guns; 8 (2 × 4) SS-N-14 'Silex' anti-submarine/anti-ship missiles; 64 (8 × 8) VLS cells for SA-N-9 'Gauntlet' surface-to-air missiles; 4 × 6 30 mm AK-630 CIWS; 2 × 1 21KM AA guns; 2 × 4 533 mm torpedo tubes for Type 53 or Type 65 torpedoes; 2 × 12 RBU-6000 anti-submarine rocket launchers
- Aircraft carried: 2 × Ka-27 series helicopters
- Aviation facilities: Helipad and hangar

Admiral Zakharov was a Udaloy-class destroyer of the Russian Navy. She was named after Soviet admiral Mikhail Zakharov.

== Development and design ==
Project 1155 dates to the 1970s when it was concluded that it was too costly to build large-displacement, multi-role combatants. The concept of a specialized surface ship was developed by Soviet designers.

They are 156 m in length, 17.3 m in beam and 6.5 m in draught.

== Construction and career ==
Admiral Zakharov was laid down on 16 October 1981, and launched on 4 November 1982 by Yantar Shipyard in Kaliningrad. She was commissioned on 30 December 1983. On January 18, 1984, the ship was included in the Pacific Fleet. The naval ensign was raised on 25 March 1984.

In 1985, the Admiral Zakharov was considered the best ship of the Baltic Fleet as a part of the Baltic squadron of heterogeneous forces (commander - 2nd rank captain Viktor Vladimirovich Onofriychuk).

In 1987, she made the transition to the Pacific Fleet. From 21 to 25 October 1987, she paid visits to Luanda in Angola, then from November 6 to November 11 to Maputo in Mozambique, from November 17 to November 23 to Victoria, Seychelles, and from November 29 to 3 December the ship made a friendly visit to Bombay in India.

Between 12–16 May 1988 as part of a detachment of ships under the flag of the commander of the Pacific Fleet, Admiral G. A. Khvatov, the ship engaged in technical cooperation and an exchange of visits between the ships of the Soviet Navy and the DPRK and also paid an official visit to Wonsan. In the winter of 1988–1989 the ship undertook various tasks of combat service in the Persian Gulf.

In February 1989, the ship, together with floating base Ivan Kolyshkin, the minesweepers Rear Admiral Pershin, Kharkovsky Komsomolets and Vice-Admiral Zhukov, carried out the mission of protecting peaceful USSR shipping in the Persian Gulf zone.

Arriving at the end of 1988, by 23 February 1989, she escorted six convoys of 15 ships (where the commander of the navigational combat unit, Lieutenant-Commander Alexander Marchenko, distinguished himself).

For the entire time while the ship was part of the 8th operational squadron (autumn 1988–winter 1989), she escorted 21 ships in eight convoys (according to other sources, 53 ships in 23 convoys). The ship was commanded at this time by the captain of the 2nd rank A. V. Piskunov.

From August 1990 to February 1991, the Admiral Zakharov performed combat service in the South China Sea region, temporarily based on Cam Ranh. During this service the crew installed two 2M-7 type machine-gun mounts with 14.5 mm KPV machine guns on the roof of the bridge.

On 17 February 1992, at 11 hours 42 minutes (local time), at the transition to Vladivostok (in the Ussuri Bay, 7.4 kilometers from Cape Sysoev), in the aft engine room of the Admiral Zakharov there was an explosion of a gas turbine plant, which caused a volumetric fire (due to exceeding the maximum speed of the propeller (TV) turbine of the afterburner, it was destroyed and fragments scattered throughout the aft engine room.

One of the fragments broke through the fuel tank (located under the engine) and the bottom of the ship allowing seawater to enter the tank which forced fuel into the aft engine room. As a result of the fire, one crew member died and five were hospitalized with various injuries and burns. The fight against the fire lasted 30 hours.

Repair of the Admiral Zakharov, which almost completely burned out the aft engine room, was deemed inexpedient, and the ship was written off and placed in 2nd category reserve. On 29 September 1994, she was put into dock In Vladivostok for welding to prepare her for the upcoming transfer to the military property sales department for final disposal.

She was scrapped at the Chazhminsky shipyard in the early 2000s.

== Gallery ==
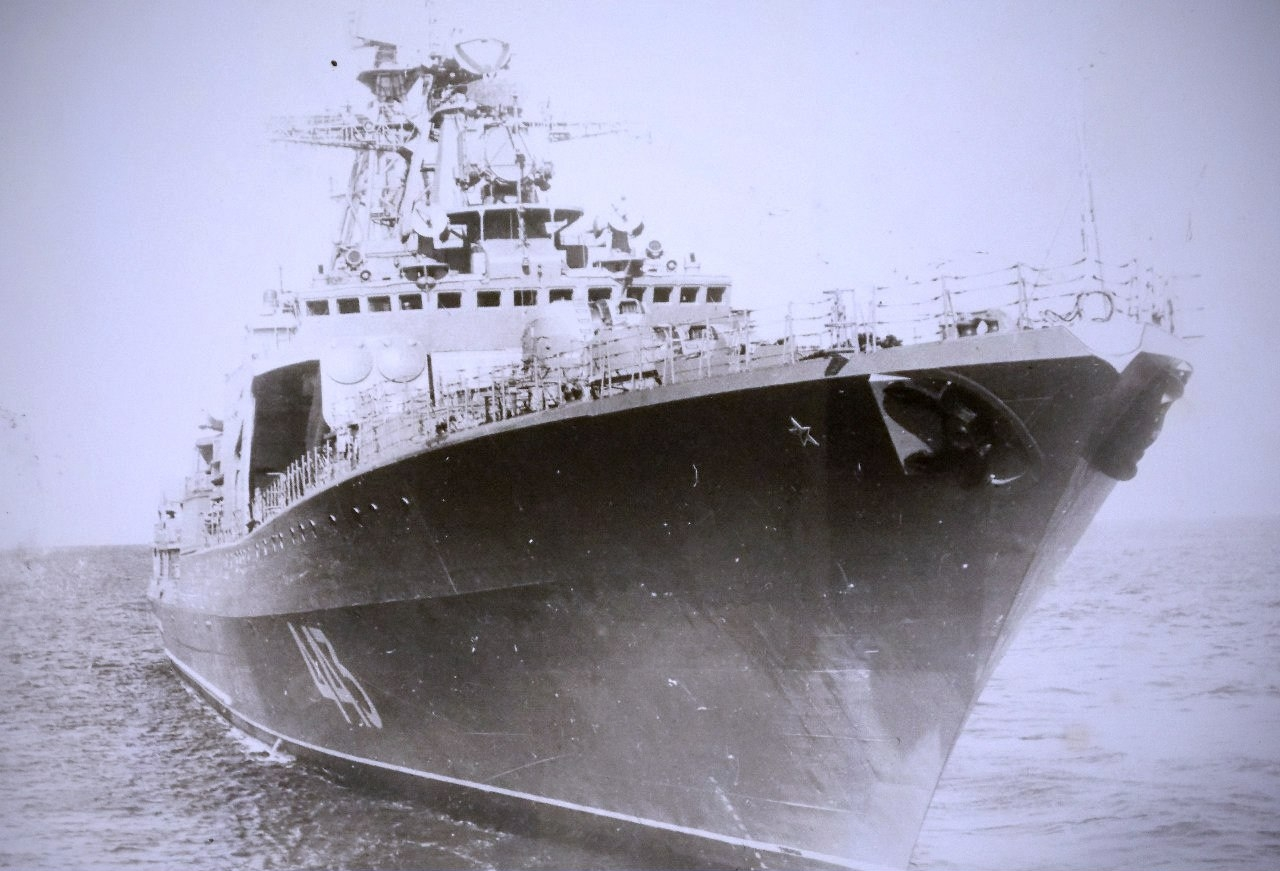
Admiral Zakharov, date unknown.

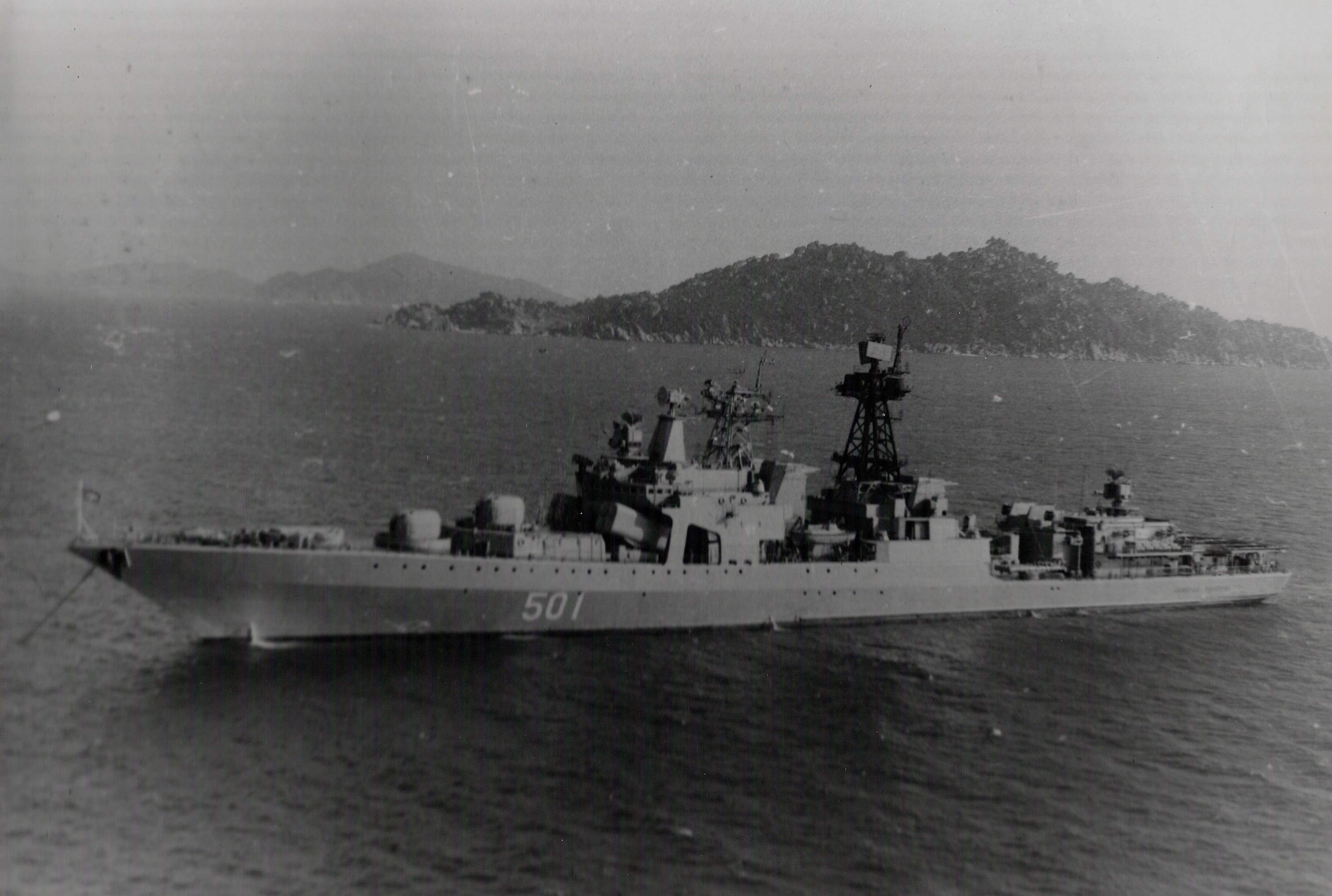
Admiral Zakharov in 1983.

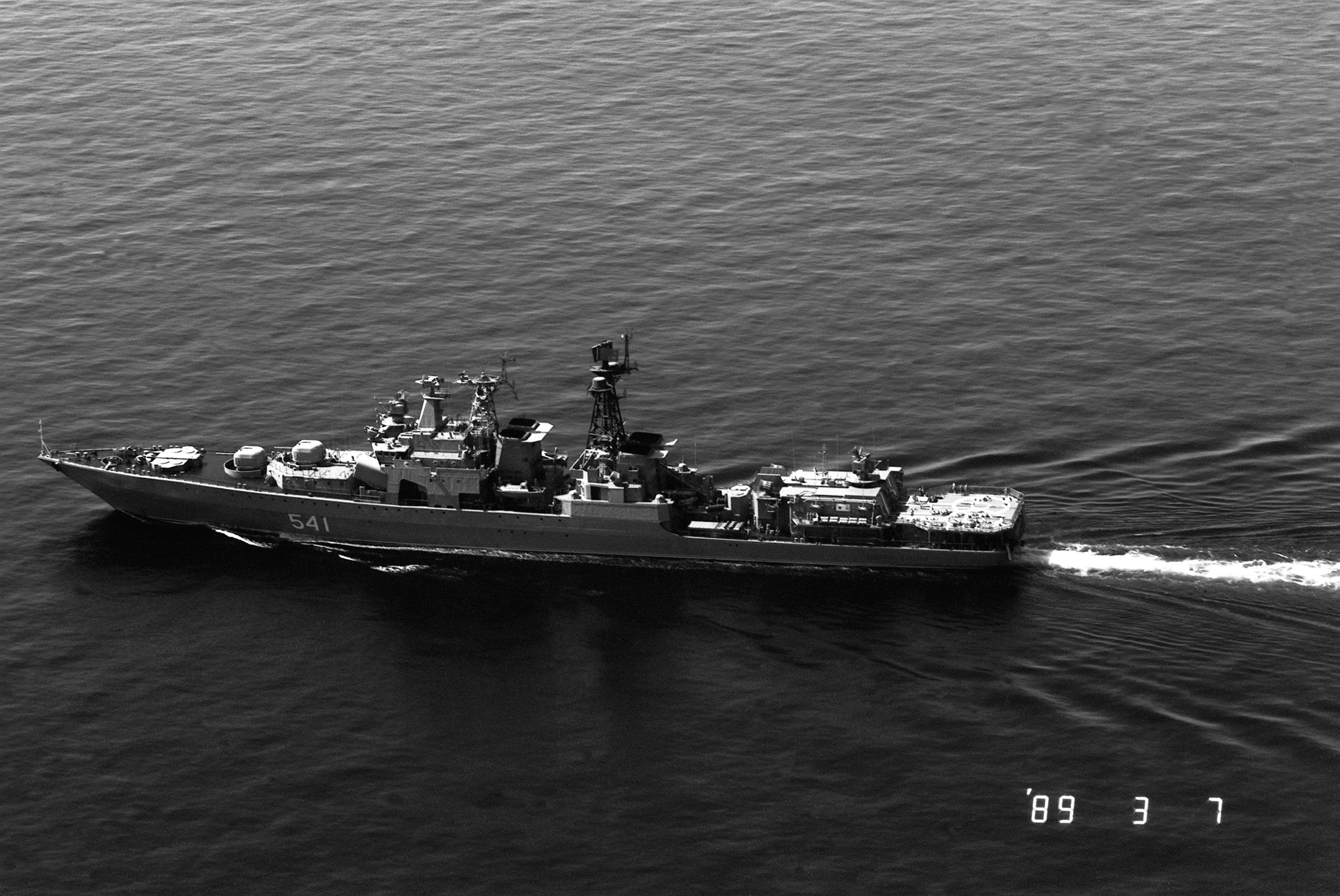
Admiral Zakharov underway on 7 March 1989.

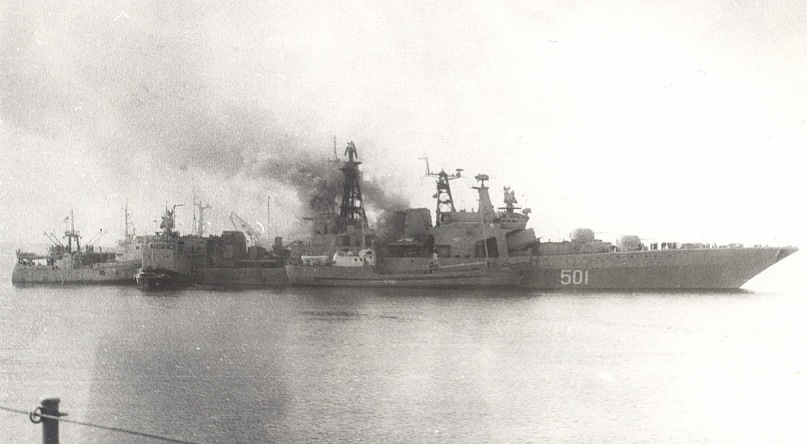
Admiral Zakharov on 17 February 1992.
