= Andrei Chabanenko =

Soviet naval officer

Andrei Trofimovich Chabanenko
- Born: 30 October [O.S. 17 October ] 1909; Kozynka, Verkhnedneprovskiy Uezd, Yekaterinoslav Governorate, Russian Empire (today part of Verkhivtseve, Ukraine)
- Died: 19 December 1986 (aged 77) Moscow, Soviet Union
- Buried: Kuntsevo Cemetery
- Allegiance: Soviet Union
- Branch: Soviet Navy
- Service years: 1927–1976
- Rank: Admiral
- Commands: Northern Fleet
- Awards: Order of Lenin (twice)

Andrei Trofimovich Chabanenko (Russian: Андрей Трофимович Чабаненко; Ukrainian: Андрій Трофимович Чабаненко; 30 October [O.S. 17 October] 1909 – 19 December 1986) was an officer of the Soviet Navy. He rose to the rank of admiral and was commander of the Northern Fleet.

Born in the Russian Empire in 1909, Chabanenko entered the navy in 1927 and after completing his studies, began service with the Pacific Fleet as a submariner. By the outbreak of the Second World War he had graduated to command of his own boat, and then during the war, whole squadrons. Promoted to flag rank in 1944, he took part in the brief Soviet–Japanese War, assisting in the invasion of South Sakhalin shortly before the surrender of Japan. The postwar years were spent combining further advanced studies with the command of several naval bases, before taking command of the Northern Fleet in 1952. He held this post for the next decade, overseeing important improvements and advancements with the introduction of nuclear submarines with greater capabilities than their predecessors. After some time as the Assistant Chief of the General Staff for Maritime Affairs, he became a consulting professor at the Military Academy of the General Staff, before retiring in 1976. He was honoured with numerous awards before his death in 1986, and was further honoured posthumously with the naming of a street in the Northern Fleet's base at Severomorsk, and the Udaloy II-class destroyer Admiral Chabanenko.

== Biography ==
Chabanenko was born on 30 October [O.S. 17 October] 1909 in the village of Kozynka, then part of the Russian Empire (today part of the city of Verkhivtseve, Ukraine). He entered the M.V. Frunze Higher Naval School in 1927, and after graduating, served as an officer aboard submarines of the Black Sea Fleet. He joined the Communist Party of the Soviet Union in 1932, and was promoted to his own commands in 1933, as captain of a submarine in the Pacific Fleet. In 1938 he was further advanced to command of a submarine division. From 1940 to 1945, during the Second World War, he commanded one of the Pacific Fleet's submarine brigades, and on 5 November 1944 was promoted to rear admiral. He saw action in the brief Soviet–Japanese War from August to September 1945, helping to land troops for the Soviet assault on Maoka, part of the invasion of South Sakhalin, and after the war was appointed commander of the Sovgavan Naval Base.

In 1946 Chabanenko took a series of courses at the Naval Academy, and was then assigned to command the South Sakhalin Naval Base. He continued his studies with a secondment in December 1947 to the Military Academy of the General Staff, before joining the Baltic Fleet in 1950 as commander of the Porkkala Naval Base, and as chief of staff of the 8th Fleet. Chabanenko was promoted to vice-admiral on 27 January 1951, and in April 1952 was appointed commander of the Northern Fleet, with the rank of admiral from 3 August 1953 onwards. Chabanenko held the post for the next decade, during which time he oversaw the development of submarine tactics and operations, the introduction of the first nuclear submarines to the fleet, and the beginning of polar and long range submarine voyages. In June 1962 he was appointed Assistant Chief of the General Staff for Maritime Affairs, and in 1972 became a consulting professor at the Military Academy of the General Staff. He retired in November 1976, and died in Moscow on 19 December 1986. He is buried at the Kuntsevo Cemetery.

Chabanenko's namesake, the Udaloy II-class destroyer Admiral Chabanenko, in 2011

Chabanenko was twice awarded the Order of Lenin, the Order of the Red Banner four times, the Order of the Patriotic War First and Second Classes, the Order of the Red Star twice and the Order "For Service to the Homeland in the Armed Forces of the USSR" Third Class, as well as a number of medals. He was further honoured after his death with the naming of the Udaloy II-class destroyer Admiral Chabanenko, launched in 1992 and entering service with the Northern Fleet in 1994, and the naming of a street in Severomorsk after him.
