= Belokamenka, Volgograd Oblast =

Belokamenka Белокаменка
- Selo
- Location within Volgograd Oblast Location within Russia
- Coordinates: 50°33′N 45°49′E
- Country: Russia
- Region: Volgograd Oblast
- District: Staropoltavsky District
- Time zone: UTC+4:00

Belokamenka (Russian: Белокаменка) is a rural locality (a selo) in Ilovatskoye Rural Settlement, Staropoltavsky District, Volgograd Oblast, Russia. The population was 271 as of 2010. There are 9 streets.

== Geography ==
Belokamenka is located in steppe, on the east bank of the Volgograd Reservoir, 61 km northwest of Staraya Poltavka (the district's administrative centre) by road. Ilovatka is the nearest rural locality.
