= Nikolay Krylov (marshal) =

Soviet military commander (1903–1972)

Nikolay Ivanovich Krylov
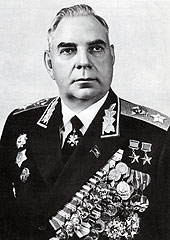
- Krylov c. 1960s
- Native name: Никола́й Ива́нович Крыло́в
- Born: Nikolai Ivanovich Krylov; 29 April 1903; Balashovsky Uyezd, Saratov Governorate, Russian Empire (present-day Tamalinsky District, Penza Oblast, Russia)
- Died: 9 February 1972 (aged 68) Moscow, Russian SFSR, Soviet Union
- Buried: Kremlin Wall Necropolis
- Allegiance: Soviet Union
- Rank: Marshal of the Soviet Union
- Commands: 21st Army; 5th Army; Far Eastern Military District; 15th Army; Ural Military District; Leningrad Military District; Moscow Military District
- Conflicts: World War II

Nikolai Ivanovich Krylov (Russian: Никола́й Ива́нович Крыло́в; 29 April 1903 – 9 February 1972) was a Russian Marshal of the Soviet Union (from 1962). He was commander of the Strategic Missile Troops from 1963 to 1972.

== Early life ==
Krylov was born into a family of rural teachers. He joined the Komsomol in 1918, and was the secretary of the district Komsomol cell and a fighter of the volunteer party Komsomol Red Guard detachment.

During the Russian Civil War, he tried to join the Red Army. At the beginning of 1919, he was enrolled in the aviation division of the Southern Front, but after a few days he fell seriously ill and was left with his parents. At the same time, he passed the exam for the school course as an external student and received a certificate of graduation from the 2nd stage school.

== Military career ==
=== Russian Civil War ===
In April 1919, at the age of 16, he achieved enrollment in the Red Army. After successfully completing the Saratov infantry and machine gun courses in 1920, he was appointed commander of a rifle platoon, then a half-company of riflemen in the 28th Rifle Division named after V.M. Azin. In the ranks of the 11th Army, he fought on the Southern Front and took part in the occupation of Azerbaijan Democratic Republic in the Soviet-Georgian war of 1921. On the same year, he was transferred to the Russian Far East, where aged 19, he was appointed commander of a rifle battalion in the 3rd Verkhne-Uda Regiment of the 1st Pacific Division of the People's Revolutionary Army in the Far Eastern Republic. He participated in the liberation of Spassk, Nikolsk-Ussuriysky and Vladivostok from the White Army.

=== Post-civil war ===
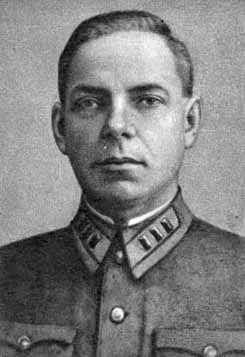
Nikolay Krylov (1940)

After the end of the civil war, Krylov remained in the Red Army and continued to serve in the Far East, where he commanded a battalion. From 1923, he served as assistant chief of staff of a rifle regiment. Krylov joined the Communist Party of the Soviet Union in 1927 and graduated from Advanced Training Courses for the Command Staff of the Red Army in August 1928.

From 1929, he served as chief of staff of a rifle regiment in the 1st Pacific Rifle Division. Krylov commanded the Blagoveshchensk Fortified Region from 1931. In 1936, he was appointed as chief of staff of the fortified region. Krylov was assigned as head of the department of Osoaviakhim in Stavropol in 1939. In May 1941, he was appointed chief of staff of the Danube Fortified Region on the southern section of the Soviet-Romanian border in the Odessa Military District.

=== World War II ===
==== Eastern Front ====
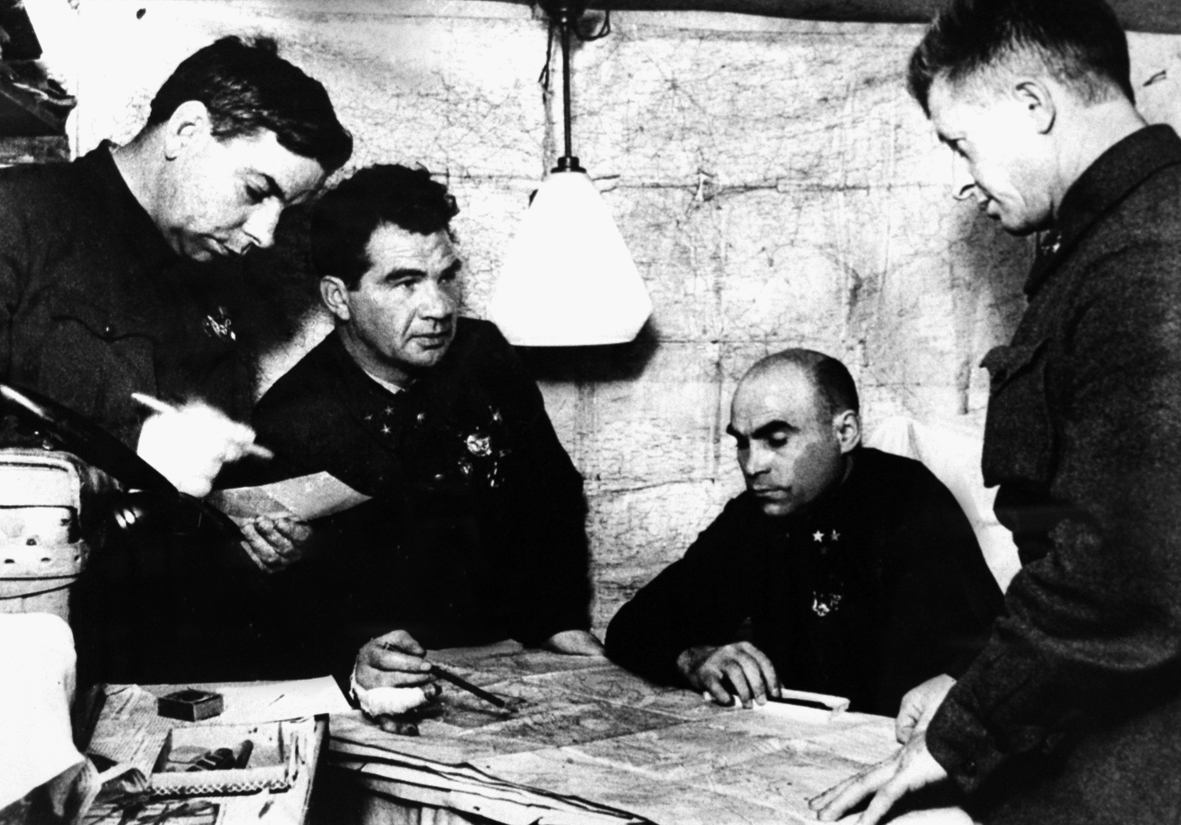
Krylov (left) at the 62nd Army command post in Stalingrad in December 1942.

Following the outbreak of Operation Barbarossa in June 1941, Krylov led the fight against Romanian troops who tried unsuccessfully to cross the Soviet border. When the threat of enemy occupation loomed, the Soviet troops were withdrawn from the border and Krylov became the deputy chief of the coastal army's operational department in July 1941.

Since there was a lack of commanders in the besieged Odessa, he became chief of the operational department of the army on 11 August and the chief of staff of the coastal army on 21 August. He remained in this position from the beginning to the end of the defense of Odessa and Sevastopol. During a visit outside the dugout with two others, the Germans fired off mortar rounds, killing one of the men and severely wounding Krylov on 8 January 1942. He would suffer from this injury for the rest of his life. On 27 December 1941, he was appointed major general and was evacuated from the city in the last days of its defense by a Soviet Navy submarine. He was in the reserve for more than a month, during which time he wrote a report on the defense of Sevastopol.

In August 1942, Krylov was appointed Chief of Staff of the 1st Guards Army. Just a few days later, he was urgently summoned to Stalingrad and appointed chief of staff of the 62nd Army, which fought many months of street battles in the city during the battle of Stalingrad. Until the arrival of the new commander-in-chief Vasily Chuikov, he commanded the army in the battle for the city for more than a month. There he became a close friend with Chuikov and was also member of the Military Council of the Front led by Nikita Khrushchev, who was his superior.

After the victory at Stalingrad, General Krylov was appointed commander of the 3rd Reserve Army of the Headquarters of the Supreme High Command in May 1943. From July 1943, he served as commander of the 21st and 5th Armies of the Western Front. During this time, his armies participated in the Orsha and Vitebsk offensives in 1943. Krylov's army was transferred to 3rd Belorussian Front. Commanding this army, Krylov successfully led them during Operation Bagration, when his army units successfully advanced near Vitebsk, Orsha and Minsk, and stormed Vilnius and repulsed enemy counter-attacks near Kaunas. For excellent command of troops, by the decree of the Presidium of the Supreme Soviet of the USSR dated 19 April 1945, Krylov was awarded the title of Hero of the Soviet Union and was promoted to Colonel General on 15 July 1944.

Due to his old injury, he was in a Moscow hospital for two months at the end of 1944 and then returned to command of his army units during the East Prussian offensive.

==== Soviet-Japanese War ====
After the victory over Germany, the 5th Army in full strength was transferred to the Far East, where it became part of the 1st Far Eastern Front commanded by Marshal Kirill Meretskov. Kyrlov led the 5th Army in the Soviet invasion of Manchuria in August 1945, where he led the army to break through the deeply echeloned border defensive line in Manchuria, and liberated the cities of Muling and Mudanjiang.

For the successful defeat of the opposing enemy groupings in this operation, Krylov was awarded the title Hero of the Soviet Union for the second time.

=== Post-war ===
From October 1945, Krylov served as deputy commander of the Primorsky Military District. From January 1947, he was appointed as commander of the Far Eastern Military District. In March 1953, the district was reorganized into the army, which was included in the new united Far Eastern Military District. Krylov commanded this army for about six months, before being appointed as first deputy commander of the Far Eastern Military District in September 1953. At the same time, on 18 September 1953, he was awarded the military rank of General of the Army. From January 1956, he served as commander of the Ural Military District and from 1958, commander of the Leningrad Military District. In 1960, he was appointed as commander of the Moscow Military District. Krylov became Marshal of the Soviet Union on 28 April 1962.

In March 1963, he was appointed Commander-in-Chief of the Strategic Rocket Forces. He was responsible for its founding, which had to be brought into combat readiness within a short time and whose new technology had to be tested in cooperation with the designers. The development of missile forces was also accelerated by the Cuban Missile Crisis. Krylov, missile designer Mikhail Yangel and a number of other specialists agreed that it was necessary to build new underground launch pads and put new missile complexes into operation. Krylov's duties also included inspections of all parts and departments of the missile forces. He was also responsible for building military towns where military personnel and their families lived.

Krylov died on 9 February 1972, at the age of 68, just nine days after the death of Marshal Matvei Zakharov. The urn containing his ashes is buried in the Kremlin Wall Necropolis.

== Honours and awards ==
Krylov received the following honours and awards.

Soviet Union

Hero of the Soviet Union, twice (19 April 1945, 8 September 1945)
Order of Lenin, four times (8 October 1942, 21 February 1945, 19 April 1945, 28 March 1963)
Order of the October Revolution (22 February 1968)
Order of the Red Banner, four times (10 February 1942, 4 February 1943, 3 November 1944, 20 June 1949)
Order of Suvorov, 1st class (4 July 1944)
Order of Kutuzov, 1st class (28 September 1943)
Medal "For the Defence of Odessa" (1942)
Medal "For the Defence of Sevastopol" (1942)
Medal "For the Defence of Stalingrad" (1942)
Medal "For the Capture of Königsberg" (1945)
Medal "For the Victory over Germany in the Great Patriotic War 1941–1945" (1945)
Medal "For the Victory over Japan" (1945)
Jubilee Medal "Twenty Years of Victory in the Great Patriotic War 1941-1945" (1965)
Jubilee Medal "In Commemoration of the 100th Anniversary of the Birth of Vladimir Ilyich Lenin" (1969)
Jubilee Medal "XX Years of the Workers' and Peasants' Red Army" (1938)
Jubilee Medal "30 Years of the Soviet Army and Navy" (1948)
Jubilee Medal "40 Years of the Armed Forces of the USSR" (1958)
Jubilee Medal "50 Years of the Armed Forces of the USSR" (1968)
Medal "For the Development of Virgin Lands" (1956)

Foreign

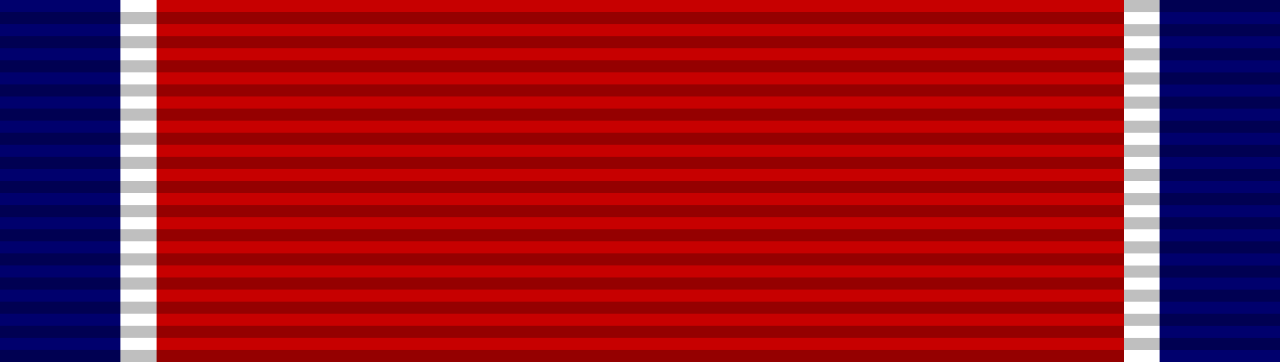
Medal of Sino-Soviet Friendship, twice (China)
Order of the Cloud and Banner with Special Grand Cordon (Republic of China)
Medal “For Strengthening Friendship in Arms”, Golden class (Czechoslovakia)
Commander of the Legion of Honour (France)
Croix de Guerre 1939–1945 (France)
Order of Sukhbaatar (Mongolia)
Medal for the Liberation of Korea (North Korea)
Commander's Cross with Star of the Order of Polonia Restituta (Poland)
Brotherhood of Arms Medal (Poland)
