= Medal "For the Defence of Sevastopol" =

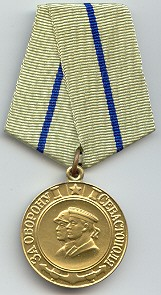
- Medal "For the Defence of Sevastopol" (obverse)
- Type: Campaign medal
- Awarded for: Participation in the defence of Sevastopol
- Presented by: USSR
- Eligibility: Citizens of the Soviet Union
- Status: No longer awarded
- Established: December 22, 1942

Highlights
- Total: 52,540
- Ribbon of the Medal "For the Defence of Sevastopol"

Precedence
- Next (higher): Medal "For the Defence of Odessa"
- Next (lower): Medal "For the Defence of Stalingrad"

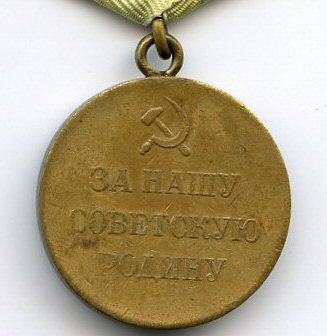
Reverse of the Medal "For the Defence of Sevastopol"

The Medal "For the Defence of Sevastopol" (Russian: Медаль «За оборону Севастополя») was a World War II campaign medal of the Soviet Union established on December 22, 1942 by decree of the Presidium of the Supreme Soviet of the USSR to reward the participants of the defence of the port city of Sevastopol against the armed forces of Nazi Germany and Romania. The medal's statute was amended on July 18, 1980 by decree of the Presidium of the Supreme Soviet of the USSR № 2523-X.

== Medal statute ==
The Medal "For the Defence of Sevastopol" was awarded to all participants in the defence of Sevastopol - soldiers of the Red Army, Navy and troops of the NKVD, as well as persons from the civilian population who took part in the defence of Sevastopol during its siege by German and Romanian forces.

Award of the medal was made on behalf of the Presidium of the Supreme Soviet of the USSR on the basis of documents attesting to actual participation in the defence of Sevastopol issued by the unit commander, the chief of the military medical establishment or by a relevant provincial or municipal authority. Serving military personnel received the medal from their unit commander, retirees from military service received the medal from a regional, municipal or district military commissioner in the recipient's community, members of the civilian population, participants in the defence of Sevastopol received their medal from regional or city Councils of People's Deputies.

The Medal "For the Defence of Sevastopol" was worn on the left side of the chest and in the presence of other awards of the USSR, was located immediately after the Medal "For the Defence of Odessa". If worn in the presence of Orders or medals of the Russian Federation, the latter have precedence.

== Medal description ==
The Medal "For the Defence of Sevastopol" was a 32mm in diameter circular brass medal with a raised rim. In the center of the obverse, a 22mm in diameter convex medallion bearing the overlapping left profile busts of a red sailor over a helmeted red soldier. At the bottom, protruding below the edge of the central medallion, the bottom of a naval anchor and the breeches or two muzzle loading cannons (crossing under the medallion); at the top, protruding from the central medallion, the muzzles of the two cannons, in between them, a 5mm wide frame bearing a relief five-pointed star. ALong the medal circumference, between the edge of the central medallion and the medal's rim, the relief inscription, on the left side "FOR THE DEFENSE" and on the right side "SEVASTOPOL" (Russian: «ЗА ОБОРОНУ») and (Russian: «СЕВАСТОПОЛЯ»). On the reverse near the top, the relief image of the hammer and sickle, below the image, the relief inscription in three rows "FOR OUR SOVIET MOTHERLAND" (Russian: «ЗА НАШУ СОВЕТСКУЮ РОДИНУ»).

The Medal "For the Defence of Sevastopol" was secured by a ring through the medal suspension loop to a standard Soviet pentagonal mount covered by a 24mm wide olive green silk moiré ribbon with a 2mm central dark blue stripe.

== Recipients (partial list) ==
The individuals below were all recipients of the Medal "For the Defence of Sevastopol".

- Anatoly Petrovich Alexandrov
- Semyon Budyonny
- Yakov Timofeyevich Cherevichenko
- Archil Gelovani
- Vasily Glagolev
- Hovhannes Stepani Isakov
- Yevgeny Khaldei
- Nikolay Krylov
- Gordey Ivanovich Levchenko
- Filipp Sergeyevich Oktyabrskiy
- Lyudmila Pavlichenko
- Ivan Yefimovich Petrov
- Vasily Ivanovich Petrov
- Vitaly Popkov
- Michael Petrovich Tsiselsky
- Lev Anatolevich Vladimirsky
- Aleksey Vysotsky

== See also ==
- Awards and decorations of the Soviet Union
- Sevastopol
- Hero City
- Siege of Sevastopola
