= Medal "For the Defence of Odessa" =

Military decoration of the Soviet Union

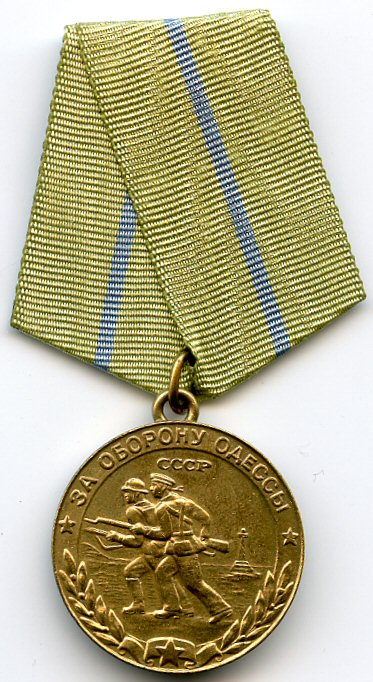
- Medal "For the Defence of Odessa" (obverse)
- Type: Campaign medal
- Awarded for: Participation in the defence of Odessa
- Presented by: USSR
- Eligibility: Citizens of the Soviet Union
- Status: No longer awarded
- Established: December 22, 1942

Highlights
- Total: 38,000
- Ribbon of the Medal "For the Defence of Odessa"

Precedence
- Next (higher): Medal "For the Defence of Moscow"
- Next (lower): Medal "For the Defence of Sevastopol"

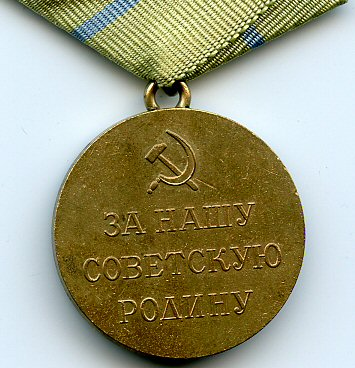
Reverse of the Medal "For the Defence of Odessa"

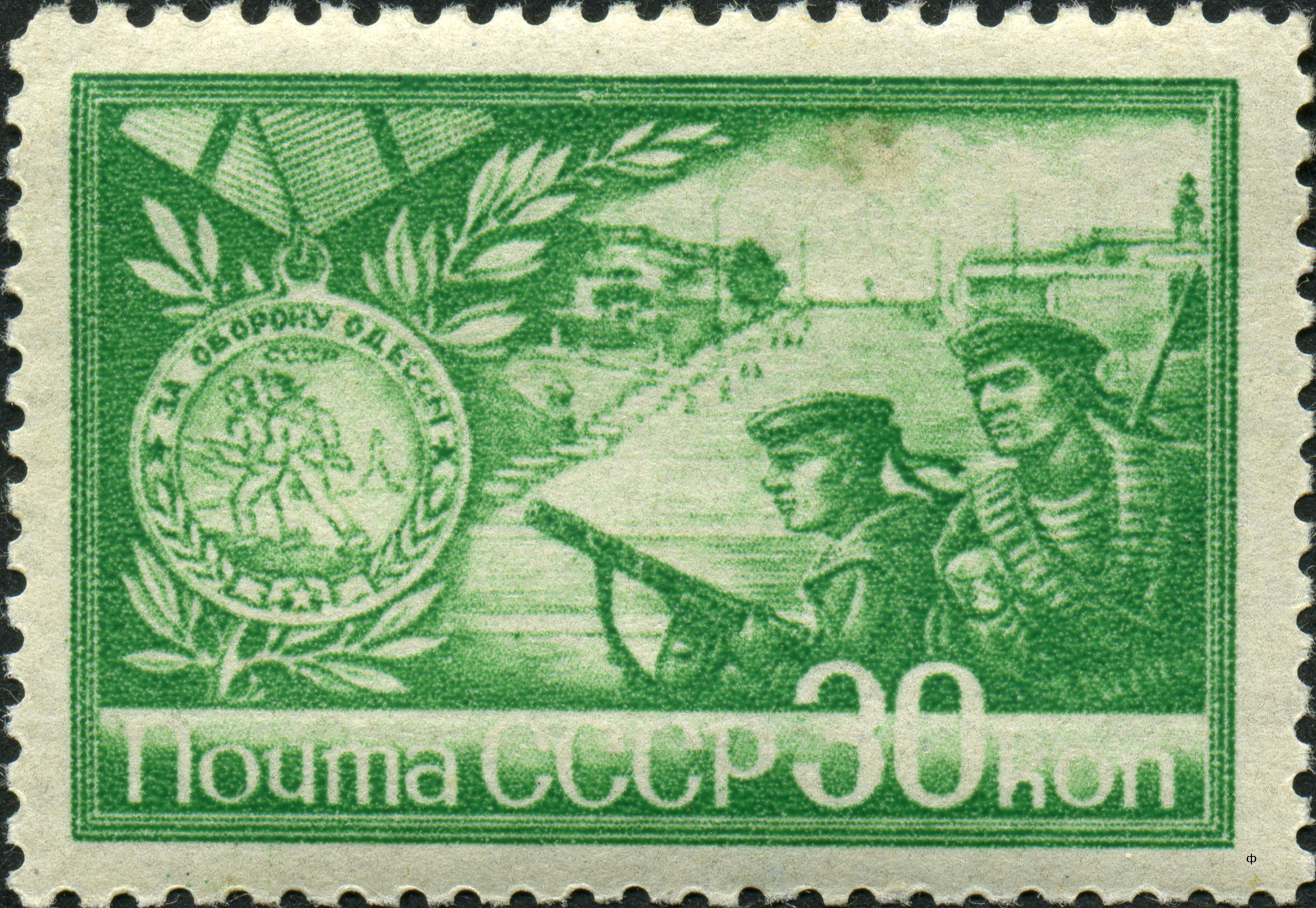
The medal on a 1944 postage stamp

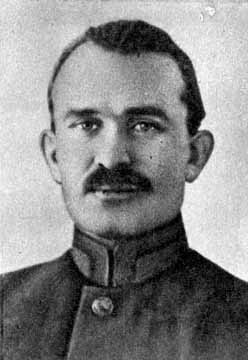
Admiral Sergey Gorshkov, a recipient of the Medal "For the Defence of Odessa"

The Medal "For the Defence of Odessa" (Russian: Медаль «За оборону Одессы»; Ukrainian: Медаль «За оборону Одеси», romanised: Medal «Za oboronu Odesy») was a World War II campaign medal of the Soviet Union established on December 22, 1942 by decree of the Presidium of the Supreme Soviet of the USSR to reward the participants of the defence of the port city of Odessa from the Axis armed forces of Romania and Nazi Germany. The medal's statute was amended on July 18, 1980 by decree of the Presidium of the Supreme Soviet of the USSR № 2523-X.

== Medal statute ==
The Medal "For the Defence of Odessa" was awarded to all participants in the defence of Odessa - soldiers of the Red Army, Navy and troops of the NKVD, as well as persons from the civilian population who took part in the defence of Odessa during its siege by German and Romanian forces.

Award of the medal was made on behalf of the Presidium of the Supreme Soviet of the USSR on the basis of documents attesting to actual participation in the defence of Odessa issued by the unit commander, the chief of the military medical establishment or by a relevant provincial or municipal authority. Serving military personnel received the medal from their unit commander, retirees from military service received the medal from a regional, municipal or district military commissioner in the recipient's community, members of the civilian population, participants in the defence of Odessa received their medal from regional or city Councils of People's Deputies. Each medal came with an "attestation of award" certificate.

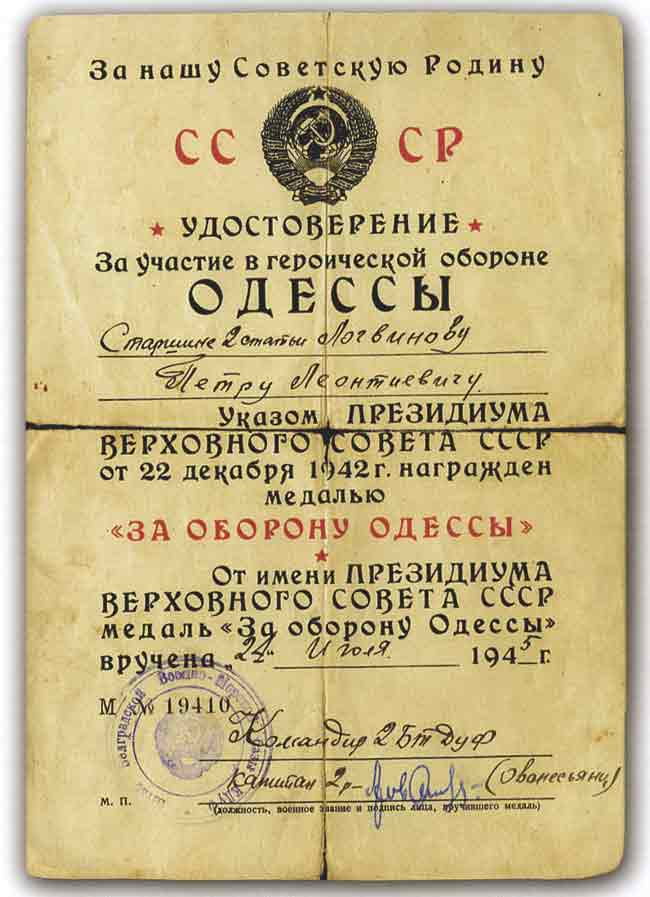
Attestation of award certificate for the Medal "For the Defence of Odessa"

The Medal "For the Defence of Odessa" was worn on the left side of the chest and in the presence of other awards of the USSR, was located immediately after the Medal "For the Defence of Moscow". If worn in the presence of Orders or medals of the Russian Federation, the latter have precedence.

== Medal description ==
The Medal "For the Defence of Odessa" was a 32mm in diameter circular brass medal with a raised rim. On the obverse in the background, the seashore and a distant lighthouse at right, in the centre, the image of a red soldier and a red sailor marching towards the left their rifles at the ready; above the servicemen, the relief inscription "USSR" (Russian: «СССР»). A circular band following the medal's entire circumference bears the relief inscription "FOR THE DEFENCE OF ODESSA" (Russian: «ЗА ОБОРОНУ ОДЕССЫ») at its top, at both ends of the inscription, relief five-pointed stars. On the same band at bottom centre, a five-pointed star over a ribbon superimposed over the crossing point of laurel and oak branches going up the band to the two five-pointed stars near the upper inscription. On the reverse near the top, the relief image of the hammer and sickle, below the image, the relief inscription in three rows "FOR OUR SOVIET MOTHERLAND" (Russian: «ЗА НАШУ СОВЕТСКУЮ РОДИНУ»).

The Medal "For the Defence of Odessa" was secured by a ring through the medal suspension loop to a standard Soviet pentagonal mount covered by a 24mm wide olive green silk moiré ribbon with a 2mm central light blue stripe.

== Recipients (partial list) ==
The individuals below were all recipients of the Medal "For the Defence of Odessa".

- Marshal of the Soviet Union Rodion Yakovlevich Malinovsky
- Admiral of the Fleet Sergey Georgiyevich Gorshkov
- Admiral Gordey Ivanovich Levchenko
- Admiral Filipp Sergeyevich Oktyabrskiy
- Army General Ivan Yefimovich Petrov
- Vice Admiral Gavriil Zhukov
- War correspondent Konstantin Mikhailovich Simonov
- Marshal of the Soviet Union Vasily Ivanovich Petrov
- Army General Ivan Vladimirovich Tyulenev
- Admiral Lev Anatolevich Vladimirsky
- Major Michael Petrovich Tsiselsky
- Major Raul–Yuri Georgievich Ervier
- Marshal of the Soviet Union Semyon Mikhailovich Budyonny
- Marshal of the Soviet Union Vasily Ivanovich Petrov
- Marshal of the Soviet Union Nikolay Ivanovich Krylov
- Colonel Aleksej Vladimirovich Vysotsky
- Colonel General Vasilii Vasil'evich Yermachenkov
- War correspondent Boris Leont'evich Gorbatov
- Major Alexandr Nikolaevich Mal'skii
- Vice-admiral Aleksandr Sergeyevich Frolov
- Captain of State Security Vladimir Aleksandrovich Molodtsov
- Guards Junior Lieutenant Sergey Anfinogenovich Zudlov
- Captain Lieutenant Grigorii Mikhailovich Pozhenyan
- Junior Lieutenant Vladimir Izrailevich Peller
- Partisan leader Yakov Yakovlevich Gordienko
- Major Lyudmila Pavlichenko

== See also ==
- Awards and decorations of the Soviet Union
- Odessa
- Hero City
- Siege of Odessa
