= Gordey Levchenko =

Soviet admiral (1897–1981)

Gordey Ivanovich Levchenko
- Born: 1 February 1897; Dubrovka, Zhitomir Oblast, Russian Empire
- Died: 26 May 1981 (aged 84); Moscow, USSR
- Burial place: Novodevichy Cemetery
- Military career
- Allegiance: Russian Empire; Soviet Union
- Branch: Imperial Russian Navy; Soviet Navy
- Service years: 1913–1960
- Rank: Admiral
- Commands: Baltic Fleet
- Conflicts: World War I Russian Civil War; World War II
- Awards: Order of Lenin (three times); Order of the Red Banner (four times); Order of Ushakov (twice); Order of the Red Star

Gordey Ivanovich Levchenko (Russian: Гордей Иванович Левченко; 1 February 1897 – 26 May 1981) was a Soviet naval commander and admiral from 1944.

== Biography ==
Born at Dubrovka, Ukraine, a part of the Russian Empire, in 1897, Levchenko joined the Imperial Russian Navy in 1913. He graduated from training in 1914 and in 1916 graduated as a non-commissioned artillery officer from the Kronstadt class. He participated in World War I, the October Revolution and the Russian Civil War. He was involved in the storming the Winter Palace, and fought against the White forces of General Nikolai Yudenich. Levchenko became a member of the Russian Communist Party (b) 1919 and in took part in suppressing the mutiny at the Krasnaya Gorka fort and the Kronstadt rebellion.

Levchenko graduated from the Naval School in 1922 and was assigned to serve with the Baltic Fleet. In 1927 he was appointed to command the destroyer Artyom. In 1930, after completing courses at the Naval Academy, he took command of the cruiser Aurora and a detachment of training ships. Between January 1932 and January 1933 he commanded the Caspian Flotilla, and from January 1933 to August 1935 he commanded the battleship division of the Baltic Fleet. In August 1935 he was demoted for the loss of the submarine B-3 during exercises. In 1935–37, he commanded the destroyer squadron of the Black Sea Fleet.

From August 1937 to January 1938 Levchenko was Chief of Staff of the Baltic Fleet, and from January 1938 to April 1939 commanded the Baltic Fleet. On 3 April 1939 he was promoted to "flagman 1st rank" and became Deputy Commissar of the Navy. On 4 June 1940 he was promoted to vice admiral, and went to the Southern Front during the Second World War, where he participated in the battles of Odessa, Mykolaiv and Sevastopol. On 22 October 1941 he took command of the troops in the Crimea, until early November 1941. With the fall of Kerch to Axis forces that month, Levchenko was arrested on a charge of inciting defeatism and panic. Grigory Kulik testified against him, and Levchenko was sentenced to 10 years in prison on 25 January 1942. He was pardoned on 31 January, though he was demoted to captain 1st rank on 19 March 1942.

Assigned to the Baltic area of operations, Levchenko led an amphibious landing operation against the Finnish island of Someri in the Gulf of Finland on 8 July 1942. The assault was repulsed with heavy losses for the Soviet forces. From late 1942 to 1944 he was base commander in Leningrad, and the naval base at Kronstadt. He was promoted to kontr admiral on 18 April 1943 and participated in the defence of the city during its long siege. Levchenko arranged the transportation and supply of troops during the blockade. He was restored to the rank of vice admiral on 22 February 1944, and was advanced to the rank of full admiral on 25 September 1944.

From May 1946 Levchenko served as commander of the South-Baltic Fleet (4th Navy), then as deputy minister and admiral inspector of the Navy from 1953 to 1960. Between 1956 and 1958 he was deputy commander-in-chief of the Navy for combat training. From 1958 he was part of the Group of Inspectors General of the Ministry of Defence. Levchenko retired from service in September 1960. His memoir «Годы огневые» (The Fiery Years) appeared in the same year. He died in Moscow on 26 May 1981 and was buried at the Novodevichy Cemetery.

== Honours and awards ==
- Three Orders of Lenin
- Order of the Red Banner, four times
- Order of Ushakov, 1st class, twice
- Order of the Red Star, twice
- Jubilee Medal "In Commemoration of the 100th Anniversary since the Birth of Vladimir Il'ich Lenin"
- Medal "For the Defence of Leningrad"
- Medal "For the Defence of Odessa"
- Medal "For the Defence of Sevastopol"
- Medal "For the Victory over Germany in the Great Patriotic War 1941–1945"
- Jubilee Medal "Twenty Years of Victory in the Great Patriotic War 1941-1945"
- Jubilee Medal "Thirty Years of Victory in the Great Patriotic War 1941-1945"
- Jubilee Medal "XX Years of the Workers' and Peasants' Red Army"
- Jubilee Medal "30 Years of the Soviet Army and Navy"
- Jubilee Medal "40 Years of the Armed Forces of the USSR"
- Jubilee Medal "50 Years of the Armed Forces of the USSR"
- Jubilee Medal "60 Years of the Armed Forces of the USSR"

The Udaloy-class destroyer Admiral Levchenko, is named after Gordey Ivanovich Levchenko.
