= Aleksey Vysotsky =

Soviet writer (1919–1977)

Aleksey Vladimirovich Vysotsky (Алексе́й Владимирович Высоцкий) (18 July 1919 in Kiev – 28 October 1977 in Moscow) was a Soviet Union journalist and author, as well as a hero of World War II who attained the rank of Colonel.

== Biography ==
=== Childhood ===
Alexey Vysotsky was born in Kiev into an educated Jewish family. His father was Volf Shliomovich Vysotsky (born 1889 in Brest-Litovsk— died 1962 in Moscow) mentioned as "Velvl" in a song Здравствуйте, моё почтенье by his nephew Vladimir Vysotsky), who was from a family of glass blowers. Volf had studied in a commercial school in Lublin from where he moved in 1911 to live in Kiev and study at the Kiev branch of the Odessa commercial institute contemporarily with the Soviet journalist, playwright, and short story writer Isaac Babel, then studied with the faculty of law of Kiev University. During Lenin's New Economic Policy he organised a workshop for manufacture of theatrical make-up and a law office. Alexey Vysotsky's mother, Dora Ovseevna Vysotsky (née Dora Ovseevna Bronstein, the foster daughter of physician to the Kremlin, Lev Grigorievich Levin (Note: Lev Grigorievich Levin was the personal physician for the family of the poet Boris Pasternak, Maxim Gorky, Vyacheslav Molotov, and Vladimir Lenin. Because the military collegium of the Supreme Court of the USSR ruled that Levin had participated in a Trotskyist conspiracy to kill Gorky, members of the Communist Party of the Soviet Union, and the government of the Soviet Union; Levin was executed by gun shot in 1938.)) was born 1891 in Zhytomyr and died 1970 in Kiev. She was the birth daughter of a deceased teacher at the state Jewish school, and finished her coursework to qualify as a physician's assistant (Feldsher) and worked as a pharmacist, and subsequently as a cosmetician. In 1926 the family relocated to Moscow; after the divorce of his parents Alexey Vysotsky initially lived in Moscow with his father, but beginning in the 1930s relocated to Kiev with his mother.

During his school days Vysotsky was friends with Gulya Korolyova and her future husband, Alyosha Pyatakov (the son of Georgy Pyatakov, who was tried for anti-Soviet activity, sentenced to death and executed in 1937), his memoirs were included in the novel The Fourth Height by Yelena Ilyina.

=== Red Army service during the German-Soviet War ===
In 1939 Vysotsky studied at the Podolsk artillery school. He was called to active duty in the Red Army that same year as the commander of an artillery platoon of 165th Howitzer Artillery Regiment, which took part in operations of the Soviet-Finnish Winter War. In 1941, after completing school he participated in the German-Soviet War (Eastern Front of World War II). As a part of 18th Guards Artillery Regiment he participated in defense of Odessa, Kerch and Sevastopol, as well as military operations on Don River and in the North Caucasus. He was then ordered to join the artillery battery of 265th Artillery Regiment of 3rd Ukrainian Front. In the autumn of 1943 he was promoted to Lieutenant Colonel, serving first as Chief of Staff of 124th Howitzer Artillery Brigade of the 20th Heavy Artillery Division reserves at General headquarters and then with the 6th Artillery Division of the Reserve Supreme Main Command (RVGK) on the 1st Belorussian Front. He participated in the liberation of Ukraine and Poland from German forces, as well as the final capture of Berlin. He appeared several times in war reports from the front, as printed in the newspaper Krasnaya Zvezda (Red Star). He was awarded the Order of the Red Banner three times for extraordinary accomplishments of military valor during combat operations, including for the defense of Odessa in 1941 and the defense of Sevastopol in 1942.

=== Post-German-Soviet War service ===
After the termination of the German-Soviet War military operations, he remained on active service in Germany. In 1949 he was posted to serve as commanding officer of the Haisyn operations section in Ukraine. In 1951 he was posted to Mukachevo, Ukraine where he studied philology at Uzhhorod State University. In 1956 he relocated to Moscow at the Lomonosov Moscow State University, where he finished a degree in journalism. He was demobilized in 1959 with the rank of colonel.

== Publications ==
Alexey Vysotsky was the author of four books on military subjects, including the collection of stories "И пусть наступит утро" (And let it be morning) about his military commander and Hero of the Soviet Union, artilleryman N. Bogdanova's actions during the defense of Odessa and Sevastopol; Дороги огненной земли (Roads of the fiery earth) about the defense of Kerch; Горсть земли (Handful of earth) about the defense of Odessa; and Горный цветок (Mountain Flower) about the struggle of Soviet border guards with bandits in the post-war period.

== Discographic contributions ==
In 1962 Alexey Vysotsky produced the first professional-quality tape recording of his nephew, Vladimir Vysotsky, at the House of Technology of the Ministry of River Fleets of the Russian Soviet Federative Socialist Republic where he then worked. Vladimir Vysotsky's work from that period had not received official recognition and thus he had no contract for recording from Melodiya, the monopolist of the Soviet recording industry, so his work was unsanctioned. With this recording and the advent of portable tape-recorders in the Soviet Union, his music became available to the masses in the form of home-made reel-to-reel audio tape recordings. Together they produced the breakthrough record "For uncle"; one piece was based on an essay by Aleksey Vysotsky about two-time Hero of the Soviet Union, Nikolai Skomorokhov and was included in a later formal release as Vladimir Vysotsky's "A Song about a Fallen Pilot" (Песня о погибшем лётчике, 1975).

== Family ==
His son, Alexander Vysotsky (1945–1992), was a journalist, writer, and held a doctorate of philological sciences, as well as being international class in men's eight competitive rowing, winning a silver prize at the World Cup of 1970 in St. Ketrinse, Canada.

His daughter, Irena A. Vysotskaya (b. 1953), is a children's book writer and author.

His paternal uncle Leon Solomonovich (Leybish Shliomovich) Vysotsky (1886–1974), was a prominent Kiev chemical engineer and inventor, founding the Kiev factory «Himefir».

His half brother on the maternal side was the well-known music administrator (manager) and the poet-songwriter Paul L. Leonidov (1927–1984).

His nephew Vladimir Vysotsky (1938–1980) was a poet, author, singer, as well as a theater and film actor. Vladimir's wife was the French actress Marina Vlady (Marina Polyakova-Baydarova).

His maternal grandfather, Lev Grigorievich Levin (1870–1938) was physician and health-care consultant to the Kremlin, serving as physician to leaders of the party and government, including Lenin, Molotov and Maxim Gorky. He was shot 15 March 1938 on charges of involvement in the putative Trotsky conspiracy to eliminate prominent Soviet leaders.

== Death ==
Alexey Vysotsky died in 1977, and is buried on the Vagankovo Cemetery in Moscow, as is his nephew, Vladimir Vysotsky.

== Honours and awards ==
- Three Orders of the Red Banner
- Order of the Red Star
- Order of the Patriotic War 1st class
- Order of the Patriotic War 2nd class
- Medal "For the Defence of Odessa"
- Medal "For the Defence of Sevastopol"
- Medal "For the Victory over Germany in the Great Patriotic War 1941–1945"
