= Yakiv Hordiyenko =

Soviet partisan

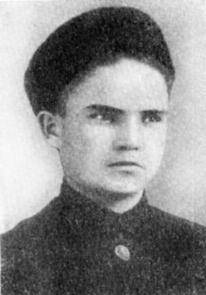
- Nickname: Kapitan (Sea captain)
- Born: April 26, 1925; Odessa, Odessa Governorate, Ukrainian SSR
- Died: 30 July 1942 (aged 17) Odessa, Transnistria Governorate, Romania
- Allegiance: Soviet Union
- Awards: Order of the Patriotic War 1st class Medal "For the Defence of Odessa"; Medal "For the Defence of Odessa"

Yakiv Yakovych Hordiyenko, also Yakov Yakovlevich Gordienko (alternatively Romanised as Gordi'yenko; Russian: Яков Яковлевич Гордиенко; April 26, 1925 – July 30, 1942) was a Soviet partisan from Ukraine. He was leading youth wing of Odessa resistance group led by Molodtsov-Badayev and operated in Odessa catacombs.

Yakiv Hordiyenko was born into the family of a former sailor Yakiv Hordiyenko of the Imperial Russian battleship Sinop (scrapped by the Soviets in 1922).

In 1941 he completed the ninth year of secondary school, then studied at the Navy specialized secondary school (Odessa). He was a member of the All-Union Leninist Young Communist League. In August 1941 he joined the detachment of the NKVD (People's Commissariat for Internal Affairs), captain Molodtsov-Badayev, which was formed to establish sabotage against the Nazis and Romanian invaders. First, he was liaison officer in a "flying squad". After, he became its leader.

Under the Nazis, Yakiv Hordiyenko proved a brave partisan, full of cunning and genius. Thanks to Yakiv and his group, the Moscow command received valuable information. He participated in military operations against the German and Romanian occupation forces.

Betrayed by Anton Fedorovych-Boiko, on 9 February 1942, Yakiv, his chief Molodtsov-Badayev and some other members of the partisan group were captured in the secure apartment. From 9 February 1942 to mid-May, Yakiv was imprisoned by the Siguranța (Romanian security service) and sentenced to death. In late July 1942, Yakiv and some of his fellow inmates were taken from the prison to be executed. During the trip to the artillery field, Yakiv began singing a revolutionary song. The guards shouted in vain to make him stop. Finally, one of them hit Yakiv in the head with a shovel and killed him.

Yakiv Hordiyenko is buried at the Alley of Glory in Shevchenko Park in Odessa.

== See also ==
- Siege of Odessa (1941)
