= Filipp Oktyabrsky =

Soviet naval commander

Filipp Oktyabrsky Филипп Октябрьский
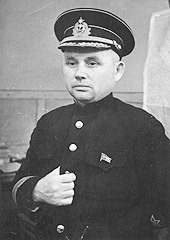
- Born: Filipp Sergeyevich Ivanov (Филипп Сергеевич Иванов); 23 October [O.S. 11 October] 1899; Lukshino, Zubtsovsky Uyezd, Tver Governorate, Russian Empire
- Died: 8 July 1969 (aged 69); Sevastopol, Ukrainian SSR, Soviet Union
- Military career
- Allegiance: Soviet Union
- Branch: Soviet Navy
- Service years: 1917–1960
- Rank: Admiral (1944)
- Commands: Amur Flotilla, Black Sea Fleet
- Conflicts: Russian Civil War; World War II
- Awards: Hero of the Soviet Union

Filipp Sergeyevich Ivanov (Russian: Филипп Сергеевич Иванов; 23 October [O.S. 11 October] 1899 – 8 July 1969), more popularly known as Filipp Sergeyevich Oktyabrsky (Russian: Филипп Сергеевич Октябрьский), was a Soviet naval commander. He began service in the Baltic Fleet in 1918. From 1925 to 1927 he studied at the Naval Academy in Leningrad. As vice-admiral he was given command of the Black Sea Fleet in March 1939 and headed its actions during the Sieges of Sevastopol (1941–1942) and Odessa (1941). After the war he became a Deputy Commander-in-Chief of the Navy, commander of all naval test centres and from 1957 to 1960 head of the Black Sea Higher Naval Institute "Admiral Pavel Nakhimov" (Russian: Черноморское высшее военно-морское училище имени П. С. Нахимова) in Sevastopol.

== Awards and honors ==
- Hero of the Soviet Union
- Three Orders of Lenin
- Three Order of the Red Banner
- Two Order of Ushakov 1st class
- Order of Nakhimov 1st class
- Order of Suvorov 2nd class
- Order of the Red Star
- Medal "For the Defence of Odessa"
- Medal "For the Defence of Sevastopol"
- Commander of the Legion of Merit (USA)

A Kresta II class cruiser was named in honour of the Admiral.
