= Siege of Sevastopol (1941–1942) =

Nazi German offensive on the Eastern Front of World War II

- Part of the Crimean campaign during the Eastern Front of World War II
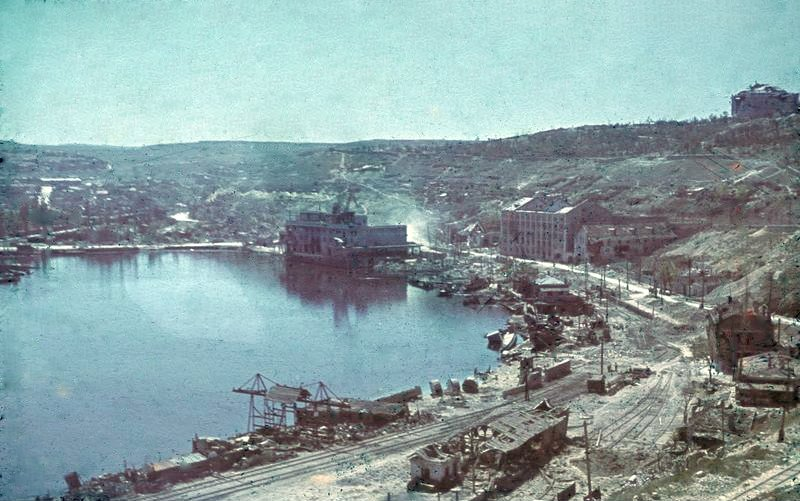
- Balaklava Bay (Балаклавська бухта) after the battle (July 1942)
Date	30 October 1941 – 4 July 1942 (8 months and 4 days)
Location	Sevastopol, Russian SFSR, Soviet Union 44°36′17″N 33°32′28″E
Result	Axis victory

Belligerents
Germany; Romania; Naval support: Italy	Soviet Union

Commanders and leaders
(Nazi Germany) Erich von Manstein (Nazi Germany) W.F. von Richthofen (Kingdom of Romania) Gheorghe Avramescu (Kingdom of Romania) Gheorghe Manoliu	(Soviet Union) Ivan Petrov (Soviet Union) Filipp Oktyabrskiy (Soviet Union) Gordey Levchenko (Soviet Union) Pyotr Novikov (POW)

Units involved
(Nazi Germany) 11th Army (Nazi Germany) 8th Air Corps (Kingdom of Romania) Mountain Corps	(Soviet Union) Coastal Army (Soviet Union) Black Sea Fleet

Strength
On 6 June 1942: 203,800 men 65 assault guns 1,300 guns and howitzers 720 mortars 803 aircraft	June 1942: 118,000 men 600 guns and howitzers 2,000 mortars 1 battleship 2 heavy cruisers 1 light cruiser 2 flotilla leaders 6 destroyers 9 minesweepers 1 guardship 24 submarines

Casualties and losses
30 October 1941 – 4 July 1942: 70,000 casualties (Note: Including 2,000 officers); 25,000 killed in action June–July 1942: 35,866 men 78 guns 31 aircraft (Nazi Germany) 27,412: 4,264 killed; 21,626 wounded; 1,522 missing; (Kingdom of Romania) 8,454: 1,597 killed; 6,571 wounded; 277 missing	30 October 1941 – 4 July 1942: 200,481 men 156,880 killed or captured 53,601 wounded or sick June–July 1942: 118,000 men 95,000 captured (one-third wounded) 5,000 wounded At least 18,000 killed

The siege of Sevastopol, also known as the defence of Sevastopol (Russian: Оборона Севастополя, romanized: Oborona Sevastopolya) or the Battle for Sevastopol (German: Schlacht um Sewastopol; Romanian: Bătălia de la Sevastopol; Russian: Битва за Севастополь, romanized: Bitva za Sevastopol'), was a military engagement that took place on the Eastern Front of the Second World War. The campaign was fought by the Axis powers of Germany and Romania against the Soviet Union for control of Sevastopol, a port in Crimea on the Black Sea. On 22 June 1941, the Axis invaded the Soviet Union during Operation Barbarossa, with Axis land forces reaching the Crimean peninsula in the autumn of 1941 and overrunning most of the area. The only objective not in Axis hands was Sevastopol. Several attempts were made to secure the city in October and November 1941. A major attack was planned for late November, but heavy rains delayed it until 17 December 1941. Under the command of Erich von Manstein, Axis forces were unable to capture Sevastopol during this first operation. Soviet forces launched an amphibious landing on the Crimean peninsula at Kerch in December 1941 to relieve the siege and force the Axis to divert forces to defend their gains. The operation saved Sevastopol for the time being, but the bridgehead in eastern Crimea was eliminated in May 1942.

After the failure of their first assault on Sevastopol, the Axis opted to conduct siege warfare until the middle of 1942, at which point they attacked the encircled Soviet forces by land, sea, and air. On 2 June 1942, the Axis began this operation, codenamed Störfang (Sturgeon Catch). The Soviet Red Army and Black Sea Fleet held out for weeks under intense Axis bombardment. The German Air Force (Luftwaffe) played a vital part in the siege, its 8th Air Corps bombing the besieged Soviet forces with impunity, flying 23,751 sorties and dropping 20,528 tons of bombs in June alone. The intensity of the German airstrikes was far beyond previous German bombing offensives against cities such as Warsaw, Rotterdam or London. At the end of the siege, there were only 11 undamaged buildings left in Sevastopol. The Luftwaffe sank or deterred most Soviet attempts to evacuate their troops by sea. The German 11th Army suppressed and destroyed the defenders by firing 46,750 tons of artillery ammunition on them during Störfang.

During the fighting on Sevastopol, German forces were alleged to have illegally deployed toxic gas several times against underground Red Army positions in the local cave networks. This was a measure they had also used against Red Army holdouts on the Kerch Peninsula.

Finally, on 4 July 1942, the remaining Soviet forces surrendered and the Germans seized the port. The Soviet Separate Coastal Army was annihilated, with 118,000 men killed, wounded or captured in the final assault and 200,481 casualties in the siege as a whole for both it and the Black Sea Fleet.

Total Axis losses during the 250-day siege numbered approximately 70,000 including 2,000 officers. Of that number, 25,000 German troops were killed in action. Axis losses in the final Störfang operation amounted to 35,866 men, of whom 27,412 were German and 8,454 Romanian. With the Soviet forces neutralized, the Axis refocused their attention on the major summer campaign of that year, Case Blue and the advance to the Caucasus oilfields. However, the enormous cost of the Sevastopol campaign had reduced German resources for Case Blue "at a critical time".

== Background ==
The Soviet naval base at Sevastopol was one of the strongest fortifications in the world. Its site, on a deeply eroded, bare limestone promontory at the southwestern tip of the Crimea, made an approach by land forces exceedingly difficult. The high-level cliffs overlooking Severnaya Bay protected the anchorage, making an amphibious landing just as dangerous. The Soviet Navy had built upon these natural defenses by modernizing the port and installing heavy coastal batteries consisting of 180mm and 305mm re-purposed battleship guns which were capable of firing inland as well as out to sea. The artillery emplacements were protected by reinforced concrete fortifications and 9.8-inch thick armored turrets.

The port was a valuable target. Its importance as a potential naval and air base would enable the Axis to conduct far-ranging sea and air operations against Soviet targets into and over the Caucasus ports and mountains. The Red Air Force had been using the Crimea as a base to attack targets in Romania since the Axis invasion in June 1941, proving its usefulness as an air base. Likewise, the Wehrmacht had launched a bombing raid on the Sevastopol naval base at the start of the invasion.

Since the beginning of Barbarossa, the offensive against the USSR had not really addressed Crimea as an objective. German planners assumed the area would be captured in mopping-up operations once the bulk of the Red Army was destroyed west of the Dnieper river. But in June, attacks by Soviet aircraft from Crimea against Romania's oil refineries destroyed 12,000 tons of oil. Hitler described the area as an "unsinkable aircraft carrier" and ordered the conquest of Ukraine and Crimea as vital targets in Directive 33, dated 23 July 1941.

The Command of the Army (OKH) issued orders that the Crimea was to be captured as soon as possible to prevent attacks on Romanian oil supplies, vital to the German military. Hitler, impatient with obstruction to his commands to advance in the south, repeated on 12 August his desire that the Crimea be taken immediately. Over a month later, during the capture of Kiev, Generaloberst (General Colonel) Erich von Manstein was given command of the German 11th Army on 17 September. After only a week in command, he launched an assault upon Crimea. After severe fighting, Manstein's forces defeated several Soviet counteroffensives and destroyed two Soviet armies. By 16 November, the Wehrmacht had cleared the region, capturing its capital Simferopol, on 1 November. The fall of Kerch on 16 November left only Sevastopol in Soviet hands.

By the end of October 1941, Major-General Ivan Yefimovich Petrov's Independent Coastal Army, numbering 32,000 men, had arrived at Sevastopol by sea from Odessa further west, it having been evacuated after heavy fighting. Petrov set about fortifying the inland approaches to Sevastopol. He aimed to halt the Axis drive on the port by creating three defence lines inland, the outermost arc being 16 km (10 mi) from the port itself. Soviet forces, including the Soviet 51st Army and elements of the Black Sea Fleet, were defeated in the Crimea in October and were evacuated in December, leaving Petrov's force as Sevastopol's main defence force. Having cleared the rest of the Crimea between 26 September – 16 November, the Romanian 3rd Army and German 11th Army prepared for an attack on the port. The German 11th Army was the weakest on the entire front, initially containing only seven infantry divisions. The Romanians contributed a large force, but were only lightly equipped and generally lacked heavy artillery. The weather turned against the Axis in mid-October and torrential downpours delayed the buildup. This gave Vice Admiral Filipp Oktyabrsky, commander of the Black Sea Fleet, time to bring in men and materiel from Novorossiysk. By 17 December, the weather had cleared sufficiently for the Axis to begin a major operation.

== Forces involved ==
=== Axis ===
The German 11th Army, commanded by Manstein, besieged Sevastopol. At the time of the final assault in June 1942, 11th Army consisted of nine German infantry divisions in two Corps, and one Romanian Corps, being the Romanian 7th Mountain Corps. Significant support was given by the Luftwaffe. The Oberkommando der Luftwaffe dispatched Luftflotte 4's (Air Fleet 4) 8th Air Corps for support. It consisted of nine Geschwader (Wings) containing 600 aircraft, all coming under the command of Generaloberst Wolfram Freiherr von Richthofen. Among this contingent was a powerful concentration of medium bomber, dive bomber, and torpedo bomber Geschwader.

Naval support came from the Italian 101st Squadron under Francesco Mimbelli. It consisted of four motor torpedo boats, five explosive motorboats, six CB class midget submarines, and a number of 35-ton coastal submarines and MAS boats. This force was the only Axis naval force deployed during the siege. It had been requested by the Germans—the only time during the war that the Germans spontaneously requested Italian assistance. Although Bulgaria was not technically at war with the Soviet Union, its naval staff worked closely with the Wehrmacht, and despite not being committed to combat, they provided bases for the Axis naval command (Admiral Schwarzes Meer, Admiral of the Black Sea) to operate in the waters of the Black Sea.

The Axis order of battle:

- German 11th Army
  - 306th Army Artillery Command
    - Elements 672nd Artillery Battalion—one Schwerer Gustav Dora
    - 833rd Heavy Mortar Battalion—two Karl-Gerät
    - 688th Railroad Artillery Battery—three 28 cm lg.Br.K
    - 458th Heavy Artillery Battery—one 42 cm Haubitze(t)
    - 459th Heavy Artillery Battery—one 42 cm Gamma Mörser
    - 741st, 742nd, and 743rd Artillery Battalions—four 28 cm Hb. each
    - 744th Artillery Battalion—two 28 cm Küst.Hb.
    - 624th Heavy Artillery Battalion—six 30.5 cm Mrs. and nine 21 cm Mrs.
    - 641st Heavy Artillery Battalion—four 30.5 cm Mrs. and one 35.5 cm Haubitze M1
    - 815th Heavy Artillery Battalion—six 30.5 cm Mrs.
  - German LIV Corps
    - 22nd Infantry Division
    - 24th Infantry Division
    - 50th Infantry Division
    - 132nd Infantry Division
  - German XXX Corps
    - 28th Light Infantry Division
    - 72nd Infantry Division
    - 170th Infantry Division
    - 22nd Panzer Division
  - Romanian Mountain Corps
    - 1st Mountain Division
    - 4th Mountain Division
    - 18th Infantry Division
- Luftwaffe
  - Luftflotte 4
    - 8th Air Corps
      - Lehrgeschwader 1
      - Kampfgeschwader 26
      - Kampfgeschwader 51
      - Kampfgeschwader 55
      - Kampfgeschwader 76
      - Kampfgeschwader 100
      - Sturzkampfgeschwader 77
      - Jagdgeschwader 77
      - Jagdgeschwader 3
      - Jagdgeschwader 52

- Italian Regia Marina
  - Quarta Flottiglia MAS

=== Soviet ===
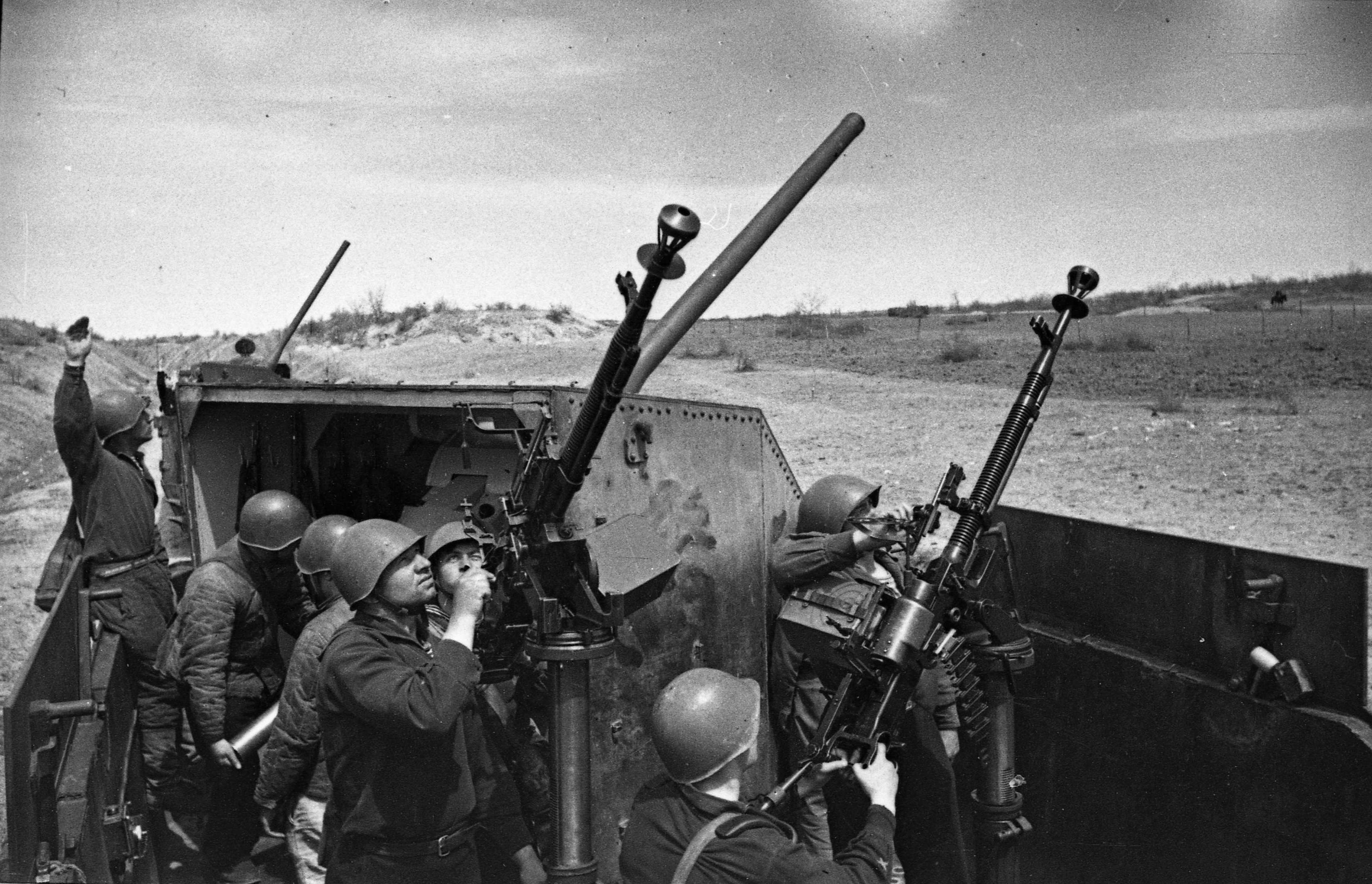
Anti-aircraft gunners of the Zheleznyakov coast defense armored train by a DShK machine gun, preparing to defend against German air attack, May 1942

The defence of Sevastopol was provided mainly by the Black Sea Fleet and the Separate Coastal Army under Petrov (which had been shipped in from the siege of Odessa). The Black Sea Fleet sent 49,372 personnel to fight as infantry. Most were not trained for ground combat, and the act was an ad hoc emergency measure. The naval brigades formed had four to six battalions of 4,000 men, allowing them to absorb significant losses. These forces were well armed, having a variety of artillery and mortar battalions. Almost 20 percent of the Coastal Army were naval personnel. In the Separate Coastal Army, the strongest divisions were the 95th, 109th, 172nd, and 388th Rifle Divisions. They each had around 7,000 soldiers, the rest of the Red Army units having around 5,000 personnel. Some 5,000 reinforcements made it into Sevastopol in May 1942. However, Petrov's army lacked tanks and anti-aircraft guns. The garrison also lacked food supplies and mortar ammunition, which would severely sap Soviet strength. Poor communications between headquarters and the front lines were also an issue. Petrov found it difficult to respond to Axis attacks quickly.

Red Army:

- Coastal Batteries
  - 12 battalions
  - 3 batteries
- Defence Sector I
  - 109th Rifle Division
  - 388th Rifle Division
- Defence Sector II
  - 386th Rifle Division
  - 7th Naval Infantry Brigade
- Defence Sector III
  - 25th Rifle Division
  - 345th Rifle Division
  - 8th Naval Infantry Brigade
  - 79th Naval Infantry Brigade
- Defence Sector IV
  - 95th Rifle Division
  - 172nd Rifle Division

Red Air Force and Soviet Naval Aviation:

- 3rd Special Aviation Group
- 6th Guards Naval Fighter Regiment
- 9th Naval Fighter Regiment
- 247th Fighter Regiment
- 18th Ground Attack Regiment
- 23rd Aviation Regiment
- 32nd Guards Fighter Regiment
- 116th Maritime Reconnaissance Regiment

Soviet Black Sea Fleet:

- Battleship, Parizhskaya Kommuna
- Two heavy cruisers
- One Light Cruiser
- Two Flotilla Leaders
- Six Destroyers
- Nine Minesweepers
- One Guardship
- 24 Submarines

== First Axis offensive ==
The German 11th Army's first task was to break through into the Crimea. The cities of Perekop and Ishun guarded the narrow corridor of land which linked the Crimea to the bulk of Ukraine. Erick-Oskar Hansen's LIV Corps, with its 45th and 73rd Infantry Divisions, broke through at Perekop at the cost of 2,641 casualties in six days of fighting. The Soviet forces launched a counteroffensive against the 11th Army's flank at Melitopol. Manstein withdrew his other corps in order to deal with it. The resulting battle ended with the destruction of two attacking Soviet Armies. By the time that this threat had been dealt with, the Stavka had rushed in reinforcements and established another defence line at Ishun. Ordered to concentrate on the Crimea once more, Manstein launched his LIV Corps, this time with the support of the German 22nd Infantry Division, into the assault. The Soviet forces enjoyed local air superiority and armored reserves. They also outnumbered the attacking Wehrmacht. In spite of this, the defending Soviet 51st Army was pushed back. The Wehrmacht suffered 5,376 casualties in 12 days of combat, and the Red Army many more. By the end of October, the 51st Army was crushed and in full retreat into the Crimea. The situation in the air also changed. Arriving Jagdgeschwader (Fighter Wings) won air superiority for the Axis.

On 22 and 23 October, Jagdgeschwader 3 (JG 3), JG 52, and JG 77 crippled the Soviet air strength in the Crimea. Over the two days they destroyed 33 Soviet aircraft for one loss. In the six days from 18 to 24 October 140 Soviet aircraft were lost, 124 of them to Luftwaffe fighters. Heinkel He 111s of KG 26 and KG 51 and Junkers Ju 87 Stukas of StG 77 were free to attack Soviet ground positions, contributing to the collapse of the Soviet Crimean Front on 27 October.

=== Sevastopol offensive ===
==== Initial battles ====
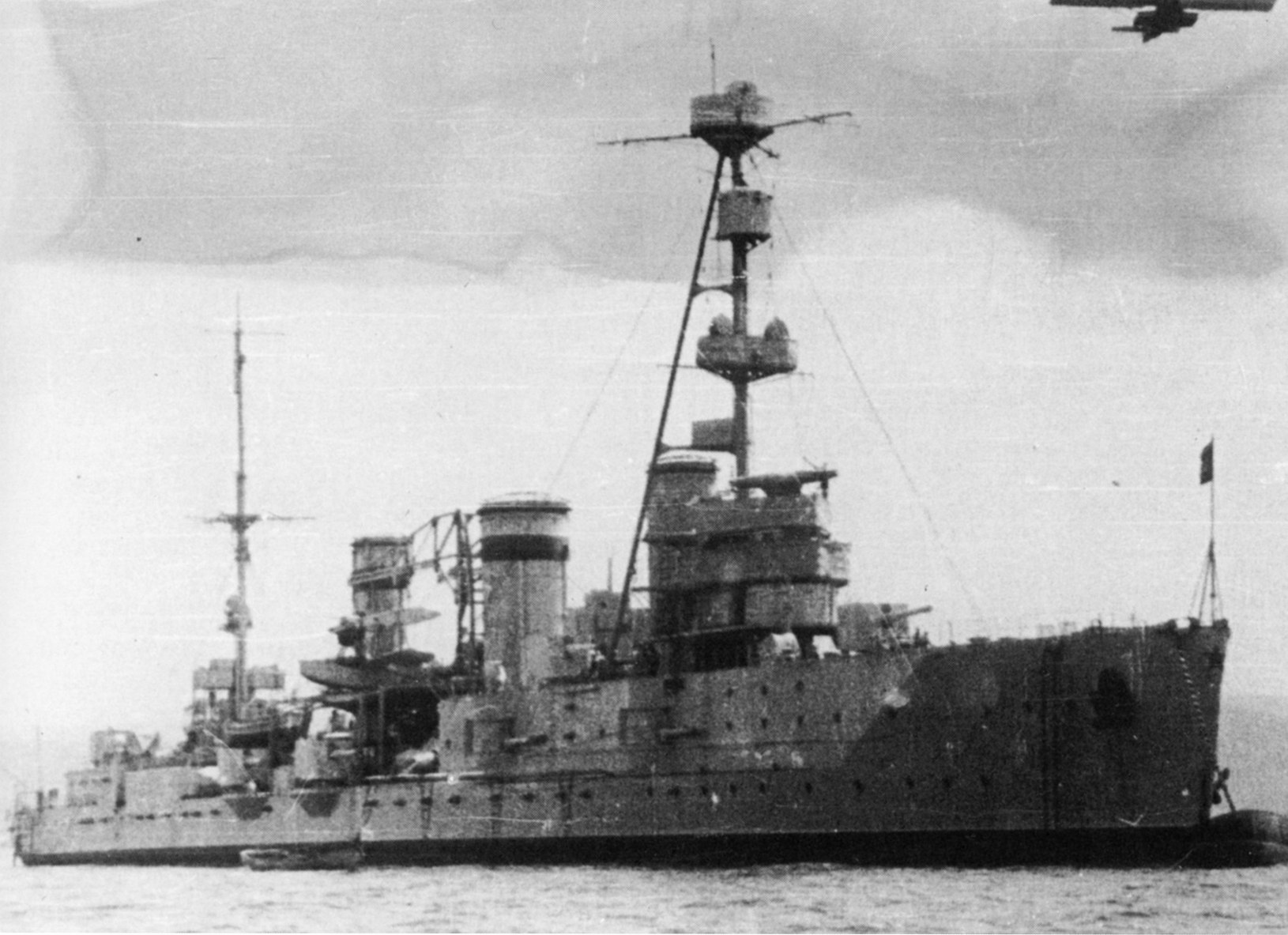
Chervona Ukraina. She was sunk by Ju 87s of StG 77 on 12 November.

With the front collapsing and the Axis closing in on Sevastopol, Vice-Admiral Oktyabrsky assumed command of the port on 4 November 1941. The city had a civilian population of 111,000 in 1941, and most were sent to work on the three defence lines around the port. Only the 7th and 8th Naval Infantry Brigades were available for combat in the port. More naval infantry were formed from ships in the harbor. The 8th Naval Infantry Brigade was sent to guard the northeastern approaches near the Mamachai-Belbek line. The 7th (5,200 men) was deployed in the center, near Mekenzyya. With only 20,000 soldiers, Oktyabrsky relied heavily on his 12 coastal battalions to slow down the Axis. The 62nd Fighter Brigade contributed 61 fighters, which were able to achieve temporary air superiority.

On 30 October, the Soviet defences detected the spearhead of the German 132nd Infantry Division and shelled it at 12:30 on 1 November using Battery 30's 305mm coastal guns. The Germans designated the fort as Fort Maxim Gorky I. Wehrmacht lacked sufficient air and mobile units to force a decision. Instead, Manstein ordered Hansen's LIV Corps to head east down the Sevastopol–Simferopol rail line towards Yalta, while the 72nd Infantry Division was to head to Balaklava, effectively encircling Sevastopol. Once there, it would attack Sevastopol from the east. The 132nd made reasonable progress, but was stopped on 2 November by the 8th Naval Brigade. The Wehrmacht suffered 428 casualties. Manstein ordered a halt for a week, whilst bringing up reserves. Oktyabrsky used his fleet to bring in a further 23,000 men from the Caucasus. On 9 November, Petrov's Army was brought in, bringing 19,894 soldiers, ten T-26 tanks, 152 artillery pieces, and 200 mortars. The Red Army now had 52,000 troops in the area of the city. The Luftwaffe was considered weak (the bulk of it was engaged in the Battle of Moscow), so the Soviet Navy kept the heavy cruiser Krasny Kavkaz, light cruisers Krasny Krym and Chervona Ukraina, and seven destroyers to protect the port.

The Luftwaffe did what it could to disrupt the Soviet defences. On 31 October, the destroyer Bodry shelled German positions along the coastline. StG 77 Ju 87s attacked and wounded 50 of its crew by strafing its deck and superstructure with machinegun fire. On 2 November Junkers Ju 88s of KG 51 scored several hits on the cruiser Voroshilov and put it out of action for months. On 7 November He 111s from KG 26 sank the liner Armeniya evacuating soldiers and civilians from Sevastopol, with only eight of the 5,000 passengers surviving. On 12 November, StG 77 sank the cruiser Chervona Ukraina and KG 26 damaged the destroyers Sovershenny and Besposhchadny. But with the Luftwaffe units being dispatched to other sectors and theatres, the Soviet forces again achieved air superiority with 59 aircraft (39 serviceable).

Manstein wanted to launch an attack as soon as possible, but his logistical lines were poor. Wanting to avoid strong Soviet forces protecting the north of the port, including the 95th Rifle Division, Manstein chose to press the center and southern Soviet defences. He ordered the German 50th Infantry Division to probe the center of the Soviet line east of the Chernaya river. The 132nd Infantry Division supported the probe and was able to push to within 4 kilometres of Severnaya Bay. The 72nd Rifle Division, with the support of the coastal batteries, moved in to stop the attack. The 72nd Infantry Division continued towards Balaklava, and the 22nd Infantry Division joined the assault. Assisted by shelling from two light cruisers and the battleship Parizhskaya Kommuna, the Red Army halted this attack, and Manstein called off the offensive on 21 November, having lost 2,000 men.

==== December offensive ====
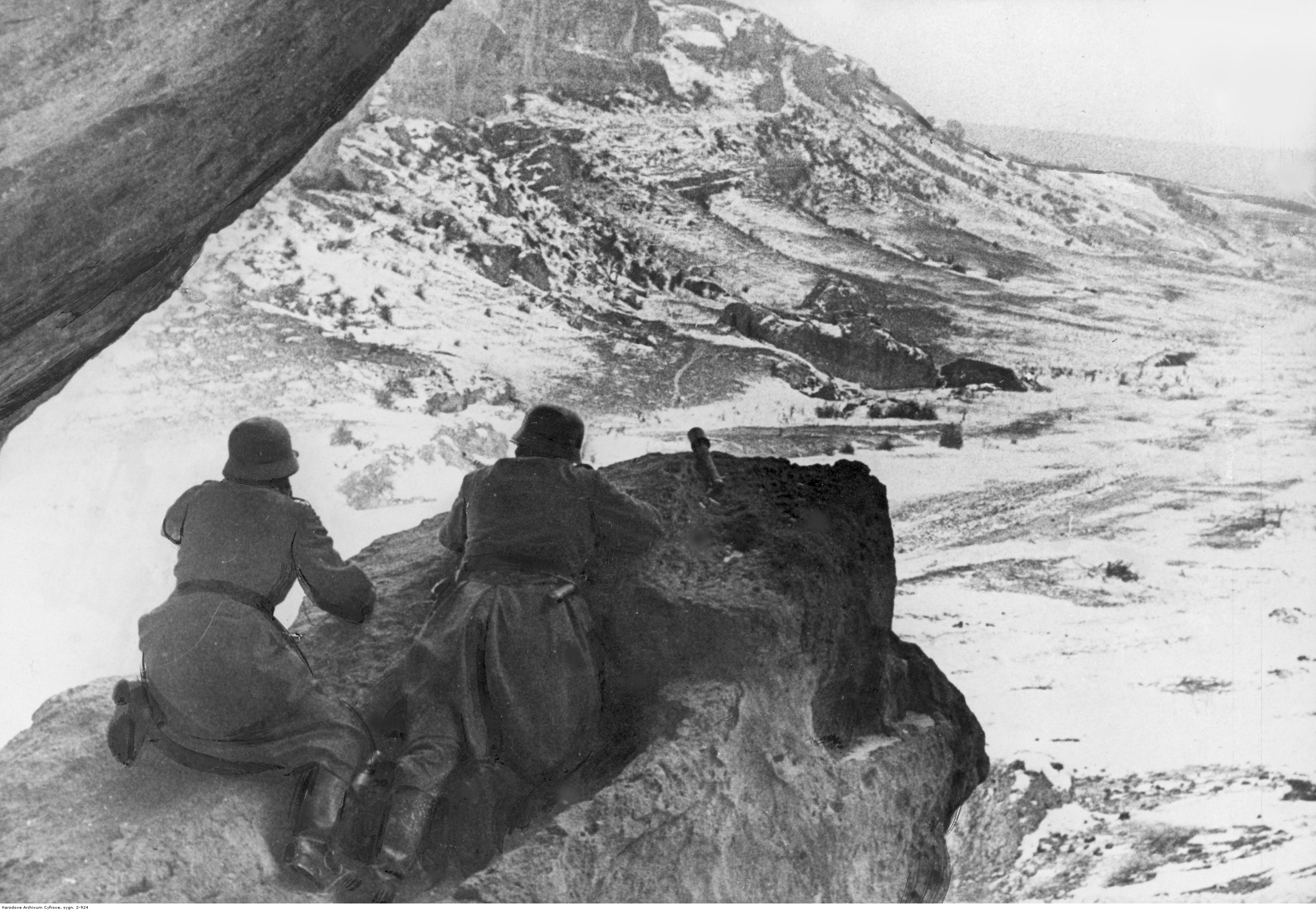
Two German soldiers near Sevastopol, December 1941.

Manstein recognised that he could not take the port quickly, and was going to have to organise a proper set-piece offensive. With German offensive operations suspended in December, Manstein found himself the only commander on the Eastern Front with an offensive mission. He was not ready to carry out his attack until 17 December. In the meantime, Oktyabrsky used the interval to sail the 11,000 soldiers of the 388th Rifle Division into Sevastopol between 7–13 December. Soviet engineers began laying extensive minefields and barbed-wire belts. By the time of the Axis attack, Petrov's force held a strong defensive position. The naval commander demanded that Petrov hold the coast along the northern flank of Sevastopol on the Belbek River in order to retain Coastal Battery 10, an artillery complex near Mamaschai. On the other hand, the German LIV Corps had only 15,551 men in its four infantry divisions (22nd, 24th, 50th, and 132nd). Over 7,000 soldiers in the German 11th Army were on the sick list at that time. It was also short of artillery ammunition and heavy artillery. In order to commit as many forces to the battle as possible, Manstein left the weak XLII Corps, containing just the 46th Infantry Division and two Romanian brigades, to protect the entire front from Yalta to Kerch.

The attack began at 06:10 on 17 December. The 22nd Infantry Division attacked the 8th Naval Brigade on the Belbek River, pushing west towards the coast, while the 50th and 132nd Infantry Divisions conducted fixing attacks on the Soviet center. The 22nd succeeded in rolling up the flank of the Naval Brigade after five days of fighting. However, Oktyabrsky ordered its retirement south towards Sevastopol, abandoning Mamaschai and forming a new front north of Belbek city and the Belbek river. In the south, XXX Corps tried and failed to break through with the 72nd and 170th Infantry Divisions. Only minor gains were made against the 172nd Rifle Division, even with help from the Romanian 1st Mountain Brigade. The 79th Naval Brigade and 345th Rifle Division arrived by sea as reinforcements, using the long winter nights and their naval superiority. Meanwhile, the battleship Parizhskaya Kommuna shelled German forces whenever they threatened a breakthrough. The offensive came to an abrupt end when the Red Army staged an amphibious landing at Kerch.

=== Kerch landing ===
Between 26 and 30 December 1941, the USSR launched an amphibious assault on the Kerch peninsula to relieve the encircled Soviet forces at Sevastopol. It succeeded in gaining and sustaining a bridgehead for five months. However, a German−led counteroffensive named Operation Bustard Hunt destroyed the bridgehead and the three Soviet Armies supporting the landing in May 1942. This allowed Manstein to concentrate all of his resources against Sevastopol for the first time. The front over Sevastopol grew quiet and a stalemate ensued. The Luftwaffe kept up the pressure on Soviet sea communications and although supplies still made it through, Vice Admiral Oktyabrsky, commanding the Black Sea Fleet, was forced to reduce the number of coastal bombardment missions.

== Second Axis offensive ==
=== Unternehmen Störfang ===
==== Soviet defence ====
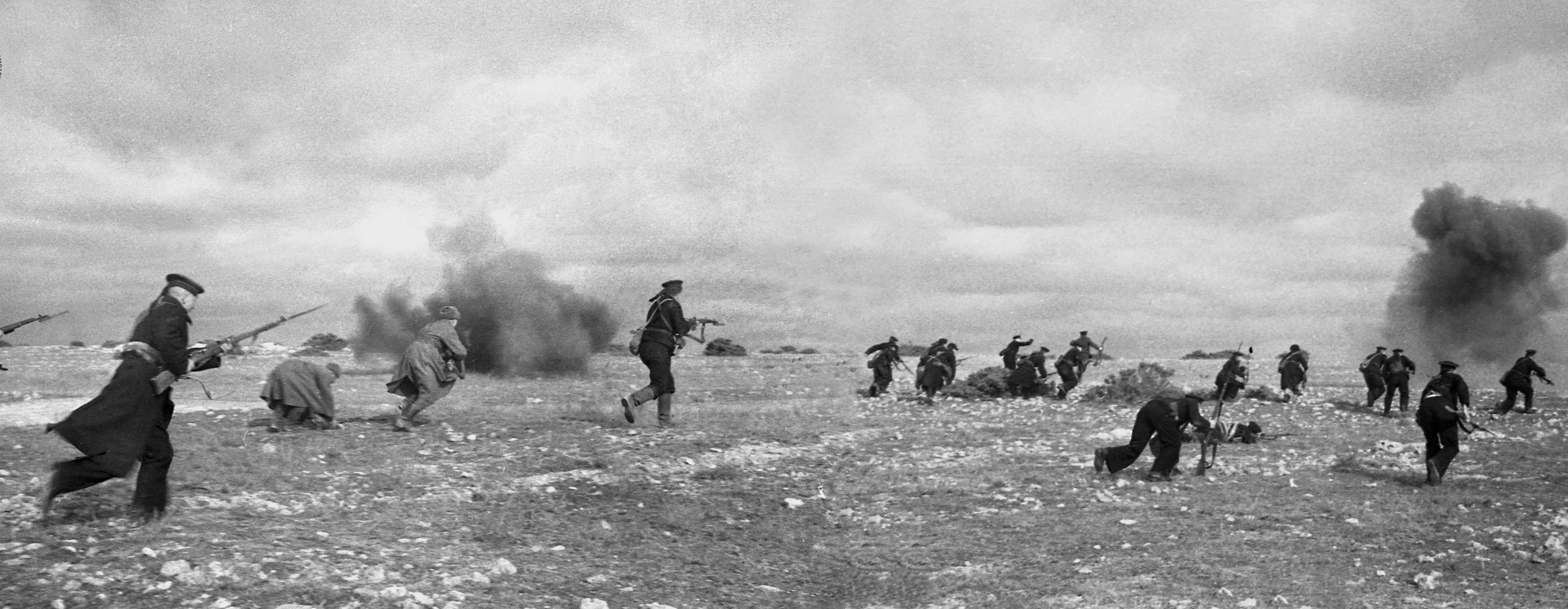
Naval infantrymen of the 79th Naval Rifle Brigade attacking near Sevastopol, January–February 1942

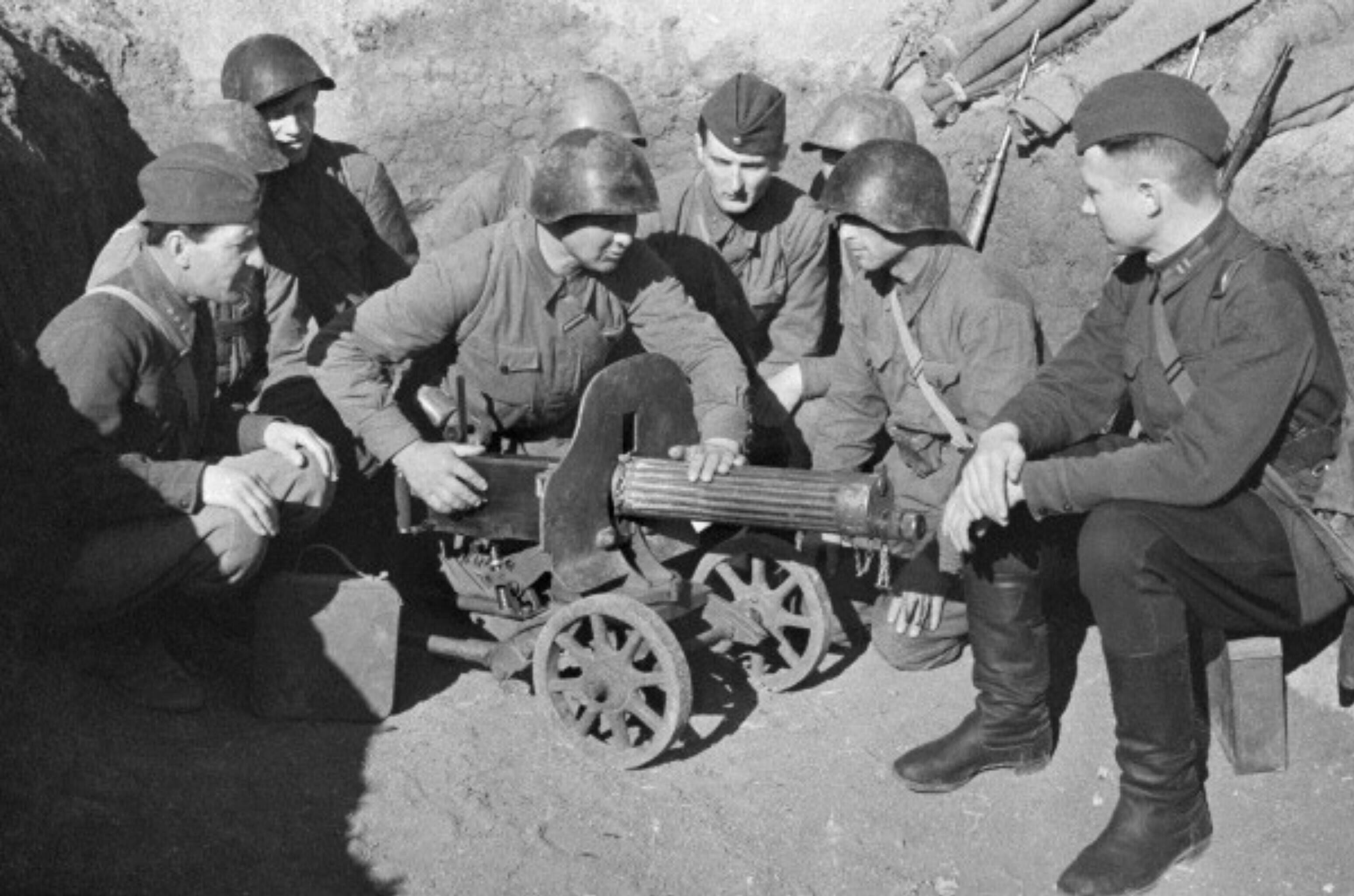
A Soviet commissar with a machine gun team in Sevastopol in May 1942

Sevastopol was still a formidable obstacle. Its airfields provided a base for the Red Air Force to attack the Axis-held Soviet coastline and Romania proper. It was also home to the Black Sea Fleet. Its main fortifications were pointed seaward, while the land defences encircled the city at a distance of 15–20 km, with an inner defense belt at a range of 5 km. Enhancing the manmade defences was the forested, rugged terrain. To the north of Severnaya Bay there were 11 batteries and strongpoints. They were given morale-boosting names such as Stalin, Maxim Gorky I, Molotov, and Lenin. They were defended by the First Coastal Army. Elsewhere, the Red Army had constructed hundreds of timber bunkers with machinegun nests and 45 mm anti-tank artillery. Along the outer belt, concrete bunkers were less common, 19 being stretched across its 37 km. Soviet engineers laid thousands of mines, including PMD-6 wooden anti-personnel mines, TMD-40 wooden anti-tank mines, and barbed-wire obstacle belts.

Petrov, commanding the Independent Coastal Army, had a powerful artillery pool. Petrov had on strength some 455 artillery pieces and howitzers. Among those were 34 152 mm and 40 122 mm howitzers and 918 mortars. Ammunition was adequate for a battle of two weeks for these calibers, but 82 mm mortar ammunition was in short supply. The battles of the Crimean campaign had taken their toll, and scarcely any tank and anti-aircraft artillery support were available. A further force, under Major-General Pyotr Morgunov, was added. The Coastal Artillery Force was semi-independent for much of the siege, and had an initial strength of 12 batteries and 45 guns, although more were added during 1942. By the time of the German June offensive, the Soviet forces had available eight 305 mm, one 188 mm, 10 152 mm and 17 130 mm, three 120 mm, eight 100 mm, and four 45 mm guns.

==== Axis forces ====
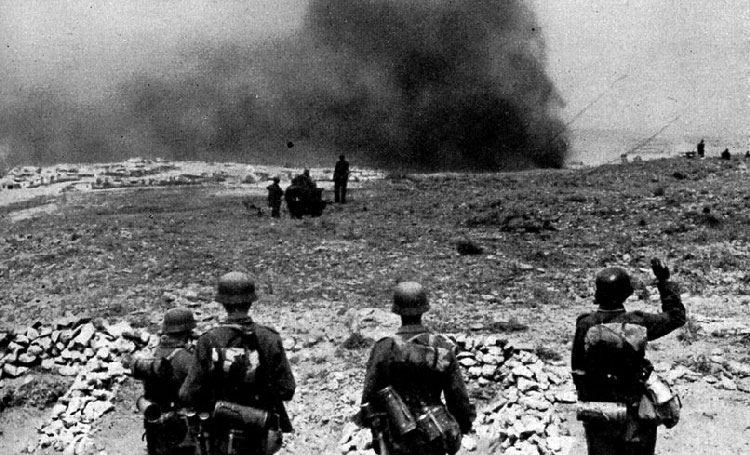
German 11th Army soldiers approach burning Sevastopol in June 1942.

By this time, the Axis was facing a serious manpower and artillery shortage. The German 11th Army's divisions had anywhere between 35 and 75 percent of their initial strength. The German 22nd Infantry Division was the strongest division, and was only short 1,750 personnel, while the weakest was the 132nd Infantry Division, which was short 2,300 men. The 170th Infantry Division had to collapse one of its regiments to bring the others up to strength. The German infantry force was a fragile force at Sevastopol and Manstein could not afford to squander it. German doctrine stressed bypassing strongpoints, but since this was not possible, German infantry were forced to reduce one fort after another. Some 65 Sturmgeschütz III assault guns were available to support them.

The assault was based around battalion-strength infantry assault groups supported by a platoon of engineers and a few assault guns. Two pioneer battalions were attached to each division to spearhead the attack and break through fixed and fortified defences. The eight battalions of LIV Corps each contained around 386 men on average, and were equipped with 10–12 flame throwers, 28–30 mine detectors, 3,000 kg of high explosives, 2,200 hand grenades, and 500 smoke grenades. The 300th Panzer Battalion, a remote-controlled tank unit using the Goliath tracked mine, was made available for destroying fortifications. The total number of artillery pieces came to 785 German and 112 Romanian medium and heavy guns. Most of these were under the command of LIV Corps, the main assault force. To increase this arsenal, a number of super-heavy artillery pieces were made available. Three 600 mm Karl-Gerät self-propelled mortars (Thor, Odin, and one other) and one 800 mm gun (Schwerer Gustav), delivering 1.4 and 7 ton shells, respectively, and capable of destroying any fortification. However, the Karl-Gerät guns only had a range of between 4–6,000 meters, which made them vulnerable to counter-battery fire. Moreover, only 201 rounds of 600 mm and 48 round of 800 mm ammunition were available. Most of it was used up before the infantry assault.

More useful to the German infantry were the two 280 mm railway guns. Two 420 mm, two 355 mm howitzers were also available, along with four 305 mm mortars. Both of the 420 mm guns were of First World War vintage, short in range and with limited ammunition. Some nine 283 mm mortars were also available, but they were pre-1914 weapons and six had burst during firing. Artillery acquired from Czechoslovakia after the Munich Agreement, the Skoda 305 mm Model 1911 howitzer was also available. At the divisional level, 268 105 mm and 80 150 mm weapons were in service, including 126 Nebelwerfer infantry barrage rocket launchers. Overall, the German 11th Army's artillery was a collection of modern, obsolete, and foreign-built weapons. For the offensive, 183,750 rounds of 105 mm and 47,300 rounds of 150 mm ammunition were stockpiled, enough for 12 days of firing.

To reinforce the 11th Army, the Romanians were committed to the assault. The Romanian 18th Infantry Division was at full strength, and plenty of Romanian infantry were available. However, the 18th Division was inexperienced and made up of reservists. The Romanian 1st Mountain Division was considered an elite force, and its addition was to prove useful. They had 112 guns available, but virtually no engineers. The weakness of their artillery and supporting arms made the Romanian X Corps reliant on the German forces for anything other than set-piece infantry attacks.

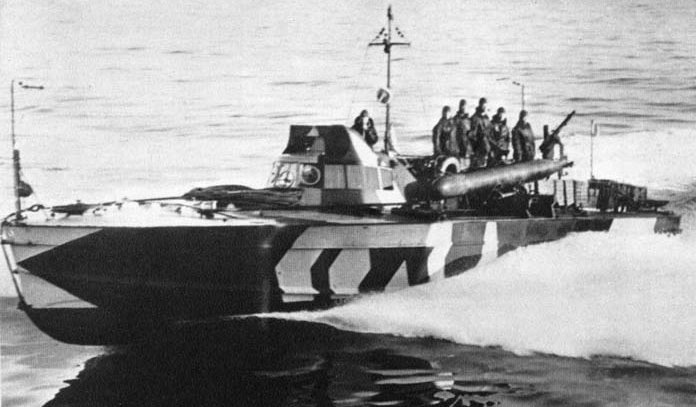
Italian Motoscafo Armato Silurante (MAS) boat

The Luftwaffe had to compensate for the Axis artillery limitations. A powerful air armada was brought together. Under the 8th Air Corps, von Richthofen assembled six Kampfgruppen (Bomber Groups) originating from six different Kampfgeschwader (Bomber Wings): KG 51 Edelweiß, KG 76, KG 100, and III.Gruppe/LG 1 specialist training wing. Dive-bomber support from StG 77 was also given to Richthofen. He could call upon three gruppen of Ju 87s. Jagdgeschwader (Fighter Wings) JG 3 Udet and JG 77 Herz As were available for air superiority operations. II.Gruppe/KG 26 Löwe was also available for anti-shipping operations, in addition to the air-land effort carried out by the 8th Air Corps.

The Luftwaffe could not support the land assault and maintain pressure on Soviet sea communications alone. With only KG 26 engaged in anti-shipping operations against Soviet sea communications, the OKW looked to the Kriegsmarine to supply Schnellboot (S-Boat) motor torpedo boats to help eliminate Soviet shipping supplying and evacuating the port. The time it took to dismantle and move the 92-ton boats by rail to Romanian ports was going to be too long. In a rare appeal for help, the German forces turned to their Italian allies, aware of their expertise with motor torpedo boat operations. The Regia Marina sent the 101st Naval Squadron, which brought nine torpedo boats and nine coastal submarines under the command of the highly competent Capitano di Fregata Francesco Mimbelli. The Italian boats were only 24 tons and the submarines were 35 tons, which made them easier to transport by truck and barge. The squadron was based at Feodosiya and Yalta, which made it the only Axis naval force to participate in the siege. It mainly engaged in offensive operations against Soviet supply efforts.

=== Battle ===
==== Air offensive ====
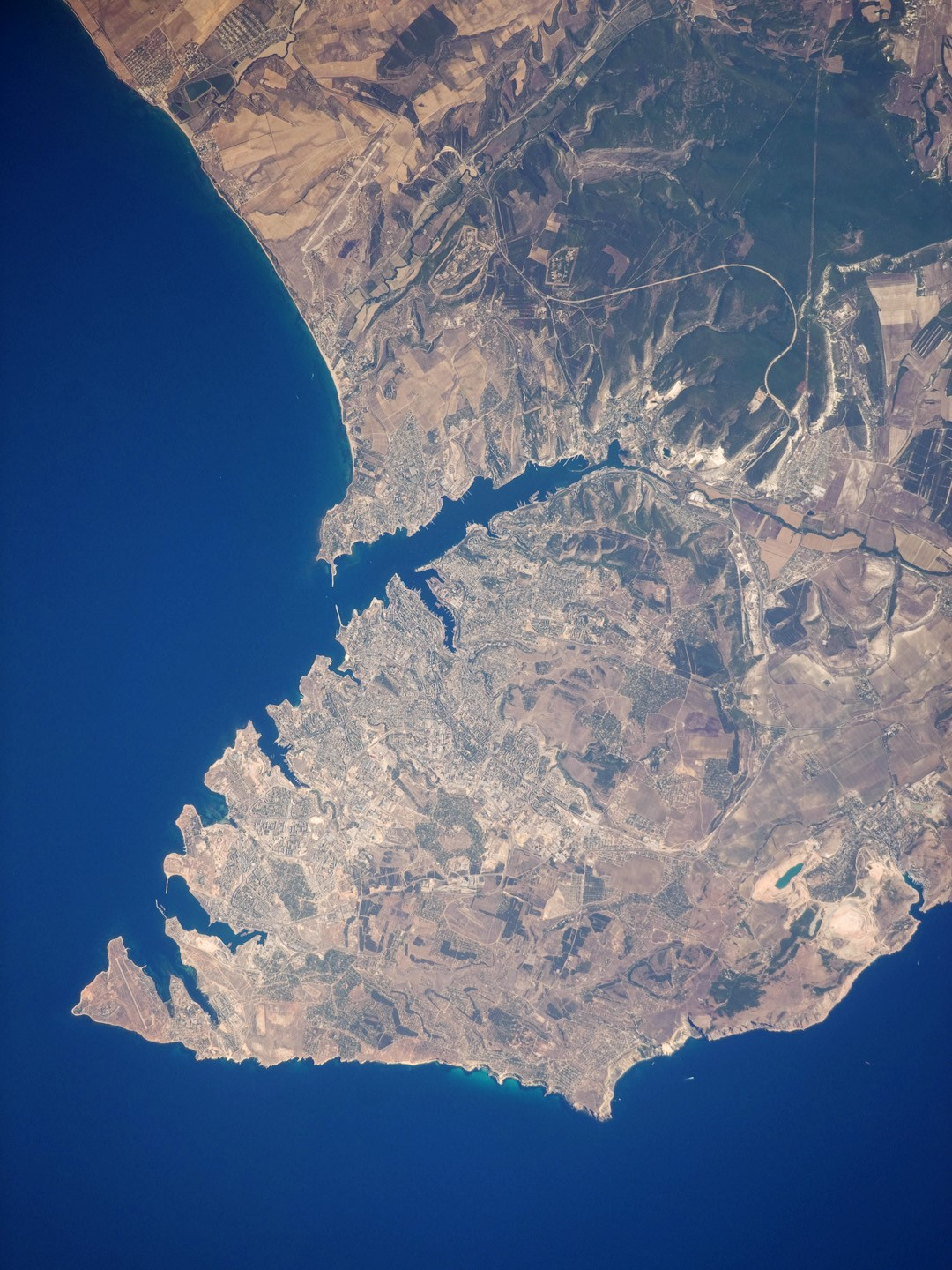
Satellite image of the Sevastopol area. Note the dense forest terrain situated on high ground and valleys to the east of the port.

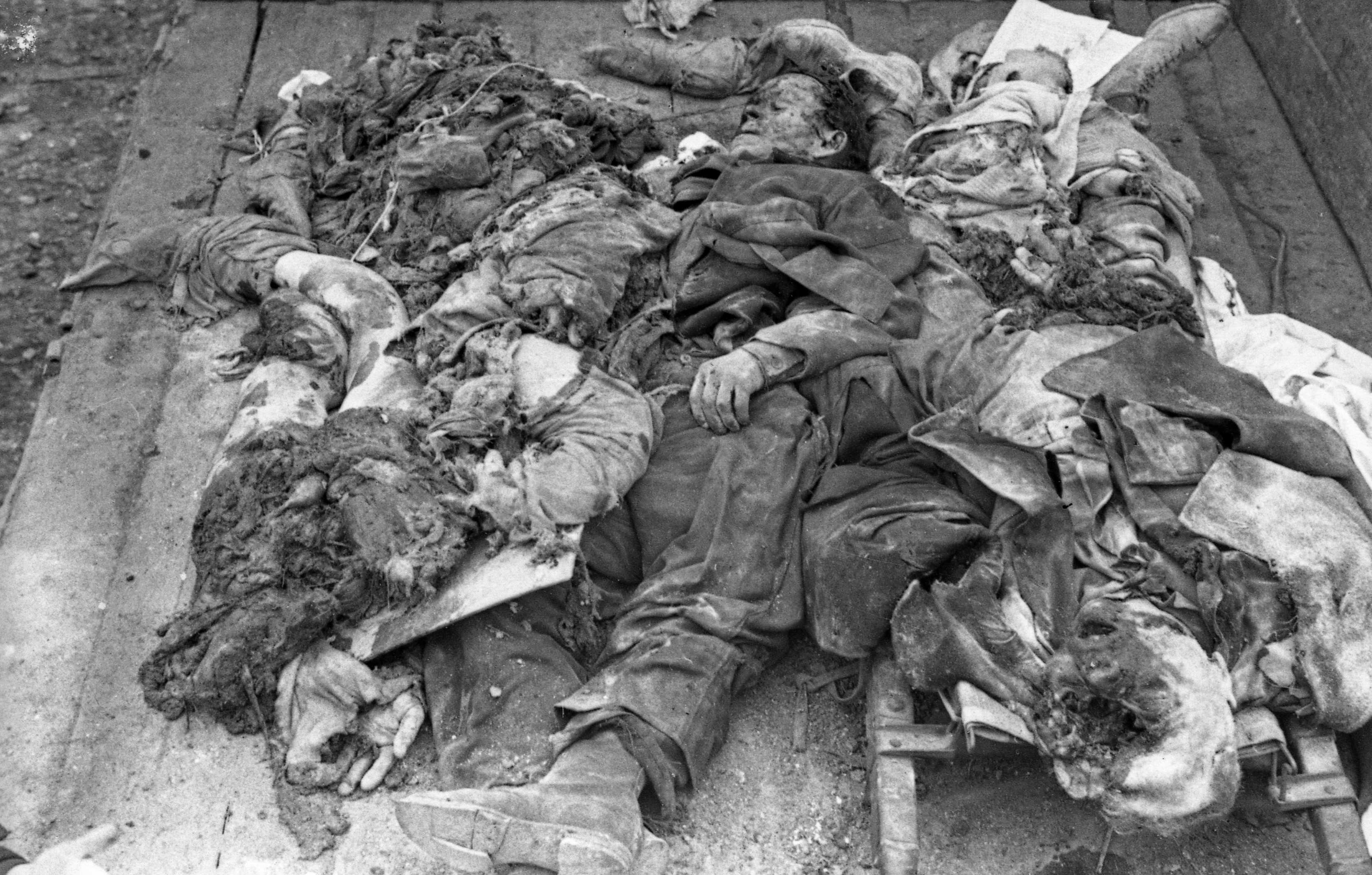
Bodies of victims of the bombing of Sevastopol, 1942

Manstein demanded an all-out assault by the Luftwaffe before the main ground action began. Situated only 70 km from Sevastopol, the German formations had barely enough time to reach altitude before reaching their targets. The 8th Air Corps began its bombing campaign along the north and southeast of the city. At the same time, German medium bombers conducted rolling attacks on the city, which included all units except LG 1, which engaged in suppressing anti-aircraft installations. Oil, electricity, water pumps, harbor facilities, and submarine bases were attacked by StG 77 Ju 87s. Von Richthofen watched the bombing from an observation post close to the front. The targets were badly damaged, and fires broke out all over the port city. The Luftwaffe flew 723 missions and dropped 525 tons of high explosive on the first day. Despite heavy anti-aircraft fire, just one Ju 87 was lost.

While the bulk of the Luftwaffe was busy with the land battle, III./KG 26 sought to break Soviet sea communications. They sank the tanker Mikhail Gromov, but the flotilla leader Tashkent, the destroyer Bezuprechnyy, and transport Abkhaziya escaped to bring 2,785 soldiers into the fortress. Air support continued with 643 sorties on 3 June 585 on 4 June, and 555 on 5 June, with some German crews flying daily averages of 18 missions. By the start of the ground attack on 7 June, the Luftwaffe had flown 3,069 sorties and 2,264 tons of high explosive and 23,800 incendiary bombs were dropped. Many of the bombs dropped were 1,000 kg SC 1000, 1,400 kg SC 1400, and 2,500 kg SC 2500 bombs. The heavy-caliber weapons were aimed at Soviet concrete bunkers. Ivan Laskin, commanding the 172nd Rifle Division in the northern sector recalled, "Bombers in groups of twenty to thirty attacked us without caring for their targets. They came in, wave after wave, and literally ploughed up the earth throughout our defence area. German aircraft were in the air above our positions all day long. The sky was clouded by smoke from explosions of thousands of bombs and shells. An enormous dark grey cloud of smoke and dust rose higher and higher and finally eclipsed the sun". The German air campaign against Sevastopol in June 1942 surpassed by far the German bombings of Warsaw, Rotterdam or London. From 3 to 6 June, the Luftwaffe carried out 2,355 operations and dropped 1,800 tons of high explosives.

On 7 June, Manstein ordered the ground assault. The Luftwaffe carried out 1,368 sorties and dropped 1,300 tons of bombs on Soviet positions, but the Soviet infantry clung on.

==== Ground fighting: 7–10 June ====
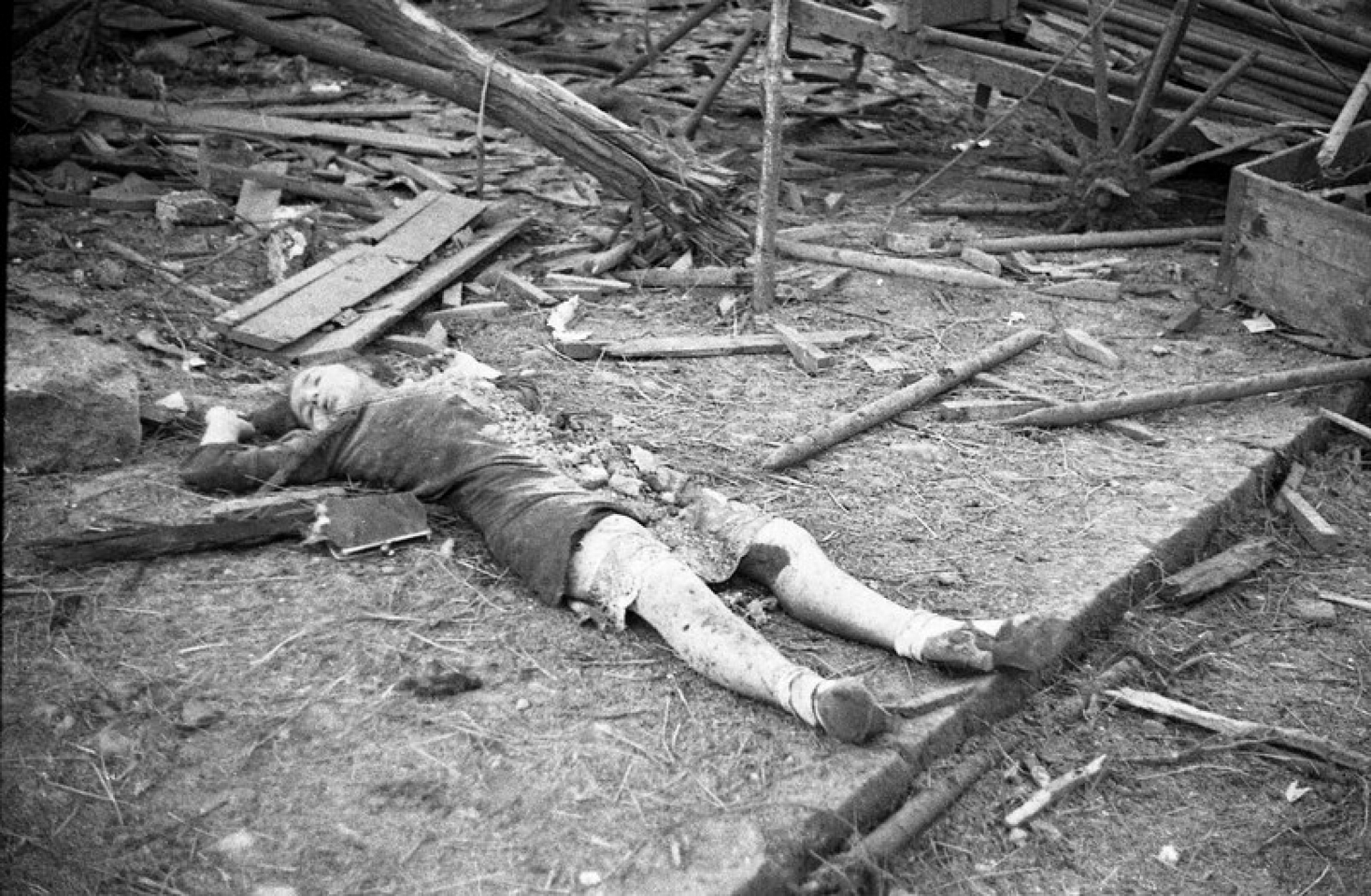
A woman killed by the German bombing of Sevastopol

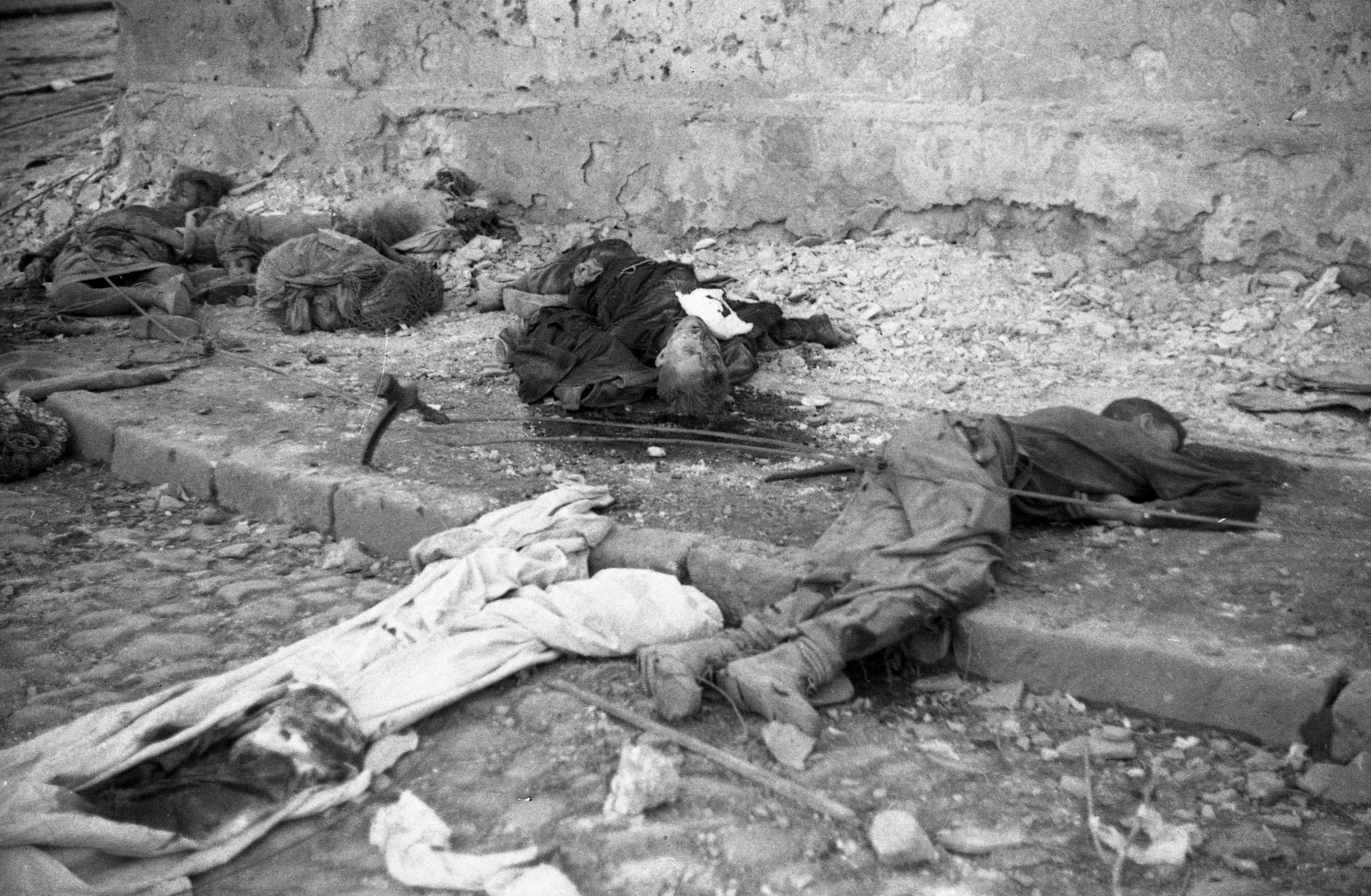
Civilian casualties of the German bombing of Sevastopol, May 1942

LIV Corps was to strike the main blow. Situated on the northeast edge of the city, they struck along the lines of least resistance, across the Belbek river while the German XXX and Romanian Mountain Corps conducted holding attacks in the south and center, respectively. Both the latter corps did not start major operations until 8 June.

The artillery bombardment targeted bunkers with 105 mm fire, which usually received 10–25 rounds. German Flak 36 37 mm guns also did an effective job of eliminating machinegun nests. The German forces were also quick to bring up 88 mm artillery guns to fire directly into bunker apertures. Between 2 and 6 June, the German 11th Army expended nine percent of its munitions (42,595 rounds, amounting to 2,449 tons of munitions) on pre-advance shelling. The railway guns also fired a few rounds at the main fortifications and rail lines, but most missed by some distance. The closest shell landed 80 meters away from its target. Soviet ammunition dumps were also targeted by these weapons, with no effect. The main fortifications, forts Stalin, Molotov, and Maxim Gorky (which lay in the path of LIV Corps), remained active. It was not until the afternoon of 6 June when a single 60 cm calibre mortar shell from the Karl-Gerät self-propelled mortar no. III, nicknamed Thor, knocked out Maxim Gorky's second turret, damaging the weapon. This was the only success of the German super-heavy guns, which did not have an impact commensurate with their expense. The Luftwaffe had a greater impact, using its Ju 87s to knock out the communications systems of the fort.

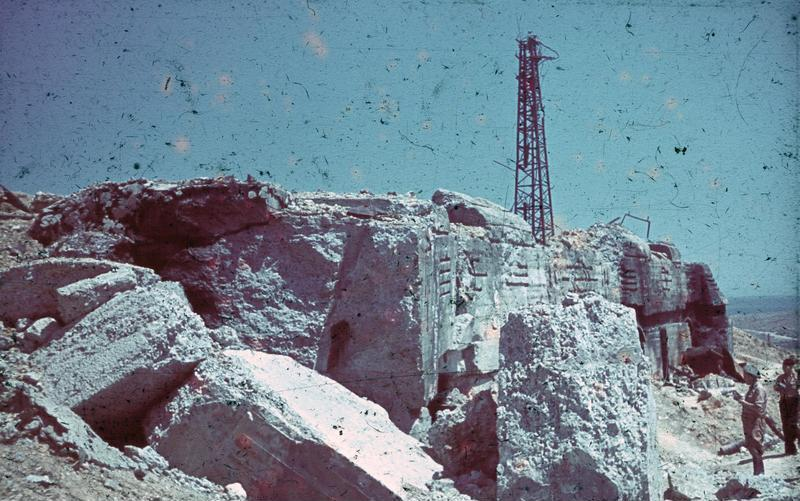
Destroyed Soviet bunker after the battle.

On the morning of 7 June 1942, the German infantry began advancing cautiously. XXX Corps attacked the southern positions held by the 7th Naval Brigade and 388th Rifle Division. The German infantry advanced behind air and artillery support. The infantry seemed afraid of their fire support and did not advance close enough behind it. The bombardment also failed to have enough of an effect. The Soviet forces held their fire until the German forces were well within range before opening fire, and little progress was made. Von Richthofen was angered by the fear of the infantry and called the day "a real disappointment". The next few days were not much better, despite the Luftwaffe flying 1,200 sorties. The pace of operations exhausted the machines and men. Often crews did not get out of their aircraft and made three or four sorties without rest.

LIV Corps began its assault in the north on the seam of the Soviet defence sectors III and IV. The 'Schwerer Gustav' weapon continued to fire against ammunition dumps, which produced no effect. Nevertheless, the 132nd Infantry Division was able to work its way up to the river. The 600 mm guns concentrated on the coastal batteries and Maxim Gorky fortress. Meanwhile, the German 22nd Infantry Division attacked further to the east. Some 200 Soviet reinforcements of the 79th Naval Infantry Brigade, protecting this sector, were lost in the bombardment, but the main defences held out. The brigade held most of its forces in reserve, while committing only a single company to cover the hilly terrain on the Belbek river front. German assault groups breached the first and reserve lines by 08:15. The German forces had to negotiate heavily mined areas, slowing them down and allowing the Soviet forces to make a partial recovery. Supporting operations by the 50th and 24th German Infantry Divisions failed, which cost the Wehrmacht 12 StuG assault guns. The remote-control demolition units were not effective as the terrain was unsuitable.

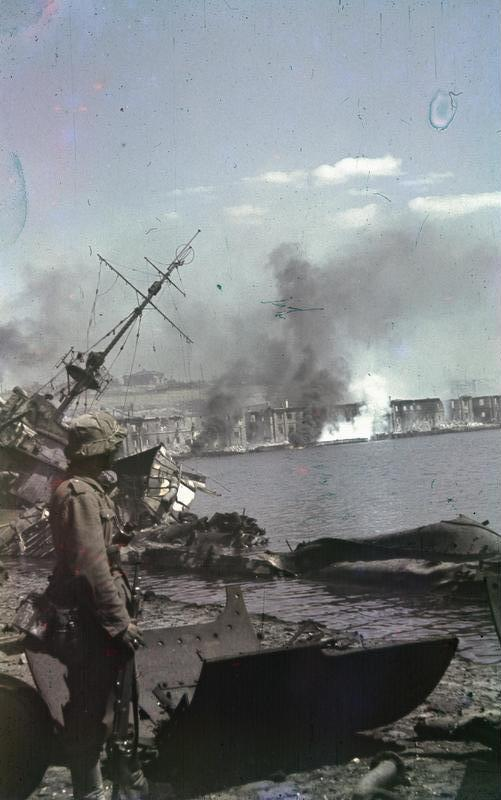
German soldier in Sevastopol harbor next to a sunken Soviet destroyer

By 17:15 the town of Belbek was secured. The 22nd Infantry Division made considerable progress in breaking through the defenses of the 25th Rifle Division. The 50th Infantry Division supported the 22nd's left flank. Now facing the Germans was the Haccius Ridge, on which the fortress Maxim Gorky was located. It was flanked by several smaller forts to the east.

Now the 132nd Infantry Divisions was ordered to conduct a converging pincer movement on the Maxim Gorky fortress in conjunction with the 22nd and 50th Infantry Divisions, to trap its defenders against the coast. The 132nd pushed into the 95th Rifle Division's positions north of the fort, while the other two divisions attacked in a flanking move. While the Germans did make progress, nearing the main railway station just southeast of Maxim Gorky, they were stopped from achieving a full-scale breakthrough by the 172nd Rifle Division. The 22nd and 50th Infantry Divisions had been heavily shelled by mortar fire from the 25th Rifle Division facing them east of the Haccius Ridge, which caused heavy casualties. By 18:00 hours, the German attack was spent.

LIV Corps' losses on 7 June amounted to 2,357 casualties in four divisions, including 340 killed. It had also expended 3,939 tons of ammunition. The 132nd Division had exhausted all of its basic munitions load by midday. On the other side, the formidable Soviet defence lines east and southeast of Belbek had been overrun, and the Germans succeeded in advancing 2 km through dense Soviet defences. The Soviet casualties had also been severe. It is estimated that three battalions were effectively destroyed.

Manstein recognised the seriousness of the failure on 8 June. He was worried that the 132nd Infantry Division, locked in combat with the 79th Naval Brigade and 95th and 172nd Rifle Divisions north of the city on the Belbek river front, was "approaching the end of its strength". Once again, the army turned to the Luftwaffe for support. Richthofen responded by ordering attacks against Soviet supply lines. The same day, German bombers, including KG 100, began attacks on Soviet shipping. They sank the destroyer Sovershenny and the survey vessel Gyuys, with the 4,727 ton transport Abkhaziya and destroyer Svobodnyy following them on 10 June.

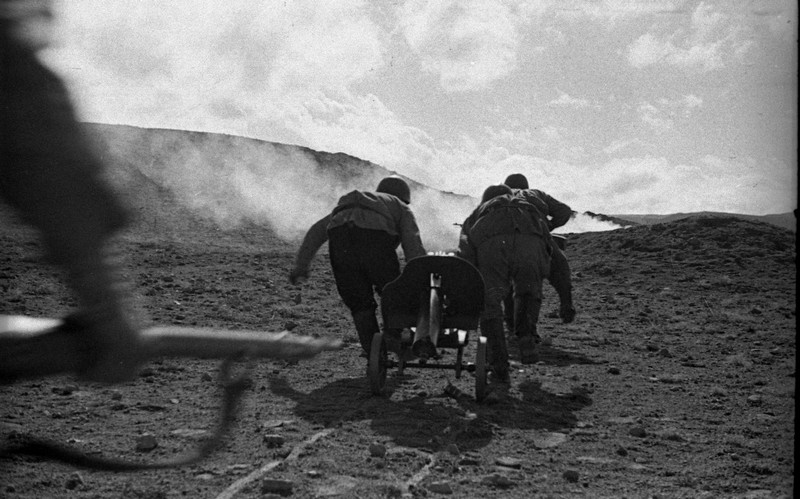
A Maxim machine gun crew from the 25th Rifle Division shifts positions, spring 1942

The period between 8–12 June descended into a battle of attrition. Several Soviet counterattacks were repulsed with heavy losses. The German LIV Corps extended the salient on the seam of the III and IV sector to 3 km, determined to break through before Petrov could reinforce his lines. The 132nd Infantry Division cleared the Haccius Ridge while the 22nd Infantry Division overran most of the Soviet 79th Naval Infantry Brigade. The Soviet unit tried counterattacking on 10 June, but was repulsed. The Soviet formation was effectively destroyed, with the support of the Luftwaffe, which used anti-personnel bombs against Soviet infantry caught in the open. Only one battalion (the Soviet 1st Batt./241st Rifle Regiment) was in a position to block the Germans from encircling the Maxim Gorky fort. Still, on 8 June LIV Corps had lost 1,700 men. In return, the lodgement in Soviet lines was extended to 3 km deep and 5 km wide.

In the south, XXX Corps made no progress in four days of attacks. They suffered 496 casualties at the hands of the 109th Rifle Division. The 28th Light and 72nd Infantry Divisions had succeeded in puncturing the Soviet lines opposite the 109th and 388th Rifle Divisions. The outer defences were broken in some parts, but the most were still in Soviet hands on 12 June. The main belt on the Sapun Ridge (Sapun-gora) was unbroken. Soviet casualties amounted to 2,500, including 700 captured. By 13 June, XXX Corps had lost 2,659 men, including 394 killed.

==== Air-land operations: 11–15 June ====
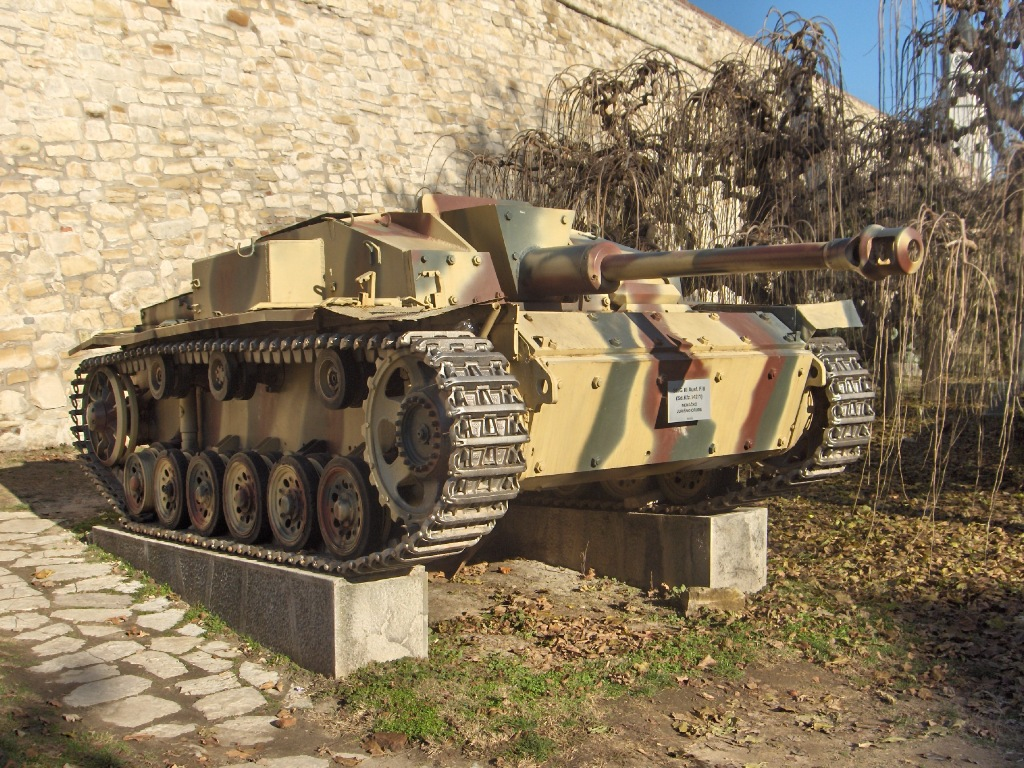
A StuG III. These vehicles helped knock out Fort Stalin.

As the Germans made slow progress toward the main train station, Petrov withdrew the battered 172nd Rifle Division and replaced it with 345th Rifle Division. The 95th Rifle Division halted the 132nd Division's progress in the north. Although a relatively quiet day, 10 June saw the elimination of the Soviet 79th Naval Brigade and LIV Corps lost 2,772 men. Counterattacks by the Soviet 345th Division aimed at the hinge between the German 132nd and 50th Divisions were repulsed by the Luftwaffe. On 11–12 June, LIV Corps lost another 1,957 men. The Red Army had committed all of its reserves and were stretched dangerously thin. One more push might collapse the northern sector. But at this time, the tired German infantry were running short on reinforcements and ammunition.

In contrast, the Black Sea Fleet was bringing in reinforcements through Luftwaffe attacks. On 12 June the cruiser Molotov and destroyer Bditelny brought in 2,314 soldiers, 190 tons of ammunition and 28 artillery pieces. The Luftwaffe turned its attention to these convoys. On 13 June it sank the transports Gruzyia and TSch-27, patrol boat SKA-092, motor boat SP-40, five barges, and a floating crane. On 15 June another 3,400 soldiers, 442 tons of ammunition, 30 tons of fuel and 12 tons of provisions reinforced the Soviet positions.

The Luftwaffe had flown 1,044 sorties on 11 June, dropping 954 tons of bombs. The consumption rate of ammunition was putting von Richthofen's logistical network under strain and he could no longer afford to fly massed bombing raids. On 11 June, he surmised there was less than two days' worth of munitions left, requiring a change of tactics. Instead of carpet bombing, fewer targets would be attacked simultaneously, and aircraft would strike at designated targets in long and narrow lines. This was designed to maintain accurate pressure without wasting ordnance. Even this failed to alleviate shortages in the long term. By 17 June, scarcity of aviation fuel meant the Luftwaffe dropped only 800 instead of the planned 1,000 tons of bombs. Adding to the Luftwaffe's troubles in the sector, von Richthofen was transferred to prepare the Corps' Headquarters near Kursk to support the upcoming Operation Blue, the German summer offensive in southern Russia. He retained formal command, at least until given control of Luftflotte 4, but Wolfgang von Wild took over air operations over Sevastopol.

The primary objective for the 22nd Infantry Division on 13 June was Fort Stalin, blocking the advance to Severnaya Bay. It was a tough position. The fortifications allowed the Soviet forces to concentrate artillery against breakthroughs and machine gun posts protected the fort from southern and eastern attacks, but it was vulnerable from a northern assault. In addition, only 200 men from the 345th Rifle Division were stationed there. The Germans launched their assault on the position at 03:00 on 13 June with just 813 men. The 3rd Battalion was assigned to suppress Soviet machine gun and mortar positions located on the southeast as a diversion. The 1st Battalion, supported by five StuG assault guns, two 37mm guns and an Engineer Company, were to serve as the main effort. Some 200 and 110 men were committed respectively in each unit.

German bombardment began on 12 June. Artillery fire from 'Dora' had failed to neutralise the fort. Nevertheless, a combined arms attack from eleven 420 mm mortars and dive-bombing by Ju 87s of StG 77 knocked out the fort's main armament (three of the four 76.2 mm guns). At 19:00 the 22nd divisional artillery began shelling the fort and its smaller supporting fortress, Volga, located to Stalin's rear, with 210, 280 and 305 mm weapons. At 03:00 the German infantry attacked. The fog of war intervened. The Soviet mortar teams were not suppressed, and a fierce battle developed which lasted until 05:30. The Germans, with the support of five assault guns and a few 37 mm weapons, silenced the fort, bunker by bunker. In the heavy fighting a large number of company commanders were killed.

As the Germans seized this vital fort, the neighbouring Volga fort realised it had fallen and shelled the position. A company-sized counterattack by the Soviet forces was wiped out by German small arms fire. The Germans declared the position secured at 07:00, though some bunkers held out until 15:00. German casualties amounted to 32 dead, 126 wounded and two missing – half of the force committed. Soviet casualties amounted to 20 captured, the remainder were killed. With only 91 men left near the fort, Petrov did not order a recovery attempt – a grave mistake.

The fall of Fort Stalin meant the Soviet defenses in the north were on the verge of collapse. Hansen ordered LIV Corps to divert its attention to Fort Maxim Gorky and the elimination of the Soviet 95th Rifle Division. The 95th Rifle Division had been halting the 132nd Infantry Division's progress since the start of the offensive. The 132nd was reinforced by one regiment from the idle 46th Infantry Division near Kerch. The German 24th, 50th and Romanian 4th Mountain Divisions were to maintain pressure in the central sector while they pushed towards the Mekensia and Gatani Valley and the Chernaya River opening at Severnaya Bay. For three days, 14–16 June, the battle continued as the Axis advanced towards Sevastopol in the face of Soviet resistance. On 15 June the 132nd was within 900 metres of the Maxim Gorky's outer bastion (Bastion I). The front opposite the 25th Soviet Rifles was still strong, but the northern flank was giving way. The 79th Naval Brigade had only 35 percent of its fighting strength remaining. Blocking the way to Maxim Gorky were just 1,000 men of the 95th Rifle Division and 7th Naval Brigade.

In the south the Soviet 109th and 388th Rifle Divisions were forced back along the coast by the German 72nd and 170th Infantry Divisions while the Romanian Corps' 18th Mountain Division dislodged the Soviet 386th Rifle Division threatening XXX Corps' right flank. The battles continued to grind on until 20 June. In six days, XXX Corps had lost 2,646 men. In exchange the outer defences of the 388th Rifle Division had been broken and the formation effectively destroyed. Still, the German advance on Balaklava had been halted. The Germans had not yet reached its outer defences and the Sapun Ridge to the east of the town was still under Soviet control. By 15 June, some 1,000 Soviet soldiers and 1,500 mortar bombs had been captured, indicating the Soviet forces had plenty of ammunition after two weeks of battle.

Despite shortages of aviation fuel and ordnance, the Luftwaffe had played a significant part in the success of the German operations. From 13 June until 17 June, it flew 3,899 sorties and dropped 3,086 tons of bombs. This average of 780 sorties per day was only a slight drop from the opening 11 days. Massed sorties were made on the city of Sevastopol itself. Bombing targeted hangars, port facilities, flak and artillery batteries, barracks, and supply depots with high explosive bombs. Most of the city was engulfed in flames. The smoke rose to 1,500 meters and stretched as far as Feodosiya, 150 kilometers away.

==== Ground fighting: 16–28 June ====
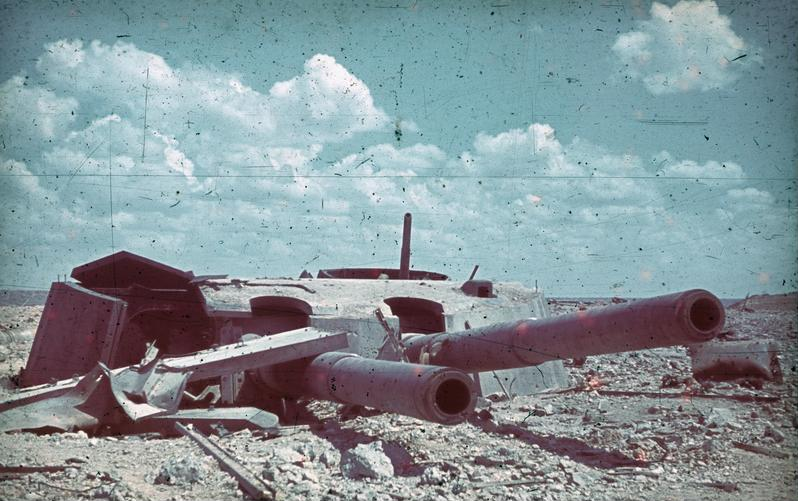
Destroyed Soviet "Maxim Gorky" naval battery

As Hansen poised his corps for the breakthrough against the 95th Rifle Division, 27 Ju 87s of II./StG 77 attacked Maxim Gorky's main battery. The Germans believed the strike had knocked it out as it stopped firing its artillery. The artillery bombardment began on 16 June. In the morning the attack by the reinforced 132nd Division collapsed the line. The Soviet garrison held out in tunnels, capitulating on 20 June.

The 22nd and 24th Infantry Divisions advanced from the northeast. They employed their Goliath remote control demolition vehicles with success against the timber bunkers. One exploded prematurely and two were knocked out by a minefield. Two Panzer III control vehicles were knocked out by Soviet anti-tank fire. By 19:30, Forts Maxim Gorky, Molotov, Schishkova, Volga and Siberia were overrun. The 24th Infantry Division in particular made extensive use of its Nebelwerfer rockets. The 95th and 172nd Rifle Divisions had been lost, as well as the majority of the fortified defences. Only the 25th Rifle remained in the line. Petrov rushed up the 138th Naval Brigade with an extra 2,600 men, which was landed on 12–13 June. It prevented German forces reaching Severnaya Bay that day.

The Luftwaffe was also engaged in applying pressure to Soviet naval forces. On 18 June the destroyer Kharkov was severely damaged. Attacks on 19 June by KG 51 destroyed the anti-aircraft platform in Severnaya Bay, allowing air operations to continue unopposed. The lack of anti-aircraft cover made it impossible for the minelayer Komintern to enter the harbour with reinforcements. The lack of supplies resulted in Soviet ammunition and fuel supplies slipping to critical levels on 20 June. The Luftwaffe was experiencing shortages of its own. The daily average of sorties was now reduced by 40 percent. Due to the shortages of bombs, all ordnance had to be dropped individually to minimise wastage. Some experienced crews had to conduct dive-bombing attacks 25–30 times a day. KG 51's Ju 88 crews in particular had felt the strain.

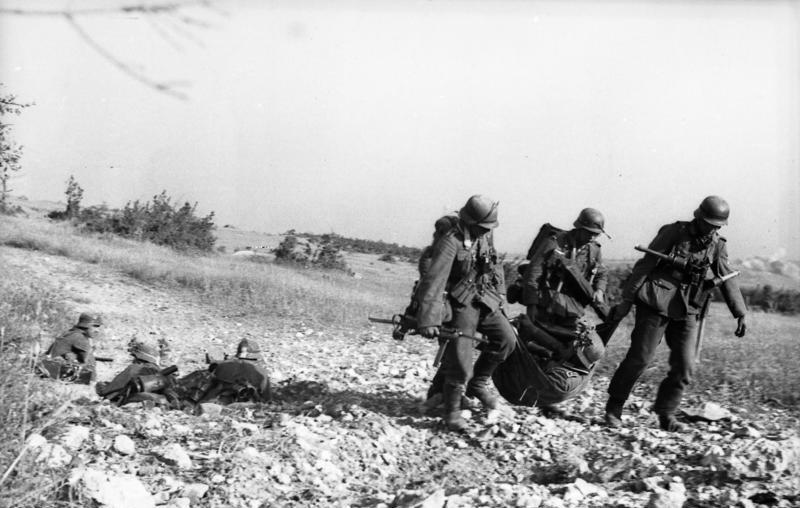
Three German soldiers transport a wounded comrade on 22 June during the battle for Sevastopol.

The pressure took its toll, and between 18 and 23 June, the entire Soviet defence line in the north collapsed. The remnants of the 95th Rifle Division was huddled into a 2 km square portion of coast line near Coastal Battery 12, north of the Bay. At 09:00 the battery and the division surrendered to the 132nd Infantry Division. Further south the 24th Infantry Division captured Bartenyevka, on the mouth of the Bay. The 22nd Infantry Division had reached the north of the Bay on the same day. The Soviet 138th Naval Brigade counterattacked, but it was destroyed without artillery and air support. On 20 June, the 24th Infantry Division tackled the main obstacle remaining on the north side of the Bay. The Lenin anti-aircraft position protected by the Northern Fort, a position which had a 5 metres wide anti-tank ditch, 1,000 mines, 32 concrete bunkers, seven armoured cupolas, and 70 earth-and-timber bunkers making it a formidable defensive position. The Lenin defences surrendered, having already lost three of their four 76 mm weapons. The Germans tried to use the remote-controlled mines to break into the North Fort, but they were knocked out. At 11:30 on 21 June the Fort fell after a sustained infantry attack. Around 182 Soviet prisoners were taken. The Germans began mopping up operations and clearing the northern shore. Most Soviet units were exhausted and out of ammunition, surrendering quickly. Others made attempts at a last stand. Some tried to evacuate across to the southern side by boat, but they were picked off by German artillery.

While the main actions were playing out in the north, XXX Corps alternated between attack and defence. The Soviet forces held the Sapun Ridge and could observe German movements. On occasion they could deliver effective counter battery fire. Between 21 and 28 June, the Germans lost 10 artillery pieces, including five 150 mm s. FH 18 medium howitzers. In the centre, the Romanians took up the slack. The 18th Infantry, 1st, and 4th Mountain Divisions, supported by 100 guns, gradually advanced up the Chernaya River towards the mouth of the river and Severnaya Bay. With support from LIV Corps on its left, the Axis captured all the Soviet defensive lines east of the Chernaya River.

The Luftwaffe had contributed 4,700 sorties in seven days up until 26 June. They dropped 3,984 tons of bombs. The daily average sorties had decreased 15 percent from the week before and 10 percent the week before that. The increasing operational readiness (49.8 to 64.5 percent) revealed the severity of bomb and fuel shortages. Von Wild, despite the withdrawal of some Geschwader for Operation Blue, did succeed in bringing in much needed reinforcements to bring the strength levels up to a standard not seen since the start of the offensive. The Luftwaffe continued the intense bombardment. On 26 June, its attacks supporting XXX Corps, devastated Soviet defences on the Sapun Ridge. It was the last Soviet defensive line between the Axis and Sevastopol.

==== Axis land, sea and air offensive: 29 June ====
A flanking attack by German assault boats on 29 June succeeded in taking the fortified southern shore of Severnaya Bay, greatly diminishing resistance against the capture of the city and harbor of Sevastopol.

==== Fall of Sevastopol: 30 June – 4 July ====
Oktyabrsky and Petrov were flown out at the last moment. Major General Pyotr Georgyevich Novikov took command of the defense. On 30 June, LIV Corps launched a heavy assault, supported by heavy Luftwaffe bombardment and several dozen guns. Heavy fighting took place for the next three days, but it was becoming clear that the Red Army could not hold their increasingly untenable positions for more than a day, at most. On 3 July, the last line of Soviet defense was breached. The following day, the last of the Soviet defenses were overrun and all organised resistance collapsed. The few remaining Red Army units continued to put up scattered resistance to the south of the city, which lasted until 9 July.

The fall of Sevastopol was announced by a special radio communique:

Above the city and port flutter the German and Romanian flags. German and Romanian troops under the command of Colonel General von Manstein, steadfastly supported by Colonel General von Richthofen's battle-hardened air corps, after twenty-five days of fierce battle, have as of midday today, taken the most powerful land and sea fortress of all that have ever existed in the world.

== German use of chemical weapons ==
During the heavy fighting, Red Army troops frequently fought from tunnel systems in Sevastopol's cave network. In response, German forces allegedly deployed illegal chemical weapons to clear these subterranean positions out. Chris Bellamy documents the use of toxic smoke used to asphyxiate Soviet defenders holding out in the underground cave systems.

German soldiers had deployed chemical weapons during the Crimean campaign, most notably on the Kerch Peninsula when Manstein's troops surrounded 7,000 Red Army troops who took refuge in the region's limestone caves and gassed them.

== Casualties and aftermath ==
The Germans claimed that over 90,000 Red Army soldiers had been taken prisoner, and a greater number killed. This claim appears to be overstated as, according to Soviet sources, the Soviet garrison defending Sevastopol totaled 106,000 men at the start of the siege plus 3,000 reinforcements during the attack. Further, it is known that 25,157 persons were evacuated, the overwhelming majority either wounded soldiers or officers evacuated on Stalin's orders.

Soviet records for Sevastopol indicated that the Red Army had lost 156,800 "irrecoverable losses" (killed and captured) between 30 December 1941, and 9 July 1942, plus another 53,601 sick and wounded.

The German victory had proven costly, with over 25,000 men killed in action of a total of 70,000 total casualties from 11th Army, including some 2,000 officers. The 250-day siege had also required massive expenditures in ammunition, with Axis forces using nearly 50,000 tons of artillery shells to clear the port, some 100 trainloads.

Romania's contribution was honored when the Crimea Shield in gold was first bestowed upon Marshal Ion Antonescu on 3 July 1942. It was awarded to him in Bucharest by Manstein, on Hitler's behalf. The second and last Golden Krimschild was awarded to Manstein himself, on 24 November 1942.

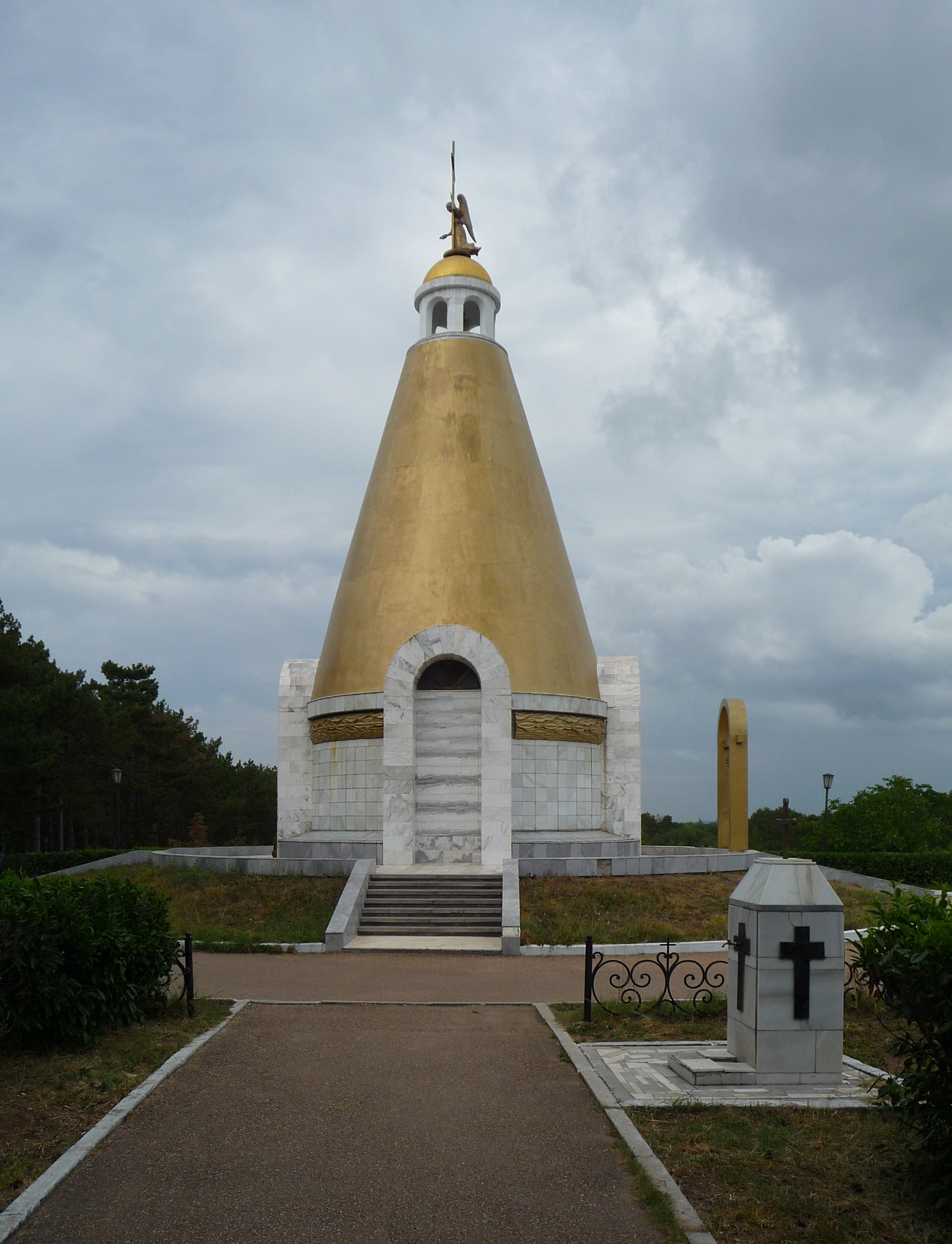
The Mount Sapun memorial

From 2 June to 3 July 8 Air Corps had flown 23,751 sorties and dropped 20,528 tons of bombs. German artillery had fired a further 46,750 tons of munitions, with total Axis munitions consumption coming to 67,278 tons over the course of one month. The Luftwaffe claimed to have destroyed 611 motor vehicles, 123 aircraft of which 18 on the ground, 38 artillery pieces, 10 tanks, a locomotive and a flak barge. Further destroyed were 48 Soviet artillery batteries, 28 barracks and industrial buildings, 20 bunkers, 11 ammunition depots, 10 fuel depots, a bridge and an observation post. Hundreds more motor vehicles had been damaged along with 7 artillery pieces, 43 artillery batteries, 2 barracks and another bridge. German aerial attacks had sunk 10,800 tons of Soviet shipping including 4 destroyers, a submarine, 3 motor torpedo boats, 6 coastal vessels and 4 freighters. 12,000 tons of shipping were also damaged, with 2 destroyers, 10 coastal vessels and 2 freighters among the losses.

Although ultimately a German success, the operation took much longer than the Germans had expected. Operation Blau, Army Group South's advance toward Stalingrad and the Caucasus, was just beginning, and the German offensive did not have the 11th Army to support it. Instead, the German 6th Army under Paulus was without crucial support, ultimately contributing to its defeat.
