= Nikolai Kharlamov (admiral) =

Nikolai Mikhailovich Kharlamov
- Никола́й Миха́йлович Харла́мов
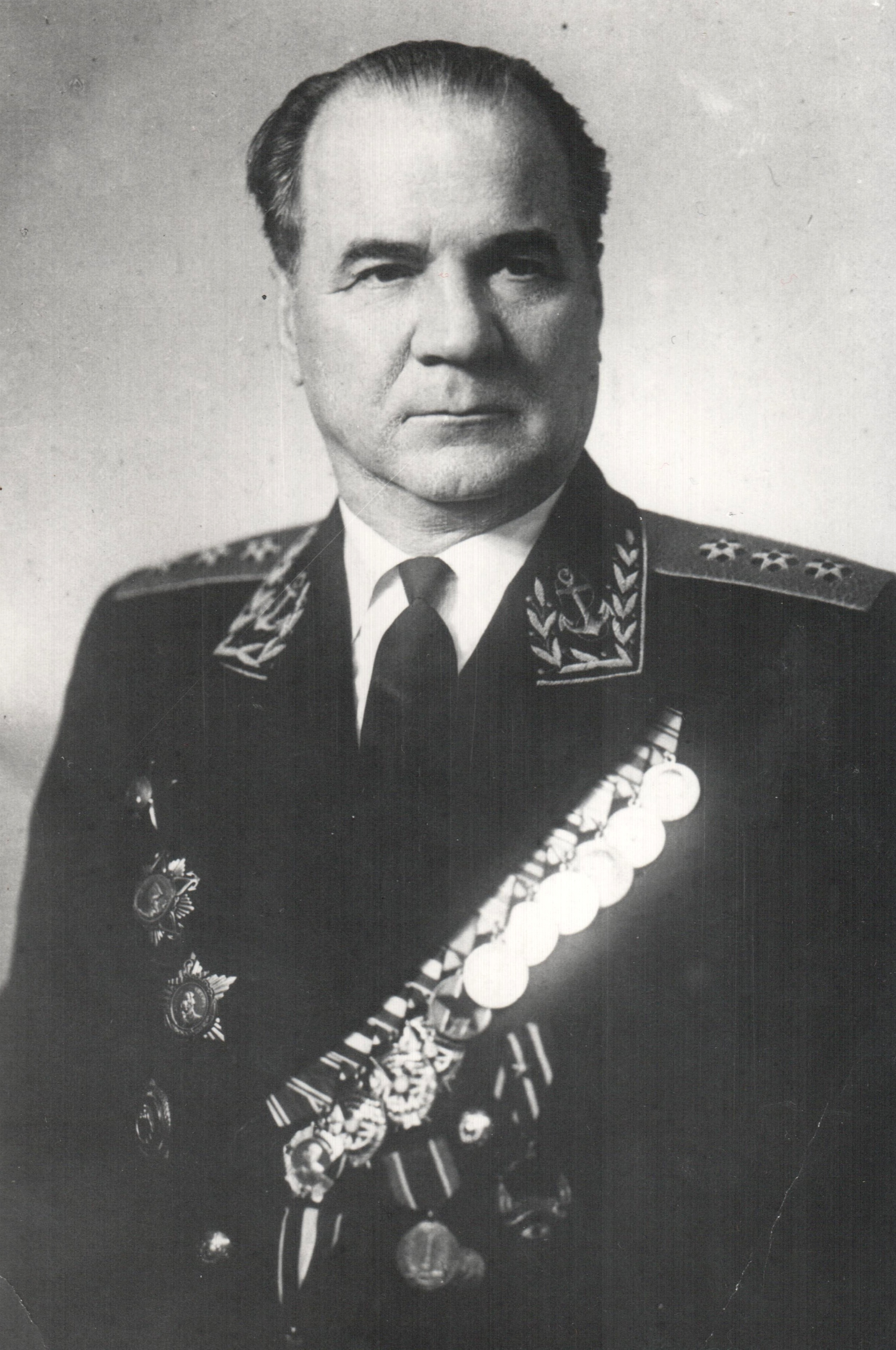
- Born: December 19, 1905; Zhukovka, Bryansky Uyezd, Oryol Governorate, Russian Empire (now Zhukovka, Bryansk Oblast, Russia)
- Died: April 9, 1983 (aged 77); Moscow, Russian SFSR, USSR (now Russia)
- Military career
- Service years: 1922 – 1971
- Commands: Destroyer Dzerzhinsky; Destroyer Bodry; Cruiser Voroshilov; 8th Fleet, Baltic Fleet; Baltic Fleet
- Conflicts: World War II
- Awards: Order of Lenin

Nikolai Mikhailovich Kharlamov (Russian: Никола́й Миха́йлович Харла́мов; 19 December 1905 – 9 April 1983) was a Soviet military leader and admiral.

== Early life ==
Kharlamov was born in the city of Zhukovka in the Oryol Governorate in 1905.

== Military career ==
In 1922, he joined the Soviet Navy and in 1925, he became member of the Communist Party of the Soviet Union. From 1924 to 1928, he was a student at the Naval Political School Named After S.G. Roshal and the M. V. Frunze Higher Naval School.

From October 1928, Kharlamov began his service in the Black Sea Fleet where he served as watch officer and supply manager of the destroyer Dzerzhinsky, artilleryman and assistant commander of the destroyer Frunze, and commander of the destroyers Dzerzhinsky, Bodry, and cruiser Voroshilov. In February 1938, he was appointed as Chief of Staff of the Black Sea Fleet.

He graduated from advanced training courses for senior officers at the Naval Academy named K. E. Voroshilov and Naval Department of the Military Academy of the General Staff in 1941. From April 1941, he served as head of the Combat Training Directorate of the Navy.

=== World War II ===
Following the outbreak of Operation Barbarossa in June 1941, Kharlamov was sent to Great Britain and the United States as part of the Soviet military mission led by General Filipp Golikov. Already in London on 20 July 1941, he was appointed naval attaché at the Soviet Embassy in Great Britain and remained in this post until October 1944.

He managed to establish effective interaction with the British military circles and even with the leadership of the MI6 and provided the Soviet leadership with a significant amount of intelligence information.

Kharlamov carried out communication with the British Admiralty, including the organization of Arctic convoys to the Soviet Arctic port city of Murmansk. He made a significant contribution to the discovery of the opening of Second Front in Europe and also participated in Operation Overlord aboard HMS Mauritius.

From 20 November 1944, he served as head of department and deputy head of the Main Naval Staff of the Navy.

=== Post war ===
After the war, Kharlamov served as deputy chief of the General Staff of the Armed Forces for Naval Forces from 1946 to 1950 and commander of the 8th Fleet of the Baltic Fleet from 1950 to 1954. In July 1956, he was appointed as head of the Naval Department of the Higher Military Academy Named After K. E. Voroshilov. From November 1956 to May 1959, he served as commander of the Baltic Fleet.

In May 1959, he was sent to China where he served as a military specialist in the People's Liberation Army Navy. From 1961 to 1971, he worked in a responsible position in the Central Office of the Navy and at the same time served as chairman of the Naval Scientific and Technical Committee of the Navy. Kharlamov retired from military service in August 1971.

He also served as people's deputy at the 4th and 5th convocation sessions of the Supreme Soviet of the Soviet Union from 1954 to 1962.

== Later life ==
Kharlamov died on 9 April 1983 and was buried at the Kuntsevo Cemetery in Moscow.

== Dates of rank ==
- Komandarm 1st rank, Soviet Navy: 15 December 1936
- Rear Admiral, Soviet Navy: 4 June 1940
- Vice Admiral, Soviet Navy: 21 July 1944
- Admiral, Soviet Navy: 11 May 1949

== Awards and decorations ==
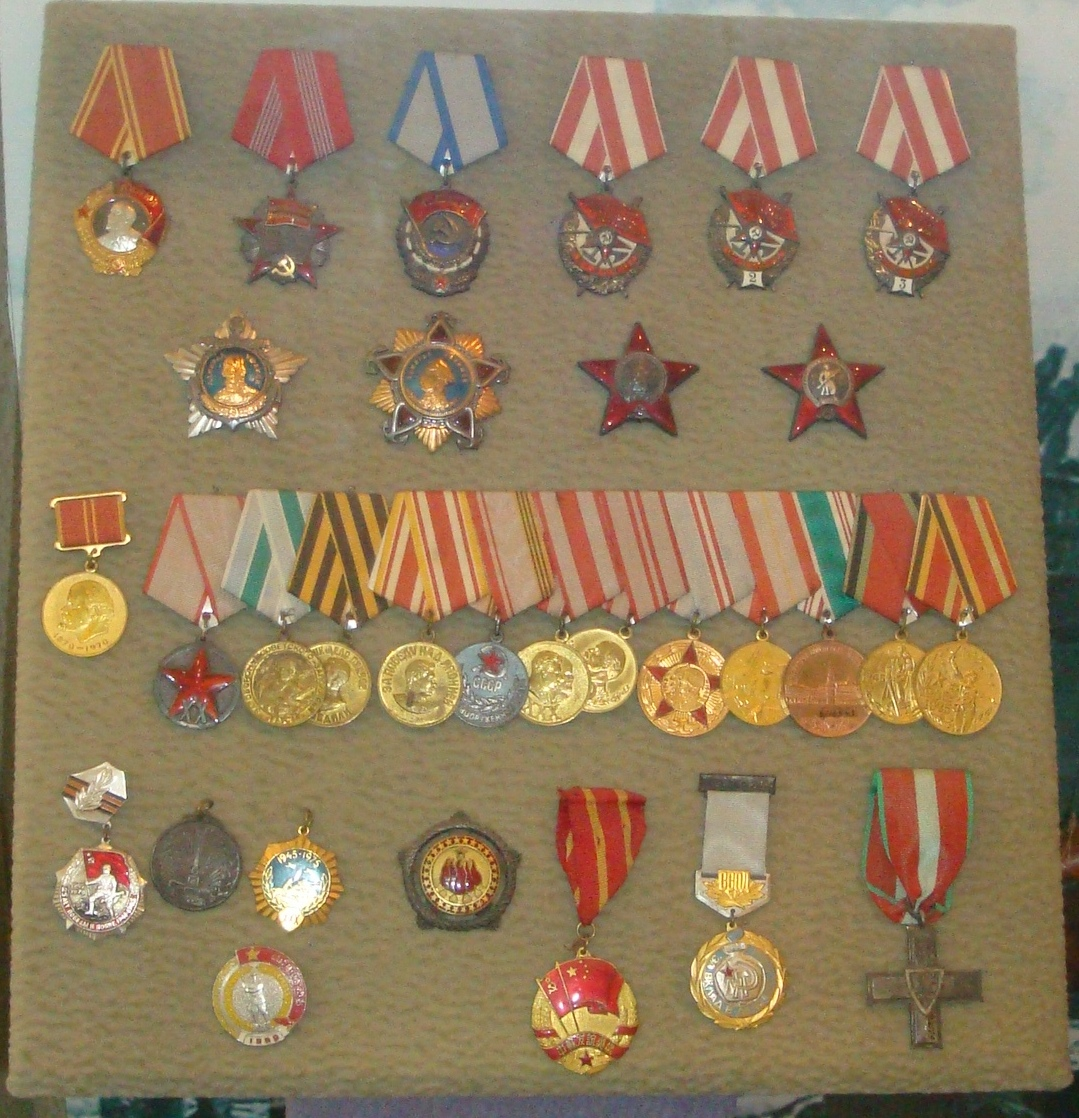
Kharlamov's awards on display at the Central Armed Forces Museum in Moscow

His awards include:

Soviet Union

Order of Lenin (1947)
Order of the October Revolution (1975)
Order of the Red Banner, thrice (1944, 3 November 1944, 1953)
Order of Ushakov, 1st class (28 June 1945)
Order of Nakhimov, 1st class (14 September 1945)
Order of the Red Banner of Labour
Order of the Red Star, twice (1938, 1965)
Medal "For the Defence of the Soviet Transarctic" (1944)
Medal "For the Victory over Germany in the Great Patriotic War 1941–1945" (1945)
Medal "For the Victory over Japan" (1945)
Jubilee Medal "Twenty Years of Victory in the Great Patriotic War 1941–1945" (1965)
Jubilee Medal "Thirty Years of Victory in the Great Patriotic War 1941–1945" (1975)
Medal "Veteran of the Armed Forces of the USSR" (1976)
Jubilee Medal "In Commemoration of the 100th Anniversary of the Birth of Vladimir Ilyich Lenin" (1969)
Jubilee Medal "XX Years of the Workers' and Peasants' Red Army" (1938)
Jubilee Medal "30 Years of the Soviet Army and Navy" (1948)
Jubilee Medal "40 Years of the Armed Forces of the USSR" (1958)
Jubilee Medal "50 Years of the Armed Forces of the USSR" (1968)
Jubilee Medal "60 Years of the Armed Forces of the USSR" (1978)
Medal "In Commemoration of the 800th Anniversary of Moscow" (1947)
Medal "In Commemoration of the 250th Anniversary of Leningrad" (1957)

Foreign

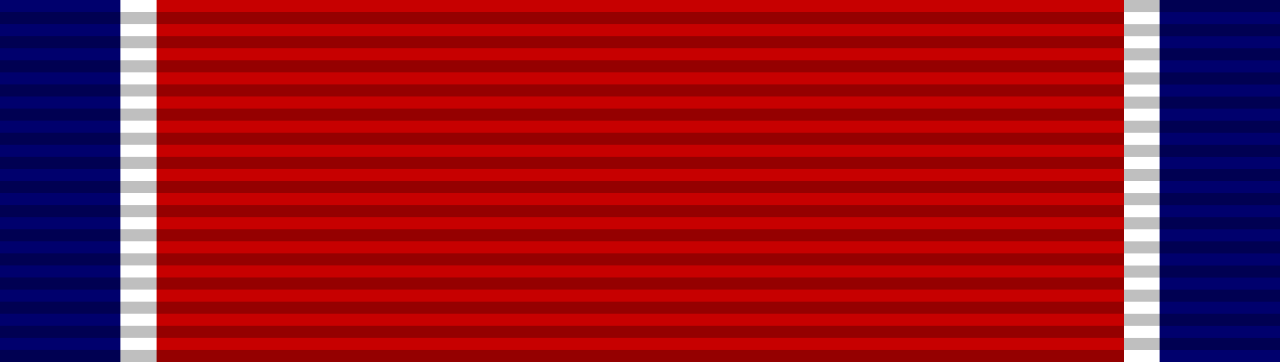
Medal of Sino-Soviet Friendship (China)
Medal for the Liberation of Korea (North Korea)
Order of the Cross of Grunwald, 3rd Class (Poland)
Order of Brotherhood and Unity, 1st Class (Yugoslavia)

=== Other honors ===
An Udaloy-class destroyer of the Soviet and Russian Navy Admiral Kharlamov was commissioned in honor of him on 1 April 1990 and was assigned to the Northern Fleet. The destroyer was decommissioned on 2 December 2020.
