= Rodion Malinovsky =

Marshal of the Soviet Union (1898–1967)

Marshal of the Soviet Union Rodion Malinovsky
- Родион Малиновский
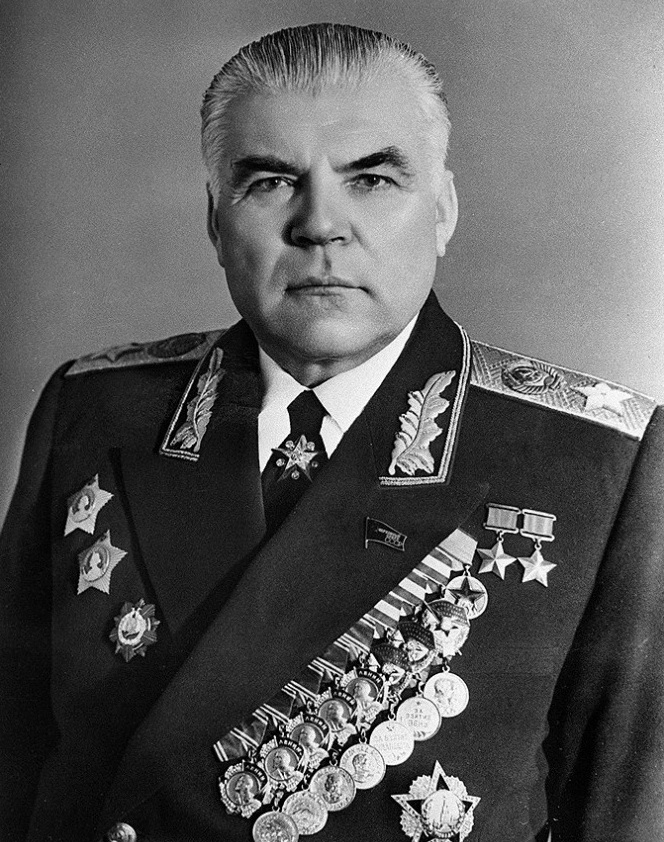
- Malinovsky in 1958

Minister of Defence of the Soviet Union
- In office 26 October 1957 – 31 March 1967
- President: Nikita Khrushchev; Leonid Brezhnev
- Preceded by: Georgy Zhukov
- Succeeded by: Andrei Grechko

Personal details
- Born: 23 November 1898 Odessa, Russian Empire
- Died: 31 March 1967 (aged 68) Moscow, Russian SFSR, Soviet Union
- Resting place: Kremlin Wall Necropolis, Moscow
- Party: Communist Party of the Soviet Union (1926–1967)
- Spouse(s): Larisa (1925–1946), Raisa (1946–1967)
- Awards: Hero of the Soviet Union (2)

Military service
- Allegiance: Russian Empire (1914–1917); France (1917–1919); Russian SFSR (1919–1922); Soviet Union (1922–1967)
- Branch/service: Imperial Russian Army; Red Army; Soviet Army
- Years of service: 1914–1967
- Rank: Marshal of the Soviet Union (1944–1967)
- Commands: Southern Front; 66th Army; 2nd Guards Army; Southwestern Front; 3rd Ukrainian Front; 2nd Ukrainian Front; Transbaikal Military District; Far Eastern Military District
- Battles/wars: World War I; Russian Civil War; Spanish Civil War; World War II; Great Patriotic War; Second Battle of Kharkov; Battle of Stalingrad; Dnieper–Carpathian offensive; First Jassy–Kishinev offensive; Second Jassy–Kishinev offensive; Budapest offensive; Siege of Budapest; Bratislava–Brno offensive; Soviet–Japanese War; Manchurian offensive; Khingan–Mukden Operation; Occupation of Manchuria; Cuban Missile Crisis

Rodion Yakovlevich Malinovsky (Russian: Родио́н Я́ковлевич Малино́вский; Ukrainian: Родіо́н Я́кович Малино́вський, romanized: Rodion Yakovych Malynovskyi; 23 November [O.S. 11 November] 1898 – 31 March 1967) was a Soviet military commander and Marshal of the Soviet Union. He served as Minister of Defence of the Soviet Union from 1957 to 1967, during which he oversaw the strengthening of the Soviet Army.

Born to an impoverished Ukrainian household in Odessa, Malinovsky volunteered for the Imperial Russian Army during the First World War and served with distinction in both the German Front and the Western Front. He was serving in the Russian Legion in France on the outbreak of the October Revolution, after which he returned to Russia and joined the Red Army in the Russian Civil War. After graduating from the Frunze Military Academy, Malinovsky volunteered to fight on the Republican side during the Spanish Civil War, where he again served with great distinction and was later awarded the Order of Lenin and the Order of the Red Banner in recognition of his service.

Malinovsky emerged as one of the few competent Soviet generals in the opening phase of the German invasion. He played a crucial role in the Soviet victory at Stalingrad in December 1942, and helped drive German troops out of Ukraine following the Dnieper–Carpathian offensive. He then commanded the Soviet drive into the Balkans, forcing Romania to switch to the Allied side, for which he was made a Marshal of the Soviet Union by Joseph Stalin. He further took part in the liberation of Budapest, Vienna and Prague, cementing Soviet military supremacy in Central Europe. After the German surrender in May 1945, Malinovsky was transferred to the Far East, where he defeated the Japanese Kwantung Army in the Soviet invasion of Manchuria. He received the Soviet Union's highest distinction, the title Hero of the Soviet Union, as a reward.

After the war, Malinovsky remained in the Far East and held a succession of important commands. After Stalin's death, Nikita Khrushchev recalled Malinovsky to Moscow and named him commander-in-chief of the Soviet Ground Forces. In 1957, he replaced the ousted Georgy Zhukov as Minister of Defence, a position he served until his death. Malinovsky was a strong advocate for the importance of conventional forces, and maintained a delicate balance with Khrushchev's missile-based approach regarding Soviet military policy. He retained considerable autonomy in military affairs following the fall of Khrushchev in 1964. Malinovsky died in March 1967 from pancreatic cancer, and is remembered as one of the most important military leaders in Russian and Soviet history.

== Early life ==
=== Before and during World War I ===
A Ukrainian, Malinovsky was born in Odessa to a single mother, after his father either died or abandoned the family. The ethnic background of his father is disputed. Some claim he was a Karaite Jew; however, others claim he was descended from a noble family in the Tambov Governorate. Malinovsky's mother soon left the city for the rural areas of Southern Russia, and married. Her husband, a poverty-stricken peasant, refused to adopt her son and expelled him when Malinovsky was only 13 years old. The homeless boy survived by working as a farmhand, and eventually received shelter from his aunt's family in Odessa, where he worked as an errand boy in a general store. After the start of World War I in July 1914, Malinovsky, who was only 15 years old at the time (too young for military service), hid on the military train heading for the German front, but was discovered. He nevertheless convinced the commanding officers to enlist him as a volunteer, and served in a machine-gun detachment in the frontline trenches. In October 1915, as a reward for repelling a German attack, he received his first military award, the Cross of St. George of the 4th class, and was promoted to the rank of corporal. Soon afterwards, he was badly wounded and spent several months in the hospital.

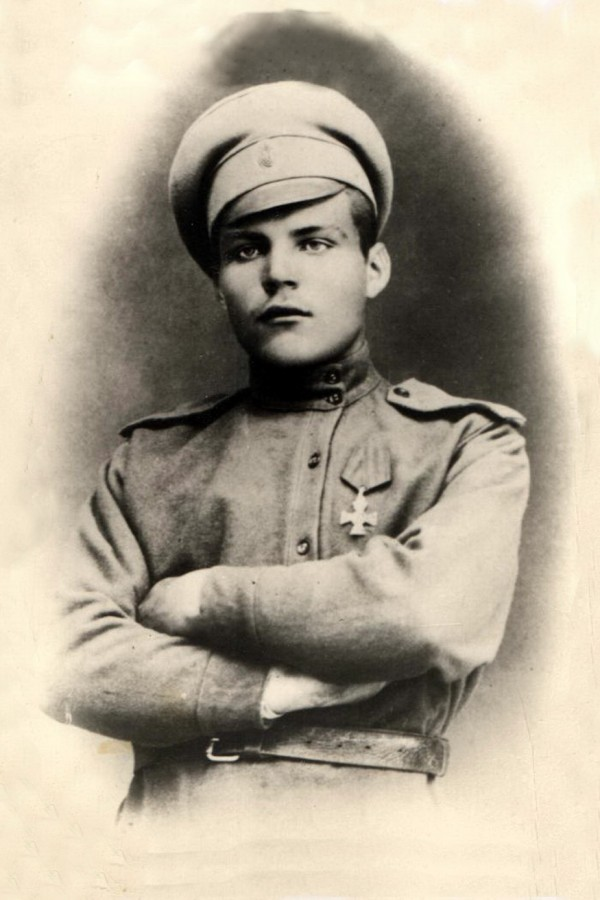
Malinovsky during WWI

After his recovery, he was sent to France in 1916 as a member of the Western Front Russian Expeditionary Corps. Malinovsky fought in a hotly contested sector of the front near Fort Brion and was promoted to sergeant. He suffered a serious wound in his left arm, and received a decoration from the French government. After the Bolshevik Revolution in Russia, the French government disbanded some Russian units, but others were transferred to a newly created unit called the Russian Legion, which was attached to the Moroccan Division. Malinovsky fought against the Germans until the end of the war. During this time, he was awarded the French Croix de guerre and promoted to senior NCO.

=== Interwar ===
He returned to Odessa in 1919, where he joined the Red Army in the Civil War against the White Army and fought with distinction in Siberia. He remained in the army after the end of the conflict, studying in the training school for the junior commanders, and rose to commander of a rifle battalion. In 1926, he became a member of the Communist Party of the Soviet Union, membership of which was a prerequisite for promotion in the military.

In 1927, Malinovsky was sent to study at the elite Frunze Military Academy. He graduated in 1930, and during the next seven years he rose to the Chief of Staff of the 3rd Cavalry Corps, where his commander was Semyon Timoshenko (a protégé of Joseph Stalin).

After the start of the Spanish Civil War in 1936, Malinovsky volunteered to fight for the Republicans against the right-wing nationalists of General Francisco Franco and their Italian and German allies. He participated in planning and directing several main operations. In 1938, he returned to Moscow, being awarded the top Soviet decorations, the Order of Lenin and the Order of the Red Banner, in recognition of his service in Spain; he was appointed a senior lecturer at the Frunze Military Academy.

In the spring of 1941, Timoshenko, who then served the People's Commissar for Defence, was alarmed by the massive German military buildup on the Soviet borders, as the Wehrmacht was secretly preparing for Operation Barbarossa. In order to strengthen the Red Army field command, he dispatched some of the top officers from the military academies to the field units. Malinovsky was promoted to Major General, and took command over the freshly raised 48th Rifle Corps, 9th Army in the Odessa Military District. A week prior to the start of the war, Malinovsky deployed his corps close to the Romanian border.

== World War II ==
=== Early assignments ===
After Germany invaded the Soviet Union in June 1941, with the Red Army suffering enormous defeats and losing hundreds of thousands of troops in German encirclements, Malinovsky emerged a competent general. His corps of three partly formed rifle divisions faced German Blitzkrieg along the line of the Prut River. While, as a rule, Red Army generals would lead their forces from behind the frontline, Malinovsky went to the crucial sectors of the battles to be with his soldiers and encourage them. Unable to stop the Wehrmacht, Malinovsky had to retreat along the Black Sea shore, while frustrating enemy attempts to encircle his troops. The Germans succeeded in cornering his corps in Nikolaev, but Malinovsky breached their ring and retreated to Dnipropetrovsk.

In August, he was promoted to Chief of Staff of the badly battered 6th Army, and soon replaced its commander. He halted the German advance in his section of the front and was promoted to Lieutenant General. After the retreat of the Red Army to the Donbas, Malinovsky commanded a joint operation of the 6th and 12th armies, managing to drive the Wehrmacht out of the region. In December 1941, Malinovsky received command of the Southern Front, consisting of three weak field armies and two division-sized cavalry corps. They were short of manpower and equipment, but Malinovsky managed to push deep into the defenses of the Germans, who, after 6 months of fighting, were suffering from fatigue and shortages as well.

=== Battle of Kharkov ===
On 12 May 1942, Malinovsky and the Southwestern Front, under the overall command of Timoshenko, launched a joint attack in the Second Battle of Kharkov pushing the Germans back 100 kilometres (62 mi). Timoshenko overestimated the Red Army's offensive capabilities and suffered a heavy defeat. Although Stalin, in spite of opposition by his top military advisers, supported the ill-fated Kharkov attack, he became suspicious that Malinovsky had intentionally failed his troops (he feared that Malinovsky had established and kept connections with foreign interests during his World War I stay in France). In July 1942, the Southern Front was taken out of combat, its units and staff were transferred to the North Caucasian Front as a Don Operational Group under the command of Malinovsky (who also became Front's deputy commander). Stalin ordered Malinovsky to stop the intrusion of the German Army Group A towards Rostov-on-Don and the vital oilfields of Caucasus; the Germans had a sizeable technical superiority over Malinovsky, and cut through his weak defenses. As a consequence, Stavka disbanded the Don Operational Group in September.

=== Stalingrad and Ukrainian Front ===
The Red Army was hard-pressed by Germans in the Battle of Stalingrad, and Stalin entrusted Malinovsky with the command of the hastily formed 66th Army to hold positions north-east of Stalingrad. At the same time Stalin ordered Nikita Khrushchev, who served as his top political officer in Stalingrad, to "keep an eye" on Malinovsky.

The 66th Army had no combat experience, but this was the first time in the war Malinovsky had commanded a unit that was near full strength in both troops and equipment. In September and October 1942, he went on the offensive. His territorial gains were marginal, but he denied the Germans an opportunity to encircle Stalingrad from the north, and, slowed down, they decided to push into the city. Later that month, Stavka dispatched Malinovsky to the Voronezh Front as its deputy commander; in December 1942, he was sent back to Stalingrad. There the Red Army achieved its greatest success to that point in the war: on 22 November the Red Army fronts encircled the German Sixth Army. The German Army Group Don, commanded by Field Marshal Erich von Manstein, gathered its Panzer troops in the town of Kotelnikovo 150 kilometres (93 mi) west of Stalingrad and launched a desperate counterattack to save the Sixth Army.

Malinovsky led the powerful Soviet Second Guards Army against Hoth. In vicious fighting he forced the Germans to retreat, breached deeply echeloned, well-prepared German defenses, and destroyed the Kotelnikovo army grouping. It was the first World War II large-scale clash of armor to be lost by Germany. Malinovsky's victory sealed the fate of 250,000 German and other Axis powers soldiers trapped in the Stalingrad pocket. Stalin promoted Malinovsky to colonel general, and awarded him the highest Soviet decoration for outstanding generalship — the Order of Suvorov of the 1st degree.

In February 1943, Malinovsky resumed his command of Southern Front, and in less than two weeks he expelled Manstein from Rostov-on-Don, opening the road to Ukraine to the Red Army. In March 1943, Stalin elevated him to the rank of Army General and gave him command of Southwestern Front, tasked to drive German troops away from the industrially rich Donbas. Through a sudden attack in mid-October, Malinovsky managed to surprise a large German force in the region's key city of Zaporizhia and captured it. The campaign split German forces in the South and isolated German forces in Crimea from the rest of the German Eastern Front.

On 20 October, the Southwestern Front was renamed 3rd Ukrainian Front. From December 1943 to April 1944, Malinovsky smashed the German Army Group South, and liberated much of the southern Ukraine, including Kherson, Nikolaev and his home city of Odessa. By that time, according to Khrushchev's opinion, Stalin grew much more confident of Malinovsky's loyalty.

=== Romania and Hungary ===
In May 1944, Malinovsky was transferred to the 2nd Ukrainian Front. He expelled the Germans from the remaining Soviet territory and participated in an unsuccessful invasion of the Balkans (the first Jassy–Kishinev Offensive) together with Marshal Ivan Konev and Army General Fyodor Tolbukhin (who received Malinovsky's former command over the smaller 3rd Ukrainian Front). However, during the second Jassy–Kishinev Offensive in late August and early September 1944, Malinovsky unleashed a highly successful Soviet version of the Blitzkrieg. Together with Tolbukhin, he destroyed or captured some 215,000 German, and 200,000 Romanian troops, forcing Romania to overthrow pro-German Conducător Ion Antonescu, and switch from the Axis to the Allies camp (see Romania during World War II). A triumphant Stalin recalled Malinovsky to Moscow, and on 10 September 1944 made him Marshal of the Soviet Union. Malinovsky was also nominal head of the Allied Commission in Romania (represented by Vladislav Petrovich Vinogradov).

He continued his offensive drive, crossed the Southern Carpathians into Transylvania (entering Hungarian-ruled Northern Transylvania), and on 20 October 1944, captured Debrecen, defended by a large Axis force. His troops were tired after several months of combat and needed to be replenished and resupplied, but Stalin ordered Malinovsky to take the Hungarian capital Budapest, in order to open the road to Vienna and take Vienna before the Western Allies. With the help of Tolbukhin and the Romanian First and Fourth armies, Malinovsky carried out Stalin's order, and faced Adolf Hitler's determination to defend Budapest at any cost. The Germans and their Hungarian Arrow Cross Party allies tried to turn Budapest into a "German Stalingrad"; Hitler engaged the bulk of his Panzer troops (among them six Waffen SS divisions and five army Panzer divisions; one-fourth of the Wehrmacht's armor), weakening German forces fighting the Red Army in Poland and Prussia, as well as those engaging the Western Allies on the Rhine. Malinovsky's strategic and operational skills enabled him to overcome his troops' weakness and to conquer Budapest on 13 February 1945, following an exceptionally harsh battle. He captured 70,000 prisoners. Continuing his drive westward, Malinovsky routed Germans in Slovakia, liberated Bratislava, on 4 April 1945 captured Vienna, and finally, on 26 April 1945 freed Brno, second largest city in Czechoslovakia.

These new victories established the Soviet's supremacy over the Danubian heartland of Europe. In return, Stalin rewarded him with the highest Soviet military decoration of the period, the Order of Victory. Malinovsky ended his campaign in Europe with the liberation of Brno in the Czech lands, observing a jubilant meeting of his and American advance forces.

=== Japanese Front and Far East Command ===
After the German surrender in May 1945, Malinovsky was transferred to the Russian Far East, where he was placed in command of the Transbaikal Front. In August 1945, he led his forces during the last Soviet offensive of the war under the overall command of Aleksandr Vasilevsky. Vasilevsky's forces invaded Manchuria, which was under the occupation of the 700,000 strong Japanese Kwantung Army and crushed the Japanese in ten days. Malinovsky was awarded the Soviet Union's greatest honor, the order of a Hero of the Soviet Union, and was appointed a member of the Supreme Soviet of the Soviet Union by Stalin himself. Following the Japanese surrender, Malinovsky was made supreme commander of the Far Eastern Military District. During the Soviet occupation of North Korea, Malinovsky was an influential figure in the establishment and training of the Korean People's Army, and continued to provide support for them during the early phases of the Korean War.

== Minister of Defence ==
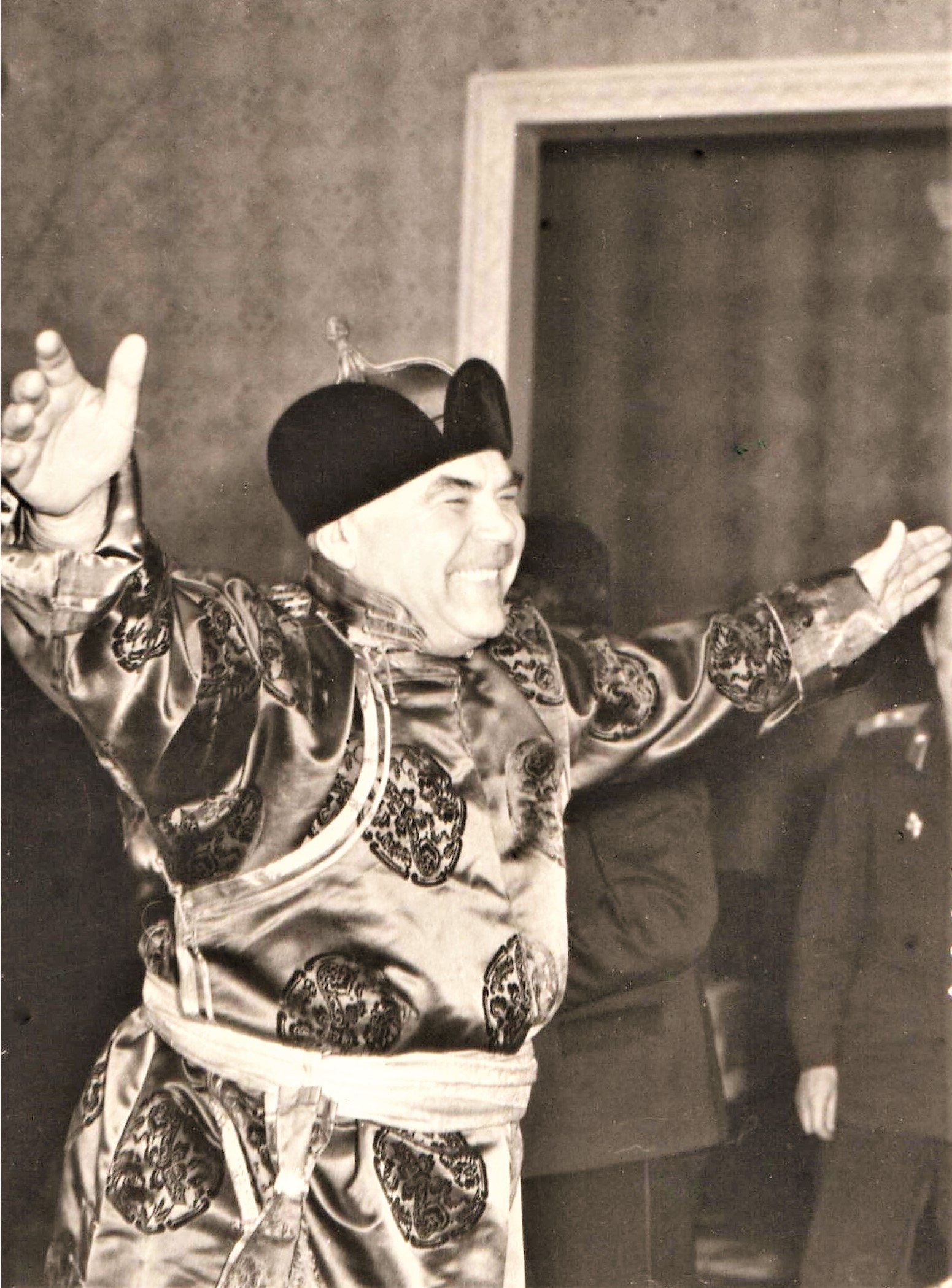
Malinovsky as Minister of Defence wearing traditional Mongolian clothing during an official visit to Mongolia, 1961

After Stalin's death in 1953, Khrushchev became the Soviet leader and, during the De-Stalinization process and the consolidation of his power in the Kremlin, he promoted Malinovsky to Commander-in-Chief of the Soviet Ground Forces and First Deputy to Minister of Defense Marshal Georgy Zhukov. To confirm Malinovsky's high status in the Soviet Party-state hierarchy, he was selected a full member of the Communist Party Central Committee. In October 1957, Khrushchev, who had grown apprehensive of Zhukov's political ambitions, ousted him and entrusted his post as minister to Malinovsky, who served in this position until his death. Although a personal friend of Khrushchev, Malinovsky maintained his independent position regarding military affairs. Khrushchev and several members of the Soviet military establishment were convinced that future wars would be won by nuclear missile attack. They advocated main investment to the development of the missiles and a drastic reduction of conventional forces. Malinovsky supported the adoption of strategic nuclear missiles, but saw them as a useful deterrent of war, rather than as a main weapon within it. He developed the concept of a broad-based military and vigorously argued that while the nature of war had changed, the decisive factor would still be a standing army proficient in modern military technology and capable of conquering and controlling the enemy's territory. Soviet military policy during these years was a compromise between the views of Malinovsky and of Khrushchev.

The Cuban Missile Crisis, which brought the world to the brink of nuclear catastrophe alienated Malinovsky. Following the crisis, he publicly demanded in army publications for the military to be given a greater say in formulating Soviet strategic policy. The army's discontent with Khrushchev encouraged a coup within the Party, which resulted in the removal of Khrushchev from power in October 1964. The new Party leadership accepted Malinovsky's demand for an autonomous and professional military establishment, as well as his concept of balanced development of the armed forces.

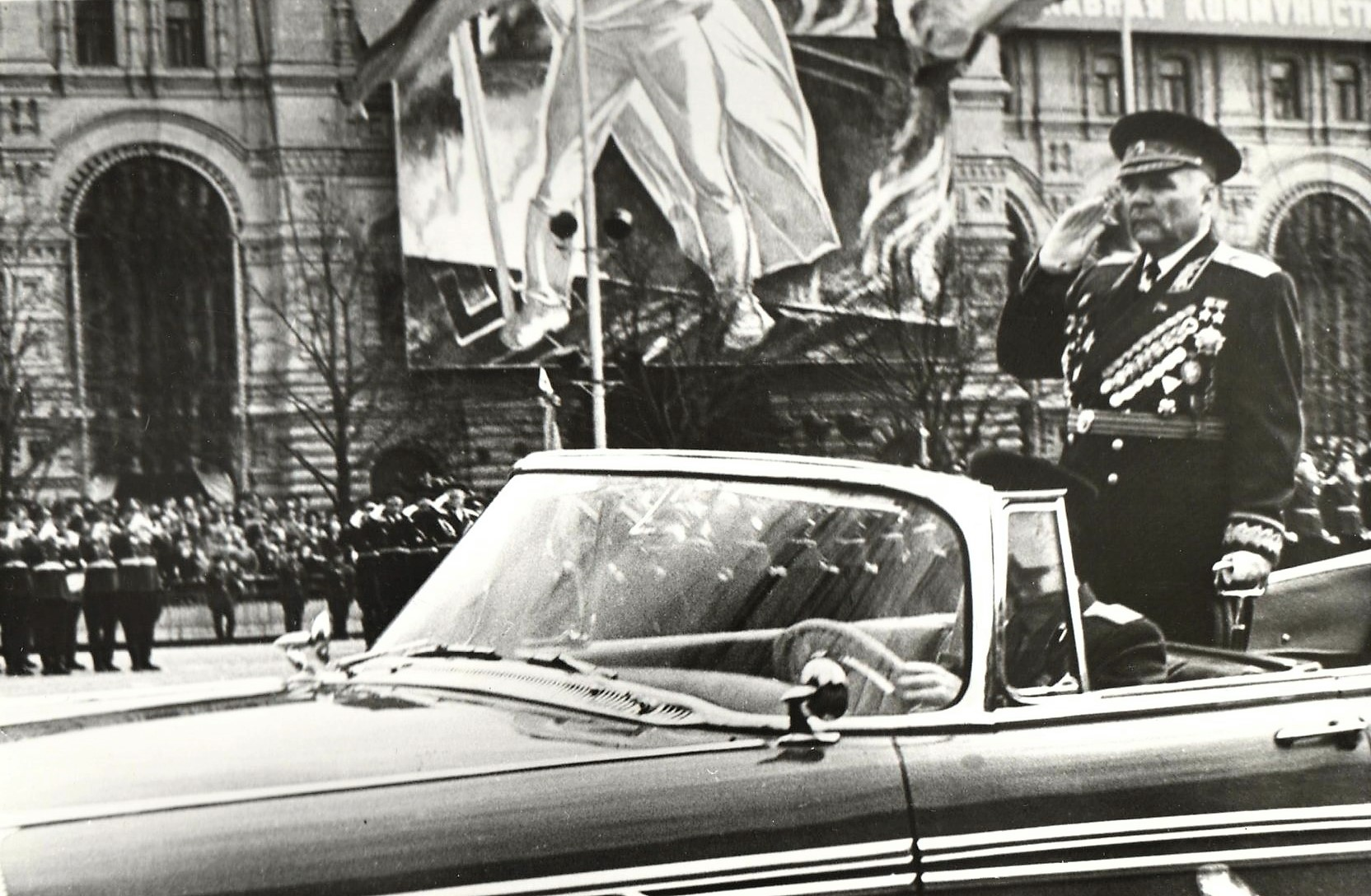
Malinovsky takes the salute during the 1965 Moscow Victory Day Parade, 9 May 1965.

In a meeting in Romania in November 1964, between USSR and Chinese delegations, Malinovsky worsened Sino-Soviet relations, already deeply frayed in the Sino-Soviet split. Historian Daniel Leese noted that improvement of the relations "that had seemed possible after Khrushchev's fall evaporated" as they became more elusive after an allegedly drunken Malinovsky approached Chinese Marshal He Long, member of the Chinese delegation to Moscow, and asked when China would finally eliminate Mao Zedong in the manner in which the CPSU eliminated Khrushchev, "we've already got rid of Khrushchev, you should get rid of Mao Zedong." Outraged, He Long reported the incident to Premier of China Zhou Enlai, who in turn, reported the incident to Soviet Premier Leonid Brezhnev. China refused to accept the Soviet Union's apology.

Malinovsky was a staunch opponent of U.S. involvement in the Vietnam War, accusing the Americans of waging a "murderous war against the Vietnamese people". In response to escalating U.S. aggression, Malinovsky called for a major Soviet military buildup. He also criticized China's involvement in the war, accusing the Chinese government of obstructing Soviet aid to North Vietnam.

== Death and legacy ==
Malinovsky died from pancreatic cancer on 31 March 1967. He was honoured with a state funeral and cremated. His urn was placed in the Kremlin Wall Necropolis. The government gave his name to the leading Soviet Military Academy of Tank Troops in Moscow and to the 10th Guards Uralsko-Lvovskaya Tank Division. Malinovsky continued to be regarded as one of the most important military leaders in the history of Russia even after the dissolution of the Soviet Union.

== Awards ==
Russian Empire

Cross of St. George, 3rd class
Cross of St. George, 4th class

Awards of the USSR

Hero of the Soviet Union, twice (8 September 1945, 22 November 1958)
Order of Victory (No. 8, 26 April 1945)
Order of Lenin, five times (17 July 1937, 6 November 1941, 21 February 1945, 8 September 1945, 22 November 1958)
Order of the Red Banner, three times (22 October 1937, 3 November 1944, 15 November 1950)
Order of Suvorov, 1st class, twice (January 28, 1943 March 19, 1944)
Order of Kutuzov, 1st class (17 September 1943)
Medal "For the Defence of Stalingrad"
Medal "For the Defence of the Caucasus"
Medal "For the Defence of Odessa"
Medal "For the Capture of Budapest"
Medal "For the Capture of Vienna"
Medal "For the Victory over Japan"
Medal "For the Victory over Germany in the Great Patriotic War 1941–1945"
Jubilee Medal "Twenty Years of Victory in the Great Patriotic War 1941–1945"
Jubilee Medal "XX Years of the Workers' and Peasants' Red Army"
Jubilee Medal "30 Years of the Soviet Army and Navy"
Jubilee Medal "40 Years of the Armed Forces of the USSR"

Foreign Awards

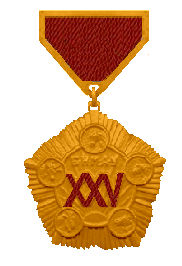
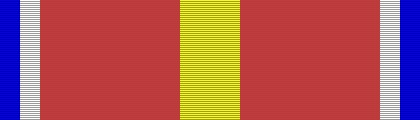
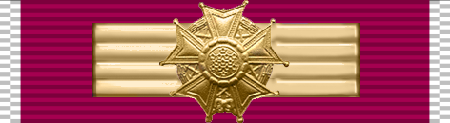
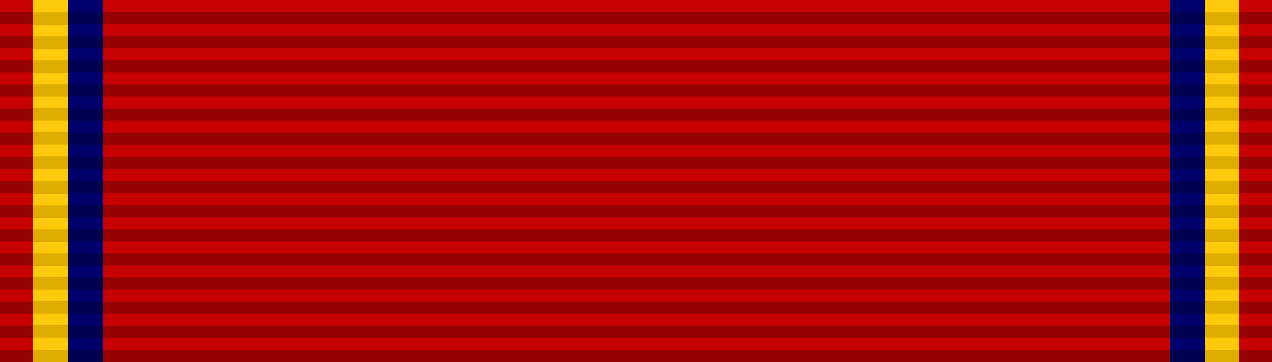
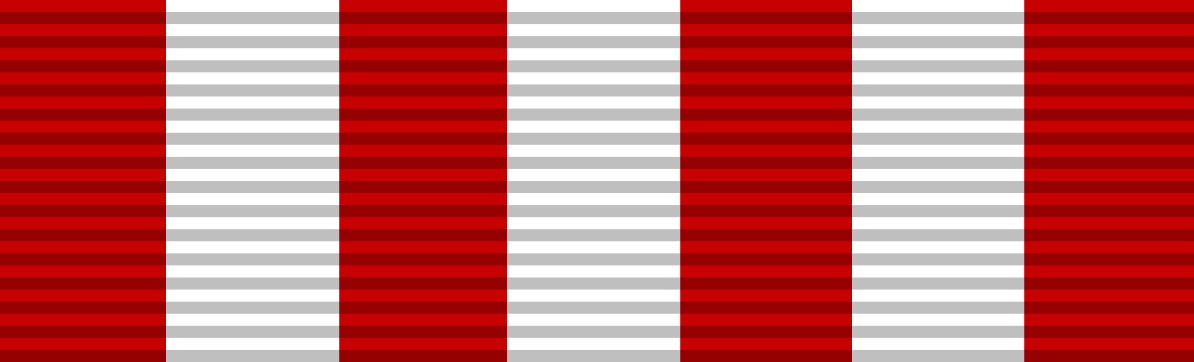
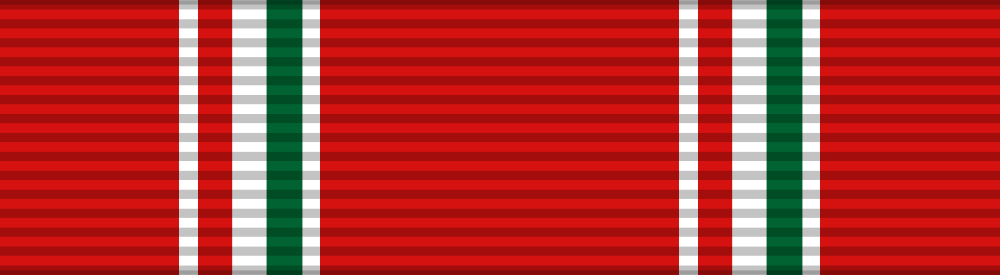
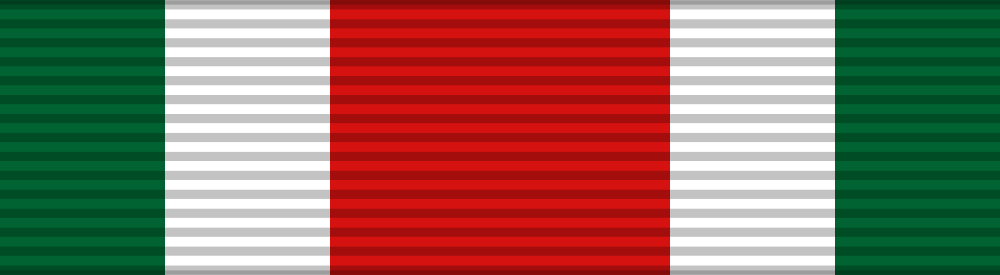
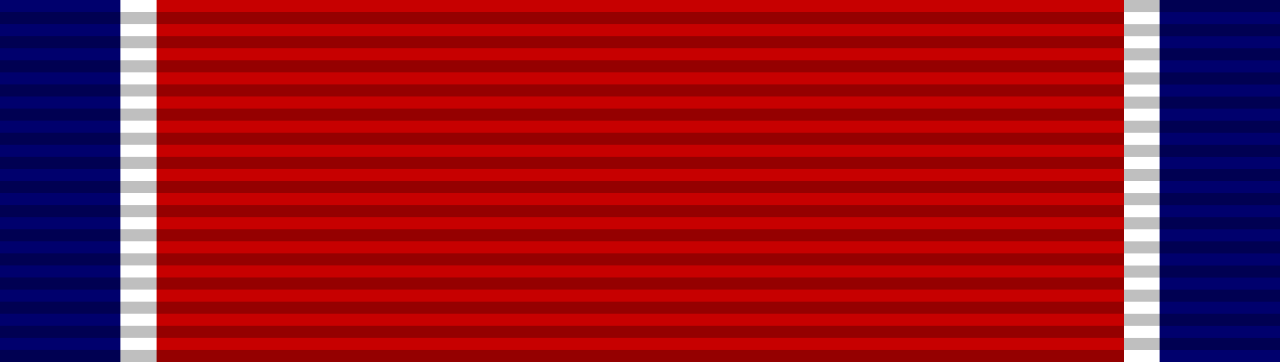
	Medal "25 Years of the Mongolian People's Revolution" (Mongolia, 1946)
	Order of Sukhbaatar (Mongolia, 1961)
	Order of the Red Banner (Mongolia, 1945)
	Medal "For Victory over Japan" (Mongolia, 1946)
	Order of the People's Hero (Yugoslavia, 27 May 1964)
	Golden Order of the Partisan Star (Yugoslavia, 1956)
	Order of the White Lion, 1st class (Czechoslovakia, 1945)
	Military Order of the White Lion, 1st class (Czechoslovakia, 1945)
	Czechoslovak War Cross (Czechoslovakia, 1945)
	Medal "In Commemoration of the Battle of Dukla Pass (Czechoslovakia, 1959)
	Medal "25 Years of the Slovak National Uprising" (Czechoslovakia, 1965)
	Chief Commander, Legion of Merit (USA, 1946)
	Grand Officer of the Legion d'Honneur (France, 1945)
	Croix de guerre (France, 1916)
	Croix de guerre (France, 1945)
	Order of the Defense of the Fatherland, 1st, 2nd and 3rd Classes (Romania, all in 1950)
	Medal "For the Liberation From the Fascist Yoke" (Romania, 1950)
	Order of Merit of the Republic of Hungary, 1st class (Hungarian Republic, 1947)
	Order of the Hungarian Merit, twice (1950 and 1965)
	Order of the Hungarian Freedom (1946)
	Star of the Republic of Indonesia, 2nd Class (Indonesia, 1963)
	The Grand Meritorious Military Order, 1st Class (Indonesia, 1962)
	Medal "20 Years of the Bulgarian People's Army" (1964)
	Order of the Resplendent Banner, 1st class (China, 1946)
	Medal of Sino-Soviet Friendship (China, 1956)
	Order of Military Merit, 1st Class (Morocco, 1965)
	Order of the National Flag, 1st class (North Korea, 1948)
	Medal for the Liberation of Korea (1948)
?	Commemorative Order "40th Anniversary Of Fatherland Liberation War Victory" (North Korea, 1985, posthumous)
	Medal "Brotherhood in Arms", 1st class (East Germany, 1966)
?	Cross of Independence (Mexico, 1964)

== Notes ==
Political offices
Preceded by Georgy Zhukov	Minister of Defence of Soviet Union; 1957–1967	Succeeded by Andrei Grechko
