= Lev Vladimirsky =

Soviet naval officer

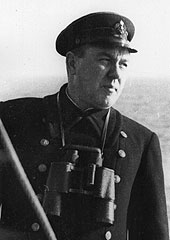
- Native name: Лев Анатольевич Владимирский
- Born: 27 September 1903; Guryev, Guryevsky Uyezd, Ural Oblast, Russian Empire
- Died: 7 September 1973 (aged 69) Moscow, Soviet Union
- Buried: Novodevichy Cemetery
- Allegiance: Soviet Union
- Branch: Soviet Navy
- Service years: 1921–1970
- Rank: Admiral
- Commands: Black Sea Fleet
- Conflicts: World War II
- Awards: Order of Lenin (2); Order of the Red Banner (3); Order of Suvorov 2nd class; Order of Ushakov 2nd class

Lev Anatolevich Vladimirsky (Russian: Лев Анатольевич Владимирский; 27 September 1903 – 7 September 1973), was a Soviet naval officer and an Admiral (1954).

He joined the Red Army as a volunteer during the Russian Civil War and fought against Islamic insurgents in Turkestan, later volunteering for service in the navy from 1921.

Vladimirsky graduated from the Naval Command School (1925) and studied at the special courses for commanding officers (1927), and the Military Academy of General Staff (1952).

Vladimirsky served aboard the Black and Azov seas ships as a navigator, watch chief, artilleryman, and senior deputy commander of a destroyer. From 1932, he commanded a destroyer escort, destroyer, destroyer leader, and from 1937, serving as chief of staff of the brigade of cruisers, and operations officer of a cruiser brigade. Early in 1938, he served on the French transport Bonifacio to supply arms and ammunition to the Spanish communists in the last stages of the Spanish Civil War, and later in 1938 Vladimirsky headed a detachment of hydrographic vessels, which accomplished a passage from the Baltic Sea to the Pacific Ocean.

After being the officer accepting delivery of the first Tashkent class destroyer, from June 1939, Vladimirsky was commanding a squadron of the Black Sea Fleet, which from the beginning of the Second World War participated in the fighting during the defense of Odesa and Sevastopol. In September 1941, he led an amphibious landing in the Grigorevki region. From May 1943, Vladimirsky commanded the Black Sea Fleet, leading naval forces in the Novorossiysk (1943) and Kerch-Eltigen (1943) landing operations. In May 1944, Vladimirsky was appointed squadron commander in the Baltic Fleet. He assumed command during participation in the Vyborg operation of 1944.

In 1947, Vladimirsky was appointed Admiral-Inspector of the Main Inspection of Armed Forces and later served as the Chief for the administration for naval educational institutions, Deputy Chief Inspector of Armed Forces for Military Naval Forces (VMF). From 1952, he was Chief of the Chief Directorate of Navy Military Training, and from April 1953, Chief for the administration of combat training VMF, becoming the Deputy Glavkom VMF on shipbuilding in March 1955. Between 1956 and 1959, Vladimirsky was the chairman of the naval scientific and technical committee.

From 1959, Vladimirsky predominantly worked in scientific and pedagogical roles, notably as Deputy Chief of the Naval Academy (1962–67), and the professor-consultant at the academy (1967–70). Starting on 15 October 1968, he headed several complex Soviet oceanographic expeditions; in 1968 - round-the-world expedition on the oceanographic vessel Polus (Pole).

Vladimirsky retired in 1970.

== Honours and awards ==
- Two Orders of Lenin
- Order of Red Banner, three times
- Order of Suvorov, 2nd class
- Order of Ushakov, 2nd class
- Jubilee Medal "XX Years of the Workers' and Peasants' Red Army"
- Medal "For the Defence of Odessa"
- Medal "For the Defence of Sevastopol"
- Medal "For the Victory over Germany in the Great Patriotic War 1941–1945"
- Jubilee Medal "Twenty Years of Victory in the Great Patriotic War 1941-1945"
- Jubilee Medal "30 Years of the Soviet Army and Navy"
- Jubilee Medal "40 Years of the Armed Forces of the USSR"
- Jubilee Medal "50 Years of the Armed Forces of the USSR"
- Medal of Sino-Soviet Friendship
