= Russian legion (disambiguation) =

Russian Legion was a battalion-size group of Russians from the Russian Expeditionary Force in France who continued fighting for the Allied cause in the First World War after the Bolshevik Revolution.

Russian legion or Russian Legion may also refer to:

- Freedom of Russia Legion, Ukrainian military unit formed of Russian defectors
- Russian Liberation Army, Nazi German military unit mostly composed of Soviet defectors in World War II
