= Russian destroyer Admiral Kharlamov =

Udaloy-class destroyer of the Russian Navy

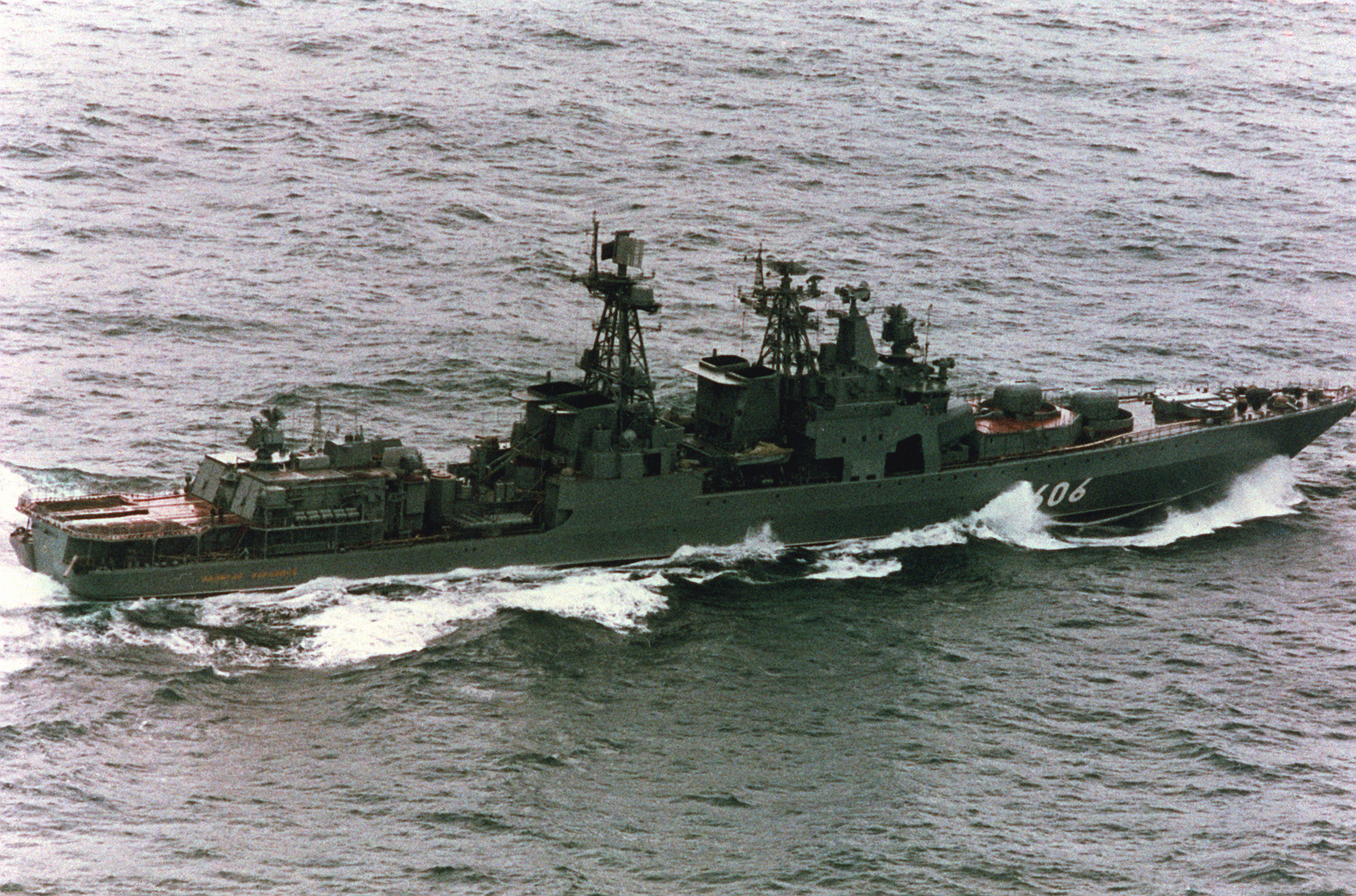
- Admiral Kharlamov in 1990

History

Russia
- Name: Admiral Kharlamov; (Адмирал Харламов)
- Namesake: Admiral Kharlamov
- Builder: Yantar Shipyard, Kaliningrad
- Laid down: 7 August 1986
- Launched: 29 June 1988
- Commissioned: 1 April 1990
- Decommissioned: 2 December 2020
- Home port: Severomorsk
- Identification: Pennant number: 606, 678
- Status: Decommissioned

General characteristics
- Class & type: Udaloy-class destroyer 7,570 tons full load
- Length: 163 m (534 ft 9 in)
- Beam: 19.3 m (63 ft 4 in)
- Draught: 6.2 m (20 ft 4 in)
- Propulsion: 2 shaft COGAG, 2 × D090 6.7 MW and 2 × DT59 16.7 gas turbines, 120,000 hp (89,000 kW)
- Speed: 35 knots (65 km/h; 40 mph)
- Range: 10,500 nmi (19,400 km; 12,100 mi) at 14 kn (26 km/h; 16 mph)
- Complement: 300
- Sensors & processing systems: Radar: MR-760MA Fregat-MA/Top Plate 3-D air search radar and MR-320M Topaz-V/Strut Pair air/surface search radar; Sonar: Horse Tail LF VDS sonar and Horse Jaw bow mounted LF sonar; Fire Control: 2 MR-360 Podkat/Cross Sword SA-N-9 SAM control, 2 3P37/Hot Flash SA-N-11 SAM control, Garpun-BAL SSM targeting
- Electronic warfare & decoys: Bell Squat jammer; Bell Shroud intercept; Bell Crown intercept; 2 × PK-2 decoy RL; 10 × PK-10 decoy RL in later ships
- Armament: 2 × 1 AK-100 100 mm naval guns; 8 (2 × 4) SS-N-14 'Silex' anti-submarine/anti-ship missiles; 64 (8 × 8) VLS cells for SA-N-9 'Gauntlet' surface-to-air missiles; 4 × 6 30 mm AK-630 CIWS; 2 × 1 21KM AA guns; 2 × 4 533 mm torpedo tubes for Type 53 or Type 65 torpedoes; 2 × 12 RBU-6000 anti-submarine rocket launchers
- Aircraft carried: 2 × Ka-27 series helicopters
- Aviation facilities: Helipad and hangar

Admiral Kharlamov was an Udaloy-class destroyer of the Russian Navy. It was named after Admiral Nikolay Kharlamov.

== Development and design ==
Project 1155 dates to the 1970s when it was concluded that it was too costly to build large-displacement, multi-role combatants. The concept of a specialized surface ship was developed by Soviet designers. They are 156 metres (511 ft 10 in) in length, have a 17.3 m (56 ft 9 in) beam and 6.5 m (21 ft 4 in) draught.

== Construction and career ==
Admiral Kharlamov was laid down on 7 August 1986, and launched on 29 June 1988 by Yantar Shipyard in Kaliningrad. She was commissioned on 1 April 1990.

For the first 10 years, the ship served mostly making calls at foreign ports. She went to Sweden, Norway and Canada.

Between 30 June–5 July 1993, she paid a visit to the Canadian port of Halifax and between 7–11 July to the American port of Boston. Between 8–11 July 1994 Admiral Kharlamov visited the Dutch port of Rotterdam and also Norway. In 1996 and 1997, she was considered the best ship in the Russian Navy for anti-submarine warfare.

After July 2001, having taken part in the search for the sunken submarine Kursk along with Admiral Chabanenko, she did not return to sea. She was placed in reserve in 2006.

As of the end of 2019, Admiral Kharlamov was at the Nerpa plant awaiting either repair and modernization or disposal. She was withdrawn from the fleet in 2020 (St. Andrew's flag was lowered on 2 December) and is preparing for disposal at Nerpa Shipyard.
