= Stepan Kucherov =

Stepan Grigorievich Kucherov
- Born: 26 August 1902; Olshanka, Saratov Governorate, Russian Empire
- Died: 30 March 1973 (aged 70); Moscow, Soviet Union
- Military career
- Allegiance: Soviet Union
- Branch: Soviet Navy
- Service years: 1922–1967
- Rank: Admiral
- Commands: White Sea Flotilla; Deputy Chief of the Naval Staff; Caspian Flotilla
- Conflicts: World War II
- Awards: Order of Lenin; Order of the Red Banner; Order of Nakhimov; Order of Ushakov First Class

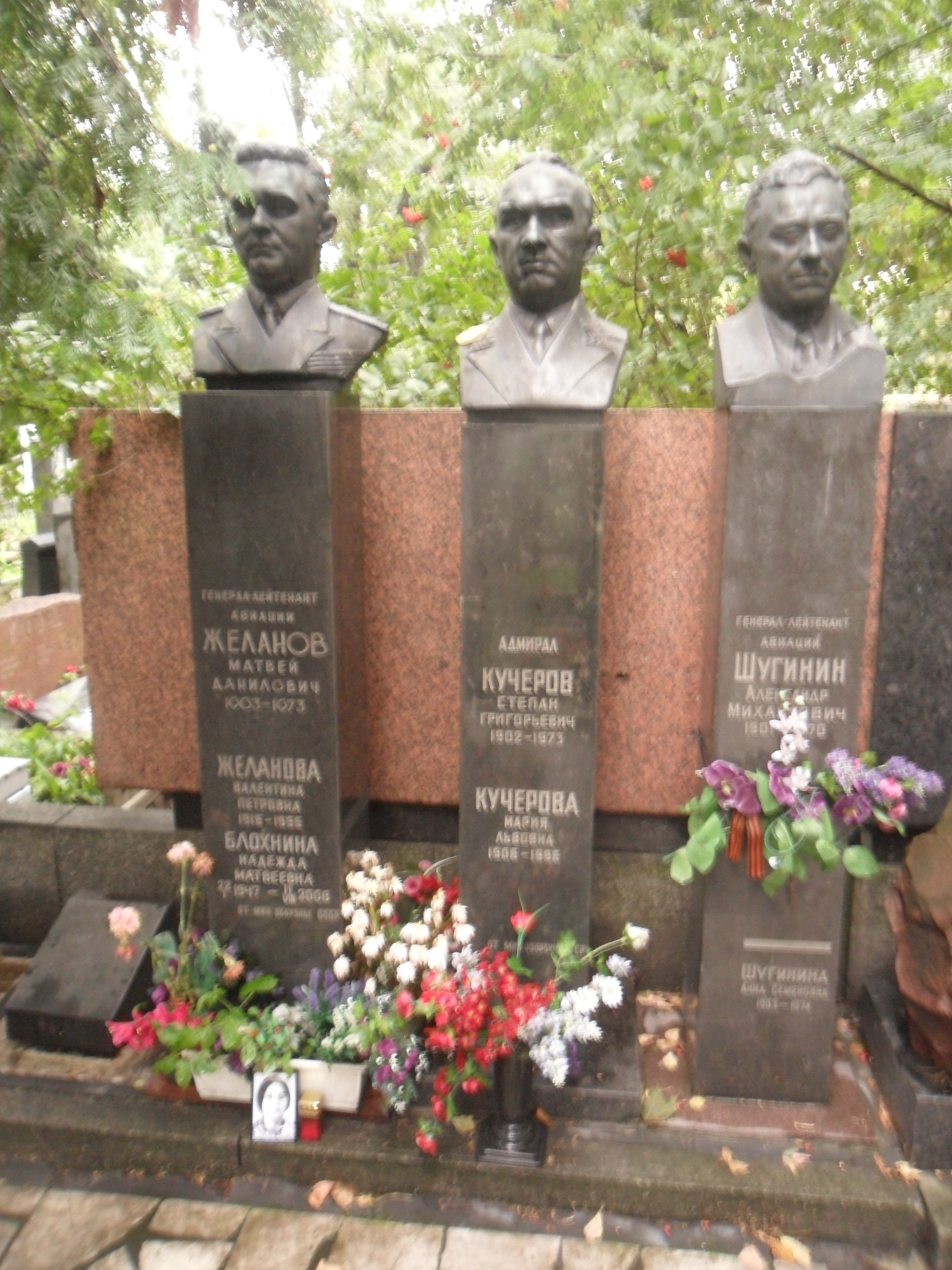
The grave of Generals Matvey Zhelanov (left), Vladimir Shuginin (middle), and Admiral Stepan Kucherov (right) at the Novodevichy Cemetery in Moscow.

Stepan Grigorievich Kucherov (Russian: Степан Григорьевич Кучеров) (26 August [O.S. 13 August] 1902 – 30 March 1973) was a Soviet naval officer.

== Biography ==
Kucherov was born in Olshanka in what is now the Arkadaksky District of Saratov Oblast. After joining the Soviet Navy in 1922, he advanced through the ranks and held various commands, including Chief of Staff of the Northern Fleet (August 1940), Commander of the White Sea Flotilla (February 1943), and Deputy Chief of Staff of the Soviet Navy (1944–45). In this capacity he participated in the conferences at Yalta and Potsdam. After the war he commanded the Caspian Flotilla and from 1950 took up a series of teaching and administrative positions at the Military Academy. He retired in 1967. Kucherov received several decorations, including two of the highest honors in the Soviet Navy: the Order of Nakhimov and the Order of Ushakov First Class.

== Legacy ==
An Udaloy II class destroyer named Admiral Kucherov was laid down in 1991 but scrapped in 1993.
