= Georgy Semyonovich Gotua =

Georgian military officer (1871–1936)

Georgy Gotua
- გიორგი გოთუა
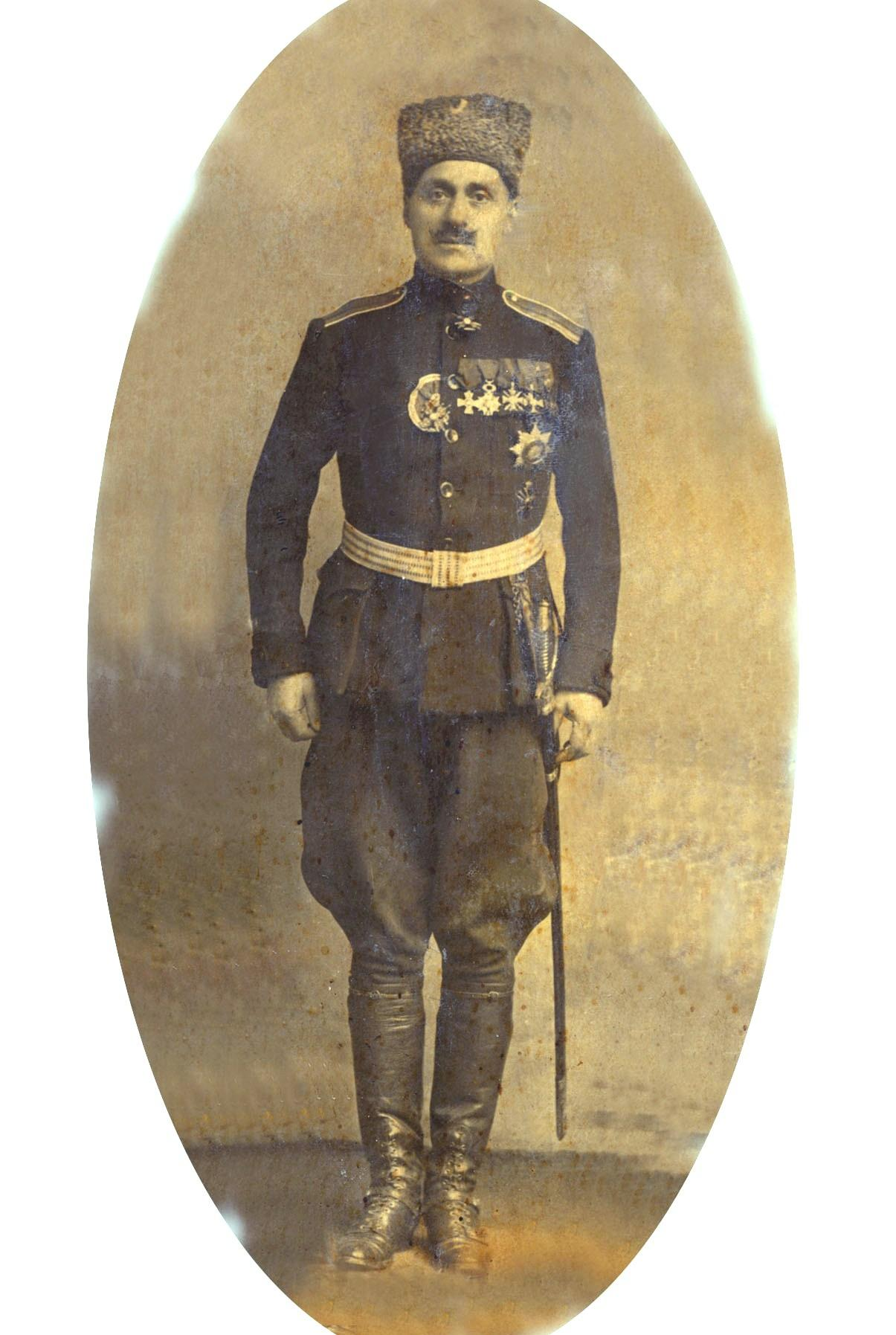
- Born: 13 January [O.S. 1 January] 1871; Guria
- Died: 13 January 1936 (aged 65); Belgrade, Kingdom of Yugoslavia
- Burial place: Belgrade New Cemetery
- Spouse: Elena
- Children: Georgy, Elena, Nina, Tamara, and Konstantin
- Military career
- Allegiance: Russian Empire; Russian State (1918–1920)
- Rank: Major General
- Conflicts: Russo-Japanese War; World War I
- Awards: Golden Weapon for Bravery; Cross of St. George; Order of Saint Vladimir; Order of Saint Stanislaus; Order of Saint Anna; Legion of Honour; Croix de Guerre; Bukhara Order of Rising Star

Georgy Semyonovich Gotua (Georgian: გიორგი გოთუა; 13 January [O.S. 1 January] 1871 – 13 January 1936) is the only high-ranking officer of the Imperial Russian Army who performed allied duty until the end of the World War I.

== Biography ==
Gotua was born on 13 January [O.S. 1 January] 1871, in Guria. He graduated from the Kutaisi progymnasium in 1889 and the Tiflis infantry cadet school in 1896.

Gotua served in the Russo-Japanese War. Later he served in various military units in Central Asia, and was awarded the Order of the Rising Star by the Emir of Bukhara.

With the outbreak of World War I, Captain Gotua, as part of the 8th Turkestan Rifle Regiment, was sent to the Russian North-Western Front of World War I. For participation in battles on the German-Russian front in 1915, was awarded orders and the Golden Weapon for Bravery (Saint George Sword).

As part of the Russian Expeditionary Force in France, In 1916 he fought in France and, with the rank of lieutenant colonel, commanded a battalion of the 2nd special regiment of the 1st brigade (later colonel of the Special Brigade in France). For the last battle in the Russian army (early April 1917), colonel Gotua was awarded the Cross of St. George. However, the Expeditionary Corps suffered heavy losses, was transferred to a camp for reconstruction, but liquidated in the summer.

Later George Gotua formed and then led a special Russian Legion. This unit, as part of the French Moroccan Division was the first of the allied armies to breach the Hindenburg Line.

From the beginning of 1919 Gotua was enlisted in the Volunteer Army. From November 3, 1919 - commander of the 7th reserve battalion of the Armed Forces of South Russia, Major-General. In 1921 he went into exile in Yugoslavia, living with the Don Cadet Corps (where his son was studying) in Bileća.

Gotua died on 13 January 1936. He was buried in the Belgrade New Cemetery, the resting place of many Russian emigrants. His son, Georgy Gotua, who died in 1971, was buried with his father. Due to the impossibility of family reunification, the remaining children (Elena, Nina, Tamara and Konstantin) lived with their mother Elena in Georgia.

== Awards and honors ==
- Golden Weapon for Bravery (18 March 1915)
- Order of Saint Vladimir, 4th class (19 December 1915)
- Order of Saint Stanislaus, 2nd class (2 September 1916)
- Order of Saint Anna, 2nd class (12 November 1916)
- Cross of St. George, 4th class (6 September 1917)
- Legion of Honour
- Croix de Guerre (1916)
- Bukhara Order of Rising Star
