= Order of Ushakov =

Russian award for outstanding naval leadership

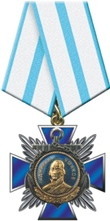
- Order of Ushakov (obverse)
- Type: Single grade Order
- Awarded for: Outstanding military leadership
- Presented by: Russian Federation; USSR
- Eligibility: Command grade naval officers
- Status: Active
- Established: March 3, 1944
- First award: May 16, 1944
- Ribbon of the Order of Ushakov

Precedence
- Next (higher): Order of Suvorov
- Next (lower): Order of Zhukov

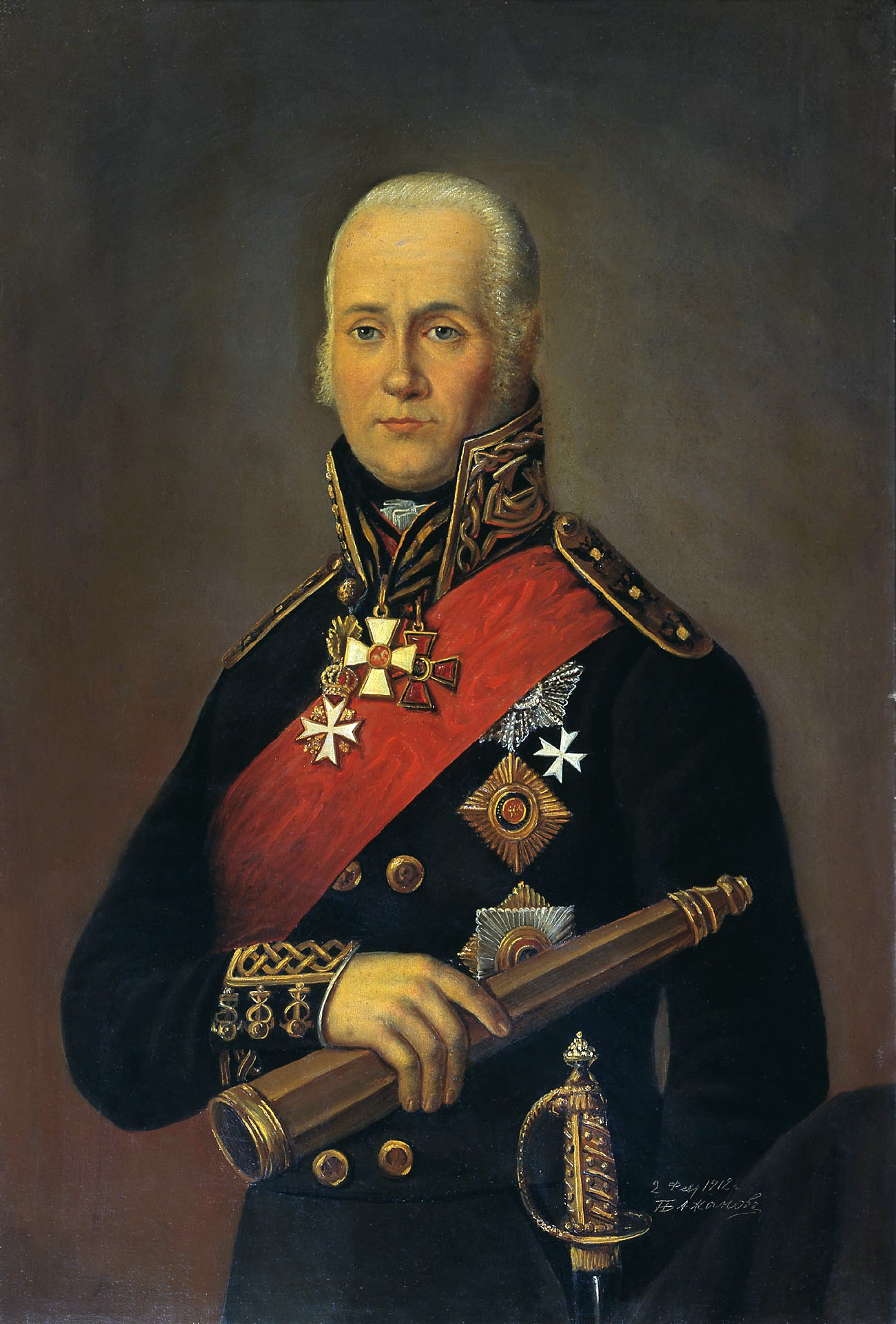
Admiral Fyodor Ushakov

The Order of Ushakov (Russian: орден Ушакова) is a military decoration of the Russian Federation named in honour of admiral Fyodor Ushakov (1744–1817) who never lost a battle and was proclaimed patron saint of the Russian Navy. It is bestowed to command grade naval officers for outstanding leadership. The order was established in two classes during World War II by decision of the Presidium of the Supreme Soviet of the USSR of March 3, 1944. The idea was given to Joseph Stalin by admiral Nikolai Gerasimovich Kuznetsov in the summer of 1943. Following the 1991 dissolution of the USSR, the Order of Ushakov was retained unchanged by Decision of the Supreme Soviet of the Russian Federation 2557-I of March 20, 1992 but it was not awarded in this form. The all encompassing Presidential Decree 1099 of September 7, 2010 that modernised and reorganised the entire Russian awards system away from its Soviet past amended the Order to its present form, a ribbon mounted single class Order.

== Soviet statute ==
From its establishment in 1944 until September 2010, the Order of Ushakov was awarded to officers of the Navy for outstanding achievements in the development, implementation and prosecution of naval operations resulting in victory over a numerically superior enemy.

The Order of Ushakov 1st class was awarded to naval officers for:

- excellent organization and conduct of operations against the enemy at sea or against its shore installations, the destruction of enemy naval forces or its coastal bases and fortifications in a sudden and decisive strike based on the full cooperation of all forces and resources of the fleet;
- well organized and successfully completed naval operation against enemy communications, which led to the destruction of a significant number of its warships and transports;
- initiative and determination in the management of combat operations resulting in the defeat of a numerically superior enemy, while retaining the combat capabilities of our forces;
- skilful and covert organisation and management of large-scale amphibious operations, which resulted in heavy enemy losses while retaining the combat capabilities of our forces.

The Order of Ushakov 2nd class was awarded to naval officers for:

- excellent leadership and successful combat actions at sea against a numerically superior enemy, which led to heavy enemy losses;
- skilful, swift and bold actions in raiding enemy bases and coastal facilities, resulting in the destruction of large enemy forces and equipment;
- successful and audacious actions against the enemy lines of communication that led to the destruction of heavily escorted ships and transports of a numerically superior enemy;
- excellent organisation and management of naval units taking part in a major amphibious operation, or for a well-organised and successful operations during a tactical landing;
- the successful execution of combat missions, skilful and efficient organization and coordination of all available forces and resources of the fleet in a battle that led to the destruction of a large enemy force;
- excellent leadership during an operation that led to a major military victory.

The Order of Ushakov 1st class was worn on the right side of the chest and when in the presence of other Orders of the USSR, located immediately after the Order of Suvorov 1st class. The Order 2nd class was also worn on the right side and located immediately after the Order of Suvorov 2nd class.

== Soviet and pre September 2010 award description ==
The Order of Ushakov 1st class was of multi part construction consisting of a five pointed star struck from platinum, an oxidised silver anchor and chain secured to the platinum star with four rivets, and a circular central medallion struck from gold superimposed on the anchor and bearing the relief image of admiral Ushakov, the background being covered in dark blue enamel, around the admiral's head, the inscription in gilt letters "ADMIRAL USHAKOV" (Russian: «АДМИРАЛ УШАКОВ»), below the admiral, laurel and oak branches bisected by the hammer and sickle. The central medallion was secured to the platinum star by two rivets and surrounded by a gilt rope. On the reverse, a threaded screw and a 33 mm in diameter nut arrangement for attachment to clothing. The award serial number was hand etched in the lower part. The Order 2nd class differed from the 1st class in the materials used in its construction, its five pointed star was made of gold while the anchor and central medallion were of silver and the oak and laurel branches were omitted.

The only noticeable difference between the Soviet and early Russian Federation variants was the abrogation of the hammer and sickle from the latter.

First Class 1944–1991	Second Class 1944–1991	First Class 1992–2010	Second Class 1992–2010
Ribbons

== Recipients of the Soviet award (partial list) ==
The Soviet Union's Order of Ushakov first class was awarded a total of 47 times, the second class 194 times.

The individuals listed below were awarded the Order of Ushakov 1st class:

- Admiral of the Fleet of the Soviet Union Nikolay Gerasimovich Kuznetsov
- Admiral Gordey Ivanovich Levchenko
- Admiral Filipp Sergeyevich Oktyabrskiy (Twice)
- Admiral Vladimir Filippovich Tributs (Twice)
- Admiral Nikolay Mikhaylovich Kharlamov
- Admiral Arseniy Grigoriyevich Golovko (Twice)
- Admiral of the Fleet of the Soviet Union Hovhannes Stepani Isakov (Twice)
- Admiral Stepan Grigorievich Kucherov
- Admiral of the Fleet of the Soviet Union Sergey Georgiyevich Gorshkov (Both classes)
- Admiral Lev Mikhailovich Galler (Twice)
- Admiral Sir Bertram Home Ramsay KCB, KBE, MVO
- Marshal of naval aviation Semyon Fyodorovich Zhavoronkov (Twice)
- Admiral Nikolai Ignatievich Vinogradov
- Admiral Vladimir Antonovich Alafuzov
- Admiral Pavel Sergeyevich Abankin
- Colonel-General Ivan Vasilyevich Rogov
- Admiral Vladimir Aleksandrovich Andreyev

The individuals listed below were awarded the Order of Ushakov 2nd class:

- Vice-Admiral Yuri Fedorovich Rall
- Rear Admiral Vladimir Konstantinovich Konovalov
- Captain 2nd grade Israel Ilyich Fisanovich
- Captain 1st grade Ivan Vasilyevich Travkin
- Admiral Lev Anatolevich Vladimirsky
- Rear Admiral Nikolai Alexandrovich Lunin
- Major General of naval aviation Nikolai Vasilievich Tchelnokov
- Major General of naval aviation Nikolai Alekseevich Musatov
- Captain of naval aviation Damian Vasil'evich Osyka
- Captain 1st grade Anton Iosifovich Gurin
- Captain 1st grade Samuel Nakhmanovich Bogorad
- Major General of naval aviation Konstantin Dmitrievich Denisov
- Lieutenant Colonel of naval aviation Andrei Ivanovich Barsky
- Captain 3rd grade Vasily Markovich Zhil'tchov
- Captain Lieutenant Ivan Sergeevich Ivanov
- Admiral Ivan Ivanovich Borzov

The Order of Ushakov was also bestowed to the following units and institutions:

- Submarine Brigade of the Northern Fleet
- 2nd Anti-Submarine Brigade of the Northern Fleet
- Torpedo Boat Brigade "Pechenga" of the Northern Fleet
- Submarine Brigade of the Baltic Fleet
- 9th Air Assault Division of the Baltic Fleet
- Minelaying Flotilla of the Black Sea Fleet
- Dnieper Flotilla
- 4th Amur River Flotilla
- Frunze Higher Naval School
- N.G. Kuznetsov Naval Academy

== Statute of the modern award ==
The Order of Ushakov is awarded to command grade officers of formations and divisions of the Navy for:

- skilful organization and conduct of operations during naval combat during which, despite the numerical superiority of the enemy, the objectives of the operation were carried out;
- skilful naval manoeuvres leading to the defeat of superior enemy naval forces;
- initiative and determination in choosing a place and time of application of the main attack which led to the defeat of the enemy enabling the preservation and combat readiness of forces (troops);
- the destruction of the enemy fleet or shore facilities;
- skilful organization causing a sudden and decisive blow to enemy forces based on interaction with other branches of the Armed Forces of the Russian Federation;
- skilful organization in repelling enemy attacks from the sea while retaining the fighting ability of formations and of forces (troops), of operational facilities on home territory, of the main ports of the fleet;
- success in combined naval (air / sea), amphibious operations, which resulted in achieving its goals.

The Order of Ushakov may also be awarded to military units and formations of the Navy for participation in successful naval operations. It may also be awarded to foreign citizens - soldiers of allied forces from among its senior officers involved alongside troops of the Russian Federation. for organizing and conducting successful joint operations of allied troops (forces).

The Russian Federation order of precedence dictates that the Order of Ushakov is to be worn on the left side of the chest, and in the presence of other orders of the Russian Federation, is to be located immediately after the Order of Suvorov.

== Description of the modern award ==
Badge of the Order of Ushakov

The Order of Ushakov is a 40 mm wide blue enamelled silver cross pattée, seven silver rays of increasing size protrude from the center between each cross arm. On the obverse, a convex central blue enamelled medallion superimposed over a ship's anchor, the arms and flukes, stock and shackle visible. On the medallion, the gilded bust of Admiral Fyodor Ushakov half turned to the left. Below the medallion, on the crown and arms of the anchor, crossed gilded branches of oak and laurel. On either side of the bust, following the medallion's circumference, the gilded relief inscription "ADMIRAL USHAKOV" (Russian: «АДМИРАЛ УШАКОВ»). The maximum distance between the tips of opposing silver rays is 45 mm. The plain reverse bears only a relief "N" and a line for the award serial number.

The badge of the Order is suspended by a ring through the award's suspension loop to a standard Russian pentagonal mount covered by an overlapping 24 mm wide white silk moiré ribbon with a 4 mm wide blue central stripe and two 2 mm blue edge stripes.

== Notable Recipients ==
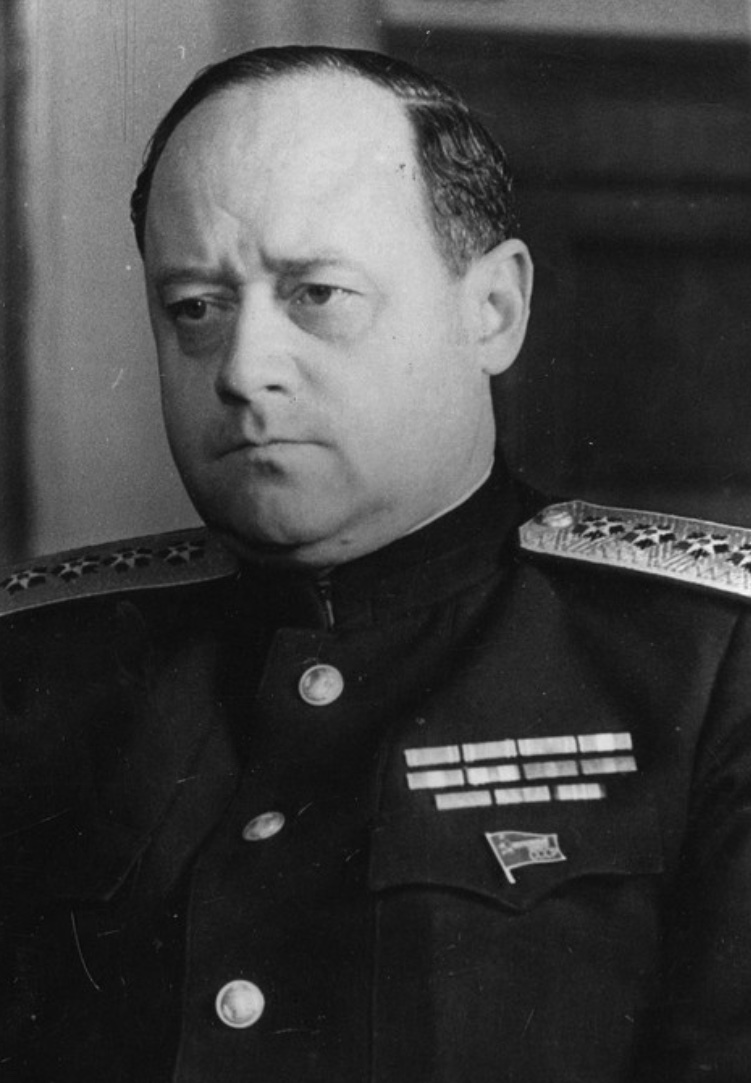
Admiral of the Fleet of the Soviet Union Ivan Isakov, recipient of two Orders of Usakov 1st class

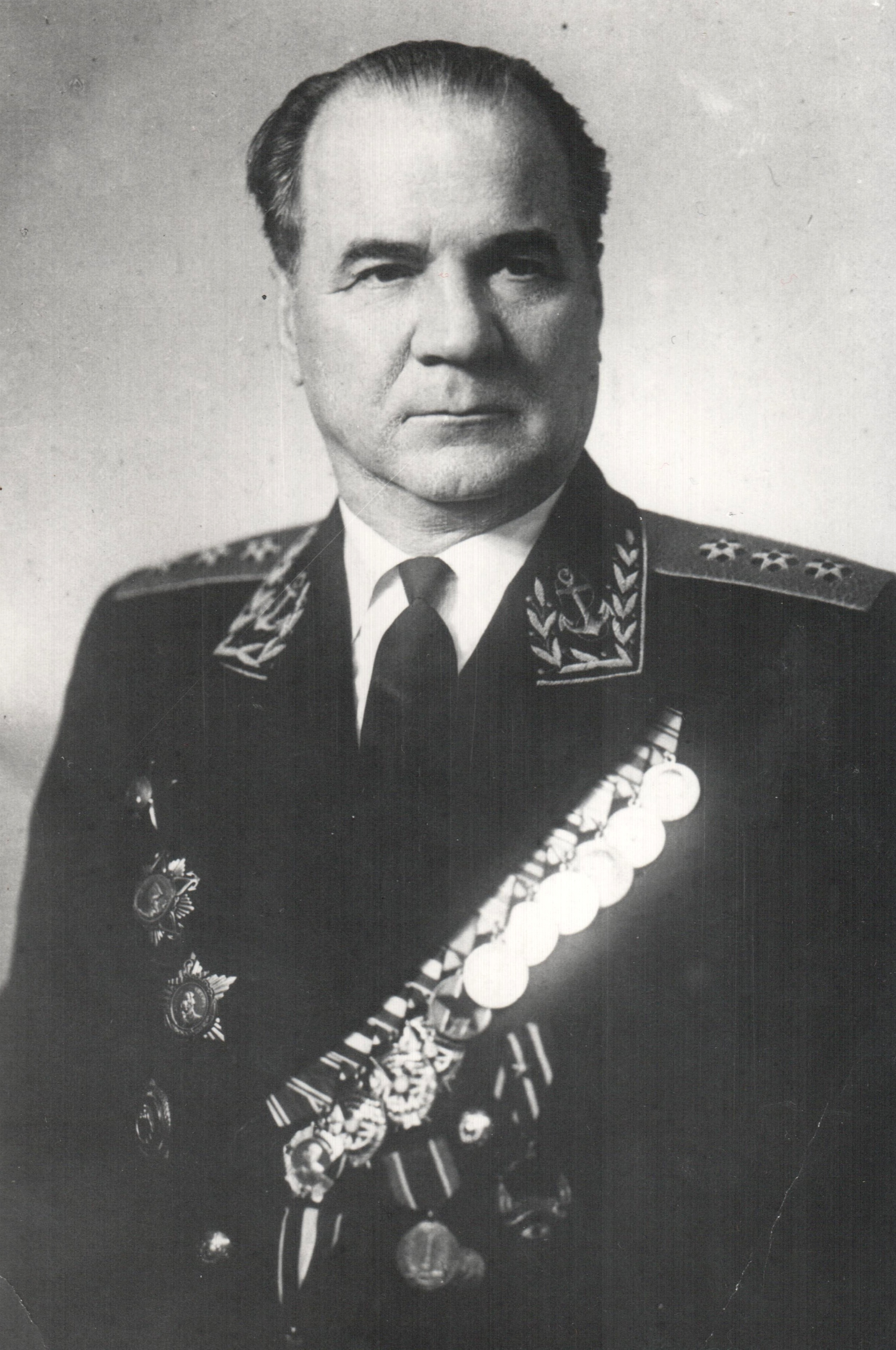
Admiral Nikolay Mikhaylovich Kharlamov, a recipient of the Order of Ushakov 1st class

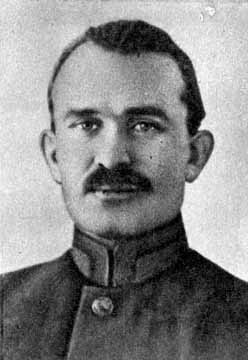
Admiral of the Fleet of the Soviet Union Sergey Gorshkov, a recipient of both classes of the Order of Ushakov

== See also ==
- Admiral Fyodor Ushakov
- List of orders, decorations, and medals of the Russian Federation
- Awards and decorations of the Soviet Union
- Ushakov Medal
- Soviet Navy
- Russian Navy
- Great Patriotic War
