= Ivan Travkin =

Soviet submariner (1908–1985)

Ivan Vasilyevich Travkin (Russian: Ива́н Васи́льевич Тра́вкин; September 11 [O.S. August 30] 1908, Naro-Fominsk, Russia – 14 June 1985, Moscow) was a Soviet submarine commander, Captain 1st Rank, Hero of the Soviet Union (20 April 1945).

He was commander of the submarines ShCh-303 (Щ-303) and K-52. After his discharge from the Navy, in 1956, he lived and worked in Moscow.

Ivan Vasilyevich Travkin is buried in the Kuntsevo Cemetery, Moscow.

== Awards ==
- Hero of the Soviet Union (awarded with the Gold Star medal; April 20, 1945, medal #5089)
- Three Orders of Lenin
- Two Orders of the Red Banner
- Order of Ushakov, 2nd class
- Order of the Patriotic War, 1st class
- Order of the Red Star
- Medal "For Battle Merit"
- Navy Cross (United States)
- campaign and jubilee medals
