= Medal of Sino-Soviet Friendship =

Chinese award

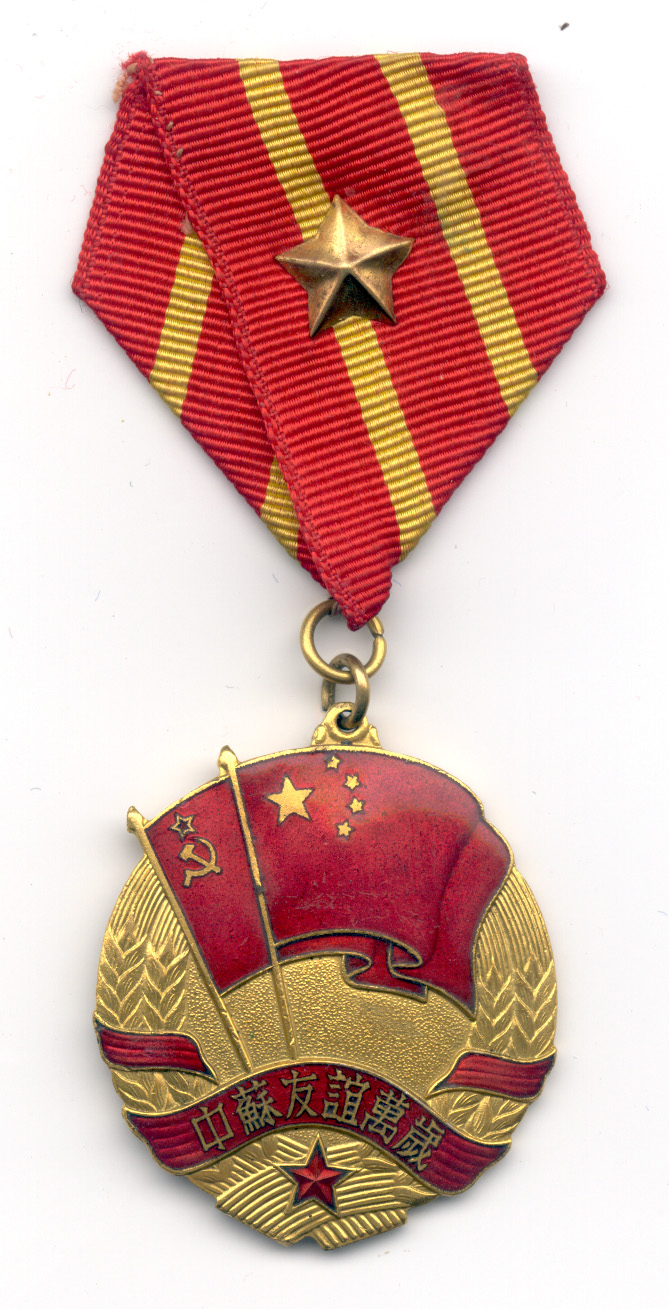
- Medal of Sino-Soviet Friendship
- Awarded for: Soviet military personnel and assistants who have contributed to the Sino-Soviet friendship.
- Presented by: China
- Eligibility: Specialists and military advisers of the USSR
- Status: No longer awarded
- Established: 1951
- First award: 1951
- Final award: 1959
- Ribbon bar of the Medal of Sino-Soviet Friendship

Medal of Sino-Soviet Friendship
- Simplified Chinese: 中蘇友誼萬歲獎章
Transcriptions
Standard Mandarin
- Hanyu Pinyin: Zhōng sū yǒuyì wànsuì jiǎngzhāng

The Medal of Sino-Soviet Friendship (Chinese: 中蘇友誼萬歲獎章) (Russian: Медаль «Китайско-советская дружба»), a.k.a. the Sino-Soviet Friendship Medal, was a medal awarded by the People's Republic of China.

== History ==
The medal was established in 1951 by the Central People's Government, in order to express thanks to Soviet Union for the early technical support and assistance provided following the founding of People's Republic of China in 1949. On February 14, 1950, China and the Soviet Union signed the Sino-Soviet Treaty of Friendship, Alliance and Mutual Assistance. On February 15, nearly 2,000 representatives held a celebration meeting, which was attended by 40 Soviet dignitaries, including Peter Vladimirov, the Consul General of the Soviet Union in Shanghai. Mayor of Shanghai Chen Yi delivered a speech on behalf of the people of Shanghai at the celebratory meeting in support of the treaty.

In March 1950, at the request of the Chinese government, the Soviet Union dispatched an air defense group to Shanghai to assist the Chinese People's Liberation Army in air defense of Shanghai from the Nationalist ROCAF air raids operating from bases in Taiwan. After October, the Soviet air defense group left Shanghai and returned to China in batches following the outbreak of the Korean War. During the Korean War, the medal was awarded to Soviet specialists and military advisors for the assistance provided to the People's Volunteer Army. At the same time, it was a commemorative medal for awarding various Soviet delegations visiting the PRC, and an anniversary award for presenting on the occasion of solemn events. On Sept 15, 1955, the Chinese government decreed that each departing Soviet military personnel be issued the medal. The recipient was awarded the medal and certificate by Premier Zhou Enlai or by Chairman Mao Zedong.

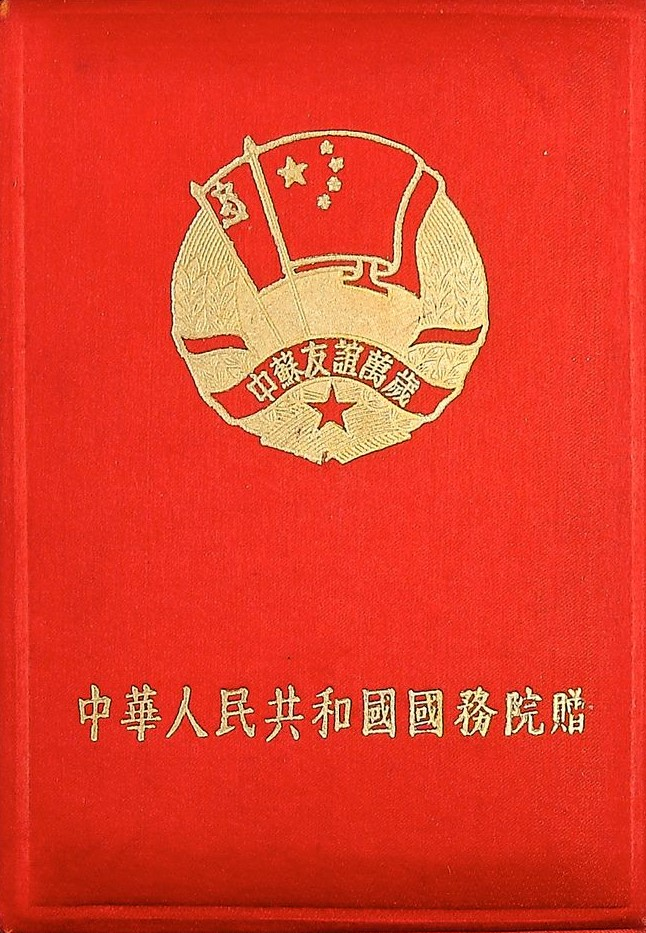
Certificate holder of the Medal of Sino-Soviet Friendship Medal

In late June 1956, at the invitation of the Chinese government, three warships of the Soviet Pacific Fleet led by the commander of the Pacific Fleet Valentin Chekurov visited Shanghai. This is the first friendly visit by a foreign naval fleet since the end of the Chinese Civil War and it was attended by more than 2,000 people. On June 25, on behalf of Mao Zedong, commander of the PLA Navy Xiao Jinguang, presented the Medal of Sino-Soviet Friendship to the personnel of the fleet, along with an awarding certificate printed with Mao Zedong's autograph to all officers above the rank of lieutenant within the Soviet fleet.

Following the start of Sino-Soviet split in 1956, the award was disestablished in the early 1960s. After the death of Mao Zedong and the beginning of the Chinese economic reforms undertaken by Deng Xiaoping, which saw the arrival of new foreign experts and advisers, the State Administration of Foreign Experts Affairs reinistated the award in 1991 with a new name, the Friendship Award. It is awarded to foreign dignitaries, advisors and experts who have made outstanding contributions to China's socialist modernization, and the promotion of exchange and cooperation between China and foreign countries.

== Appearance ==
The medal is round with a gold base. There are two overlapping flags of the People's Republic of China and Soviet Union. The medal is surrounded by two golden wheat ears and olive branches. The lower red ribbon is engraved "China-Soviet Friendship Long live" in six traditional Chinese characters.

The seal is rectangular in shape with a red background and a copper – colored five-pointed star in the middle with two yellow lines running through it.

== Notable recipients ==
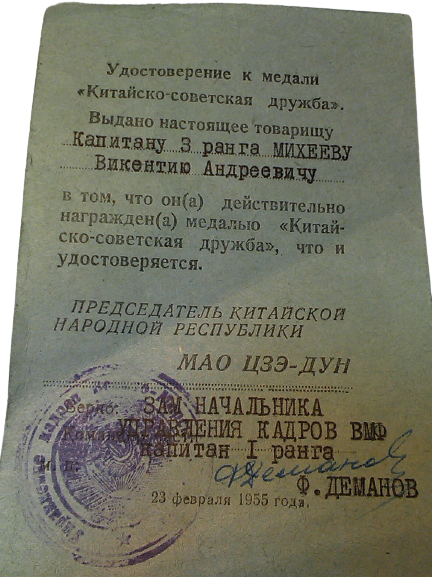
Certificate of awarding of the medal

- Marshal Sergey Akhromeyev
- Admiral Lev Vladimirsky
- Marshal Ivan Bagramyan
- Marshal Vasily Chuikov
- Marshal Rodion Malinovsky
- Marshal Konstantin Rokossovsky
- Marshal Aleksandr Vasilevsky
- Marshal Matvei Zakharov (twice)
- Marshal Georgy Zhukov (twice)
- Marshal of Aviation Ivan Kozhedub
