= Russian Legion =

- Active: 13 December 1917 – 11 November 1918
- Allegiance: Russian Republic
- Type: Expeditionary Force
- Size: 4 battalions
- Engagements: World War I

Commanders
- Notable commanders: Colonel Georgy Semyonovich Gotua

From Russia to the Western Front.

The Honorary Russian Legion (French: Légion d’Honneur Russe) was a battalion size group of Russians from the Russian Expeditionary Force in France who continued fighting for the Allied cause in the First World War after the Bolshevik Revolution.

== Russian Expeditionary Force ==
The Russian Expeditionary Force was a World War I military force sent to France by the Russian Empire. In 1915 the French requested that Russian troops be sent to fight alongside their own army on the Western Front. Initially they asked for 300,000 men, an absurdly high figure, probably based on their assumptions about Russia's 'unlimited' reserves. General Mikhail Alekseev, the Imperial Chief of Staff, was opposed to sending any, though Nicholas II finally agreed to send a unit of brigade strength. The First Russian Special Brigade finally landed at Marseille in April 1916. A Second Special Brigade was also sent to serve alongside other Allied formations on the Salonika front in northern Greece. In France, the First Brigade served with distinction until the outbreak of the Russian Revolution of 1917. A 3rd Brigade comprised serving soldiers plus reserve units was formed in Yekaterinburg and Chelyabinsk under the command of Fyodor Fyodorovich Palitzin left for France in August 1916. A 4th Brigade was formed and arrived on the Salonika front in November 1916. A 5th Brigade was ordered and never formed due to the outbreak of the Russian Revolution (1917).

== Mutiny ==
After the October Revolution and subsequent withdrawal of Russia from the Allies, the Russian troops were looked upon with distrust and relegated to labor companies and internment camps, primarily at Camp Militaire, near La Courtine. The camp was divided into the 1st and 3rd Brigades.

The Russian soldiers in 1st Brigade camp began questioning why they were fighting for the French at all and mutinied. The 3rd Brigade camp was still led by Russian officers (notably Georgy Semyonovich Gotua) and was used to help suppress the rebellious one. Finally the French, backed by a newly arrived Russian-manned 75mm field artillery regiment, shelled the rebellious camp, resulting in approximately 10 dead and 44 wounded, as well as an unknown number of dead and wounded shot by Gotua's camp. The survivors were at first sent to jail camps in North Africa and France, and after some months many were sent back to Russia, while a good number of the men integrated into French society.

== Russian Legion ==
The loyal men under Colonel Georgy Gotua demanded that they be allowed to fight and thus formed the Russian Legion.

Four battalions are formed:

- First Battalion - Colonel Gotua

13 officers, 490 men. Attached to the 1st Moroccan Division.

- Second Battalion - Colonel Ieske (Jeske) [lv] until May 5, 1918, then led by Colonel Kotovitch.

11 officers, 397 men. Was not sent to the front to fight.

- Third Battalion - Colonel Balbachevski

21 officers, 504 men. Ordered to go to the Macedonian front (Salonika) but after learning of the Treaty of Brest-Litovsk the men started questioning why they should fight so it was never used in battle.

- Fourth Battalion - Colonel Simonoff

6 officers, 234 men. Also attached to the Moroccan Division, fighting alongside the First Battalion.

It joined the French ^{1st} Moroccan Division on December 13, 1917. The combined units then took place in the fighting around Amiens in March 1918 (→ Operation Michael), with severe losses to the Moroccan Division and the Russian Legion. Captain Loupanoff of the Russian Legion was decorated with the Medal of the Legion of Honor by the commander of the Moroccan Division, General Douzan.

In May 1918 the Moroccan Division took part in the fierce fighting on the road from Soissons to Paris. The Russian Legion was sent in by Colonel Lagarde as badly needed reinforcements for the Moroccan Division. Losses during the fighting accounted for nearly 85% of the Russian Legion's forces.

In July the Legion was sent reinforcements made primarily of volunteers from old regiments of the Expeditionary Corps and was reformed into the 1st Brigade of the Moroccan Division. More reinforcements arrived in August to bring the total to 2 1/2 infantry companies as well as a mortar unit which turned the Brigade into a Regiment. The Regiment was then sent towards Laffaux. The Legion actively participated in the breakthrough of the Hindenburg line, taking the first and second lines with bayonet attacks, and the third line surrendered itself when the Russians began to approach with shouts of "Huzzah”. The Legion's losses amounted to 9 killed and 25 wounded.

Marshal Ferdinand Foch, Commander of the French Army, awarded the Russian Regiment with a special flag after their actions on September 12, where the Regiment managed to pierce the German defences, making its way through 3 lines of fortifications and capturing prisoners and materials, despite taking heavy losses. This attracted more volunteers, so that by November 1, 1918 the Regiment had 564 men. The battalion in turn was divided into a machine gun company and 3 infantry companies.

After the German withdrawal to the border the Moroccan Division, including the Russian Regiment, advanced upon Moyeuvre. The operation was halted by the signing of the armistice treaty on November 11. Near the end of 1918 the entire Russian Regiment was recalled and demobilized. Some Russians chose to remain in France, while others returned to revolutionary Russia. Among the latter was Rodion Malinovsky, the future Soviet Minister of Defence.

== See also ==
- Moroccan Division
  - 2nd Marching Regiment of the 1st Foreign Regiment
  - 2nd Marching Regiment of the 2nd Foreign Regiment
- Marching Regiment of the Foreign Legion
