= Order of Suvorov =

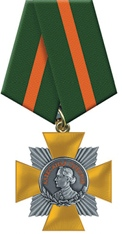
- Order of Suvorov (obverse)
- Type: Single class order
- Awarded for: Outstanding military leadership
- Presented by: Russian Federation; USSR
- Eligibility: Senior military officers
- Status: Active
- Established: July 29, 1942
- Ribbon of the Order of Suvorov, 1st class

Precedence
- Next (higher): Order of Alexander Nevsky
- Next (lower): Order of Ushakov

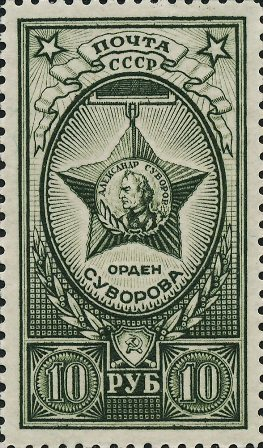
Order of Suvorov depicted on a 1943 postage stamp

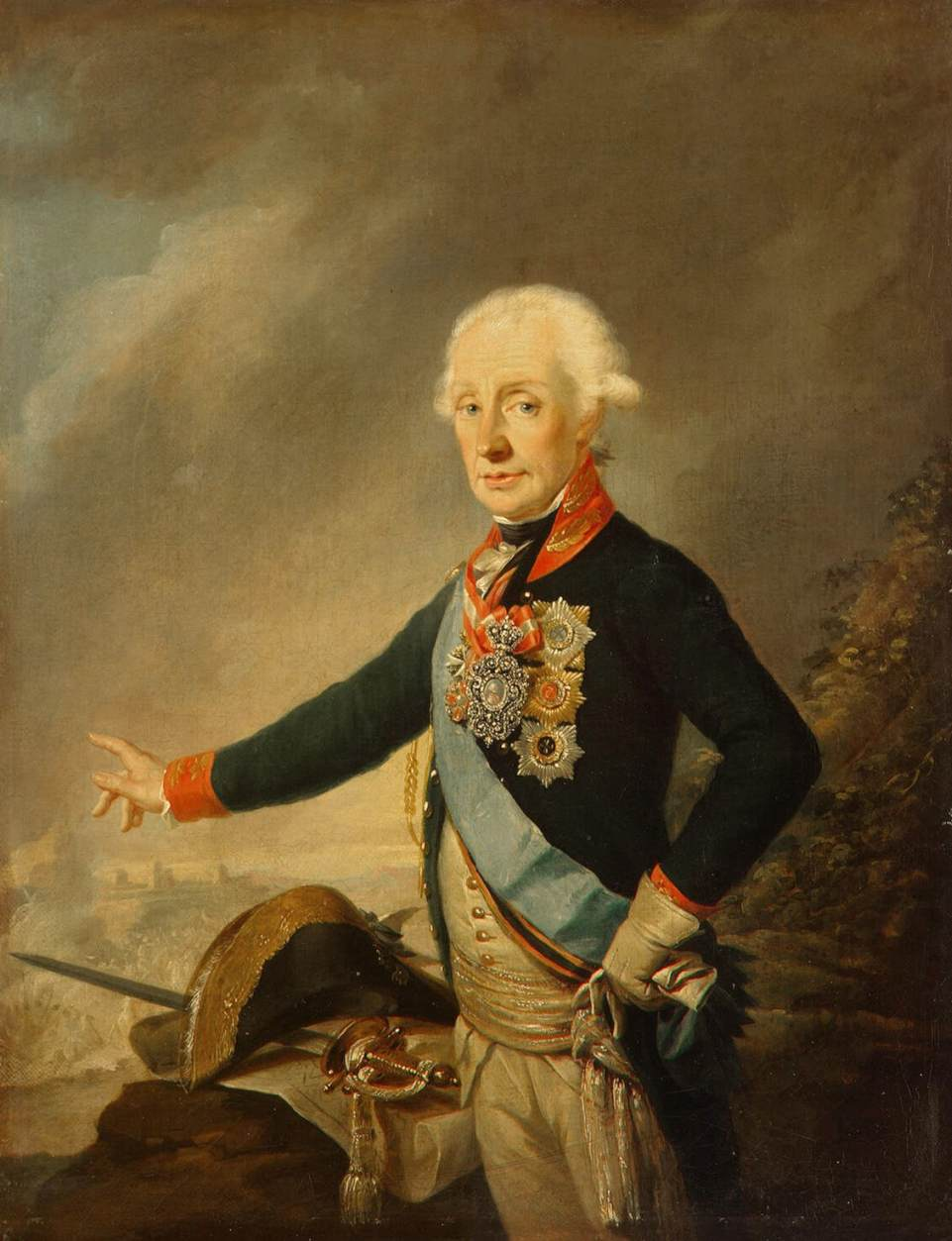
Generalissimo Alexander Suvorov

The Order of Suvorov (Russian: орден Суворова, romanised: orden Suvorova) is a military decoration of the Russian Federation named in honour of Russian Generalissimo Prince Alexander Suvorov (1729–1800).

== History ==
The Order of Suvorov was originally a Soviet award established on July 29, 1942 (during World War II) by decision of the Presidium of the Supreme Soviet of the USSR. It was created to reward senior army personnel for exceptional leadership in combat operations. The Order of Suvorov was divided into three classes: 1st class, 2nd class, and 3rd class. Georgi Zhukov became the first recipient of the Order of Suvorov 1st class on January 28, 1943.

The Order 1st class was awarded to army commanders for exceptional leadership of combat operations. The Order 2nd class was awarded to corps, division, and brigade commanders for a decisive victory over a numerically superior enemy. The Order 3rd class was awarded to regimental commanders, their chiefs of staff, and battalion and company commanders for outstanding leadership leading to a combat victory. Despite its official award criteria, both the first and second classes of the Order were sometimes awarded to defence industry executives, as well as to designers of various weapons and military equipment. Only a dozen non-Soviets have received the Order 1st class, including World War II military leaders United States Army Generals George C. Marshall and Dwight D. Eisenhower, British Army Field Marshal Alan Brooke, 1st Viscount Alanbrooke, Royal Air Force Bomber Command head Air Chief Marshal Arthur Harris, and Royal Navy Admiral Sir Robert Burnett.

Following the 1991 dissolution of the USSR, the Order of Suvorov was retained unchanged by Decision of the Supreme Soviet of the Russian Federation 2557-I of March 20, 1992 but it was not awarded in this form. The all encompassing Presidential Decree 1099 of September 7, 2010 that modernised and reorganised the entire Russian awards system away from its Soviet past changed the statute of the Order to a single-class medal.

In November 2015 all recipient formations in the Armed Forces of Ukraine were stripped of their Order of Suvorov honours as part of the removal of Soviet-era awards under decommunisation.

== Award statute ==
The Order of Suvorov is awarded in a single class to formation commanders, their deputies, heads of operational management, of operational departments, chiefs of the army and of special forces of the Armed Forces of the Russian Federation: for skilful organisation of the operations and management of groups of troops (forces), formations and military units, who managed, despite the stubborn resistance of the enemy, its numerical superiority, better technical equipment and a more favourable location in the theatre of operations to achieve the goals of the operation to keep key areas of its territory (or territory of allied countries), to create conditions for seizing the initiative and conduct further operations with offensive purposes; for skilful organisation and management of units of the Armed Forces of the Russian Federation during events of strategic deterrence, to ensure that no escalation, aggression (conflict) against the Russian Federation and (or) its allies occurs.

May also be awarded for conducting operations on land or in the air, during which, despite the numerical superiority of the enemy, the objectives of the operations were carried out while retaining the full operational capability of military units. May be awarded to foreign citizens – soldiers of allied forces from among the senior officers involved alongside the soldiers of the Russian Federation for organising and conducting a successful combined operation of allied troops (forces). The Order may be awarded posthumously.

== Award description ==
The Order of Suvorov is a 40 mm-wide (1.6 in) gold-plated cross pattée with silver rays protruding from the centre outwards between the arms of the cross to form a square. The distance from the tip of the silver rays to the tip of the opposite rays is 35 mm. The obverse centre has a circular convex medallion bearing the gilded bust of Alexander Suvorov, in profile, facing left. Just below the bust of Suvorov, on the medallion lower edge, crossed branches of oak and laurel. At the upper part of the medallion, following its circumference, the inscription in red-enamelled embossed letters "ALEXANDER SUVOROV" (in Russian: АЛЕКСАНДР СУВОРОВ). The reverse is bare except for the award serial number.

The Order is suspended by a ring through the award's suspension loop to a standard Russian pentagonal mount covered by a 24 mm-wide (0.94 in) green silk moiré ribbon with a 5 mm-wide (0.20 in) orange central stripe.

The Russian Federation order of precedence dictates that the Order of Suvorov is to be worn on the left side of the chest, and in the presence of other orders of the Russian Federation, is to be located immediately after the Order of Alexander Nevsky.

First Class	Second Class	Third Class
Ribbons (1942–2010)

== See also ==
- Awards and decorations of the Russian Federation
- Awards and decorations of the Soviet Union
- Field Marshal Count Alexander Suvorov
