= Jubilee Medal "40 Years of the Armed Forces of the USSR" =

Commemorative medal of the Soviet Union

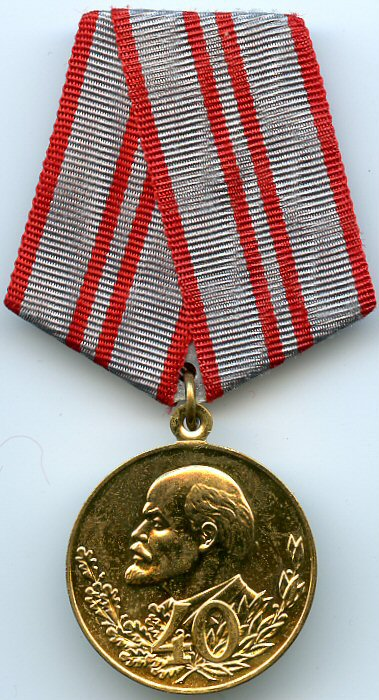
- Jubilee Medal "40 Years of the Armed Forces of the USSR" (obverse)
- Type: Jubilee medal
- Awarded for: Military service on February 22, 1958
- Presented by: USSR
- Eligibility: Citizens of the Soviet Union
- Status: No longer awarded
- Established: December 18, 1957

Highlights
- Total: 820,080
- Ribbon of the Jubilee Medal "40 Years of the Armed Forces of the USSR"

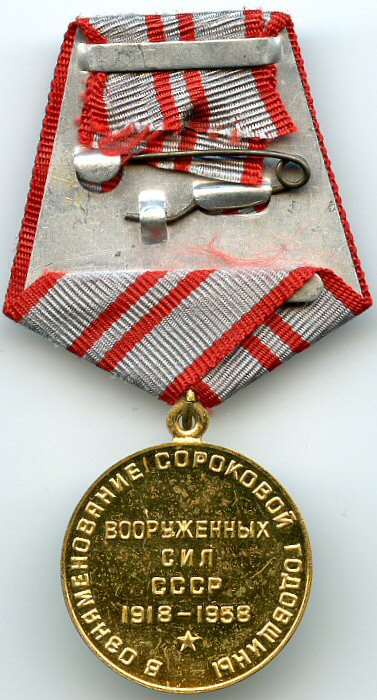
Reverse of the Jubilee Medal "40 Years of the Armed Forces of the USSR"

The Jubilee Medal "40 Years of the Armed Forces of the USSR" (Russian: Юбилейная медаль «40 лет Вооружённых Сил СССР») was a state military commemorative medal of the Soviet Union established on December 18, 1957 by decree of the Presidium of the Supreme Soviet of the USSR to denote the fortieth anniversary of the creation of the Soviet Armed Forces. Its statute was later amended by decree of the Presidium of the Supreme Soviet of the USSR of July 18, 1980.

== Medal statute ==
The Jubilee Medal "40 Years of the Armed Forces of the USSR" was awarded to marshals, generals, admirals, officers and sergeants, petty officers, soldiers and sailors who were members of the Armed Forces of the USSR, of the troops of the Ministry of Internal Affairs or of the Ministry for State Security on 23 February 1958.

The medal was awarded on behalf of the Presidium of the Supreme Soviet of the USSR by commanders of military units, agencies and institutions.

The Jubilee Medal "40 Years of the Armed Forces of the USSR" was worn on the left side of the chest and when in the presence of other medals of the USSR, it was located immediately after the Jubilee Medal "30 Years of the Soviet Army and Navy". If worn in the presence or Orders or medals of the Russian Federation, the latter have precedence.

== Medal description ==
The Jubilee Medal "40 Years of the Armed Forces of the USSR" was a 32mm in diameter circular brass medal. On the obverse, the left profile bust of Lenin over an oak branch going halfway up the left circumference of the medal, and a laurel branch going halfway up the right circumference of the medal; at the point where the two branches intertwine, in relief, the prominent number "40". On the reverse, the circular relief inscription along the entire medal's circumference "TO COMMEMORATE THE FORTIETH ANNIVERSARY" (Russian: «В ОЗНАМЕНОВАНИЕ СОРОКОВОЙ ГОДОВЩИНЫ»), in the center, the relief inscription in three rows "ARMED FORCES USSR" (Russian: «ВООРУЖЕННЫХ СИЛ СССР»), below the inscription the dates "1918–1958"; below the dates, a small relief five pointed star.

The Jubilee Medal "40 Years of the Armed Forces of the USSR" was secured by a ring through the medal suspension loop to a standard Soviet pentagonal mount covered by a 24mm wide silk moiré grey ribbon with a 2mm red edge stripe on each side and two central 2mm red stripes separated by 2mm.

== Recipients (partial list) ==
All individuals listed below are recipients of the Jubilee Medal "40 Years of the Armed Forces of the USSR".

- Colonel Yuri Alekseyevich Gagarin
- Captain Vasily Grigoryevich Zaytsev
- Marshal of the Soviet Union and Defence Minister Kliment Yefremovich Voroshilov
- Army General Sagadat Nurmagambetov
- Army General Mikhail Malinin
- Army General Sergei Shtemenko
- Captain 1st grade Ivan Travkin
- Lieutenant General Vasily Badanov
- Colonel General Leonid Sandalov
- Marshal of the Soviet Union Aleksandr Vasilevsky
- Admiral Gordey Ivanovich Levchenko
- Admiral of the Fleet Sergey Georgiyevich Gorshkov
- Rear Admiral Vladimir Konstantinovich Konovalov
- Admiral Arseniy Grigoriyevich Golovko
- Marshal of Aviation Alexander Ivanovich Pokryshkin
- Marshal of the Soviet Union Ivan Stepanovich Konev
- Marshal of the Soviet Union Kirill Afanasievich Meretskov
- Marshal of the Soviet Union Pavel Fyodorovich Batitsky
- Senior Lieutenant Anna Alexandrovna Timofeyeva-Yegorova
- Marshal of Armoured Troops Mikhail Efimovich Katukov

== See also ==
- Red Army
- Awards and decorations of the Soviet Union
