= Semyon Ivanov =

Soviet general

- Семён Павлович Иванов
- Army General Ivanov
- Born: 13 September 1907; Village Porecheno, Porechsky Uyezd, Smolensk Governorate, Russian Empire
- Died: 26 September 1993 (aged 86); Moscow, Russia
- Burial place: Novodevichy Cemetery
- Relatives: General Fedor Ivanov, General Piotr Ivanov (brothers)
- Military career
- Allegiance: Soviet Union (1926–1991)
- Service years: 1926–1992
- Rank: Army General
- Conflicts: World War II; Winter War; Eastern Front; Soviet–Japanese War; Operation Anadyr; Cuban Missile Crisis
- Awards: Hero of the Soviet Union; Order of Lenin (3)

Semyon Pavlovich Ivanov (Russian: Семён Павлович Иванов; 13 September 1907 – 26 September 1993) was a Soviet general. He was awarded with the Hero of the Soviet Union in 1945.

== Biography ==
=== Early life ===
Ivanov was born to a peasants' family. He began working in railroad maintenance at the age of twelve, while continuing to study during his spare time. He volunteered for the Red Army in 1926 and was sent to the 1st Infantry School in Moscow. After he graduated in 1929, he was given command of a platoon in the 16th Infantry Division. He joined the All-Union Communist Party (Bolsheviks) in the same year.

In 1936, Ivanov was sent to the Frunze Military Academy. Three years later, when he completed his studies, he was assigned to the Ural Military District as an assistant to the chief of operations. During the Winter War, he served as the chief of staff in the 1st Infantry Corps of the 8th Army.

=== World War II ===
Shortly after the beginning of the German-Soviet War on 22 June 1941, Colonel Ivanov was appointed operations chief of the 13th Army and took part in the Battle of Białystok–Minsk. In December, he was made chief of staff in the Southwestern Front's 38th Army. In July 1942, he was given the same office in the 1st Tank Army, and later in the 1st Guards Army. He became a major general and the Southwestern Front's chief of operations on 14 October, and participated in the Battle of Stalingrad.

In December, he was promoted to the front's chief of staff. On 19 January 1943, he was promoted to lieutenant general. When the Southwestern Front was reformed as the Voronezh Front, Ivanov retained his position under General Nikolai Vatutin and took part in the Battle of Kursk. When the 1st Ukrainian Front was created from the Voronezh's forces, he remained as its chief of staff.

On 11 November 1943, Ivanov was relieved from his post after making two contradictory reports to Moscow on the military situation in Fastiv Raion, without noticing that he was submitting data on the same region on both occasions. He was removed from the front and made chief of staff on the Transcaucasian Front. In October 1944, he was assigned in the same capacity to the 3rd Ukrainian Front, which was engaged in fighting near Budapest. He remained in this post until the end of the war with Germany, and was promoted to colonel general on 19 April 1945. Later, he took part in the Moscow Victory Parade of 1945.

In late June, Ivanov was transferred to the Far East Command, where he served as Marshal Aleksandr Vasilevsky's chief of staff during the Soviet–Japanese War. For his role in planning the operation, he was awarded the title Hero of the Soviet Union on 8 September 1945.

=== Post-war years ===
Ivanov served as chief of staff in a variety of Soviet formations: the Belorussian Military District (March 1946 – November 1948), the Group of Soviet Forces in Germany (November 1948 – June 1952), the Odesa Military District (1952–1953), the Moscow Military District (1953 – April 1956) and the Kiev Military District (April 1956 – September 1959).

In September 1959, Ivanov became the chief of the Soviet Army's Main Operations Directorate and a deputy to the Army's chief of general staff, Marshal Vasily Sokolovsky. In that role, he was involved in Operation Anadyr and the Cuban Missile Crisis. During the latter, he stayed in the Kremlin and assisted the Soviet leader, Nikita Khrushchev.

In 1963, when Colonel Oleg Penkovsky was arrested, Ivanov committed negligence in his work; Khrushchev wrote in his memoirs that he did not recall the exact deed, but that it might have ended in a security risk. Ivanov was removed from office and sent to command the remote Siberian Military District, where he remained until 1968.

On 19 February 1968, Ivanov was promoted to army general, and in May, he became commander of the Voroshilov Academy. This was his last post in the army. He retired from the Armed Forces in February 1973, and served as an inspector in the Ministry of Defence until 1992.

== Honours and awards ==
- "Gold Star" Hero of the Soviet Union № 7775
- Three Orders of Lenin (19 January 1943, 9 August 1945, 28 August 1987)
- Order of the October Revolution (30 August 1977)
- Order of the Red Banner, six times (1940, 27 March 1943, ..., 22 February 1968)
- Order of Suvorov, 1st class (4 April 1945)
- Order of Kutuzov, 1st class (29 June 1945)
- Order of the Patriotic War, 1st class (11 March 1985)
- Order of the Red Banner of Labour (30 August 1967)
- Order of the Red Star (30 April 1975)
- Order "For Service to the Homeland in the Armed Forces of the USSR", 3rd class
- Medal "For the Defence of Stalingrad"
- Medal "For the Victory over Japan"
- Medal "For the Capture of Budapest"
- Medal "For the Capture of Vienna"
- Medal "For the Victory over Germany in the Great Patriotic War 1941–1945"
- Medal "For Strengthening of Brotherhood in Arms"
- Medal "Veteran of the Armed Forces of the USSR"
- Medal "For the Liberation of Belgrade"
- Jubilee Medal "In Commemoration of the 100th Anniversary of the Birth of Vladimir Ilyich Lenin"
- Jubilee Medal "Twenty Years of Victory in the Great Patriotic War 1941–1945"
- Jubilee Medal "Thirty Years of Victory in the Great Patriotic War 1941–1945"
- Medal "For the Development of Virgin Lands"
- Jubilee Medal "30 Years of the Soviet Army and Navy"
- Jubilee Medal "40 Years of the Armed Forces of the USSR"
- Jubilee Medal "50 Years of the Armed Forces of the USSR"
- Jubilee Medal "60 Years of the Armed Forces of the USSR"
