= Ios Teper =

Soviet war veteran

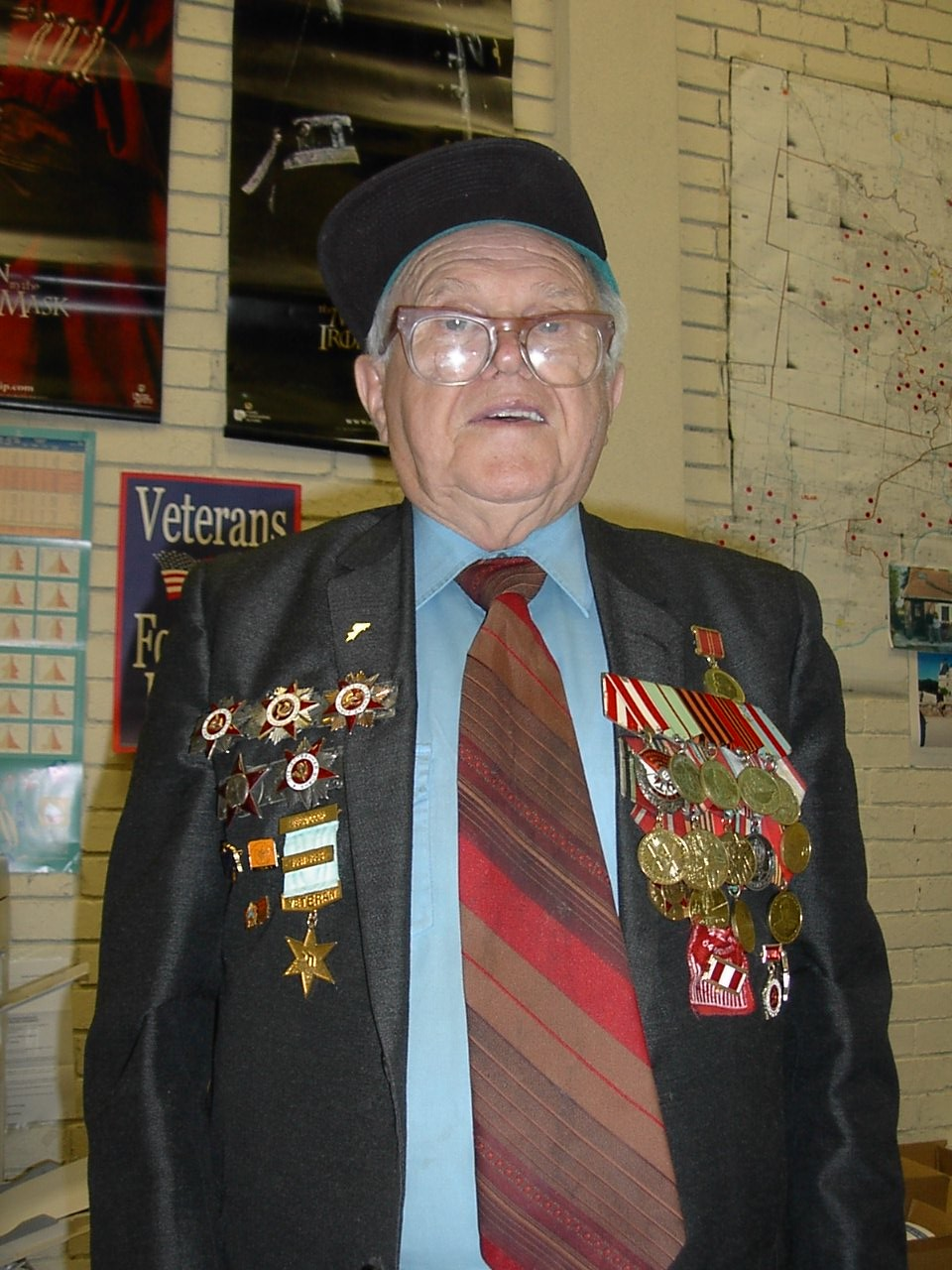
Ios Teper displays his medals, April 2005

Iosif Zeusovich "Ios" Teper (Yiddish: יאָסיף זעוסאָוויטש "יאָס" טעפּער, Ukrainian: Йосип Зеусович "Йос" Тепер, Russian: Иосиф Зеусович "Иос" Тепер; 12 July 1915 – August 2013) was a highly decorated Soviet war veteran born in Odesa, Ukraine, which was then part of the Russian Empire. He worked on a collective farm until the German invasion of the Soviet Union in June 1941, when he joined the Red Army. He served until June 1947.

Teper started the war as a platoon commander and finished it in the Divisional Artillery Intelligence group as a Captain. Because of his short stature, Teper was employed as a forward observer for the artillery, at great personal risk, and was wounded three times. At one time he stood in freezing water for three days while watching the German lines before a Soviet advance. He fought at the Battle of Stalingrad, then took part in the battles for Ukraine and Belarus before advancing into Poland in the army of Marshal of the Soviet Union Konstantin Rokossovsky.

After the fall of Warsaw he took part in the advance from the Vistula to the Oder, where he took part in the capture of Frankfurt-on-Oder, and then in the fierce fighting that led to the fall of Berlin in April 1945. He engaged in hand-to-hand fighting in the suburbs of Berlin, and was present at the capture of the Reichstag. After the fall of Berlin Teper's unit advanced to the west, and met up with American forces on 1 May.

Teper was awarded the Order of the Red Banner, the second-highest Soviet war decoration, for his conduct during the Battle of Berlin. He also held the 1st class Order of the Patriotic War, the Order of the Red Star, medals for the Defence of Stalingrad, the Liberation of Warsaw, the Capture of Berlin and the Zhukov Medal. He also held medals marking the 20th, 40th and 50th anniversaries of the Soviet victory, and marking the 50th, 60th and 70th anniversaries of the founding of the Red Army. He also held an Israeli medal given to Jewish veterans of the Red Army.

After the war Teper spent two years on occupation duties in eastern Germany, and at one time administered the town of Erfurt. He always felt, however, that antisemitic prejudice limited his ability to receive promotions. He was then demobilised and returned home to Odesa, where he held positions in the collective farm administration until his retirement. After the fall of the Soviet Union, disillusioned with increasing antisemitism in Ukraine, he migrated with his family to Melbourne, Australia, where he lived until his death. He was Vice-President of the Victorian Association of Veterans of World War II from the Ex-Soviet Union. He remained active in working for Jewish veterans of the Red Army in Australia well into his 90s. He died in a Melbourne nursing home in August 2013.
