= Ministry of Aviation Industry (Soviet Union) =

Soviet government ministry

Ministry of Aviation Industry of the USSR
- Russian: Министерство авиационной промышленности СССР; Russian: МАП СССР

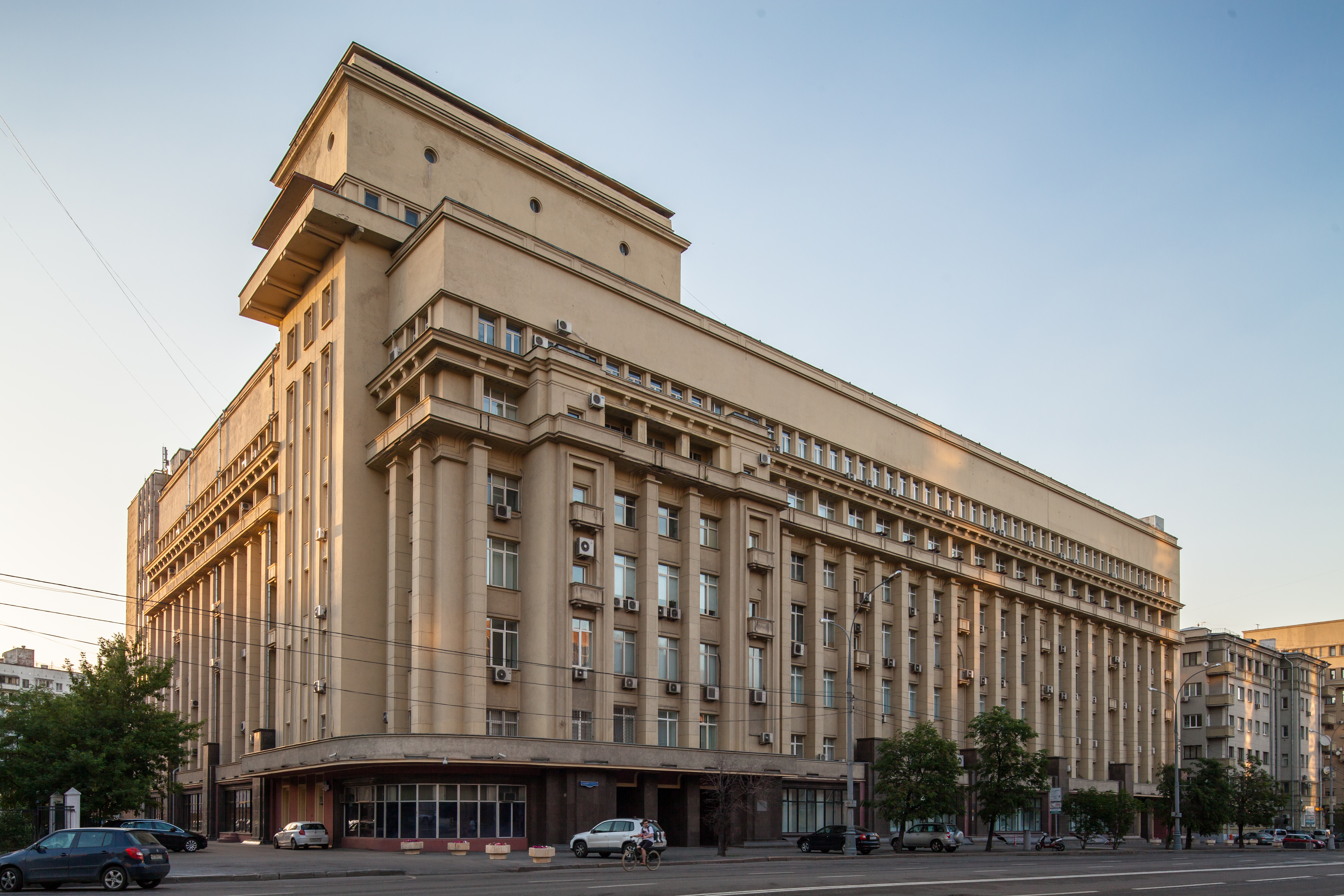
- Ministry headquarters in Moscow (architect D. F. Fridman)

Ministry overview
- Formed: March 15, 1946
- Jurisdiction: Government of the Soviet Union
- Headquarters: buildings 16 and 22 at Ulansky Lane, Moscow, USSR
- Ministers responsible: Mikhail Kaganovich; Aleksey Shakhurin; Mikhail Khrunichev; Pjotr Dementyev; Vasily Kazakov; Ivan Silayev; Apollon Systsov

The Ministry of Aviation Industry of the USSR (Russian: Министерство авиационной промышленности СССР) oversaw production of the aviation industry in the Soviet Union. Before 1946, it was known as the People's Commissariat of Aviation Industry of the USSR (Народный комиссариат авиационной промышленности CCCP – Наркомавиапром).

Its headquarters was located in Moscow, at the Ulansky Lane (Russian: Уланский переулок) in two buildings (No. 16 and 22; architect D. F. Fridman) built in 1936 for the headquarters of the Metrostroy (Russian: Мосметрострой) company. Since 1939, the headquarters of the People's Commissariat of Aviation Industry (Russian: Народный комиссариат авиационной промышленности (НКАП)) have been located here.

== History ==
A January 11, 1939, decree of the Presidium of the Supreme Soviet of the USSR created the People's Commissariat of Aviation Industry of the USSR from the 1st Main Department (aircraft) of the People's Commissariat of Defence Industry of the USSR.

According to Decree No. 4C of the Council of People's Commissars of 21 January 1939, the NCAP took over the activities of Main Departments No. 1, 5, 10 and 18 of the former People's Commissariat of Defence Industry to regulate production of aircraft, aircraft engines and equipment, along with related businesses, as well as production plants No. 18, 20, 30, 31, trust Orgoboronprom (Оргоборонпром), trust Ostekhupravlenie (Остехуправление) and experimental design bureaus No. 1, 5, 10.

NCAP oversaw several educational aviation institutes in Moscow, Kazan, Kharkov, and Rybinsk, including the Kuibyshev Institute of Engineering and Construction in Novosibirsk, the Moscow Department of Lenpromakademia, and the Institute of Training of Engineers and Aviation Management Personnel, which were supported by 15 technical schools covering aviation engineering, radio and electric technologies (in Gorky and Voronezh), and mechanical engineering (in Vladimir), plus 2 evening departments (Рабочий факультет) in Moscow and Perm. At a number of production plants, there were so-called "plant-schools" (in 99 locations).

The NCAP aimed to accelerate "the reconstruction and building aircraft factories" and to achieve a more than 50% increase in the production capacity of aircraft factories by the end of 1941 in comparison to 1939 with construction of nine new aircraft manufacturing plants while reconstructing the existing nine.

In March 1946 the Commissariat was transformed into the Ministry of Aviation Industry of the USSR (Министерство авиационной промышленности СССР).

== List of ministers ==
The following people served as People's Commissars for, or Ministers of, Aviation Industry:

- Mikhail Kaganovich (11.01.1939 – 10.01.1940)
- Aleksey Shakhurin (10.01.1940 – 15.03.1946)
- Mikhail Khrunichev (19.03.1946 – 15.03.1953)
- Pyotr Dementyev (24.08.1953 – 14.12.1957; 02.10.1965 – 14.05.1977)
- Vasily Kazakov (03.06.1977 – 17.02.1981)
- Ivan Silayev (21.2.1981 – 01.11.1985)
- Apollon Systsov (01.11.1985 – 24.08.1991)
