= Medal "For the Liberation of Warsaw" =

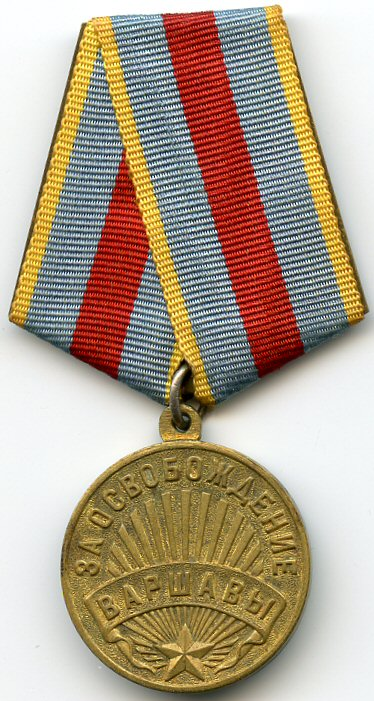
- Medal "For the Liberation of Warsaw" (obverse)
- Type: Campaign medal
- Awarded for: Participation in the liberation of Warsaw
- Presented by: USSR
- Eligibility: Citizens of the Soviet Union
- Status: No longer awarded
- Established: June 9, 1945

Highlights
- Total: 701,700
- Ribbon of the Medal "For the Liberation of Warsaw"

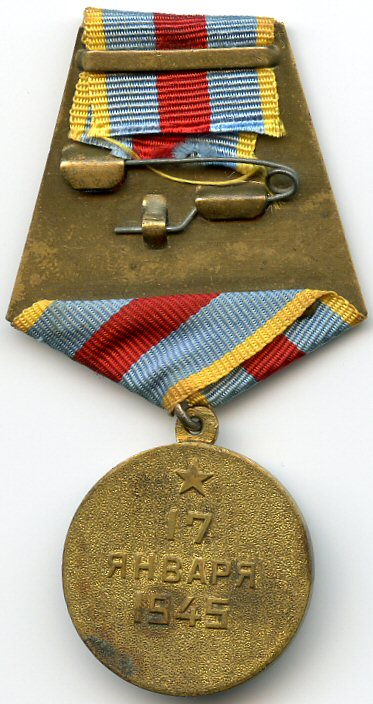
Reverse of the Medal "For the Liberation of Warsaw"

The Medal "For the Liberation of Warsaw" (Russian: Медаль «За освобождение Варшавы») was a World War II campaign medal of the military established on June 9, 1945 by decree of the Presidium of the Supreme Soviet of the USSR to satisfy the petition of the People's Commissariat for Defence of the Soviet Union.

== Statute ==
The Medal "For the Liberation of Warsaw" was "awarded to soldiers of the Red Army, Navy, and troops of the NKVD, direct participants of the heroic assault and liberation of the city of Warsaw as well as to the organizers and leaders of combat operations in the capture of this city".

Award of the medal was made on behalf of the Presidium of the Supreme Soviet of the USSR on the basis of documents attesting to actual participation in the liberation of Warsaw. Serving military personnel received the medal from their unit commander, retirees from military service received the medal from a regional, municipal or district military commissioner in the recipient's community.

The Medal "For the Liberation of Warsaw" was worn on the left side of the chest and in the presence of other awards of the USSR, was located immediately after the Medal "For the Liberation of Belgrade". If worn in the presence of Orders or medals of the Russian Federation, the latter have precedence.

== Description ==
The Medal "For the Liberation of Warsaw" was a 32mm in diameter circular brass medal with a raised rim on the obverse. On its obverse along the upper half of the medal's circumference, the relief inscription "FOR THE LIBERATION OF" (Russian: «ЗА ОСВОБОЖДЕНИЕ»), at the bottom, a relief five-pointed star radiating divergent rays upwards, superimposed over the rays, a ribbon bearing the relief inscription "WARSAW" (Russian: «ВАРШАВЫ»). On the reverse at the top, a relief plain five-pointed star over the relief date in three rows "17 JANUARY 1945" (Russian: «17 ЯНВАРЯ 1945»).

The Medal "For the Liberation of Warsaw" was secured by a ring through the metal suspension loop to a standard Soviet pentagonal mount covered by a 24mm wide blue silk moiré ribbon with a 2mm yellow edge stripes and a 6mm wide central red stripe.

== Recipients (partial list) ==
The individuals below were all recipients of the Medal "For the Liberation of Warsaw".

- Marshal of the Soviet Union Vasily Ivanovich Chuikov
- Marshal of the Soviet Union Konstantin Rokossovsky
- Captain Iosif Zeusovich "Ios" Teper
- Marshal of the Soviet Union Pavel Fyodorovich Batitsky
- Soviet and Polish Army General Stanislav Gilyarovich Poplavsky
- Marshal of Artillery Vasily Ivanovich Kazakov
- Army General Mikhail Sergeevich Malinin
- Army General Sagadat Kozhahmetovich Nurmagambetov
- Polish Brigadier General Mieczysław Cygan
- US Army Staff Sergeant Joseph R. Beyrle

== See also ==
- Awards and decorations of the Soviet Union
- Medal for Warsaw 1939–1945
- Vistula–Oder Offensive
- Warsaw Ghetto Uprising
- Warsaw
