= Pyotr Dementyev (politician) =

- Пётр Дементьев

Minister of Aviation Industry
- In office 2 March 1965 – 14 May 1977
- Preceded by: Position re-established; he also served as Chairman of the State Committee of the USSR Council of Ministers for Aviation Technology – Minister of the USSR
- Succeeded by: Vasily Aleksandrovich Kazakov

1st Chairman of the State Committee for Aviation Technology of the USSR – Minister of the USSR
- In office March 1963 – 2 March 1965
- Preceded by: Position established; he also served as Chairman of the State Committee of the USSR Council of Ministers for Aviation Technology
- Succeeded by: Position abolished; he also served as Minister of the Aviation Industry of the USSR

1st Chairman of the State Committee of the Council of Ministers of the USSR for Aviation Technology
- In office 14 December 1957 – March 1963
- Preceded by: He also served as Minister of the Aviation Industry of the USSR
- Succeeded by: He also served as Chairman of the State Committee for Aviation Technology of the USSR – Minister of the USSR

2nd Ministry of Aviation Industry of the USSR
- In office 24 August 1953 – 14 December 1957
- Preceded by: Position re-established; Mikhail Vasilyevich Khrunichev
- Succeeded by: He also served as Chairman of the State Committee of the Council of Ministers of the USSR for Aviation Technology – Minister of the USSR

Personal details
- Born: 24 January 1907 Alyoshkin-Saplyk, Ubeevskaya Volost, Buinsky Uyezd, Simbirsk Governorate, Russian Empire
- Died: 14 May 1977 Moscow, Soviet Union
- Party: CPSU (since 1938)
- Education: Zhukovsky Air Force Engineering Academy
- Awards: ×9
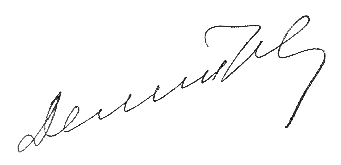
- Signature

Military service
- Branch/service: Aviation Engineering Service
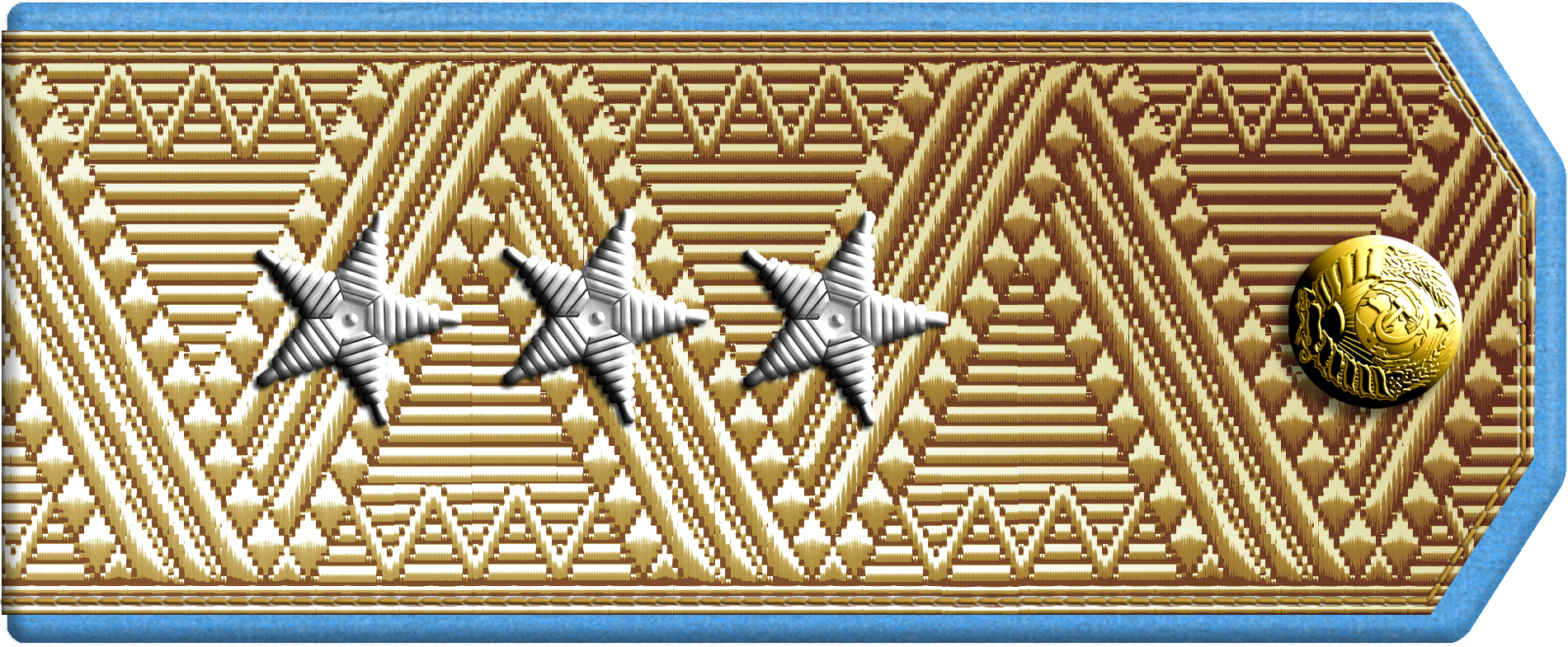
- Rank

Pyotr Vasilyevich Dementyev (Пётр Васильевич Дементьев; 11 (24) January 1907 – 14 May 1977) was a Soviet statesman who served twice as Minister of Aviation Industry from 1953 to 1957 and again from 1965 until his death in 1977 overseeing the post-war shift to jet and large-scale civil production in the USSR's aircraft sector. He held the rank of colonel general engineer (1976), was twice named Hero of Socialist Labour (1941, 1977), and sat on the CPSU Central Committee while serving as a deputy of the Supreme Soviet.

== Early life and education ==
Dementyev was born in the village of Ubei (now in Drozhzhanovsky District, Tatarstan), into a family of teachers; his birth date is recorded as 11 (24) January 1907 (Old Style/New Style).

== Career ==
Between 1934 and 1941, Dementyev advanced at the Kazan Aviation Plant, serving as a shop chief, chief engineer, and plant director. In early 1941 he was appointed First Deputy People's Commissar of Aviation Industry. During the war he was credited—together with industry teams with organising serial output under evacuation and mobilisation conditions, efforts for which he received his first Hero of Socialist Labour title in 1942.

After the March 1946 conversion of the wartime commissariat into the Ministry of Aviation Industry (MAP), Dementyev served as Deputy Minister.

== Awards and honours ==
For his work in aviation, Dementyev received numerous state honours, including the USSR State Prize (1953), nine Orders of Lenin, the Order of the Red Banner, the Order of Suvorov, 2nd class, the Order of Kutuzov, 1st class, two Orders of the Red Banner of Labour, the Order of the Red Star, and various medals. He was twice named Hero of Socialist Labour, first during the war and again in 1977, and was promoted to colonel general engineer in 1976.

== Literature ==
- Cuhaj, G.S. (2008). Standard Catalog of World Paper Money. General Issues 1368–1960 (12th ed.). Iola: Krause Publications. p. 1223. ISBN 978-0-89689-730-4.
- Parchimowicz, J.; Borkowski, T. (1997). Katalog banknotów polskich i iz Polska związanych (2nd ed.). Szczecin: Nefryt. p. 1223. ISBN 83-905709-8-X.
- Denisov, Alexander E. (2005). Paper Money of Russia 1769–1917. Part 4. Regional Paper Money 1800–1917. Moscow: Finance and Credit. p. 120. ISBN 5-8024-0035-8.
- Pravilova, Ekaterina A. (2006). Finances of the Empire: Money and Power in the Politics of Russia on the National Outskirts, 1801–1917. Moscow: Novoe Izdatelstvo. ISBN 5-98379-048-X.
