= Jubilee Medal "Forty Years of Victory in the Great Patriotic War 1941–1945" =

Commemorative medal of the Soviet Union

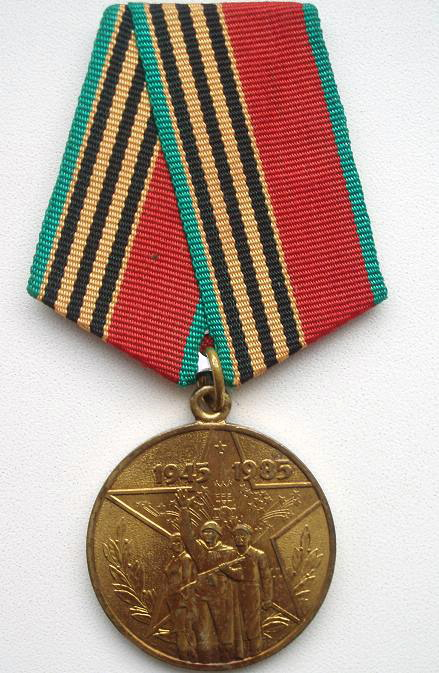
- Jubilee Medal "Forty Years of Victory in the Great Patriotic War 1941–1945" (obverse)
- Type: Jubilee medal
- Awarded for: Participation in World War 2
- Presented by: USSR
- Eligibility: Citizens of the Soviet Union
- Status: No longer awarded
- Established: April 12, 1985

Highlights
- Total: 11,268,980
- Ribbon of the Jubilee Medal "Forty Years of Victory in the Great Patriotic War 1941–1945"

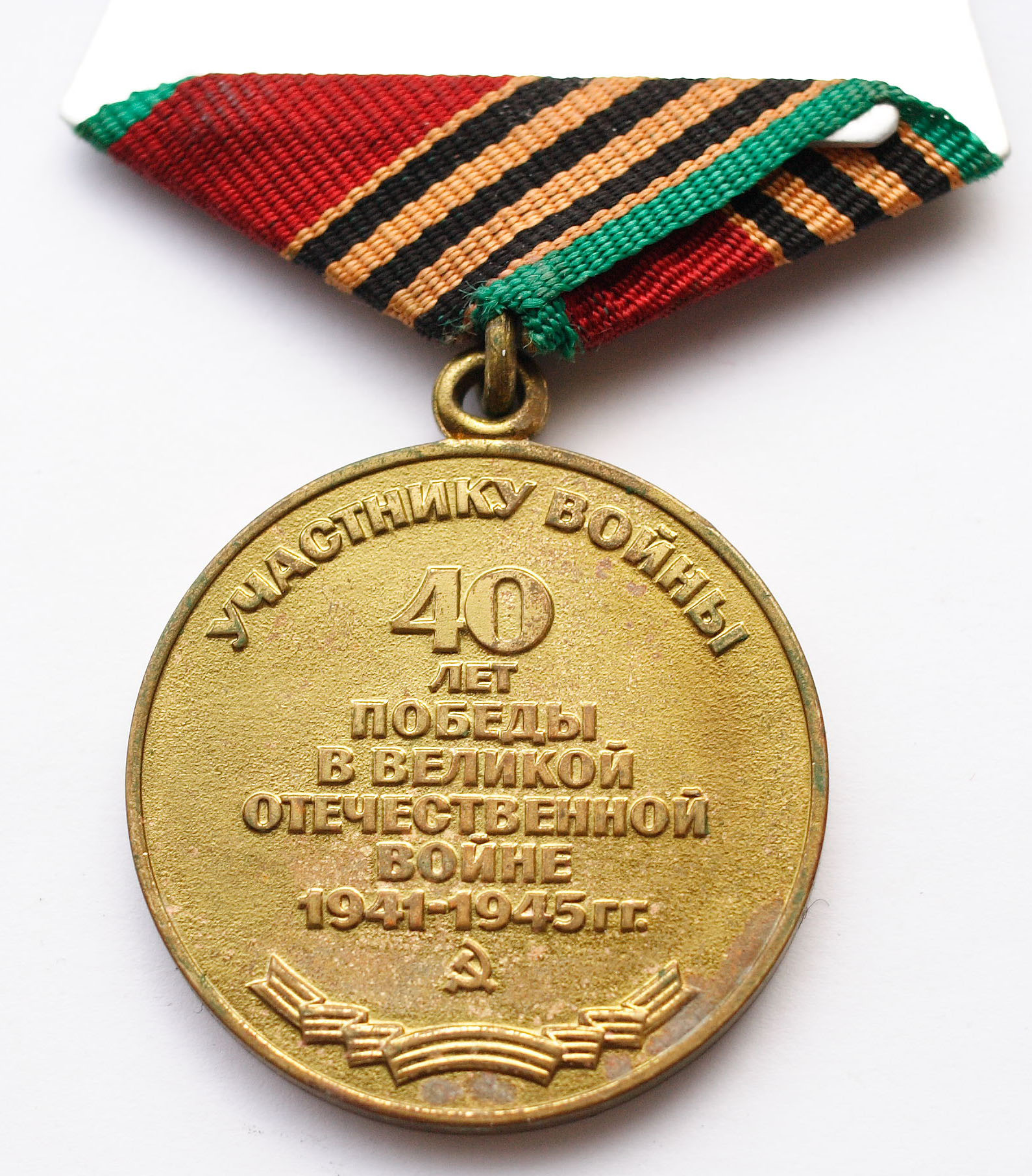
Reverse of the Jubilee Medal "Forty Years of Victory in the Great Patriotic War 1941–1945"

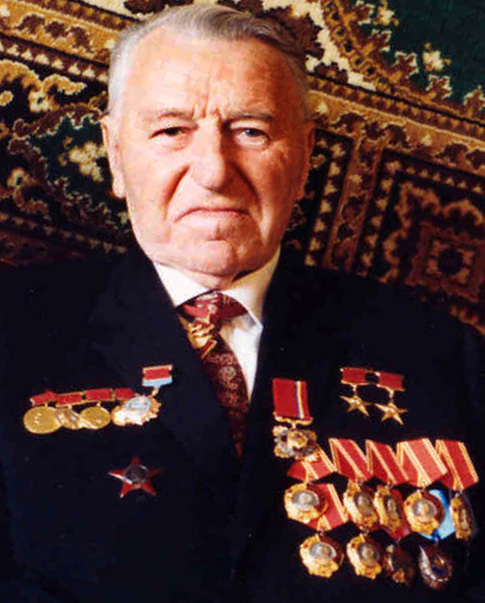
Renowned engineer Sergey Afanasiev, a recipient of the Jubilee Medal "Forty Years of Victory in the Great Patriotic War 1941–1945"

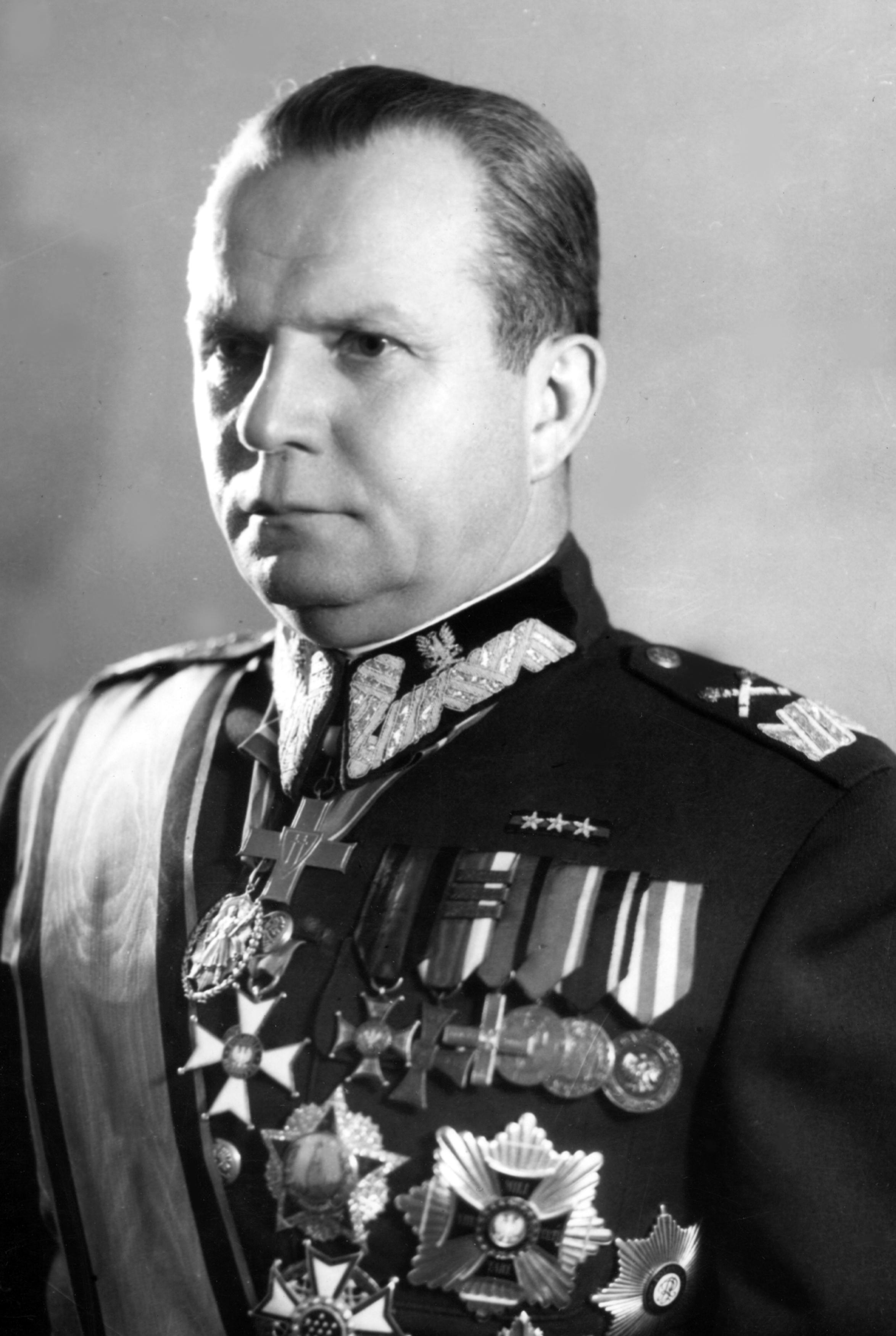
Polish General Michał Rola-Żymierski, a recipient of the Jubilee Medal "Forty Years of Victory in the Great Patriotic War 1941–1945"

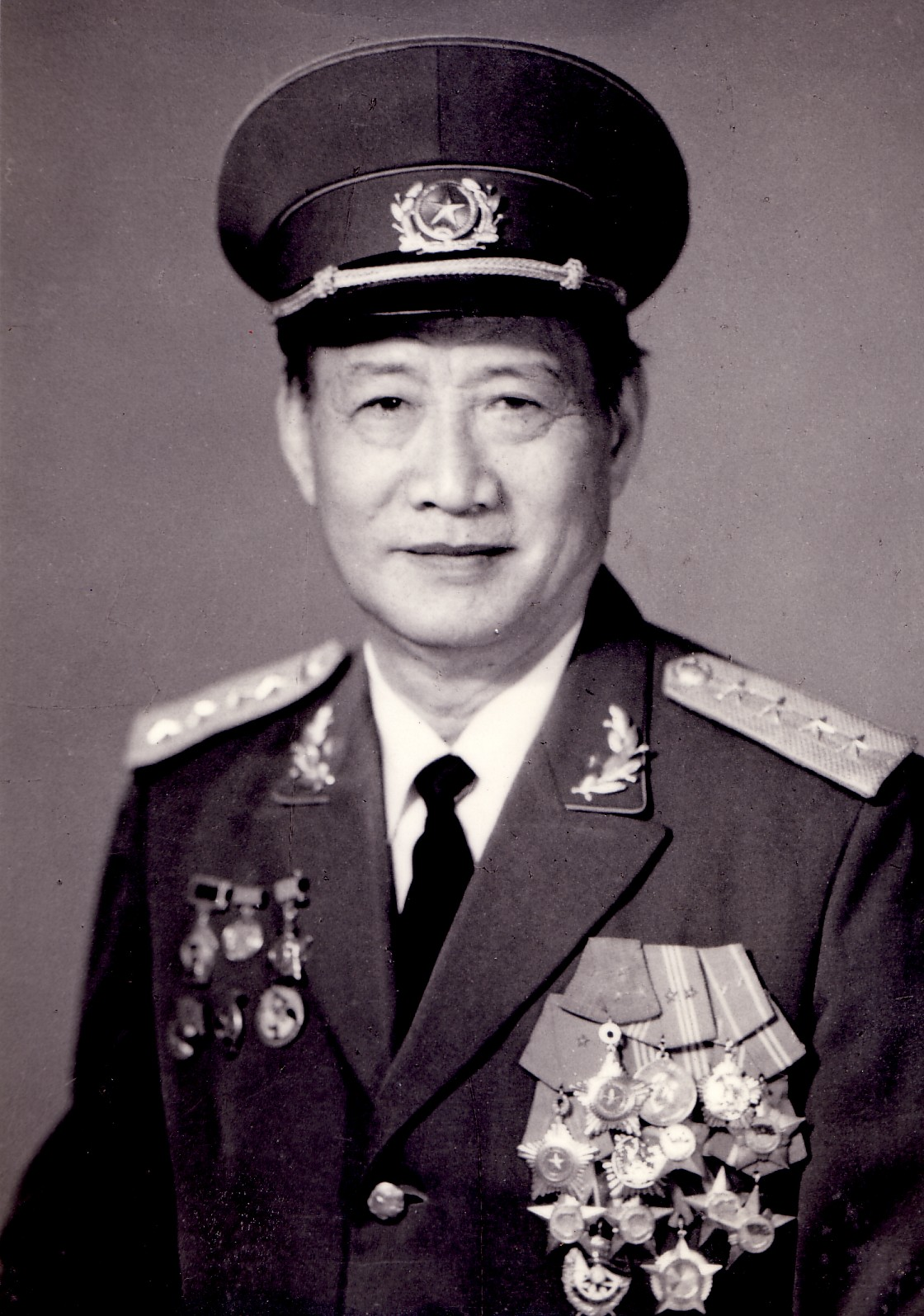
Vietnamese General Hoàng Văn Thái, a recipient of the Jubilee Medal "Forty Years of Victory in the Great Patriotic War 1941–1945"

The Jubilee Medal "Forty Years of Victory in the Great Patriotic War 1941–1945" (Russian: Юбилейная медаль «Сорок лет Победы в Великой Отечественной войне 1941—1945 гг.») was a state commemorative medal of the Soviet Union established on April 12, 1985, by decree of the Presidium of the Supreme Soviet of the USSR to denote the fortieth anniversary of the Soviet victory over Nazi Germany in World War II.

== Medal Statute ==
The Jubilee Medal "Forty Years of Victory in the Great Patriotic War 1941–1945" was awarded to: all military and civilian personnel of the Armed Forces of the USSR who took part in the Great Patriotic War of 1941 – 1945, to partisans of the Great Patriotic War, to the personnel of the Armed Forces of the USSR, as well as any other persons who were awarded the Medal "For the Victory over Germany in the Great Patriotic War 1941–1945" or the Medal "For the Victory over Japan"; to home front workers, who were awarded for their dedicated work during the Great Patriotic War Orders of the USSR, the Medal "For Valiant Labour in the Great Patriotic War 1941-1945", or other medals of the USSR such as "For the Defence of Leningrad", "For the Defence of Moscow", "For Defence of Odessa", "For the Defence of Sevastopol", "For the Defence of Stalingrad", "For the Defence of Kiev", "For the Defence of the Caucasus", "For the Defence of the Soviet Transarctic".

The medal was awarded on behalf of the Presidium of the Supreme Soviet of the USSR by commanders of military units, formations, the heads of agencies, institutions; by republican, territorial, regional, district or municipal military commissariats, the Supreme Council of the Union and autonomous republics, the executive committees of regional, provincial, county, district and municipal Soviets.

The Jubilee Medal "Forty Years of Victory in the Great Patriotic War 1941–1945" was worn on the left side of the chest and in the presence of other orders and medals of the USSR, was located immediately following the Jubilee Medal "Thirty Years of Victory in the Great Patriotic War 1941-1945". If worn in the presence of orders and medals of the Russian Federation, the latter have precedence.

== Description ==
The Jubilee Medal "Forty Years of Victory in the Great Patriotic War 1941–1945" was a 32 mm (1.3 in) diameter circular brass medal. On the obverse in the background, fireworks on both sides of the Kremlin's Spasskaya Tower within the relief outline of a large five pointed star positioned slightly off center to the right; the star's lower points superimposed over the relief image of laurel branches along the medal's lower circumference going halfway up both sides; at lower center going up three quarters of the way, the relief image of a soldier holding a machine gun, his right arm in the air, to his right, a female worker and to his left, a collective farmer. In the upper part, on both sides of the tower superimposed over the star's outline, the prominent relief dates "1945" and "1985". On the reverse, along the upper medal circumference, the relief inscription "WAR PARTICIPANT" (Russian: «УЧАСТНИКУ ВОЙНЫ») or "PARTICIPANT ON THE LABOUR FRONT" (Russian: «УЧАСТНИКУ ТРУДОВОГО ФРОНТА»), in the center, the relief inscription on seven lines "40 Years of Victory in the Great Patriotic War of 1941–1945" (Russian: «40 лет Победы в Великой Отечественной войне 1941—1945 гг.»). At the bottom, the relief image of the hammer and sickle over a Ribbon of St. George. On the medals struck to honour foreign nationals, the reverse inscriptions "WAR PARTICIPANT" or "PARTICIPANT ON THE LABOUR FRONT" were omitted. Ones with no inscriptions would be awarded to foreign leaders.

The medal was secured to a standard Soviet pentagonal mount by a ring through the medal suspension loop. The mount was covered by a 24 mm (0.94 in) wide red silk moiré ribbon with 2 mm (0.079 in) green edge stripes. On the left side, against the edge stripe, the 10 mm (0.39 in) wide Ribbon of St. George.

== Recipients (partial list) ==
This medal was awarded not only to citizens of the USSR, but also to foreigners.

The individuals below were all recipients of the Jubilee Medal "Forty Years of Victory in the Great Patriotic War 1941–1945".

=== Citizens of USSR ===
- Admiral of the Fleet Sergey Gorshkov
- Marshal of the Soviet Union Sergey Akhromeyev
- Marshal of the Soviet Union Sergei Sokolov
- Rocket scientist Boris Chertok
- Actress Elina Bystritskaya
- Marshal of the Russian Federation and Defence Minister Igor Sergeyev
- World War II combat pilot Natalya Meklin
- Musician Bahram Mansurov
- Military artist Lev Kerbel
- World War II fighter pilot Vasily Afonin
- Last General Secretary of the Communist Party of the Soviet Union Mikhail Sergeyevich Gorbachev
- Marshal of Aviation Alexander Ivanovich Pokryshkin
- Major General Vladimir Sergeyevich Ilyushin
- Captain Vasil Uładzimiravič Bykaŭ
- Colonel General Pavel Alekseyevich Kurochkin
- Colonel General Leonid Mikhaylovich Sandalov
- Colonel Ilya Grigoryevich Starinov
- Lieutenant Colonel Vasily Maximovich Afonin
- Captain 1st grade Ivan Vasilyevich Travkin
- Lieutenant General Galaktion Yeliseyevich Alpaidze
- Scientist Yuri Andreevich Yappa

=== Foreign recipients ===
- Chief Petty Officer Bill Stone (UK)
- General and President Wojciech Jaruzelski (Poland)
- General Michał Rola-Żymierski (Poland)
- Reverend Laurie Biggs (Australia)
- United States Merchant Marine Officer Romuald Paul Holubowicz (US/UK)
- United States Merchant Marine Navigation Officer Carl M. Metzger (US)
- Chief Petty Officer Bill Boddy
- Edward Makuka Nkoloso (Zambia)
- United States Merchant Marine, Herbert Fred Bennett (Boston, Mass, USA)
- Chief of Staff Hoàng Văn Thái (Vietnam)
- Sergeant Victor Miller (Royal Australian Air Force)
- Lieutenant Lionel Dennis Hook (RN officer)
- Chief ERA William Peel Royal Navy (Submarines) - UK- North Sea 1945
- President Ferdinand E. Marcos, (Philippines)
- Major General Yordan Milanov (Bulgaria)
- Piotr Fyodor Krakowski (soldier), (United States)
- United States Merchant Marine Donald A. Paschal (US)
- Royal Canadian Naval Volunteer Reserve Lieutenant (N) Wesley Gibson Gray (Canada)
- United States Merchant Marine Gerard A. Haefeli

== See also ==
- Great Patriotic War
- Orders, decorations, and medals of the Soviet Union
- Badges and Decorations of the Soviet Union
