= Gabriel Ilyich Urazovsky =

- Born: 21 March 1911; Rovenki, Ukraine
- Died: 5 January 1954 (aged 42); Taganrog, Russia
- Occupation: Major

Gabriel Ilyich Urazovsky (Russian: Гавриил Ильич Уразовский; 1911–1954) was a Soviet soldier, born in the Russian Empire. He was awarded the Order of Alexander Nevsky No. 857. And in June 1948 he was promoted to captain.

== Career ==
He served as commander of the 16th Guards Fighter Aviation Division. In July 1944 he was conferred the military rank of Major of the Guards. He freed Byelorussia and Poland, participated in Bobruisk, the Vistula–Oder Offensive, and Battle of Berlin operations. He was awarded two more military decorations before the end of the war.

== Awards ==
Major Urazovsky was a cavalier of three Orders of the Red Banner, of the Order of Alexander Nevsky, and of the Order of the Patriotic War 1st class. He was also awarded the Medal "For the Defence of Stalingrad", the Medal "For the Capture of Berlin" and the Medal "For the Victory over Germany in the Great Patriotic War 1941–1945".

He died January 5, 1954.
