= Medal "For the Liberation of Belgrade" =

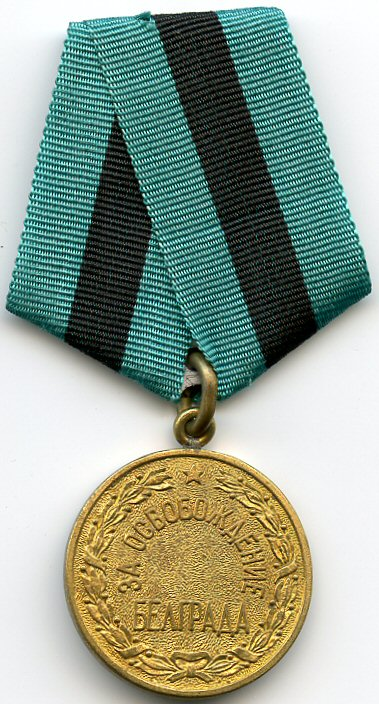
- Medal "For the Liberation of Belgrade" (obverse)
- Type: Campaign medal
- Awarded for: Participation in the liberation of Belgrade
- Presented by: USSR
- Eligibility: Citizens of the Soviet Union
- Status: No longer awarded
- Established: June 9, 1945

Highlights
- Total: ~70,000
- Ribbon of the Medal "For the Liberation of Belgrade"

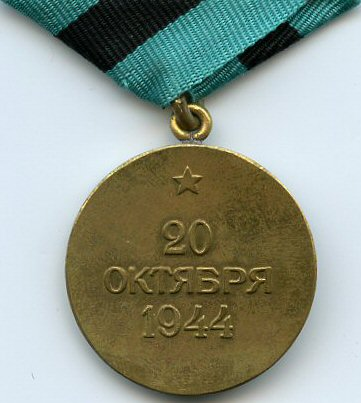
Reverse of the Medal "For the Liberation of Belgrade"

The Medal "For the Liberation of Belgrade" (Russian: Медаль «За освобождение Белграда») was a World War II campaign medal of the Soviet Union. It was established on June 9, 1945 by decree of the Presidium of the Supreme Soviet of the USSR to satisfy the petition of the People's Commissariat for Defence of the Soviet Union.

== Medal Statute ==
The Medal "For the Liberation of Belgrade" was awarded to soldiers of the Red Army, Navy, and troops of the NKVD, direct participants of the heroic assault and liberation of the city of Belgrade as well as to the organizers and leaders of combat operations in the capture of this city.

Award of the medal was made on behalf of the Presidium of the Supreme Soviet of the USSR on the basis of documents attesting to actual participation in the liberation of Belgrade. Serving military personnel received the medal from their unit commander, retirees from military service received the medal from a regional, municipal or district military commissioner in the recipient's community.

The Medal "For the Liberation of Belgrade" was worn on the left side of the chest and in the presence of other awards of the USSR, was located immediately after the Medal "For the Capture of Berlin". If worn in the presence of Orders or medals of the Russian Federation, the latter have precedence.

== Medal Description ==
The Medal "For the Liberation of Belgrade" was a 32mm in diameter circular brass medal with a raised rim on the obverse. On its obverse along the entire medal circumference, a laurel wreath split only at the top by a small five pointed star, within the wreath, along its upper inner circumference, the relief inscription "FOR THE LIBERATION" (Russian: «ЗА ОСВОБОЖДЕНИЕ»), at lower center just above the wreath, the horizontal relief inscription " OF BELGRADE" (Russian: «БЕЛГРАДА»). On the reverse at the top, a relief plain five pointed star over the relief date in three rows "20 OCTOBER 1944" (Russian: «20 ОКТЯБРЯ 1944»).

The Medal "For the Liberation of Belgrade" was secured by a ring through the medal suspension loop to a standard Soviet pentagonal mount covered by a 24mm wide green silk moiré ribbon with 8mm wide black central stripe.

== Recipients (partial list) ==
The individuals below were all recipients of the Medal "For the Liberation of Belgrade".

- Marshal of the Soviet Union Fyodor Ivanovich Tolbukhin
- Marshal of the Soviet Union Sergey Semyonovich Biryuzov
- Sapper Vladimir Fedorovich Chekalov
- Army General Semion Pavlovich Ivanov

== See also ==
- Awards and decorations of the Soviet Union
- Belgrade Offensive
- Belgrade
