= Jubilee Medal "60 Years of the Armed Forces of the USSR" =

Commemorative medal of the Soviet Union

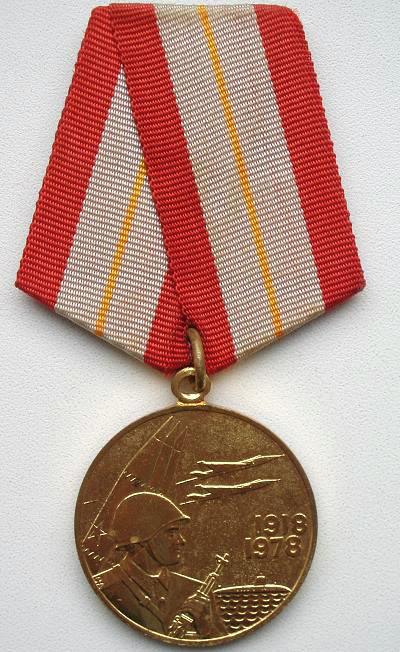
- Jubilee Medal "60 Years of the Armed Forces of the USSR" (obverse)
- Type: Jubilee medal
- Awarded for: Military service on February 28, 1978
- Presented by: USSR
- Eligibility: Citizens of the Soviet Union
- Status: No longer awarded
- Established: January 28, 1978

Highlights
- Total: 10,723,340
- Ribbon of the Jubilee Medal "60 Years of the Armed Forces of the USSR"

The Jubilee Medal "60 Years of the Armed Forces of the USSR" (Russian: Юбилейная медаль «60 лет Вооружённых Сил СССР») was a state military commemorative medal of the Soviet Union established and bestowed upon military personnel to denote the sixtieth anniversary of the creation of the armed forces of the Soviet Union. It was established on January 28, 1978 by decree of the Presidium of the Supreme Soviet of the Soviet Union. Its statute was amended by decree of the Presidium of the Supreme Soviet of the Soviet Union on July 18, 1980.

== Medal statute ==
The Jubilee Medal "60 Years of the Armed Forces of the USSR" was awarded to officers, warrant officers, sergeants, petty officers, sailors and soldiers, enlisted in the service and on active duty on February 23, 1978 in the Soviet Army, Navy, in the troops of the Ministry of Internal Affairs, in the armed forces of organs of the State Security, in the Council of Ministers of the USSR; to former Red Guards, soldiers who took part in the fighting to protect the Soviet homeland in the Armed Forces of the USSR, to partisans of the Civil War and the Great Patriotic War of 1941–1945; persons discharged from active military service in the reserve or retired, who served in the Soviet Army, Navy, in the troops of the Ministry of Internal Affairs, in the armed forces and organs of the State Security Council of Ministers of the USSR for 20 years or more or that were awarded during their active duty, military orders of the USSR or the medals "For courage", Ushakov, "For Military Merit", "For Distinction in Protection of State Border of the USSR", Nakhimov, "For Distinction in Military Service”.

The medal was awarded on behalf of the Presidium of the Supreme Soviet of the USSR by commanders of military units, agencies and institutions. For retirees, by the republican, territorial, regional, district, municipal and district military commissariats. Each medal came with an attestation of award, which attestation came in the form of a small 8 cm by 11 cm cardboard booklet bearing the award's name, the recipient's particulars and an official stamp and signature on the inside.

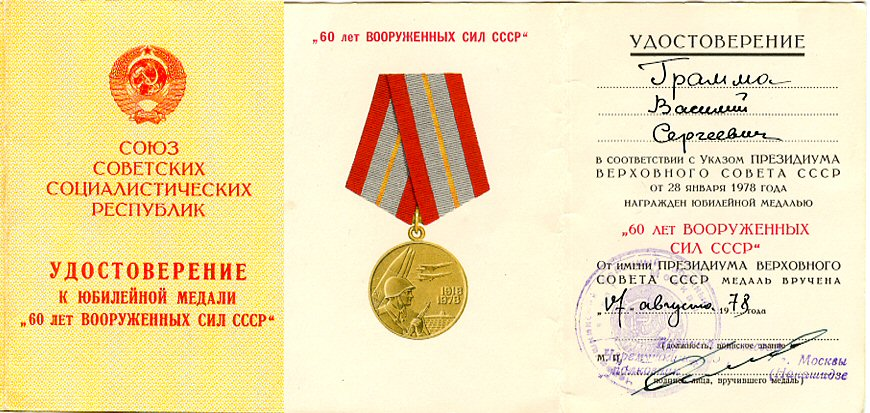
Attestation of the award booklet of the Jubilee Medal "60 Years of the Armed Forces of the USSR" (cover and inside pages)

The Jubilee Medal "60 Years of the Armed Forces of the USSR" was worn on the left side of the chest, and when in the presence of other medals of the USSR, it was located immediately after the Jubilee Medal "50 Years of the Armed Forces of the USSR". If worn in the presence of the Russian Federation, the latter has precedence.

== Medal description ==
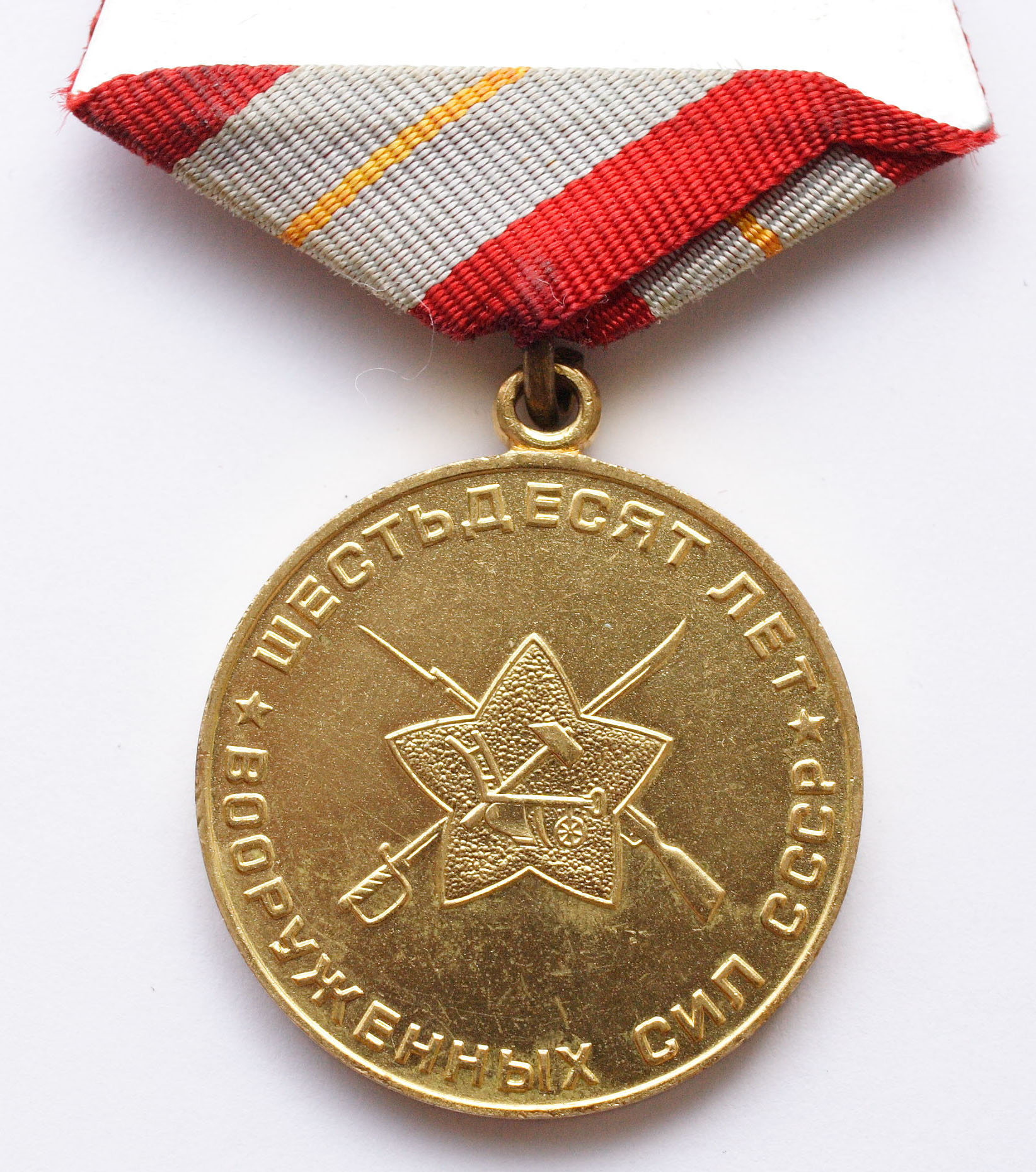
Reverse of the Jubilee Medal "60 Years of the Armed Forces of the USSR"

The Jubilee Medal "60 Years of the Armed Forces of the USSR" was a 32mm in diameter brass circular medal with a raised rim on both sides. On its obverse, in the background at left, three rockets pointing skyward toward the upper right, at the upper right, two military jets flying level in formation towards the right, in the forefront at the lower left, the relief image of a helmeted Soviet soldier facing right holding a rifle, to his right on the horizon, the relief image of a surfaced submarine at sea, just above the submarine, at the right, the superimposed dates "1918" and "1978." On the reverse, along the entire circumference of the medal, the circular relief inscription: "Sixty Years" and "Armed Forces of the USSR" (Russian: «Шестьдесят лет» и «Вооружённых Сил СССР»), separated by two small relief five-pointed stars. In the center, a five-pointed star with a pebbled finish superimposed on a crossed rifle and sabre, in the star, a hammer and a plough.

The medal was secured to a standard Soviet pentagonal mount by a ring through the medal suspension loop. The mount was covered by a 24mm wide grey silk moiré ribbon with 5mm red edge stripes and a central 1mm yellow stripe.

== Recipients (partial list) ==
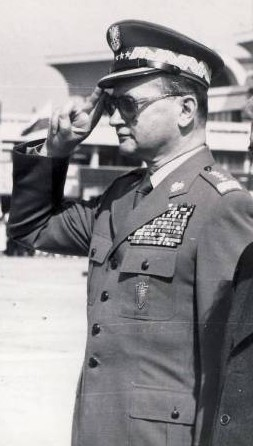
Polish General Wojciech Jaruzelski, a foreign recipient of the Jubilee Medal "60 Years of the Armed Forces of the USSR"

All individuals listed below are recipients of the Jubilee Medal "60 Years of the Armed Forces of the USSR".

- Dmitriy Ustinov, Marshal of the Soviet Union and Minister of Defense of the USSR
- Ex KGB officer, later director of the FSB, Nikolai Platonovich Patrushev
- Major General Igor Dmitrievich Sergun
- Polish Brigadier General Mieczysław Cygan
- Polish General and President Wojciech Witold Jaruzelski
- Politician and First President of the Russian Federation Boris Nikolayevich Yeltsin
- Captain 1st grade Ivan Vasilyevich Travkin
- Captain 3rd grade Michael Petrovich Tsiselsky
- Captain Iosif Zeusovich "Ios" Teper
- Colonel General Gennady Nikolayevich Troshev
- Army General Yury Nikolayevich Baluyevsky
- Lieutenant General Semyon Moiseevich Krivoshein
- Colonel General Boris Vsevolodovich Gromov
- Major General Alexey Arkhipovich Leonov
- Marshal of Aviation Alexander Ivanovich Pokryshkin
- Major General Vladimir Sergeyevich Ilyushin
- Vladislav Aleksandrovich Tretiak
- Marshal of the Soviet Union Sergey Fyodorovich Akhromeyev
- Lieutenant General Ruslan Sultanovich Aushev
- Admiral of the Fleet of the Soviet Union Sergey Georgiyevich Gorshkov
- Pyotr Mironovich Masherov
- Admiral Gordey Ivanovich Levchenko
- Admiral Vladimir Grigor'evich Yegorov
- Army General Viktor Germanovich Kazantsev
- Army General Anatoly Vasiliyevich Kvashnin
- Marshal of the Soviet Union Pavel Fyodorovich Batitsky
- Sergeant Meliton Varlamovich Kantaria
- Nikolay Aleksandrovich Annenkov

== See also ==
- Red Army
- Awards and decorations of the Soviet Union
