= Mieczysław Cygan =

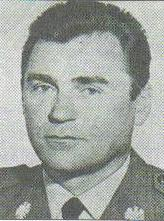
Brigadier General Mieczysław Cygan

Mieczysław Cygan (born 2 August 1921 in Koniuszki, died 7 April 2006 in Warsaw) - Polish military commander, Brigadier General of the Polish Army, military governor of Gdańsk (1982–1988), Secretary General of the Council for the Protection of Struggle and Martyrdom Sites (1989–1990).

== Honours and awards ==
- Commander's Cross with Star of the Order of Polonia Restituta, previously awarded Commander's Cross, Officer's Cross and the Knight's Cross
- Order of the Banner of Labour, first and second classes
- Order of the Grunwald Cross, 3rd class
- Gold Cross of Merit
- Silver Cross of Merit
- Medal of the 10th-Anniversary of People's Poland
- Medal of the 30th-Anniversary of People's Poland
- Medal of the 40th-Anniversary of People's Poland
- Medal for participation in the defensive war in 1939
- Medal of Warsaw 1939-1945
- Medal for Odra, Nysa, the Baltic
- Medal of Victory and Freedom 1945
- Gold Medal of the Armed Forces in the Service of the Fatherland
- Medal "For the Capture of Berlin"
- Gold Medal of Merit for National Defence
- Medal of the National Education Commission
- Badge of the 1000th anniversary of the Polish State
- Commander of the Order of Skanderbeg (Albania)
- Czechoslovak War Cross (Czechoslovakia) 1939
- Bronze Medal of the Brotherhood of Arms (German Democratic Republic)
- Order of the Patriotic War, 1st class (USSR)
- Medal "For the Liberation of Warsaw" (USSR)
- Medal "For the Victory over Germany in the Great Patriotic War 1941–1945" (USSR)
- Jubilee Medal "60 Years of the Armed Forces of the USSR"

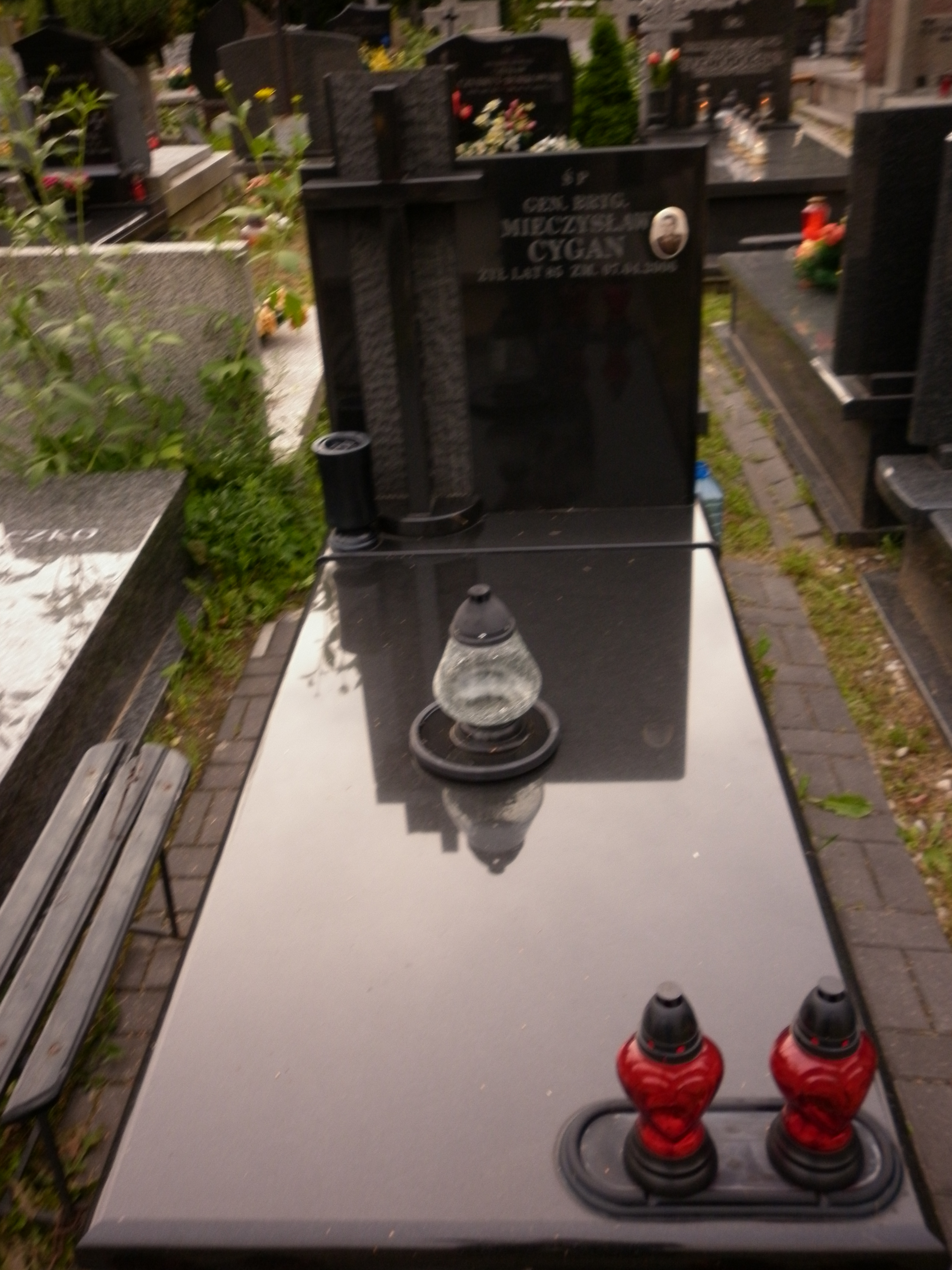
Mieczysław Cygan's tomb.
