= Vasily Kazakov =

Soviet Marshal of the artillery

- Василий Казаков
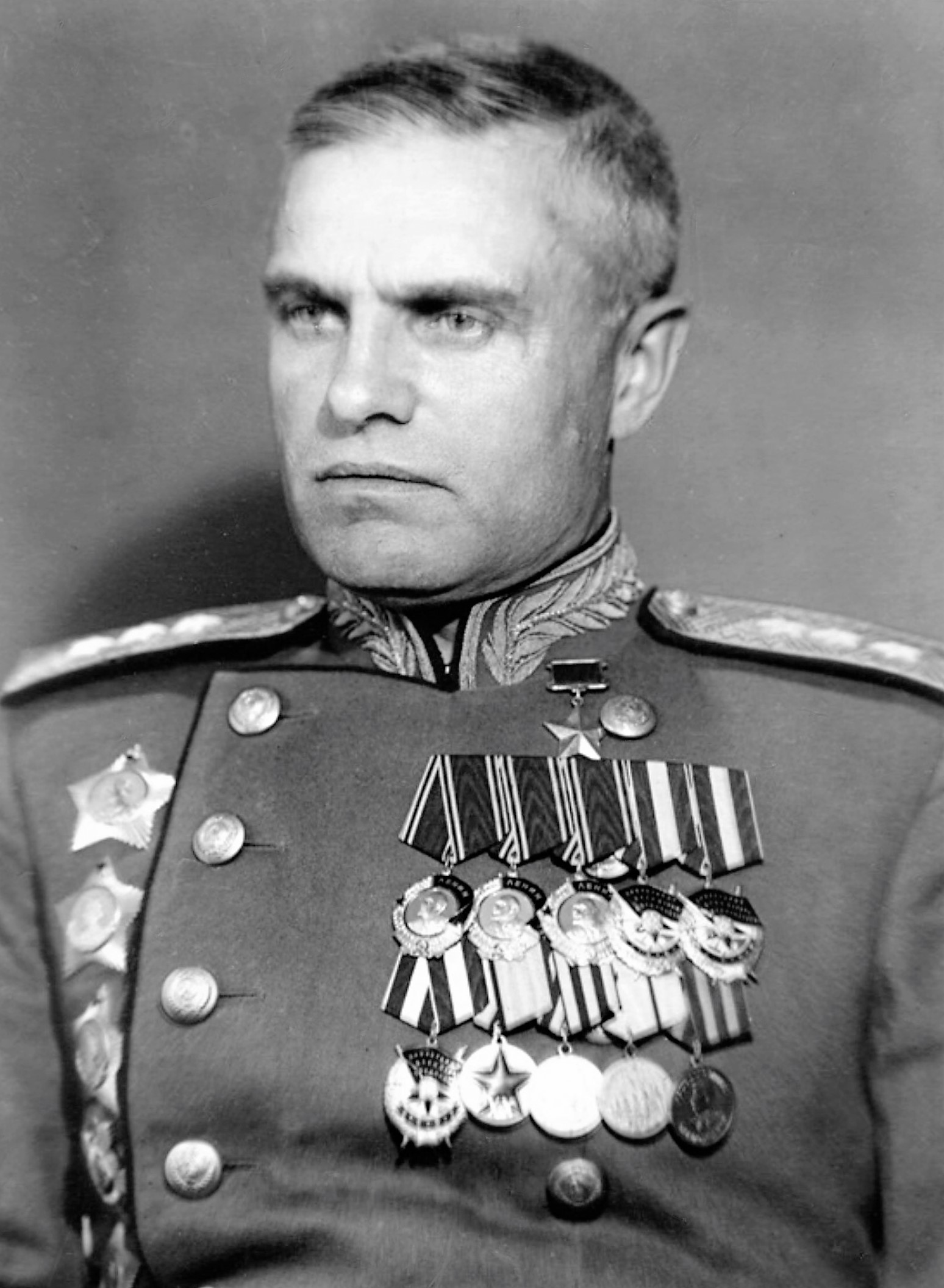
- Kazakov in 1946
- Born: July 18, 1898; Filipovo, Buturlinsky District, Nizhny Novgorod Oblast, Russian Empire
- Died: May 25, 1968 (aged 69); Moscow, Soviet Union
- Burial place: Novodevichy Cemetery
- Military career
- Allegiance: Russian Empire (1915–1917); Soviet Union (1917–1968)
- Service years: 1915 – 1965
- Rank: Marshal of the Artillery
- Conflicts: World War I Russian Civil War; Polish-Soviet War; World War II
- Awards: Hero of the Soviet Union; Virtuti Militari; Cross of Grunwald

Vasily Ivanovich Kazakov (Russian: Василий Иванович Казаков; 18 July [O.S. 6 July] 1898 – 25 May 1968) was a Soviet Marshal of the artillery.

== Biography ==
=== Early life ===
Born to a peasant family at Filipovo in Nizhny Novgorod Oblast, he was drafted into the Imperial Army in May 1915 and participated in the First World War. After being wounded in the area of Riga at early 1917, Kazakov was transferred to a reserve unit in St. Peterburg. There, he took part in the February Revolution. When the army was dissolved, following the October Revolution, he was demobilized. Kazakov soon volunteered to join the newly established Red Army, where he commanded an artillery battery throughout the Russian Civil War and the Polish-Soviet War. In 1925, Kazakov graduated from the Artillery Academy of Moscow, joining the All-Union Communist Party (B) at 1932. Two years later he finished his studies in the Frunze Academy. On 7 May 1940, he was promoted to the rank of Major General.

=== World War II ===
At the beginning of the Great Patriotic War, he commanded the 7th Mechanized Corps' artillery formations. Kazakov took part in the battles for Smolensk and Moscow, and developed new methods for the use of anti-tank artillery, which were adopted by the entire army. In July 1942 he was made Rokossovsky's artillery commander at the Bryansk Front. In that capacity, he continued to work with the General at the Stalingrad, Don, Central and 1st Belorussian Fronts. On 17 November 1942, he became a Lieutenant General, and was made a Colonel-General on 18 September 1943. Kazakov was among the planners of the Kursk deep defense lines. He participated in the Lower Dnieper Offensive, in Operation Bagration and in the battles inside Germany. For his contribution to the Vistula-Oder Offensive, Kazakov was awarded the title Hero of the Soviet Union (Medal no. 5871) on 6 April 1945.

=== Post-war career ===
After the war, he commanded the artillery formations of the GSFG, and beginning in March 1950 he was the first deputy commander of the Artillery Corps. In January 1952 he became their commander, but was demoted to deputy again in April 1953. Kazakov was promoted to the rank of Marshal on 11 March 1955, commanding the Ground Forces' Air Defence from 1958 until 1965. After three more years as an inspector in the Ministry of Defense, he died in Moscow, aged 69, in May 1968.

== Honours and awards ==
- Hero of the Soviet Union
- Four Orders of Lenin (8 October 1942, 21 February 1945, 6 April 1945, 30 July 1958)
- Order of the Red Banner, five times (12 April 1942, 27 August 1943, 3 November 1944, 24 August 1948, 22 February 1968)
- Order of Suvorov, 1st class, three times (29 July 1944, 18 November 1944, 29 May 1945) and 2nd Class (2 October 1943)
- Order of Kutuzov, 1st class (8 February 1943)
- Order of the Red Star (16 August 1936)
- Jubilee Medal "XX Years of the Workers' and Peasants' Red Army" (22 February 1938)
- Medal "For the Defence of Moscow" (1 May 1944)
- Medal "For the Defence of Stalingrad" (22 December 1942)
- Medal "For the Victory over Germany in the Great Patriotic War 1941–1945" (9 May 1945)
- Jubilee Medal "Twenty Years of Victory in the Great Patriotic War 1941-1945"(7 May 1965)
- Medal "For the Capture of Berlin" (9 June 1944)
- Medal "For the Liberation of Warsaw" (9 June 1945)
- Medal "In Commemoration of the 800th Anniversary of Moscow" (20 September 1947)
- Jubilee Medal "30 Years of the Soviet Army and Navy" (22 February 1948)
- Jubilee Medal "40 Years of the Armed Forces of the USSR" (18 December 1957)
- Jubilee Medal "50 Years of the Armed Forces of the USSR" (23 February 1968)
- Virtuti Militari (Poland, Russia) 4th class (Poland, 24 April 1946)
- Cross of Grunwald, 2nd class (Poland, 24 April 1946)
- Medal for Oder, Neisse and Baltic (Poland, 26. October 1945)
- Medal for Warsaw 1939-1945 (Poland, 26 October 1945)
- Medal of Sino-Soviet Friendship (China, 23 February 1955)
