= Medal "For the Capture of Berlin" =

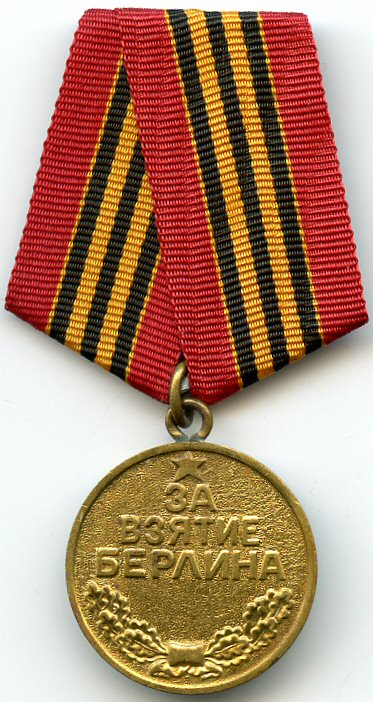
- Medal "For the Capture of Berlin" (obverse)
- Type: Campaign medal
- Awarded for: Participation in the Battle of Berlin
- Presented by: USSR
- Eligibility: Citizens of the Soviet Union
- Status: No longer awarded
- Established: June 9, 1945

Highlights
- Total: ca. 1,100,000
- Ribbon of the Medal "For the Capture of Berlin"

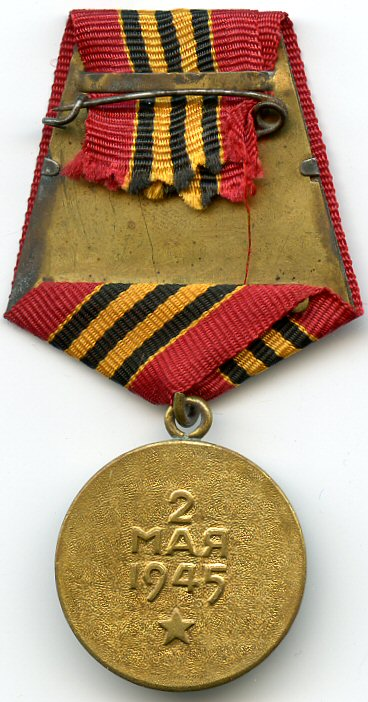
Reverse of the Medal "For the Capture of Berlin"

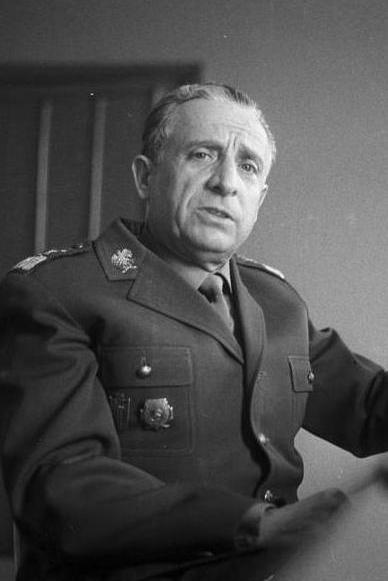
Marshal of Poland Marian Spychalski, a recipient of the Medal "For the Capture of Berlin"

The Medal "For the Capture of Berlin" (Russian: Медаль «За взятие Берлина») was a World War II campaign medal of the Soviet Union established on June 9, 1945, by decree of the Presidium of the Supreme Soviet of the USSR to satisfy the petition of the People's Commissariat for Defense of the Soviet Union. The medal's statute was amended on July 18, 1980, by decree of the Presidium of the Supreme Soviet of the USSR No. 2523-X.

== Medal statute ==
The Medal "For the Capture of Berlin" was awarded to soldiers of the Red Army, Navy, and troops of the NKVD, direct participants of the assault and capture of Berlin as well as to the organizers and leaders of combat operations in the capture of this city.

Award of the medal was made on behalf of the Presidium of the Supreme Soviet of the USSR on the basis of documents attesting to actual participation in the capture of Berlin. Serving military personnel received the medal from their unit commander, retirees from military service received the medal from a regional, municipal or district military commissioner in the recipient's community.

The Medal "For the Capture of Berlin" was worn on the left side of the chest and in the presence of other awards of the USSR, was located immediately after the Medal "For the Capture of Vienna". If worn in the presence of orders or medals of the Russian Federation, the latter have precedence.

== Medal description ==
The Medal "For the Capture of Berlin" was a 32mm in diameter circular brass medal with a raised rim on the obverse. On its pebbled obverse at the top, a plain five-pointed star, its top point touching the medal upper rim. Below the star, the relief inscription in bold letters on three rows "FOR THE CAPTURE OF BERLIN" (Russian: «ЗА ВЗЯТИЕ БЕРЛИНА») ending halfway down the medal. At the bottom, the relief image of a wreath of oak branches going up the left and right circumference of the medal up to the lower row of the inscription. On the reverse near the top, the relief date on three rows over a relief plain five-pointed star "2 MAY 1945" (Russian: «2 МАЯ 1945»).

The Medal "For the Capture of Berlin" was secured by a ring through the medal suspension loop to a standard Soviet pentagonal mount covered by a 24mm wide red silk moiré ribbon with a 12mm wide Ribbon of St. George in the center.

== Notable recipients ==
=== Soviet people ===
- Marshal of the Soviet Union Georgy Konstantinovich Zhukov
- Marshal of Armoured Troops Mikhail Efimovich Katukov
- Reichstag attacker Lieutenant Alexei Berest
- Reichstag flag raiser Sergeant Meliton Varlamovich Kantaria
- Reichstag flag raiser Sergeant Mikhail Alekseevich Yegorov
- Marshal of Aviation Alexander Ivanovich Pokryshkin
- Marshal of the Soviet Union Vasily Ivanovich Chuikov
- Marshal of the Soviet Union Ivan Ignatyevich Yakubovsky
- Marshal of the Soviet Union Ivan Stepanovich Konev
- Marshal of the Soviet Union Konstantin Rokossovskiy
- Captain Iosif Zeusovich "Ios" Teper
- Army General Ivan Yefimovich Petrov
- Marshal of the Soviet Union Pavel Fyodorovich Batitsky
- Lieutenant General Semyon Moiseevich Krivoshein
- Colonel General Yakov Timofeyevich Cherevichenko
- Army General Ivan Ivanovich Fedyuninsky
- Sailor Lev Efimovich Kerbel
- Fighter ace Lieutenant Colonel Vasily Maximovich Afonin
- Marshal of Artillery Vasily Ivanovich Kazakov
- Army General Mikhail Sergeevich Malinin
- Marshal of Aviation Serhi Gnatovich Rudenko
- Lieutenant General Nikolai Pavlovich Simoniak
- Captain Gabriel Ilyich Urazovsky
- Army General Sagadat Kozhahmetovich Nurmagambetov
- Sergeant Shabsa Mashkautsan, Hero of the Soviet Union

=== Foreign nationals ===
- General, later President Wojciech Witold Jaruzelski (Poland)
- Marshal of Poland Marian "Marek" Spychalski (Poland)
- Army General Stanislav Gilyarovich Poplavsky (Poland)
- Brigadier General Mieczysław Cygan (Poland)

== See also ==
- Battle of Berlin
- Ribbon of St. George
- Medal for Participation in the Battle of Berlin
- Orders, decorations, and medals of the Soviet Union
