= Apollon Systsov =

Soviet politician (1929–2005)

- Аполлон Сысцов

Minister of Aviation Industry
- In office 1 November 1985 – 24 August 1991
- Preceded by: Ivan Silayev
- Succeeded by: Office abolished

Personal details
- Born: Apollon Sergeevich Systsov; 25 September 1929 Melekess, Soviet Union
- Died: 8 May 2005 (aged 75) Moscow, Russia
- Resting place: Troyekurovskoye cemetery, Moscow
- Party: Communist Party

Apollon Systsov (Russian: Аполлон Сысцов; 25 September 1929 – 8 May 2005) was a Soviet engineer and statesman who held several posts. He was the last minister of aviation industry.

== Early life and education ==
Systsov was born in Melekess (now Dimitrovgrad) on 25 September 1929. His father worked as a Russian-language teacher. He graduated from the Tashkent Polytechnic Institute obtaining a degree in mechanical engineering with a focus on aircraft construction.

== Career ==
Following his graduation Systsov worked at the Tashkent Aviation Plant. After working in different posts he was made the general director of the Ulyanovsk Aviation Industrial Complex and a member of the collegium of the Ministry of Aviation Industry. He joined the Communist Party and was among its central committee members. He was appointed first deputy minister of the aviation industry in 1981 and remained in the post until 1985. Systsov was named as the minister of the aviation industry in 1985, replacing Ivan Silayev in the post. Systsov's term as minister ended in August 1991 when the ministry was also disestablished.

== Death ==
Systsov died in Moscow on 8 May 2005 and was buried at the Troyekurovskoye cemetery, Moscow.

== Awards ==
Systsov was the recipient of the following: Order of Lenin, Order of the October Revolution and Order of the Red Banner of Labour (twice) and USSR State Prize.
