= Jubilee Medal "50 Years of the Armed Forces of the USSR" =

Commemorative medal of the Soviet Union

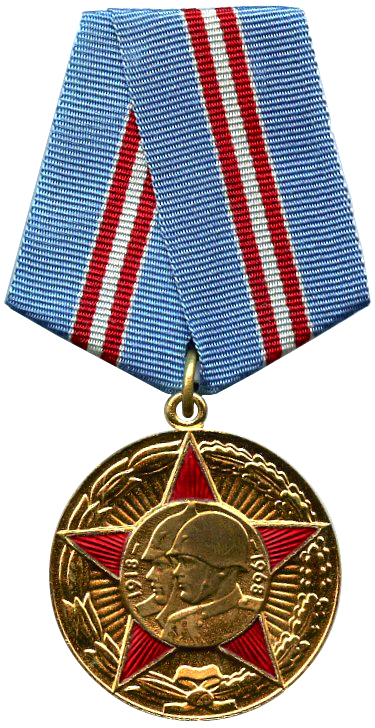
- Jubilee Medal "50 Years of the Armed Forces of the USSR" (obverse)
- Type: Jubilee medal
- Awarded for: Military service on February 23, 1968
- Presented by: USSR
- Eligibility: Citizens of the Soviet Union
- Status: No longer awarded
- Established: December 26, 1967

Highlights
- Total: 9,527,270
- Ribbon of the Jubilee Medal "50 Years of the Armed Forces of the USSR"

The Jubilee Medal "50 Years of the Armed Forces of the USSR" (Russian: Юбилейная медаль «50 лет Вооружённых Сил СССР») was a state military commemorative medal of the Soviet Union established on December 26, 1967 by decree of the Presidium of the Supreme Soviet of the USSR to denote the fiftieth anniversary of the creation of the Soviet Armed Forces. Its statute was amended on three occasions, by decrees of the Presidium of the Supreme Soviet of the USSR of February 22, 1968, of December 19, 1969, and of July 18, 1980.

== Medal Statute ==
The Jubilee Medal "50 Years of the Armed Forces of the USSR" was awarded to marshals, generals, admirals, officers and warrant officers, sergeants, soldiers and sailors in the service on February 23, 1968 as part of the Soviet Army, Navy, troops of the Ministry of Internal Affairs, KGB troops, the Council of Ministers of the USSR; cadets and students of military educational institutions of the Soviet Army, Navy, of the troops of the Ministry of Internal Affairs, of the troops of the KGB; marshals, generals, admirals and officers discharged from active military service, in the reserve or retired that have seniority in the Soviet Army, Navy, in troops of the Ministry of Internal Affairs, in the army or state security organs, in the Council of Ministers of the USSR, of 20 or more years; Heroes of the Soviet Union and individuals awarded the Order of Glory in all three classes.

Decree of the Presidium of the Supreme Soviet of February 22, 1968 added as recipients: former members of the Red Guards, soldiers who took part in the fighting to protect the Soviet homeland in the Armed Forces of the USSR, as well as all those who were awarded Orders or medals of the USSR "For Valour", Ushakov, "For Military Merit", "For Distinction in Protection of the State Border of the USSR", Nakhimov, "For Labour Valour" or "For Labour" during active duty.

Decree of the Presidium of the Supreme Soviet of December 19, 1969 added as recipients: partisans and guerrillas of the Civil War and of the Great Patriotic War of 1941 - 1945.

The medal was awarded on behalf of the Presidium of the Supreme Soviet of the USSR by commanders of military units, agencies and institutions. For retirees, by republican, territorial, regional, district, municipal and district military commissariats. Each medal came with an attestation of award, this attestation came in the form of a small 8 cm by 11 cm cardboard booklet bearing the award's name, the recipient's particulars and an official stamp and signature on the inside.

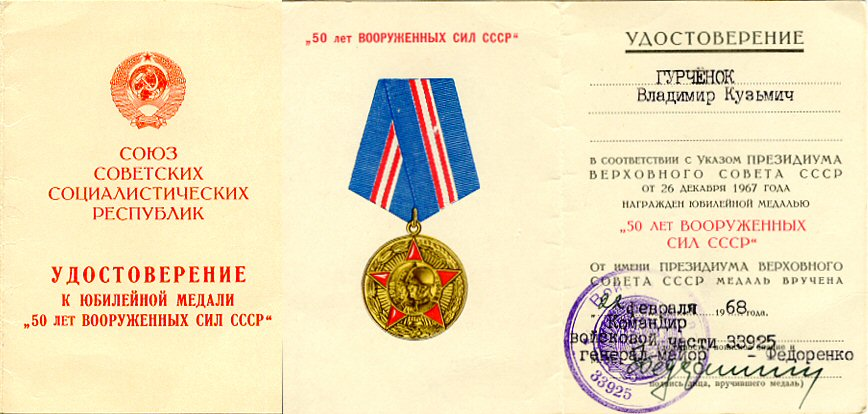
Attestation of award booklet of the Jubilee Medal "50 Years of the Armed Forces of the USSR" (cover and inside pages)

The Jubilee Medal "50 Years of the Armed Forces of the USSR" was worn on the left side of the chest and when in the presence of other medals of the USSR, it was located immediately after the Jubilee Medal "40 Years of the Armed Forces of the USSR". If worn in the presence or awards of the Russian Federation, the latter have precedence.

== Medal Description ==
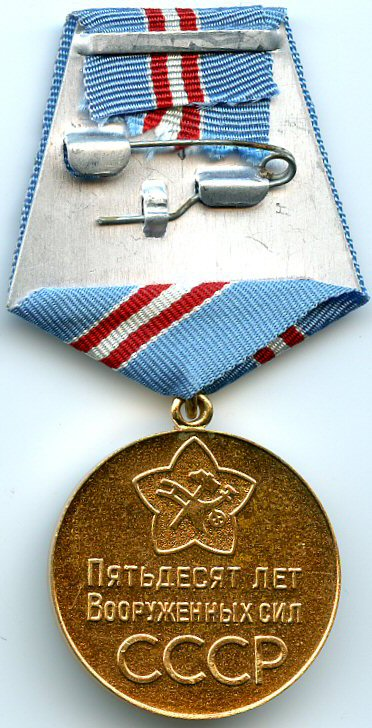
Reverse of the Jubilee Medal "50 Years of the Armed Forces of the USSR"

The Jubilee Medal "50 Years of the Armed Forces of the USSR" was a 37mm in diameter circular gilded brass medal. On the obverse in the background, a laurel and oak wreath around the entire circumference of the medal with rays extending outwards from the center. In the center, a red enamelled five pointed star, its points extending to the edge of the medal, at its center, a 19mm in diameter circular relief medallion bearing the left profile busts of two Soviet soldiers, the nearer helmeted, the other wearing a Budenovka. Inscribed in relief along the medallion’s inner circumference, at left the year "1918", at right "1968". On the reverse in the top half, the relief outline of a five-pointed star with at its center, a hammer and a plough; below the star, the relief inscription in three rows: "FIFTY YEARS ARMED FORCES USSR" (Russian: «ПЯТЬДЕСЯТ ЛЕТ ВООРУЖЕННЫХ СИЛ СССР»).

The Jubilee Medal "50 Years of the Armed Forces of the USSR" was secured by a ring through the medal suspension loop to a standard Soviet pentagonal mount covered by a 24mm wide silk moiré turquoise ribbon with a central 2mm white stripe bordered by two 2mm red stripes themselves bordered by 1mm white stripes.

== Recipients (partial list) ==
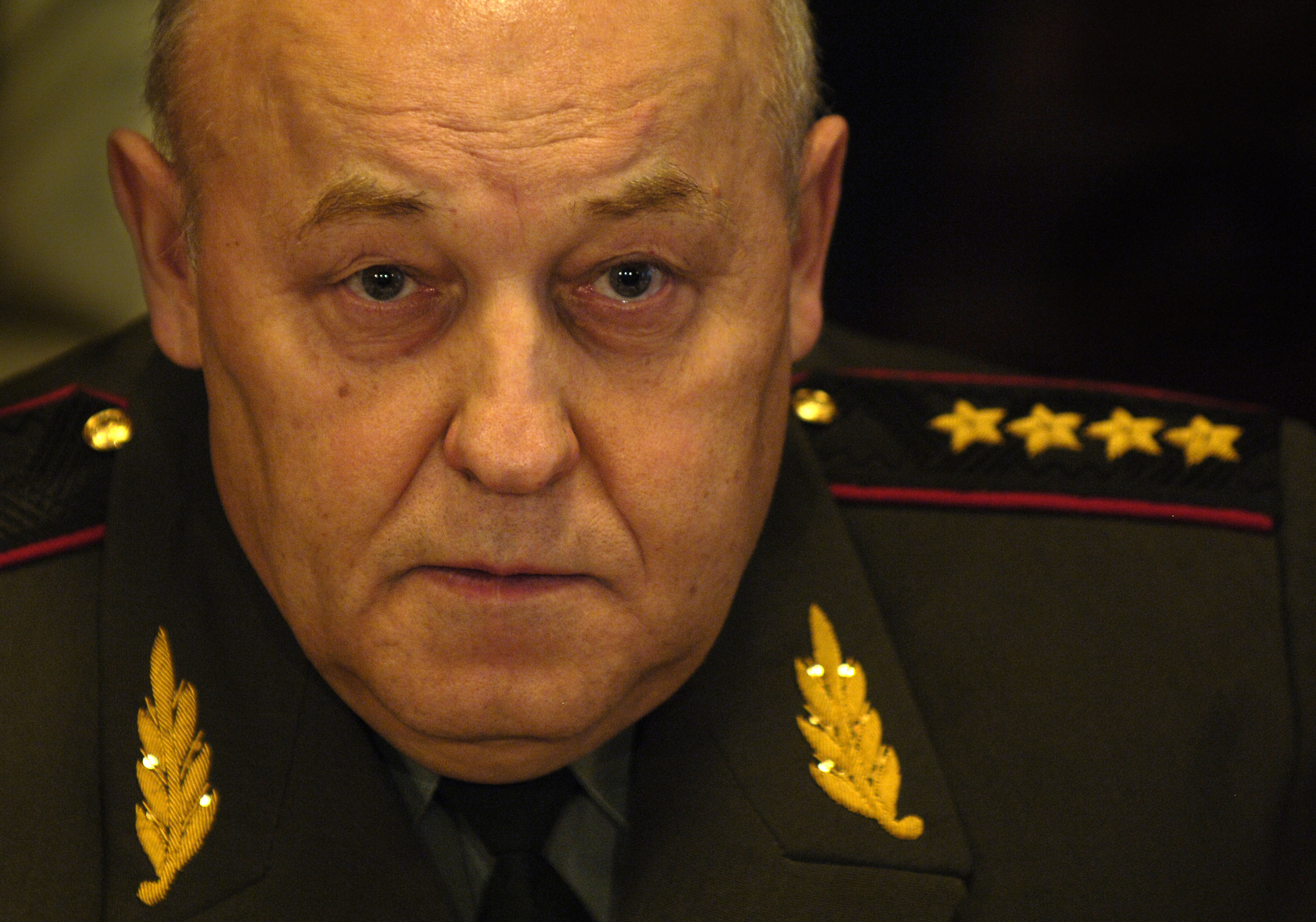
General Baluyevsky, a recipient of the Jubilee Medal "50 Years of the Armed Forces of the USSR"

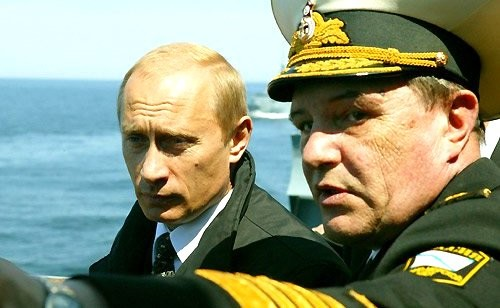
Admiral Kuroyedov, a recipient of the Jubilee Medal "50 Years of the Armed Forces of the USSR"

All individuals listed below are recipients of the Jubilee Medal "50 Years of the Armed Forces of the USSR".

- Colonel General Boris Vsevolodovich Gromov
- Army General Ivan Vladimirovich Tyulenev
- People's Artist of the USSR Nikolay Aleksandrovich Annenkov
- Army General Yury Nikolayevich Baluyevsky
- Admiral of the Fleet Vladimir Ivanovich Kuroyedov
- Army General Ivan Ivanovich Fedyuninsky
- Admiral of the Fleet Vladimir Afanasyevich Kasatonov
- Major Natalya Fyodorovna Meklin
- Army General Yakov Grigorevich Kreizer
- Rear Admiral Aksel Ivanovich Berg
- Lieutenant Colonel Vasily Maximovich Afonin
- Army General Kuzma Nikitovich Galitsky

== See also ==
- Red Army
- Awards and decorations of the Soviet Union
