= Vasily Afonin =

Soviet flying ace (1919–1996)

Vasily Maksimovich Afonin
- Native name: Василий Максимович Афонин
- Born: 10 February 1919; Mostovaya village, Tula Governorate, RSFSR
- Died: 4 January 1996 (aged 76) Moscow, Russian Federation
- Allegiance: Soviet Union
- Branch: Soviet Air Force
- Service years: 1938–1955
- Rank: Major
- Conflicts: World War II; Winter War; Eastern Front
- Awards: Hero of the Russian Federation

Vasily Maksimovich Afonin (Russian: Васи́лий Макси́мович Афо́нин; 10 February 1919 – 4 January 1996) was a Soviet flying ace who fought in the German-Soviet War. He also participated in the Winter War of 1939–1940. During the German-Soviet War he fought with the 72nd Guards Fighter Aviation Regiment, flying at various times the LaGG-3, Yak-1, Yak-7, Yak-9 and Yak-3.

Retiring at the rank of major, Afonin was officially credited with 14 personal and 3 shared victories over the course of 487 sorties.

== Awards and honors ==
- Hero of the Russian Federation (2 May 1996)
- Three Order of the Red Banner, three times (16 January 1943, 21 July 1943, 12 July 1944)
- Order of the Patriotic War (1st Class - 27 August 1943; 2nd Class - 15 January 1945 and 3 November 1985)
- Medal "For Battle Merit"
- campaign and jubilee medals

== See also ==
- List of Heroes of the Russian Federation
